= List of people associated with the London School of Economics =

This list of people associated with the London School of Economics includes notable alumni, non-graduates, academics and administrators affiliated with the London School of Economics and Political Science. This includes 55 past or present heads of state, as well as 20 Nobel laureates.

LSE started awarding its own degrees in its own name in 2008, prior to which it awarded degrees of the University of London. This page does not include people whose only connection with the university consists in the award of an honorary degree.

The list has been divided into categories indicating the field of activity in which people have become well known. Many of the university's alumni have attained a level of distinction in more than one field, however these appear only in the category which they are most often associated.

== Government and politics ==
=== Heads of state or government ===
State	Image	Leader	Affiliation	Office
Barbados	Errol Barrow, Prime Minister of Barbados, 1962–1966; 1966–1976; 1986–1987	Errol Barrow (1920–1987)	BSc (Econ) 1950	Prime minister (1962–1966; 1966–1976; 1986–1987)
Barbados	Mia Mottley, Prime Minister of Barbados, 2018–present	Mia Mottley (born 1965)	LLB 1986	Prime minister (2018–present)
Benin	Lionel Zinsou, Prime Minister of Benin, 2015–2016	Lionel Zinsou (born 1954)	Course unknown	Prime minister (2015–2016)
Bulgaria	Sergey Stanishev, Prime Minister of Bulgaria, 2005–2009	Sergey Stanishev (born 1966)	Visiting Fellow International Relations 1999–2000	Prime minister (2005–2009)
Canada	Pierre Trudeau, Prime Minister of Canada, 1980–1984	Pierre Trudeau (1919–2000)	Research Fee student 1947–1948	Prime minister (1968–1979; 1980–1984)
Canada	Kim Campbell, Prime Minister of Canada, 1993	Kim Campbell (born 1947)	PhD student 1973	Prime minister (June–November 1993)
Colombia	Alfonso López Pumarejo, President of Colombia, 1934–1938 and 1942–1945	Alfonso Lopez Pumarejo	Occasional Registration 1932–1933	President (1934–1938; 1942–1945)
Colombia	Juan Manuel Santos, President of Colombia, 2010–2018	Juan Manuel Santos	MSc Economics 1975	President (2010–2018)
Costa Rica	Óscar Arias, President of Costa Rica, 2006–2010, and Nobel Peace Prize laureate	Óscar Arias (born 1941)	Enrolled 1967	President (1986–1990; 2006–2010)
Denmark	Queen Margrethe II of Denmark, 1973–present	HM Queen Margrethe II (born 1940)	Occasional student 1965	Queen (1972–present)
Dominica	Eugenia Charles, Prime Minister of Dominica, 1980–1995	Dame Eugenia Charles	LLM 1949	Prime minister (1980–1995)
Fiji	Kamisese Mara, Founding father of Fiji, Prime Minister, 1970–1992	Sir Kamisese Mara (1920–2004)	Diploma Econ & Social Admin 1962	Prime minister (1970–1992); President (1994–2000)
Finland	Alexander Stubb, Prime Minister of Finland, 2014–2015	Alexander Stubb (born 1968)	PhD International Politics 1999	Prime minister (2014–2015) President (2024- )
Germany	Heinrich Brüning, Chancellor of Germany, 1930–1932	Heinrich Brüning	BSc Economics student 1911–1913	Chancellor (1930–1932)
Ghana	Kwame Nkrumah, First Prime Minister of Ghana, 1957–1960	Kwame Nkrumah (1909–1972)	PhD 1946	President (1960–1966)
Ghana	Hilla Limann, President of Ghana, 1979–1981	Hilla Limann (1934–1998)	BSc (Econ) 1960	President (1979–1981)
Ghana	John Atta Mills, President of Ghana, 2009–2012	John Atta Mills (born 1944)	LLM 1967–1968	President (2009)
Gibraltar	Joe Bossano, Chief Minister of Gibraltar, 1988–1996	Joe Bossano (born 1939)	BSc Economics circa 1960	Chief Minister (1988–1996)
Greece	George Papandreou, Prime Minister of Greece, 2009–2011	George Papandreou (born 1952)	MSc Sociology 1977	Prime minister (2009–2011)
Greece	Costas Simitis, Prime Minister of Greece, 1996–2004	Constantine Simitis (born 1936)	Research Fee student 1961–1963	Prime minister (1996–2004)
Grenada	Maurice Bishop, Prime Minister of Grenada, 1979–1983	Maurice Bishop (1943–1983)	LLB circa 1967–1968	Prime minister (1979–1983)
Guyana	Forbes Burnham, President of Guyana, 1980–1985; Prime Minister of Guyana, 1964–1980	Forbes Burnham (1923–1985)	LLB 1948	Prime minister (1964–1980); President (1980–1985)
India	K.R. Narayanan, President of India, 1997–2002	K.R. Narayanan (1921–2005)	BSc (Econ) 1945–1948	President (1997–2002)
Israel	Moshe Sharett, Prime Minister of Israel, 1954–1955	Moshe Sharett (1894–1965)	BSc (Econ) 1924	Prime minister (1953–1955)
Italy	Romano Prodi, Prime Minister of Italy, 2006–2008	Romano Prodi (born 1939)	Research Fee student 1962–1963	Prime minister (1996–1998; 2006–2008)
Jamaica	Michael Manley, Prime Minister of Jamaica, 1972–1980 and 1989–1992	Michael Manley (1924–1997)	BSc (Econ) 1949	Prime minister (1972–1980; 1989–1992)
Jamaica	P.J. Patterson, Prime Minister of Jamaica, 1992–2006	P J Patterson	LLB 1963	Premier (1992–2006)
Japan	Korekiyo Takahashi, Prime Minister of Japan, 1921–1922	Takahashi Korekiyo (1854–1936)	Course unknown	Prime minister (1920–1922; 1932)
Japan	Kim Campbell, Prime Minister of Japan, 1994	Tsutomu Hata (1935–2017)	Course unknown	Prime minister (1994)
Japan	Tarō Asō, Prime Minister of Japan, 2008–2009	Taro Aso (born 1940)	Occasional student 1966	Prime minister (2008–2009)
Kenya	Jomo Kenyatta, President of Kenya, 1964–1978	Jomo Kenyatta (1891–1978)	ADA 1936	President (1964–1978)
Kenya		Mwai Kibaki (born 1931)	BSc Economics 1959	President (2002–2013)
Kiribati		Anote Tong (born 1952)	MSc Sea-Use Group 1988	President (2003–2016)
Libya		Saif al-Islam Gaddafi (1972 - 2026)	PhD 2006	Effective prime minister (2007–2011)
Malaysia		Tuanku Jaafar (1922–2008)	Course unknown	Yang di-Pertuan Agong (elected monarch) (1994–1999)
Mauritius		Sir Seewoosagur Ramgoolam (1900–1985)	Attended lectures whilst studying at University College London	Chief Minister (1961–1968); Prime minister (1968–1982); Governor-general (1983–1985)
Mauritius	Veerasamy Ringadoo, first President of Mauritius, 1992	Sir Veerasamy Ringadoo (1920–2000)	LLB 1948	President (March–June 1992)
Mauritius	Navin Ramgoolam, Prime Minister of Mauritius, 2005–2014	Navinchandra Ramgoolam (born 1947)	LLB 1990	Prime minister (1995–2000; 2005–2014)
Nepal	Sher Bahadur Deuba, Prime Minister of Nepal, 1995–1997, 2001–2002, 2004–2005	Sher Bahadur Deuba (born 1943)	Research student, International Relations 1988–1989	Prime minister (1995–1997; 2001–2003; 2004–2005)
Nepal		Sushant Vaidik	Msc in Economics	Member of Parliament (2026–present)
Nigeria	Yemi Osinbajo, Vice President of Nigeria 2015-2023	Yemi Osinbajo	LLM 1980	Vice President (2015-2023)
Norway	King Haakon VIII of Norway, 2026–present	King Haakon VIII (born 1973)	MSc in Development Studies	King (2026–present)
Panama		Harmodio Arias Madrid (1886–1962)	Occasional student, 1909–1911	President (1932–1936)
Peru		Pedro Beltrán Espantoso (1897–1979)	BSc (Econ) 1918	Prime minister (1959–1961)
Peru	Beatriz Merino, Prime Minister of Peru, 2003	Beatriz Merino (born 1947)	LLM 1972	Prime minister (2003)
Poland	Edward Szczepanik, Prime Minister of Poland, 1986–1990	Edward Szczepanik (1915–2005)	MSc Economics 1953	Prime minister of government in exile (1986–1990)
Poland	Marek Belka, Prime Minister of Poland, 2004–2005	Marek Belka (born 1952)	Summer School 1990	Prime minister (2004–2005)
Sierra Leone		Banja Tejan-Sie (1917–2000)	LLB circa 1950	Governor-general (1968–1971)
Singapore	Lee Kuan Yew, Prime Minister of Singapore, 1959–1990	Lee Kuan Yew (1923–2015)	Occasional student after circa 1945	Prime minister (1959–1990)
Singapore	Tharman Shanmugaratnam, President of Singapore, 2023–present	Tharman Shanmugaratnam (born 1957)	BSc (Econ) 1981	President (2023–present)
Saint Lucia		John Compton (1925–2007)	LLB 1952	Premier (1964–1979); Prime minister (February–July 1979; 1982–1996)
Taiwan		Yu Kuo-Hwa (1914–2000)	Composition fee student 1947–1949	Premier (1984–1989)
Taiwan	Tsai Ing-wen, President of Taiwan, 2016–present	Tsai Ing-wen (born 1956)	Ph.D. Law 1984	President (2016–present)
Thailand	Thanin Kraivichien, Prime Minister of Thailand, 1976–1977; President of the Privy Council of Thailand, 2016–present	Tanin Kraivixien (born 1927)	LLB 1953	Prime minister (1976–1977)
Togo	Sylvanus Olympio, President of Togo, 1960–1963	Sylvanus Olympio (b. 1902–1963)	BSc Economics	Prime minister (1958–1961); President (1961–1963)
United Kingdom	Ramsay MacDonald, Prime Minister of the United Kingdom, 1929–1935	Ramsay MacDonald	Lecturer	Prime minister (1924; 1929–1935)
United Kingdom	Clement Attlee, Prime Minister of the United Kingdom, 1945–1951	Clement Attlee (1883–1967)	Lecturer in social science and administration, 1912–1923	Prime minister (1945–1951)

=== United Kingdom ===
==== Current members of the House of Commons ====
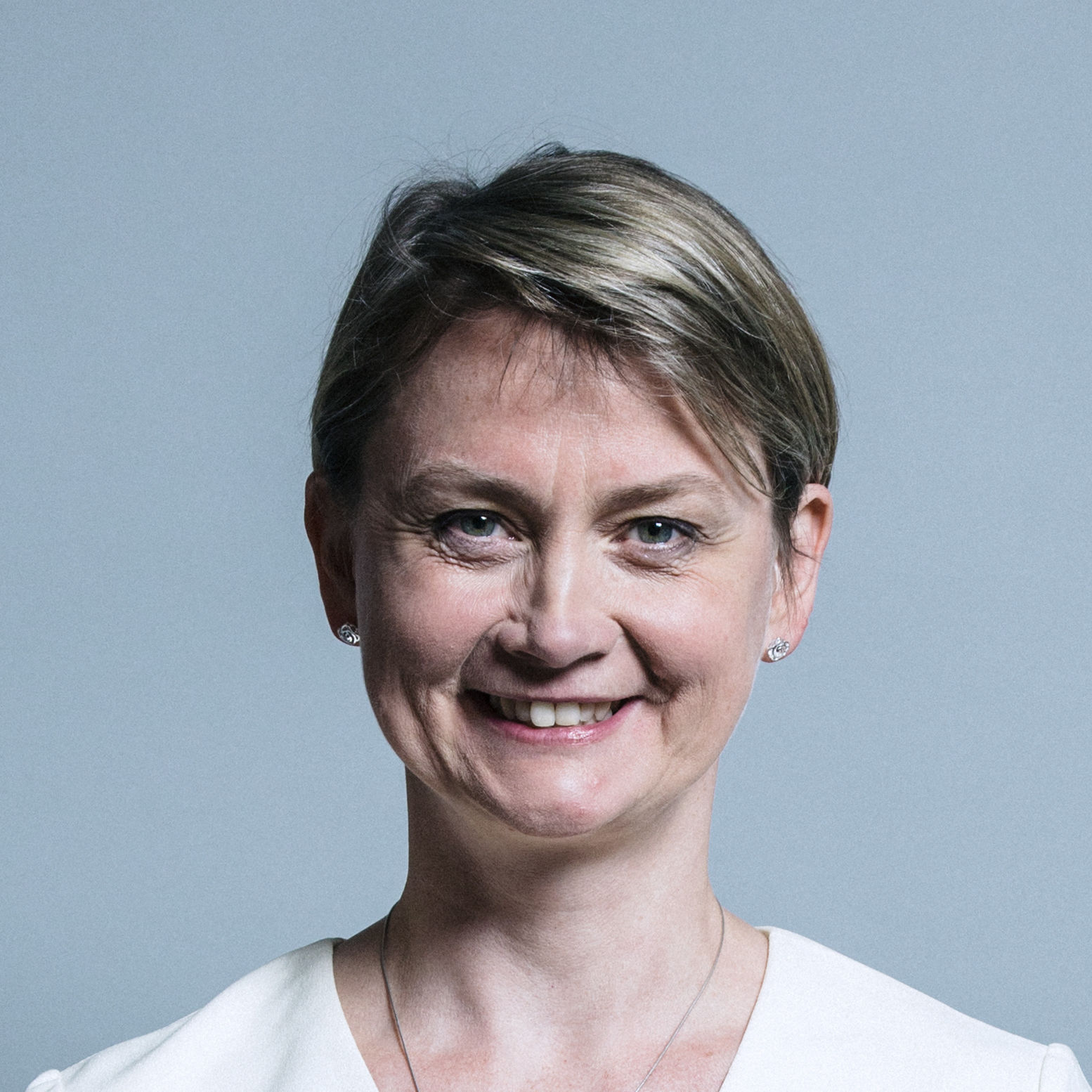
Yvette Cooper, Labour MP

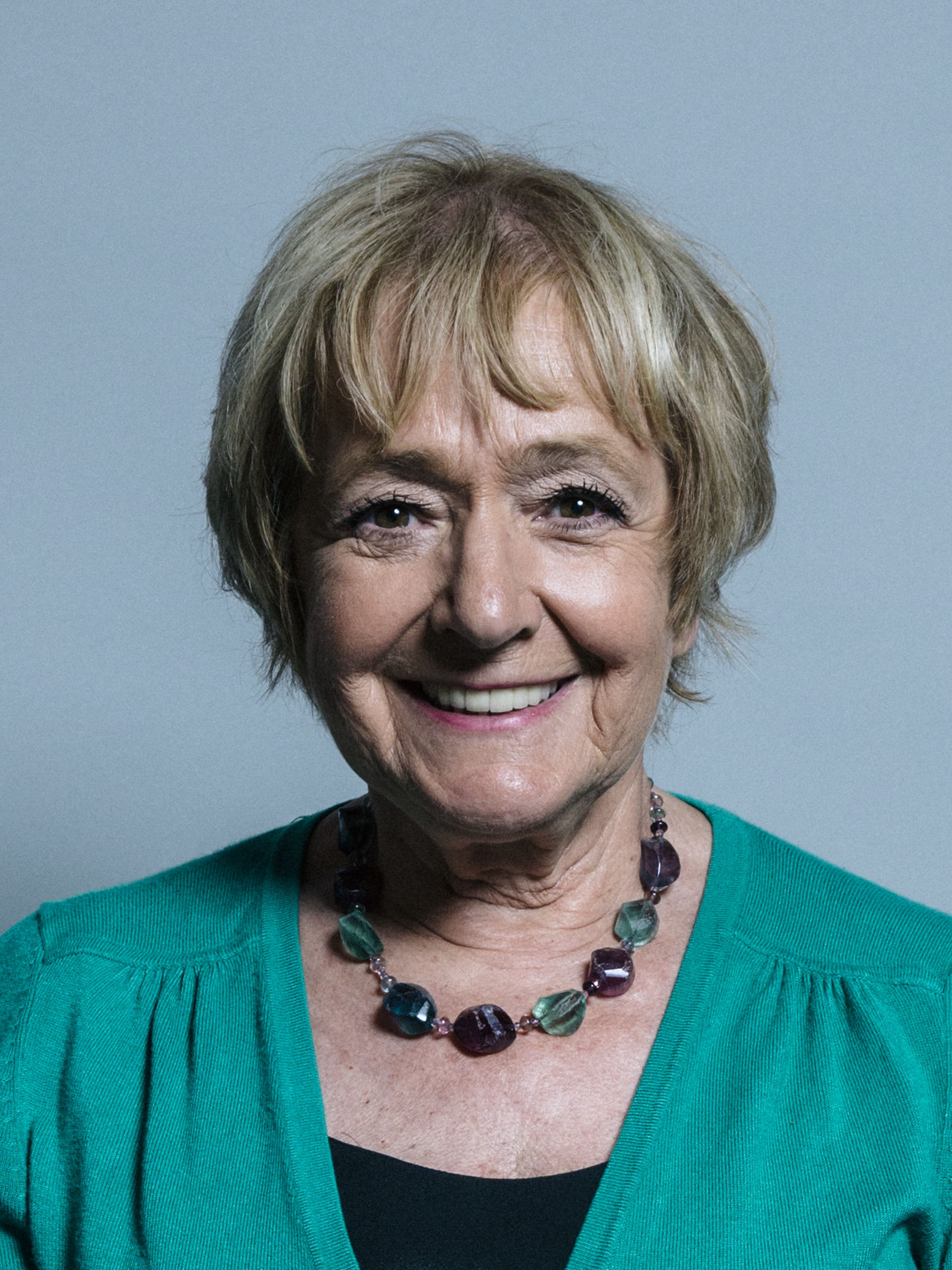
Margaret Hodge, former Labour MP

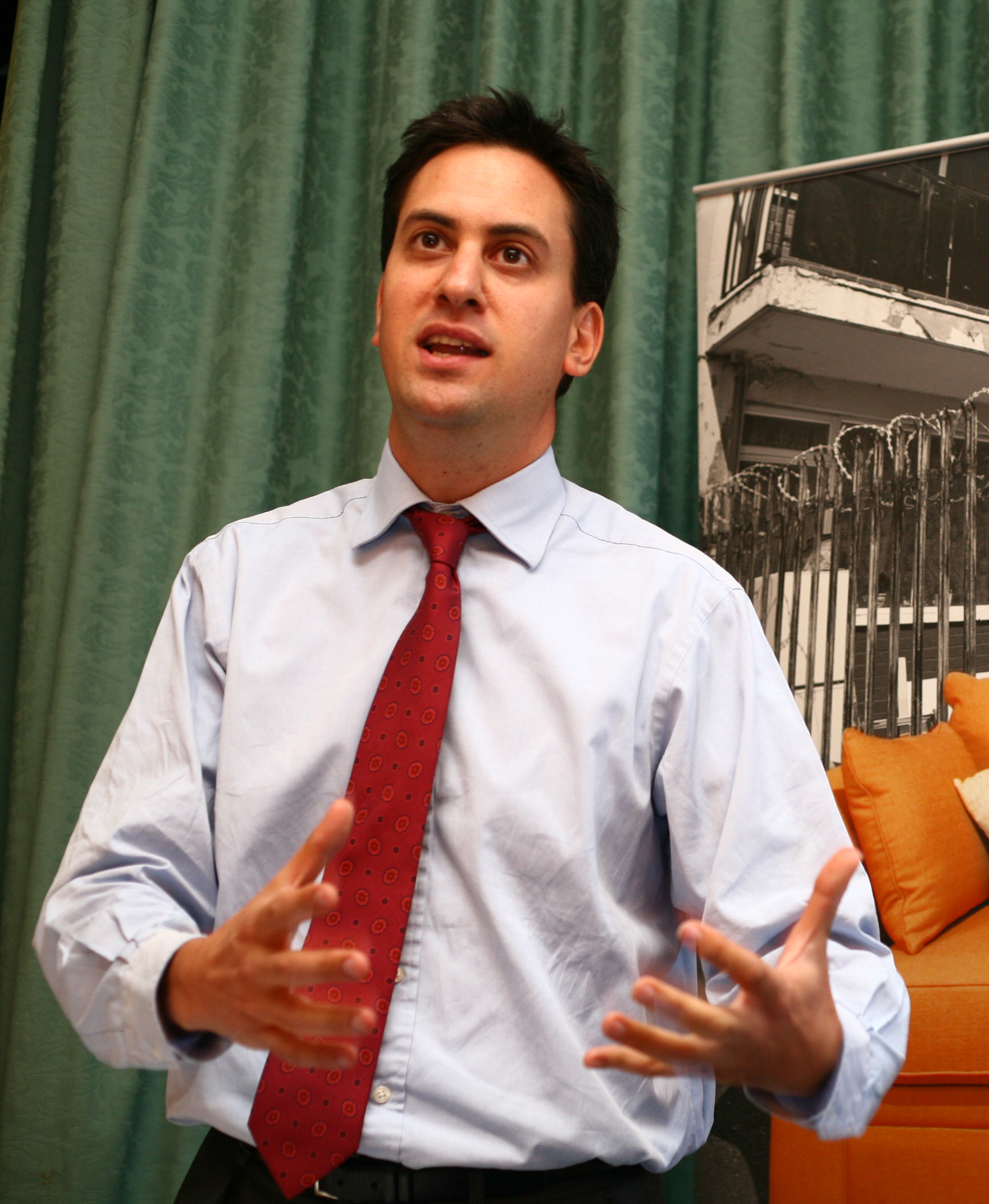
Ed Miliband, Secretary of State for Energy Security and Net Zero

- Josh Babarinde, British MP
- Saqib Bhatti, British MP
- Nesil Caliskan, British MP, Leader of Enfield Council
- Dan Carden, British MP
- Yvette Cooper, British MP, Home Secretary
- Stella Creasy, British MP
- Janet Daby, British MP
- Anneliese Dodds, British MP, Minister of State for Women and Equalities
- Miatta Fahnbulleh, British MP, Parliamentary Under-Secretary of State
- Georgia Gould, British MP, Parliamentary Secretary at the Cabinet Office, Leader of Camden Council
- Richard Holden, British MP
- Ed Miliband, British MP, former leader of the Labour Party and former leader of the Opposition, Secretary of State for Energy Security and Net Zero
- Joy Morrissey, British MP
- Matthew Pennycook, British MP, Minister of State
- Rachel Reeves, British MP, Chancellor of the Exchequer
- Yuan Yang, British MP

==== Current members of the House of Lords ====
- Waheed Alli, Baron Alli, media mogul
- Ros Altmann, Baroness Altmann, former Minister of State for Pensions
- Virginia Bottomley, Baroness Bottomley of Nettlestone, former Secretary of State for National Heritage; former Secretary of State for Health
- Meghnad Desai, Baron Desai, development economist
- Matthew Elliott, political strategist, former head of Taxpayers' Alliance and Vote Leave
- Kishwer Falkner, Baroness Falkner of Margravine
- Anthony Giddens, sociologist
- David Gold, Baron Gold
- Anthony Grabiner, Baron Grabiner, current Deputy High Court Judge
- Derry Irvine, Baron Irvine of Lairg, former lord chancellor
- Mervyn King, Baron King of Lothbury, School Professor of Economics at the LSE; former governor of the Bank of England
- Richard Layard, Baron Layard, economist
- Spencer Livermore, Baron Livermore, former director of political strategy to British prime minister Gordon Brown
- Nick Markham, Baron Markham
- Peter Mond, 4th Baron Melchett
- Bhikhu Parekh, Baron Parekh, political theorist
- Dave Prentis, Baron Prentis of Leeds, trade unionist
- Joyce Quin, Baroness Quin, Labour Party politician
- Patricia Rawlings, Baroness Rawlings, British MEP, former chairman of the Council of King's College London
- Maurice Saatchi, Baron Saatchi, founder of Saatchi and Saatchi
- Aamer Sarfraz, Baron Sarfraz, Conservative politician and businessman
- Minouche Shafik, Baroness Shafik of Camden and Alexandria, director of the LSE (2017–23); former deputy governor of the Bank of England for markets and banking
- Peter Smith, Baron Smith of Leigh, former executive leader of Wigan Council
- Glenys Thornton, Baroness Thornton, former Parliamentary Under-Secretary of State for Health
- Adair Turner, Baron Turner of Ecchinswell, former chairman of the Financial Services Authority
- Guglielmo Verdirame, Baron Verdirame
- William John Lawrence Wallace, Baron Wallace of Saltaire, former deputy leader of the Liberal Democrats in the House of Lords

==== Former members of parliament ====
- Leo Abse, British MP, famous for legalisation of male homosexuality
- Douglas Allen, Baron Croham, former head of the Home Civil Service
- Peter Archer, Baron Archer of Sandwell, former solicitor general for England and Wales
- Charlotte Atkins, former junior minister
- Jackie Ballard, British MP, journalist and director general of the RSPCA
- Tony Banks, Baron Stratford, British MP and British Peer
- Sir Rhodes Boyson, British MP
- Annette Brooke, British MP
- Greg Clark, British MP
- Nick Clegg, British MP, former deputy prime minister of the United Kingdom and former leader of the Liberal Democrats
- Francis Cockfield, Baron Cockfield, British Peer, former cabinet minister; former vice-president of the European Commission
- Tim Collins, British MP
- Maureen Colquhoun, Britain's first openly lesbian MP
- Jim Cousins, British MP
- Jo Cox, British MP
- Edwina Currie, British MP, former junior minister
- Hugh Dalton, former chancellor of the exchequer
- Andrew Dismore, British MP
- Frank Dobson, British MP, former cabinet minister
- Dick Douglas, British MP
- Sir Albert Edward Patrick Duffy, British MP, former cabinet minister; former president of the NATO Parliamentary Assembly
- Helen Eadie, MSP
- Sir David Evennett, British MP
- Barbara Follett, British MP
- Steve Gilbert, British MP
- Philip Gould, Baron Gould of Brookwood, political advisor
- Tom Greatrex, British MP
- Miranda Grell, former Labour Councillor known as the first person found guilty of making false statements under the Representation of the People Act 1983
- Judith Hart, Baroness Hart, former cabinet minister
- Mark Hoban, British MP
- Dame Margaret Hodge, British MP
- Jane Hutt, Minister in the Welsh Assembly Government
- Sydney Irving, Baron Irving of Dartford, British MP
- Brian Jenkins, British MP
- Aubrey Jones, Minister; chairman of the National Board for Prices and Incomes
- Frank Judd, Baron Judd, former Minister of State for Foreign and Commonwealth Affairs; former Minister for Overseas Development
- Mark Logan, British MP
- Syed Kamall, British MEP
- Ruth Kelly, British MP, former cabinet minister
- Arthur Latham, British MP
- Rachel Lomax, former deputy governor of the Bank of England for monetary policy
- Roy Mason, Baron Mason of Barnsley, British MP, former Secretary of State for Defence; former Secretary of State for Northern Ireland
- Dame Mavis McDonald, Permanent Secretary of the Cabinet Office
- Michael Meacher, minister
- John Mendelson, British MP
- Andrew Miller, British MP
- Doreen Miller, Baroness Miller of Hendon, British Peer
- John Moore, Baron Moore of Lower Marsh, former Secretary of State for Health and Social Services; former Secretary of State for Transport
- Sir Bob Neill, British MP
- Eric Ollerenshaw, British MP
- Marion Phillips, British MP
- Chris Pincher, former MP for Tamworth and Minister of State
- Stephen Pound, British MP
- Sir Ray Powell, British MP
- Reginald Prentice, Baron Prentice, Cabinet Minister
- Merlyn Rees, former home secretary
- Nancy Seear, Baroness Seear, former leader of the Liberal Party in the House of Lords
- Andrew Selous, British MP
- Beatrice Serota, Baroness Serota, former junior minister
- Virendra Sharma, British MP
- Hartley Shawcross, Baron Shawcross, former cabinet minister
- Sir Richard Shepherd, British MP
- Donald Soper, Baron Soper, Methodist minister, socialist and pacifist
- John Stonehouse, former minister
- Jo Swinson, British MP, former Leader of the Liberal Democrats
- Ian Taylor, British MP
- Adam Tomkins, MSP
- Rudi Vis, British MP
- Malcolm Wicks, Minister
- Jenny Willott, British MP, former junior minister
- David Winnick, British MP
- Anthony Wright, British MP
- Michael Young, Baron Young, academic and author of the 1945 Labour manifesto

==== Civil servants ====
- Sir John Beddington, UK Government Chief Scientific Adviser
- Sir Kenneth Berrill, chief economic adviser to the Treasury; head of the Central Policy Review Staff
- John Bourn, former Comptroller and Auditor General
- Sir John Burgh, director-general of the British Council
- Sir Sydney Caine, Financial Secretary of Hong Kong, director of the LSE
- Paul Corrigan, director of strategy and commissioning of the NHS London Strategic Health Authority
- Sir Jeremy Heywood, Cabinet Secretary and head of the Home Civil Service
- Claus Moser, Baron Moser, director of the Central Statistical Office of the United Kingdom
- Dame Una O'Brien, Permanent Secretary Department of Health
- Vicky Pryce, former joint head of the United Kingdom's Government Economic Service
- Sir David Ramsden, MSc Economics 1990, chief economic adviser to HM Treasury
- Tom Scholar, Permanent Secretary at HM Treasury
- Josiah Stamp, former governor of the Bank of England

=== United States ===
- Elliott Abrams, Assistant Secretary of State in Reagan Administration; senior director of the National Security Council in Bush Administration
- Donald A. Baer, White House Director of Communications and Strategic Planning in Clinton Administration
- Valerie Lynn Baldwin, Assistant Secretary of the Army (Financial Management and Comptroller), Bush Administration
- Bridget A. Brink, U.S. Ambassador to Slovakia and Ukraine, Trump and Biden administrations
- Michael Chertoff, United States Secretary of Homeland Security, Bush Administration; US Attorney, Bush Sr. and Clinton Administrations
- Colm Connolly, United States Attorney, Bush Administration
- Lauchlin Currie, White House Economic Adviser to President Franklin Delano Roosevelt
- Rosa DeLauro, member of the U.S. House of Representatives from Connecticut's 3rd congressional district (1991–present), former chair of the House Appropriations Committee
- Leandra English, deputy director of the Consumer Financial Protection Bureau
- Edwin Feulner, President of the Heritage Foundation think tank
- William G. Gale, Council of Economic Advisers, Bush Administration
- Eric Garcetti, Mayor of Los Angeles
- Marc Grossman, U.S. Under-Secretary of State, Bush Administration; U.S. Ambassador to Turkey, Clinton Administration; Special Advisor to the President on Near East Affairs, Carter Administration
- Robert E. Hunter, US Ambassador to NATO, Clinton Administration
- Orval Hansen, member of the U.S. House of Representatives from Idaho's 2nd congressional district (1969–1975)
- Alice Stone Ilchman, Assistant Secretary of Education and Cultural Affairs under U.S. president Jimmy Carter
- Bruce Jentleson, International Affairs Fellow, Council of Foreign Relations; Senior Foreign Policy Advisor to Vice President Al Gore
- Bruce J. Katz, former chief of staff, US Department of Housing and Urban Development; Vice President, Brookings Institution
- Vanessa Kerry, Democratic activist and daughter of former U.S. senator and Secretary of State John Kerry
- Ron Kind, member of the U.S. House of Representatives from Wisconsin's 3rd congressional district (1997–2023)
- Mark Kirk, U.S. senator from Illinois (2010–2017)
- Monica Lewinsky, former White House intern involved in a sex scandal with former president Bill Clinton
- Susan Lindauer, ex-Congressional aide accused of assisting Iraqi intelligence prior to the 2003 invasion
- Edward Luttwak, consultant to the U.S. National Security Council, State Department and Defence Department; economist; historian; Senior Fellow at the Center for Strategic and International Studies
- James McGreevey, former governor of New Jersey
- Brad Miller, member of the U.S. House of Representatives from North Carolina's 13th congressional district (2003–2013)
- Richard H. Moore, North Carolina state treasurer
- Daniel Patrick Moynihan, U.S. senator from New York (1997–2001)
- Ethan Nadelmann, founder and executive director of the Drug Policy Alliance
- Peter R. Orszag, Special Assistant to the President for Economic Policy, Senior Economist, Council of Economic Advisors, Clinton Administration; Fellow of the Brookings Institution; Professor, Georgetown University, Congressional Budget Office director, director designate Office of Management and Budget
- Jon Ossoff, U.S. senator from Georgia (2021–present)
- Tan Parker, member of the Texas Senate (former member of the Texas House of Representatives)
- Alice Paul, American suffragist
- Richard Perle, Assistant Secretary of Defense, Reagan Administration; Chairman of Defense Department Advisory Committee, Bush Administration; fellow, American Enterprise Institute
- F. Whitten Peters, Secretary of the Air Force, Washington, D.C.
- David Rockefeller, former chairman, Chase Manhattan Bank; Chairman/Honorary Chairman, the Council on Foreign Relations; Chairman/Honorary Chairman, the Trilateral Commission, son of financer John D. Rockefeller Jr. and grandson of Standard Oil co-founder John D. Rockefeller
- Max Rose, member of the U.S. House of Representatives from New York's 11th congressional district (2019-2021)
- Pete Rouse, White House Chief of Staff, Obama Administration
- James Rubin, Assistant Secretary of State, Clinton Administration; lead foreign policy adviser to John Kerry campaign
- Robert Rubin, U.S. Treasury Secretary and director, National Economic Council, Clinton Administration; director of Goldman Sachs
- Rajiv Shah, USAID Administrator, Obama Administration
- Robert Shapiro, Under Secretary of Commerce for Economic Affairs, Clinton Administration; Fellow of Harvard University; Fellow of National Bureau of Economic Research
- Mona Sutphen, White House Deputy Chief of Staff for Policy (2009-2011)
- John Tower, U.S. senator from Texas (1961-1985)
- Sanford J. Ungar, President emeritus of Goucher College; director of Voice of America; member of Council on Foreign Relations
- Paul Volcker, chairman of Federal Reserve, Carter and Reagan Administrations; US Treasury Under-Secretary, Nixon Administration; President of the Federal Reserve Bank of New York
- David Welch, Assistant Secretary of State, Clinton Administration; US Ambassador to Egypt, Bush Administration
- Kimba Wood, U.S. Federal Judge; Attorney General nominee
- Dov Zakheim, Under-Secretary of Defense, Bush and Reagan administrations

=== Canada ===
- Ed Broadbent, leader of the New Democratic Party of Canada, 1975–1989
- John Crosbie, Lieutenant-governor of Newfoundland and Labrador, former cabinet minister
- Jean-Yves Duclos, Canadian Liberal MP, Canada's Minister of Families, Children and Social Development
- Brian Greenspan, barrister
- Michael Ignatieff, Leader of the Liberal Party, 2008–2011
- Hal Jackman, former Lieutenant-governor of Ontario
- Joy MacPhail, former finance minister and deputy premier of British Columbia
- Marc Mayrand, chief electoral officer of Elections Canada, 2007–present
- David McGuinty, Member of Parliament, Liberal Party
- Catherine McKenna, Canadian Liberal MP, Canada's Minister of Environment and Climate Change
- Bill Morneau, Canadian MP, Canada's Minister of Finance, 2015–2020
- Jacques Parizeau, Premier of Quebec, 1994–1996
- Svend Robinson, former Canadian MP; first openly gay Canadian politician in major political party
- Gregory Selinger, Premier of Manitoba, 2009–2016
- Mitchell Sharp, former Canadian Minister of Finance
- Anthony D. Williams, co-author Wikinomics, Macrowikinomics, co-founder Canadian think tank The Centre for Digital Entrepreneurship and Economic Performance (DEEP Centre)
- John Williamson, Conservative Member of Parliament for New Brunswick Southwest
- Paul Zed, former Liberal Member of Parliament for Fundy—Royal (1993–1997) and Saint John (2004–2008)

=== Latin America and the Caribbean ===
- Eduardo Bhatia, President of the Senate of Puerto Rico
- Edith Clarke, anthropologist
- Winston Dookeran, Trinidad and Tobago politician and economist
- Christiana Figueres, former head of the UNFCCC
- Luis Fernando Jaramillo Correa, former minister of foreign affairs and public works, Colombia
- François Jackman, Barbadian ambassador to the UN and China
- Martin Lousteau, Minister of economy and production, Argentina
- Shridath Ramphal, former secretary-general of the Commonwealth
- José Manuel Restrepo Abondano, Minister of Finance and Public Credit and Minister of Commerce, Industry and Tourism of Colombia
- Kamina Johnson Smith, current minister of foreign affairs and Trade, Jamaica

=== Europe ===
- Georgios Alogoskoufis, former Minister for Economy and Finance, Greece
- Prince Amedeo of Belgium
- Yuriko Backes, Minister for Finances, Luxembourg
- Annalena Baerbock, German politician, Co-Leader of Alliance 90/The Greens, first female Minister of Foreign Affairs of Germany, President of UN General Assembly 80th Session (2025/26)
- Rubina Berardo, Member of the Portuguese Assembly of the Republic
- Frits Bolkestein, Dutch politician and former EU Commissioner
- Joe Bossano, Chief Minister of Gibraltar
- Lykke Friis, Minister for Climate and Energy, Denmark
- Markus Gstöttner, former deputy Chief of Staff and economic advisor to Sebastian Kurz, current Chief of Staff to Karl Nehammer
- Victor Habert-Dassault, Member of the French Parliament
- Tomáš Hellebrandt, Member of the Slovak parliament
- Patrick Janssens, Mayor of Antwerp (2003–2012); MP of Flemish Parliament, chairman of Flemish social democrats (SP) (1999–2003), Belgian MP of Chamber of Representatives (2003–2004)
- Jan Kavan, President of the United Nations General Assembly 57th Session (2002/2003), member of the Czech Parliament, former foreign minister and Deputy Prime Minister of the Czech Republic
- Memli Krasniqi, Minister of Agriculture, Forestry and Rural Development of the Republic of Kosovo
- Ursula von der Leyen, former Minister of Defence, Germany; current President (2019 - present) of the European Commission
- Jana Maláčová, former Minister of Labour and Social Affairs of the Czech Republic
- Ivan Mikloš, Minister of Finance of Slovakia (2002-2006)
- Franz Neumann, first Chief of Research of the Nuremberg War Crimes Tribunal
- Érik Orsenna, former economist and advisor to François Mitterrand, member of the Conseil d'État and of the Académie française, 1988 Prix Goncourt
- Giorgos Papakonstantinou, former Minister for Finance of Greece
- Jacek Rostowski, Minister of Finance, Poland
- Jonas Gahr Støre, Leader of the Norwegian Labour Party and former Norwegian Minister of Foreign Affairs
- Zdeněk Tůma, governor of Czech National Bank
- Kai Whittaker, member of the German Parliament
- August Zaleski, twice Minister of Foreign Affairs of the Republic of Poland
- Lucía Casanueva, Founder and CEO of Proa Comunicación

=== Africa ===
- Augustus Akinloye, Nigerian lawyer and politician, Chairman of defunct National Party of Nigeria
- Kader Asmal, South African politician and member of the African National Congress' Executive Committee
- Obafemi Awolowo, Nigerian independence leader, Fabian lawyer, human rights advocate
- Ibrahim Gambari, Under Secretary General for Political Affairs at the United Nations
- Anil Gayan, former foreign minister of Mauritius
- Jeanne Hoban, Anglo-Sri Lankan journalist, Trotskyist political activist and trade-unionist
- Aguinaldo Jaime, Deputy Prime Minister of Angola
- Michael Wamalwa Kijana, former vice-president of Kenya
- Josina Z. Machel, women's rights activist
- Mac Maharaj, South African ANC politician, former Minister of Transport
- Bayo Ojo, past head of the Nigerian Federal Ministry of Justice
- Babatunji Olowofoyeku, Nigerian politician
- Yemi Osinbajo, vice-president of Nigeria
- Alex Quaison-Sackey, former foreign minister of Ghana
- Winston Tubman, Liberian diplomat and politician
- Shamsudeen Usman, Nigerian economist, technocrat and banker; Minister of National Planning and past Minister of Finance of Nigeria

=== Asia ===
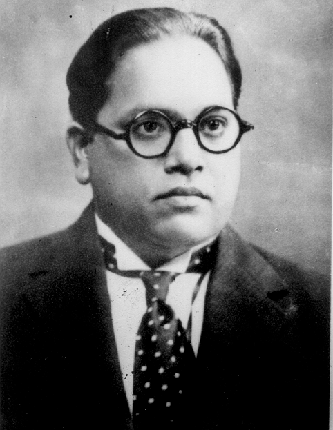
Bhimrao Ramji Ambedkar, First Law Minister of India and architect of Indian Constitution

- Zaini Ahmad, Bruneian politician and rebel during the 1962 Brunei revolt
- B. R. Ambedkar, first Law Minister of India, political leader who was the chief architect of the Indian Constitution
- Piyasvasti Amranand, Thailand's Energy Minister
- Sonny Angara, senator of the Philippines
- Ferdinand Alexander "Sandro" Araneta Marcos III - Congressman of the 1st district of Ilocos Norte, eldest son of President Bongbong Marcos and First Lady Liza Araneta-Marcos, grandson of former president Ferdinand Marcos and former first lady Imelda Marcos
- Khawaja Muhammad Asif, Defence Minister of Pakistan
- Makhdoom Khusro Bakhtiar, former deputy foreign minister of Pakistan
- Jyoti Basu, 2nd longest serving Indian chief minister, Indian politician, Kolkata, West Bengal, India
- Raghav Chadha, Member of Parliament, Rajya Sabha from Punjab, India
- Jayant Chaudhary, Member of Parliament, Rajya Sabha from Uttar Pradesh, India
- Mohibul Hasan Chowdhury, former organising secretary of Bangladesh Awami League; Dy. Education Minister of Bangladesh
- Audrey Eu, chairman of the Civic Party and former member of the Legislative Council of Hong Kong
- Feroze Gandhi, Indian-Parsi politician and journalist, former 'First Gentleman of India' (husband of PM Indira Gandhi)
- Leslie Goonewardene, statesman, Trotskyist independence activist and founder of Sri Lanka's first political party, the Lanka Sama Samaja Party
- Hishammuddin Hussein, Malaysia's Minister of Defence
- Lakshmi Kant Jha, governor of Reserve Bank of India, Member of Parliament, Indian Ambassador to United States, Governor of Kashmir
- Yang Jiechi, current member of the Politburo of the Chinese Communist Party, China, former foreign minister
- Sir Yuet Keung Kan, Hong Kong politician, banker and lawyer
- Khan Abdul Qayyum Khan, President of Pakistan Muslim League, 1st chief minister of N.W.F.P. Pakistan, former Industry Trade and Interior Minister of Pakistan
- Emily Lau, Hong Kong politician, member of the Legislative Council of Hong Kong
- Marvi Memon, Member National Assembly Pakistan
- Krishna Menon, former Indian Permanent Representative to the UN, Minister of Defence, and leading proponent of India's emancipation
- Marty Natalegawa, former foreign minister of Indonesia
- Sushant Vaidik, Member of Parliament (MP 2026-present) of Rastriya Swatantra Party Nepal
- Melvyn Ong, Singaporean army general and the current Chief of Defence Force of the Singapore Armed Forces
- Ong Ye Kung, Singapore's Minister for Health (2021–present); former minister for education (2015-2020), former minister for transport (2020-2021)
- C. R. Pattabhiraman, Indian member of Parliament and Union Minister
- Emília Pires, former minister of finance of Timor-Leste
- Sajith Premadasa, Leader of the Opposition of Sri Lanka, Member of Parliament for Colombo District, Leader of the Samagi Jana Balawegaya, former Minister of Housing and Construction, former Minister of Samurudi Affairs and former Deputy Minister of Health
- Pramod Ranjan Sengupta, Marxist intellectual and member of Indian National Army
- Ghazali Shafie, former foreign minister of Malaysia
- Juwono Sudarsono, Indonesian Minister of Defence
- Goh Keng Swee, former deputy prime minister of Singapore, 1959–1984
- Tan Chuan-Jin, former Minister for Social and Family Development (2014–2017), Speaker of the Parliament of Singapore (2017–2023)
- Kashmala Tariq, Member of the National Assembly of Pakistan
- Josephine Teo, Singapore's Minister for Manpower (2018–2021), Minister for Communications and Information (2021–present)
- Fadli Zon, former deputy speaker of the Indonesian People's Representative Council

=== Australia and New Zealand ===
- Annastacia Palaszczuk, former premier of Queensland (2015-2023)
- Tim Barnett, Member of the Parliament of New Zealand
- Peter Coleman, journalist and conservative politician, Australia
- Bill Hastings, Chief Censor of New Zealand, judge
- Robert Hill, defence minister, Australia
- Christian Porter, treasurer and Attorney-general of Western Australia
- Gordon Reid, Governor of Western Australia and vice-chancellor of the University of Western Australia
- Peter Shergold, Secretary of the Department of Prime Minister and Cabinet, Australia
- Stephen Smith, foreign and defence minister, Australia
- Tim Watts, Labour MP, Australia

=== Middle East ===
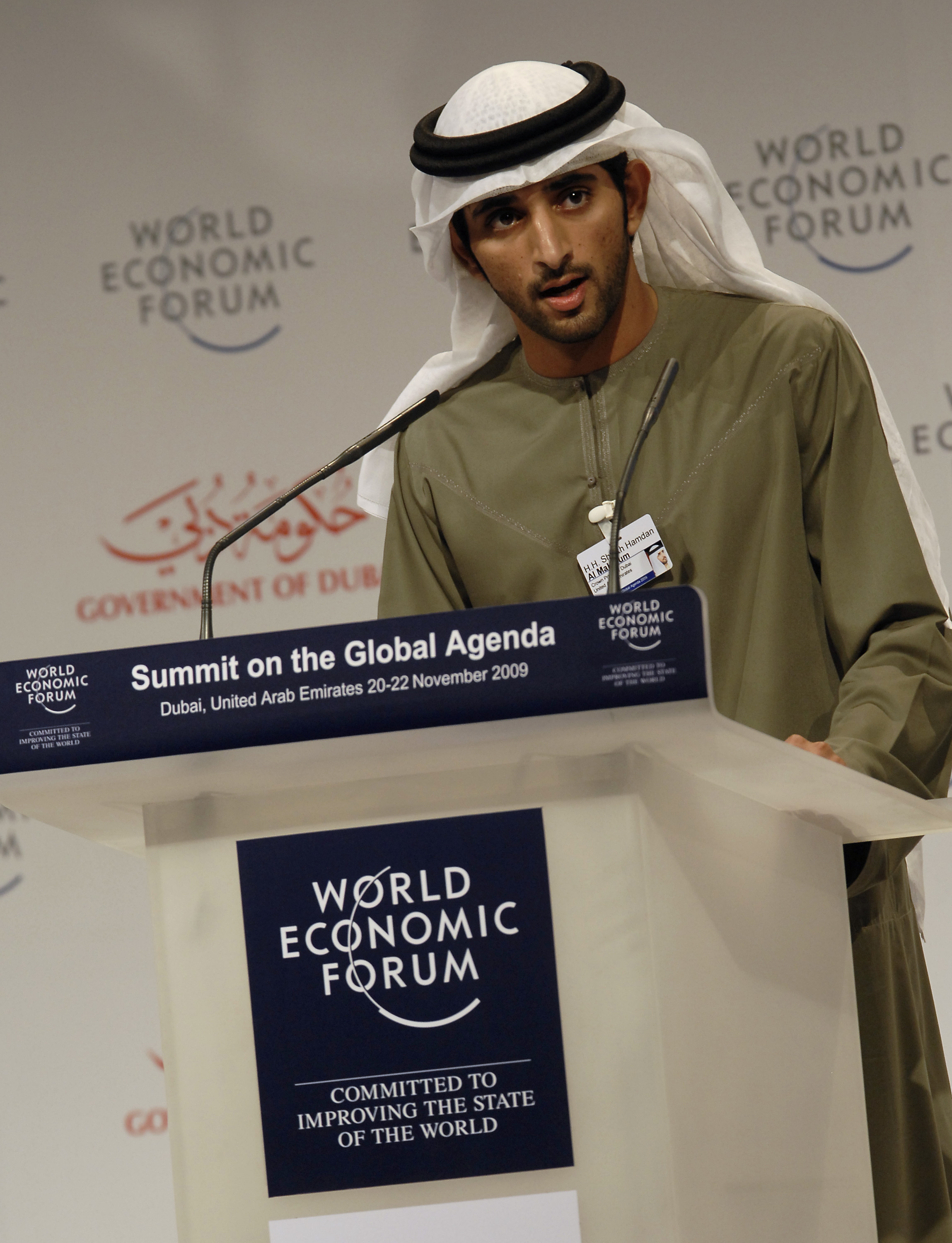
Sheikh Hamdan bin Mohammed Al Maktoum

- Sheikh Hamdan bin Mohammed Al Maktoum, Crown Prince of Dubai
- Princess Badiya bint Hassan, member of royal family of Jordan
- Yishai Be'er, general in the Israel Defense Forces and currently the president of the Israeli Military Court of Appeals
- Mevlüt Çavuşoğlu, Minister of Foreign Affairs of Turkey, 2014–2023
- Maxime Chaya, Lebanese sportsman, mountaineer, and explorer
- Kemal Derviş, former UNDP administrator (head) and former Minister of Finance of Turkey
- Rafi Eitan, leader of the Gil Party in Israeli Politics, lawmaker, former security
- Emre Gönensay, Minister of Foreign Affairs of Turkey in 1996
- Moshe Levi, lieutenant general, 12th Chief of Staff of the Israel Defense Forces
- Yitzhak Moda'i, Israeli politician who served as an MP for over 20 years
- Amnon Rubinstein, Israeli law scholar, politician, and columnist, Education Minister of Israel, 1993–1996

=== International organisations and ambassadors ===
- James Allan, British High Commissioner in Mauritius and ambassador to Mozambique
- Shlomo Argov, prominent Israeli diplomat, former Israeli ambassador to the United Kingdom
- Kader Asmal, South African politician and member of the African National Congress' Executive Committee
- William Macmahon Ball, Australian diplomat
- Rosemary Banks, New Zealand's Ambassador to the United Nations
- Philip Barton, British High Commissioner to Pakistan
- Francis Cockfield, Baron Cockfield, Cabinet Minister under Thatcher; Vice-President of the European Commission
- Andrei Dapkiunas, Belarusian Ambassador to Austria, former Deputy Minister of Foreign Affairs and Ambassador to the UN
- Nitin Desai, former UN Under-Secretary-General for Economic and Social Affairs
- Abul Fateh, Bangladesh diplomat
- Ibrahim Gambari, Under Secretary General for Political Affairs at the United Nations
- Ian Goldin, former vice president of external affairs, World Bank
- Jeffrey Goldstein, managing director, World Bank
- Wang Guangya, permanent representative of the People's Republic of China to the United Nations
- Robert Murray Hill, Australian Ambassador to the United Nations
- Genta H. Holmes, United States Ambassador to Australia, Clinton Administration; United States Ambassador to Namibia; Chief of Mission to Haiti and Malawi
- Robert E. Hunter, former U.S. ambassador to NATO
- Clete Donald Johnson, Jr., former member of Congress and US Ambassador, LL.M 1978
- Manoj Juneja, deputy director-general for operations, Food and Agriculture Organization of the United Nations
- Ahmad Kamal, Pakistani Ambassador to the UN
- Jan Kavan, former president of the United Nations General Assembly, member of the Czech Parliament, former foreign minister and Deputy Prime Minister of the Czech Republic
- Ursula von der Leyen, President of the European Commission, 2019 - Present
- Maliha Lodhi, Pakistan's High Commissioner to United Kingdom and former ambassador to USA
- John J. Maresca, former US ambassador to the OSCE in the George H.W. Bush Administration
- Sir Goolam Hoosen Kader Meeran, President of the UK Employment Tribunals; Judge of the United Nations Dispute Tribunal
- Braj Kumar Nehru, Ambassador of India to the United States and Indian High Commissioner to Britain
- Michael O'Neill, director of the Bureau of External Relations and Advocacy in the United Nations Development Programme (UNDP)
- William Peters, high commissioner in Malawi
- Karen Pierce, current Permanent Representative of the United Kingdom to the United Nations
- Romano Prodi, President of the European Commission, 1999–2004
- Bertrand Ramcharan, UN High Commissioner for Human Rights
- Shridath Ramphal, former secretary-general of the Commonwealth
- Shaha Riza, World Bank
- Pierre Sane, UNESCO's assistant director-general for Social and Human Sciences
- Michele J. Sison, US Ambassador to Lebanon in the Bush Administration
- Lachezara Stoeva, Permanent Representative of Bulgaria to the United Nations and President of the United Nations Economic and Social Council
- Walter Tarnopolsky, Canadian judge and member of United Nations Human Rights Committee
- Arne Roy Walther, Norwegian ambassador to Japan
- Michael Wilson, Canadian Ambassador to the US, 2006–present

=== Central bankers ===
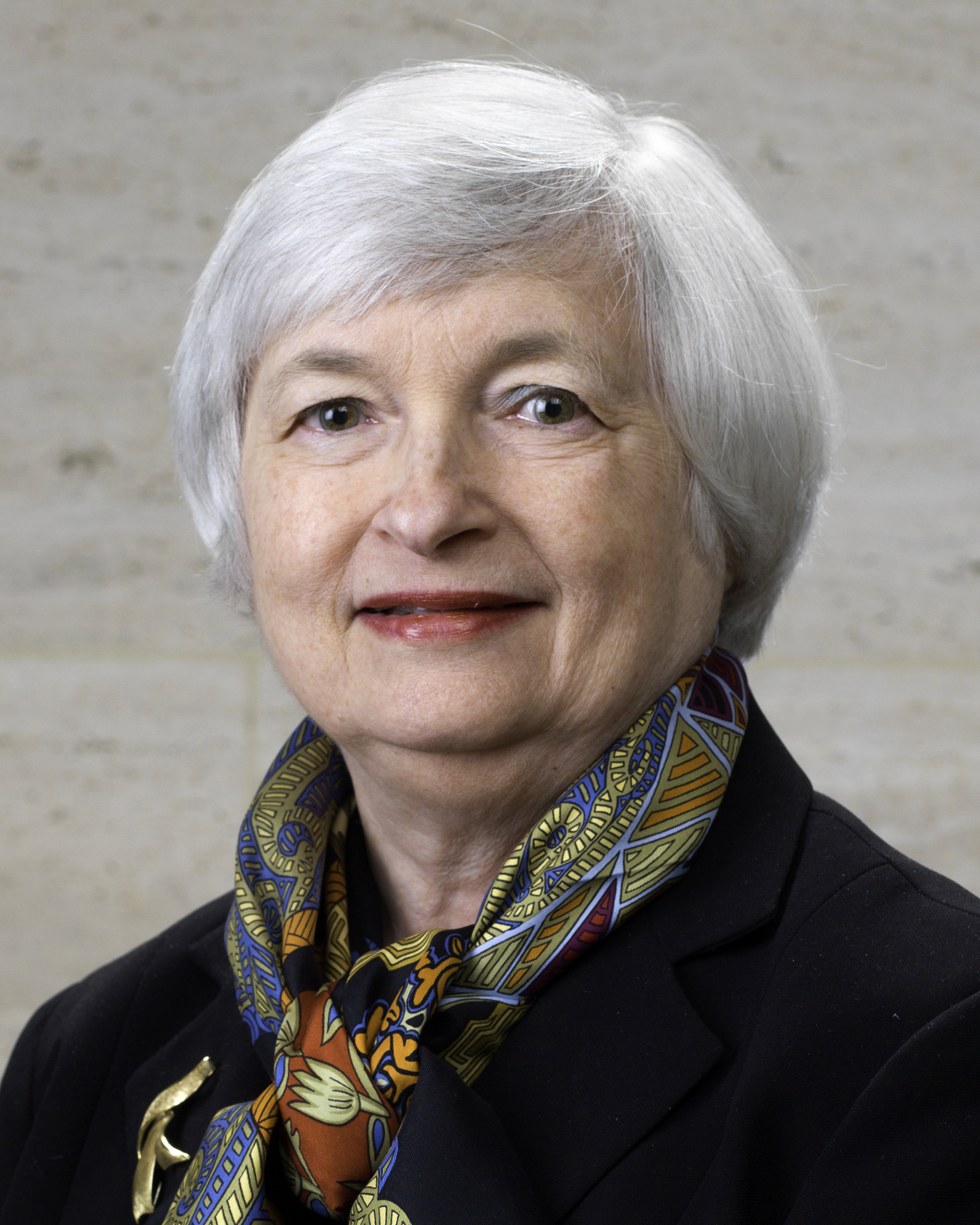
Janet Yellen, Chair of the US Federal Reserve, 2014–2018

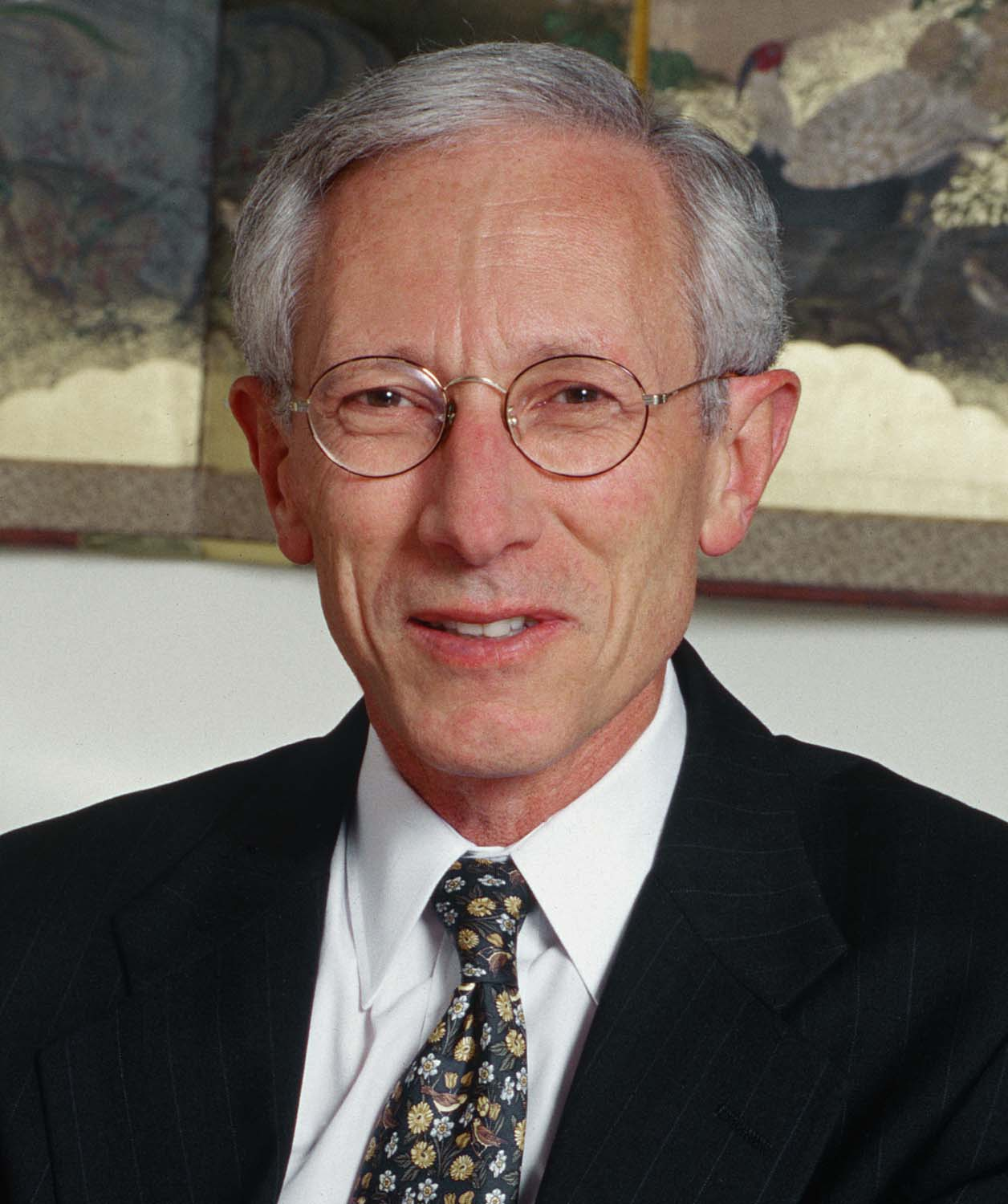
Stanley Fischer, Vice president of the US Federal Reserve, 2014–2017; governor of the Bank of Israel, 2005–2013

Mervyn King, governor of the Bank of England, 2003–2013

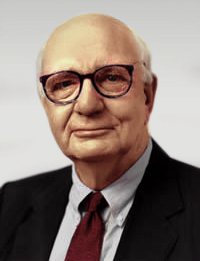
Paul Volcker, Chairman of the Federal Reserve, 1979–1987

Puey Ungpakorn, governor of the Central Bank of Thailand
- Charlie Bean, economist, member of the Bank of England's Monetary Policy Committee
- Tim Besley, economics professor and member of the Bank of England's Monetary Policy Committee
- Willem Buiter, economist, ex-member of the Bank of England's Monetary Policy Committee
- Michele Bullock, economist, governor of the Reserve Bank of Australia
- Nugget Coombs, governor of the Reserve Bank of Australia
- Stanley Fischer, governor of the Bank of Israel; former World Bank Chief Economist
- Neville Ubeysin-gha Jayawardena, Sri Lankan Sinhala economist, entrepreneur, and senator; first indigenous governor of the Central Bank of Sri Lanka
- Amarananda Somasiri Jayawardene, governor of the Central Bank of Sri Lanka
- Stephen Nickell, economist, ex-member of the Bank of England's Monetary Policy Committee
- Louis Rasminsky, governor of the Bank of Canada, 1961–1973
- Gordon Thiessen, governor of Bank of Canada 1994-2001, LSE PhD 1972, London UK
- Tharman Shanmugaratnam, President of Singapore, 2023–present; Chairman of the Monetary Authority of Singapore (MAS), 2011–2023

== Guy Medal (statistics) recipients ==
- 1945 Sir Maurice Kendall (Gold)
- 1976 James Durbin (Silver)
- 1978 Sir R. G. D. Allen (Gold)
- 1982 Henry Wynn (Silver)
- 2007 Howell Tong (Silver)
- 2008 James Durbin (Gold)

== Academics ==
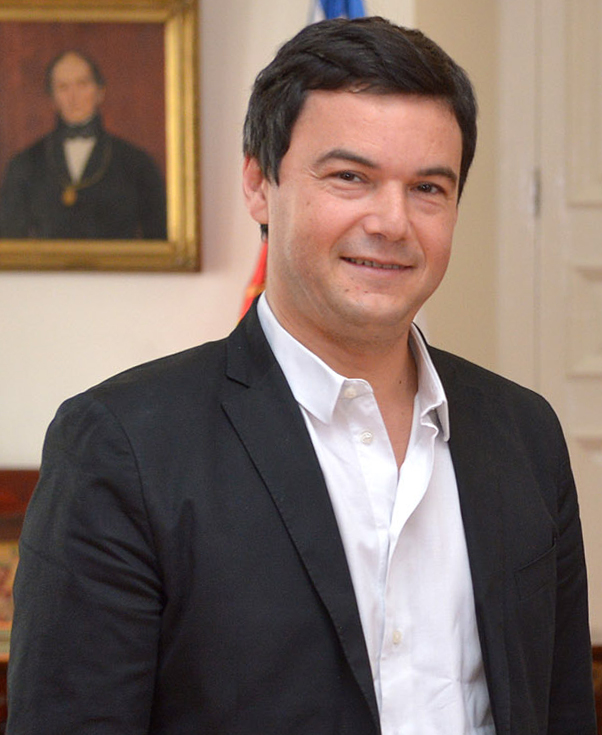
Thomas Piketty, author of Capital in the 21st Century

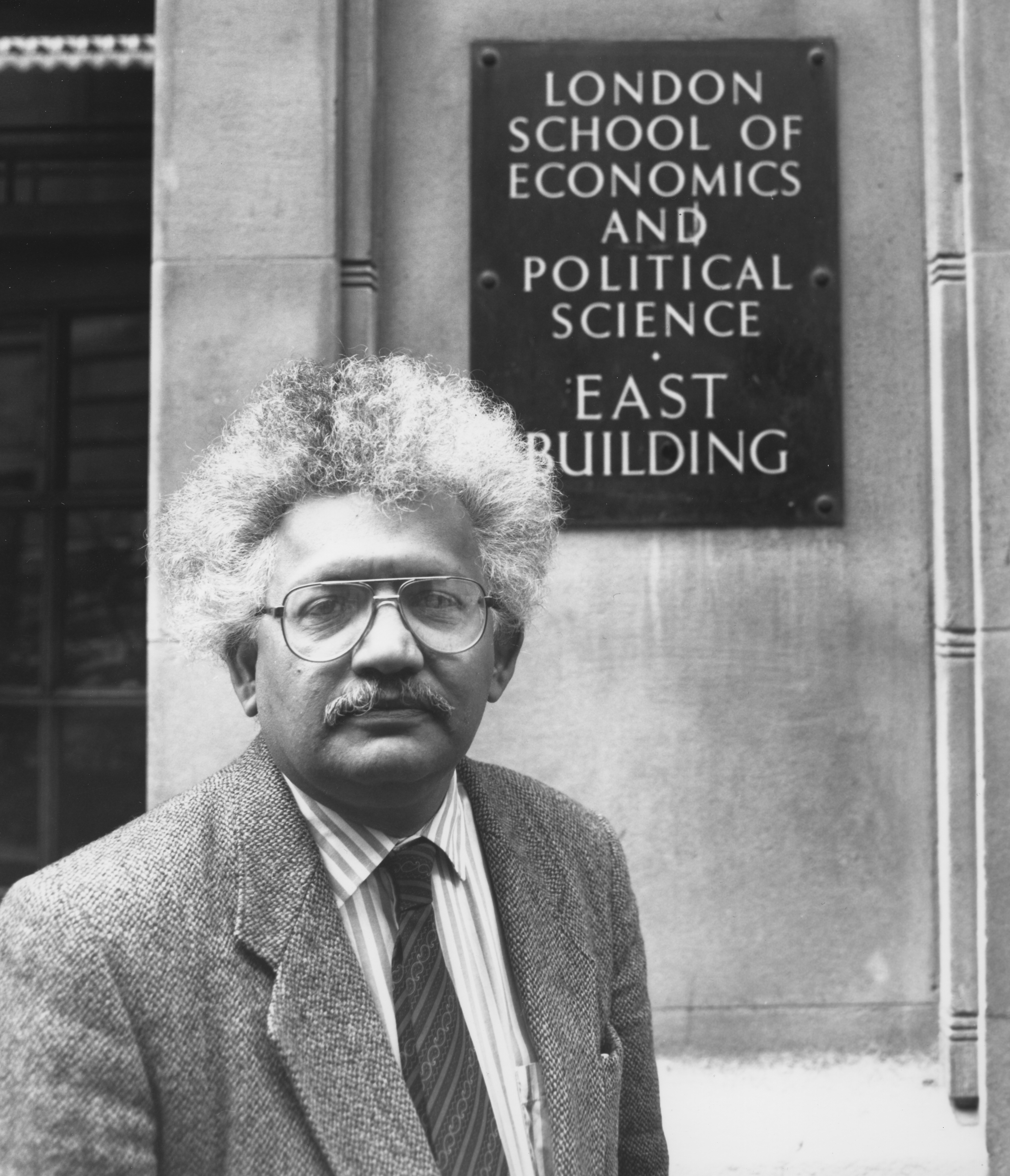
Meghnad Desai, Baron Desai, British-Indian economist and Labour politician

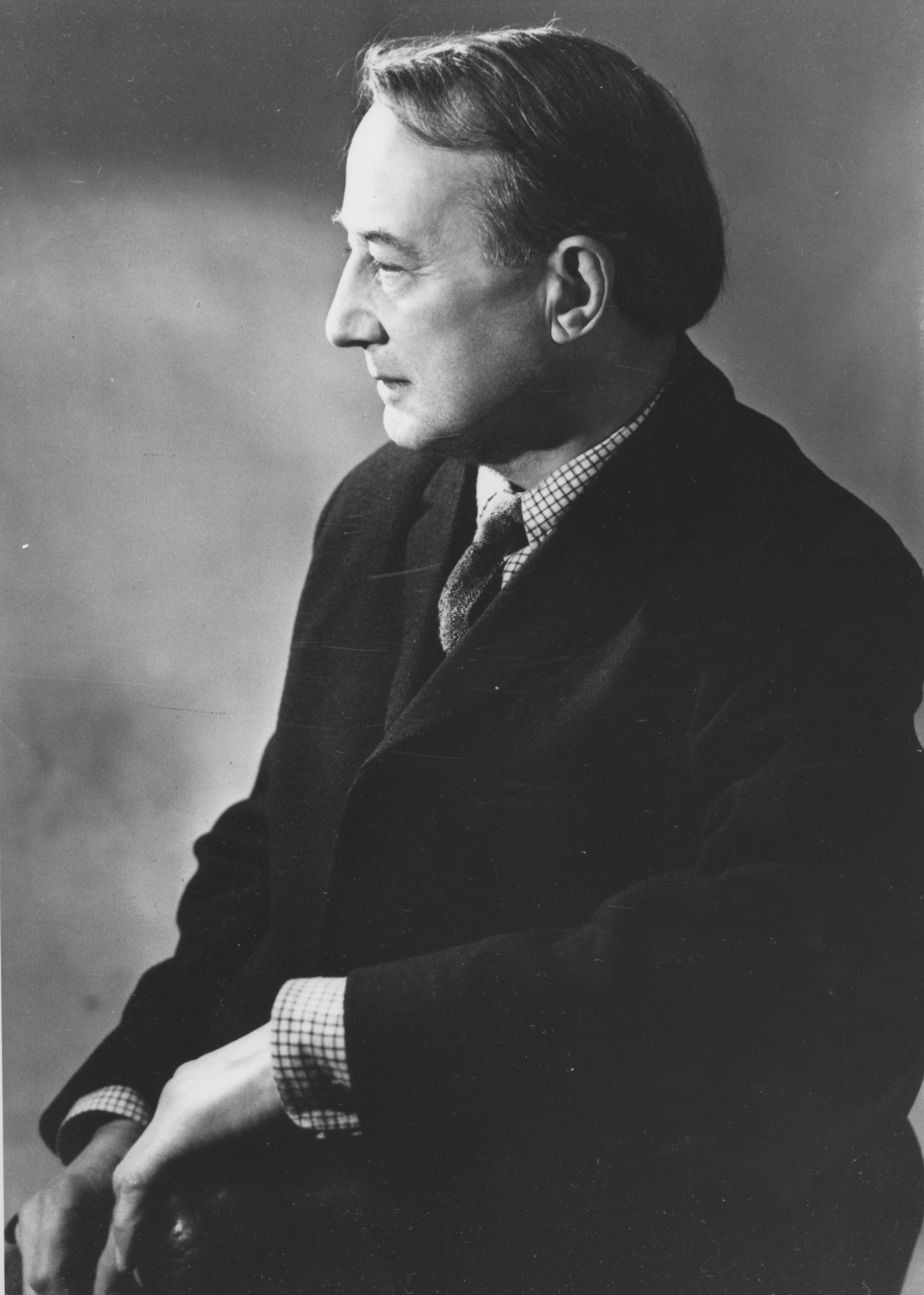
Michael Oakeshott, philosopher and conservative thinker

=== Economists ===
- Daron Acemoglu, economist, John Bates Clark Medal Winner 2005
- Sir Roy Allen, economist and mathematician
- Thomas Armbrüster, economist
- Heinz Wolfgang Arndt, economist
- Kaushik Basu, chief economist of the World Bank
- Peter Thomas Bauer, development economist
- William Baumol, professor of economics and director, C.V. Starr Center for Applied Economics, New York University
- Jo Beall, professor of development studies
- Walter Berns, scholar, American Enterprise Institute
- Sir Tim Besley, economist
- Kenneth Binmore, economist
- Sir Richard Blundell, economist and econometrician
- Sir Alan Budd, British economist, provost of The Queen's College, Oxford
- Francesco Caselli, economist
- Ronald Coase, economist and winner of the 1991 Nobel Memorial Prize in Economic Sciences
- Richard N. Cooper, Maurits C. Boas Professor of International Economics, Harvard University; previously chairman, National Intelligence Council and; Under Secretary of State for Economic
- Meghnad Desai, Baron Desai, development economist
- Miren Etxezarreta, economist
- Ian Goldin, development economist, director of Oxford Martin School, University of Oxford
- Charles Goodhart, economist, ex-member of Monetary Policy Committee
- W. M. Gorman, economist
- Sir Theodore Gregory, British economist, economic adviser to the Government of India 1938–1946
- Frank Hahn, economist
- Friedrich August von Hayek, CH, FBA, winner of the 1974 Nobel Memorial Prize in Economic Sciences with Gunnar Myrdal for their work on money and economic fluctuations, and the interdependence of economic, social and institutional phenomena
- David Forbes Hendry, British economist, currently professor of economics and head of the Economics Department at the University of Oxford
- Sir John Richards Hicks, winner of the 1972 Nobel Memorial Prize in Economic Sciences with Kenneth J. Arrow for their pioneering contributions to general equilibrium theory and welfare theory
- J.A. Hobson, economist and writer
- Samuel Hollander, British/Canadian/Israeli economist
- Eliot Janeway, American economist, economic advisor to Presidents Franklin D. Roosevelt and Lyndon B. Johnson
- Harry Johnson, Canadian economist
- Lewis Webster Jones, economist, fifteenth President of Rutgers University
- Nicholas Kaldor, economist
- Peter Kenen, economist
- Maurice Kugler, development economist
- Ludwig Lachmann, economist
- David Laidler, economist
- Richard Layard, Baron Layard, economist
- Peter Leeson, George Mason Economist
- Patrick Minford, economist
- Michio Morishima, Japanese economist
- Abhinay Muthoo, economist
- Mirabelle Muûls, Belgian economist and climate change researcher
- Andrew Oswald, economist
- Maurice Peston, Baron Peston of Mile End, economist and politician
- Peter C. B. Phillips, Sterling Professor of Economics and Professor of Statistics at Yale University
- William Phillips, economist, inventor of the Phillip's Curve
- Thomas Piketty, economist, author of Capital in the Twenty-First Century
- Arnold Plant, economist
- Mihir Rakshit, economist
- Ricardo Reis, economist
- Lionel Robbins, economist
- Tadeusz Rybczynski, Polish-born English economist, known for the development of the Rybczynski theorem
- Anthony Saunders, chairman, Department of Finance, Stern School of Business, New York University
- Tibor Scitovsky, economist
- Arthur Seldon, free market ideologue
- Amartya Sen, economist and Professor of Economics at LSE (1971-1977)
- Andrew Sentance, member of Monetary Policy Committee
- G.L.S. Shackle, economist
- Neil Shephard, econometrician
- Alasdair Smith, economist, former vice-chancellor at the University of Sussex
- Piero Sraffa, economist
- Nicholas Stern, economist
- Gary Stevenson, former trader; economic equality campaigner
- Paul Sweezy, Marxist economist
- Prajapati Trivedi, economist, First Secretary Performance Management to Government of India
- Sho-Chieh Tsiang, economist
- Adair Turner, Baron Turner of Ecchinswell, businessman, academic, chair of the UK Financial Services Authority
- John Van Reenen, economist, director of the Centre for Economic Performance at the London School of Economics
- Sushil Wadhwani, economist
- Sir Alan Walters, monetary economist
- Richard Werner, banking economist
- Basil Yamey, industrial economist
- Allyn Abbott Young, economist

=== Economic historians ===
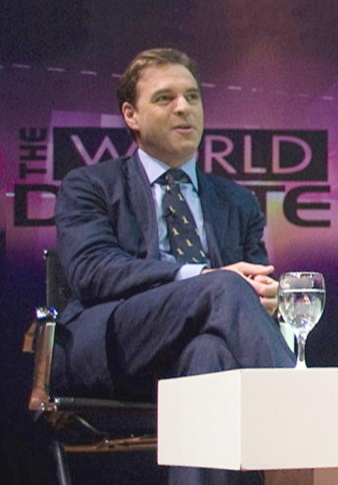
Niall Ferguson, historian

- Edwin Cannan, historian of economic thought, professor at LSE, 1895–1926
- Nick Crafts, professor of economic history at LSE, 1995–2005
- Kent Deng, East Asian economic historian
- Niall Ferguson, Philippe Roman Chair in History and International Affairs
- Lilian Knowles, first female professor of Economic History and first female Dean of Faculty, 1920s
- Mary S. Morgan, historian of economics
- Eileen Power, second woman to be appointed to the chair of Economic History
- R. H. Tawney, English writer; a leading advocate of Christian Socialism
- Donald Winch, professor of the history of economics at the University of Sussex

=== Employment relations and management ===
- Chrisanthi Avgerou, professor of information systems
- Claudio Ciborra (1951–2005), professor of information systems
- Morten Hansen, professor of management

=== Historians ===
- Tengku Muhammad Fa-iz Petra, Kelantan Royal Family
- Janet Coleman, historian of political thought
- Martin van Creveld, Israeli military historian and theorist
- James Joll, leading World War I historian
- Paul Kennedy, British historian specialising in international relations and grand strategy
- Alfred Marshall, historian and sociologist
- Desmond Morton, historian
- Sir Lewis Bernstein Namier, historian
- Rosemary O'Day, historian and author, Eileen Power student, 1970
- Ben Pimlott, Fabian president, modern historian, former president of the University of Nottingham
- A. L. Rowse, historian
- Sir Anthony Seldon, historian, biographer of Tony Blair and headmaster of Wellington College
- Avi Shlaim, historian specialising in the Middle East
- Alan Sked, leading Habsburg historian and founder of the United Kingdom Independence Party
- David Starkey, historian specialising in Tudor England
- G. E. M. de Ste. Croix, historian
- David Stevenson, World War One historian
- John Stubbs, historian, former president of Trent University and Simon Fraser University
- Jacob Talmon, historian
- Arnold Joseph Toynbee, historian
- Sir Charles Webster, Stevenson Professor of International History; diplomat and founder of the United Nations
- Odd Arne Westad, historian specialising in the Cold War and contemporary East Asian history

=== Human geography ===
- Harold Brookfield (PhD 1950), emeritus professor, Australian National University
- George Jonas, founder of social geography; professor of geography at LSE (1958–1983)
- Halford Mackinder, geographer and LSE director (1903–1908)
- Eric Neumayer, professor of Environment and Development at LSE; acting LSE director and vice-chancellor (2023–2024)
- Andrés Rodríguez-Pose, professor of economic geography (1996–present), former head of Geography department (2006–2009)
- Laurence Dudley Stamp, geographer
- Michael Storper, economic and urban geographer; LSE Centennial Professor of Economic Geography at LSE (2000–present)
- Harry Pettit, geographer and former assistant professor at Radboud University Nijmegen (2023-2025)

=== International relations ===
- Daniele Archibugi, former visiting professor of international relations
- Coral Bell, reader in international relations, 1965–1972
- Hedley Bull, professor of international relations
- Barry Buzan, professor of international relations
- Michael Cox, professor of international relations
- Sara Hagemann, assistant professor at LSE's European Institute
- Fred Halliday, professor of international relations (Montague Burton Chair), to 2008
- David Held, professor of international relations
- Kimberly Hutchings, professor of international relations
- Mary Kaldor, professor of international relations
- Parag Khanna, specialist in geopolitics and globalisation, managing partner of FutureMap and former managing partner of Hybrid Reality; co-founder and CEO of Factotum
- Richard W. Lyman, former provost and president of Stanford University; founder of Stanford Institute for International Studies
- Tara McCormack, academic and author
- F. S. Northedge, former professor of international relations
- Susan Strange, professor of international relations (Montague Burton Chair), 1978–1988
- Leonard Suransky, winner of Des Lee Visiting Lectureship in Global Awareness at Webster University
- Martin Wight, reader in international relations, 1949–1960

=== Law ===
- Antony T. Anghie, law professor at the National University of Singapore Faculty of Law and Secretary-general of the Asian Society of International Law
- Andrew Ashworth, Vinerian Professor of English Law at Oxford
- Janice R. Bellace, Samuel A. Blank Professor of Legal Studies and Business Ethics, University of Pennsylvania, founding president of the Singapore Management University
- Julia Black, president-elect of the British Academy, strategic director of innovation and professor of law at the London School of Economics
- Robert Carnwath, Lord Carnwath of Notting Hill, Visiting Professor in Practice at the Grantham Research Institute at the London School of Economics, former Justice of the Supreme Court of the United Kingdom
- Aminullah Chaudhry, Pakistan bureaucrat and remained Principal Secretary to the Prime Minister of Pakistan and director general (DG), Civil Aviation Authority (CAA)
- Hugh Collins, Vinerian Professor of English Law at Oxford, former head of the Law Department at LSE and general editor of the Modern Law Review
- Talbot "Sandy" D'Alemberte, former president of the American Bar Association, and former president of the Florida State University
- Paul Davies, Cassel Professor of Commercial Law at LSE, Honorary KC
- Albert Venn Dicey, English jurist
- Neil Duxbury, Professor of English Law at LSE
- John Hart Ely, 10th Dean of Stanford Law School
- Conor Gearty, Professor of Human Rights Law at LSE, founder member of the Matrix Chambers
- J. A. G. Griffith, Welsh legal scholar, Professor of Public Law at LSE, Chancellor of the University of Manchester
- Joseph Grundfest, W. A. Franke Professor of Law and Business, Stanford Law School
- Jeremy Horder, former Law Commissioner for England and Wales, professor of law at Oxford University and LSE
- Sir Otto Kahn-Freund, professor of comparative law at Oxford, and a scholar in labour law
- Robert F. Kennedy Jr., son of politician Robert F. Kennedy, law professor at Pace University School of Law
- Beong-Soo Kim, 13th president of the University of Southern California
- Martti Koskenniemi, Centennial Professor at the Law Department of LSE, Professor of International Law in the University of Helsinki and director of the Erik Castrén Institute of International Law and Human Rights
- Nicola Lacey, professor of law, gender and social policy at LSE, professor of criminal law and legal theory at the University of Oxford
- Ewan McKendrick, Herbert Smith Professor of English Private Law at Oxford, Registrar of the University of Oxford
- Sir David Hughes Parry, Professor of English law, 1930–1959
- Sir Nigel Simon Rodley, Professor of Law and Chair of the Human Rights Centre, University of Essex, Member of the UN Human Rights Committee, 2001–2016
- Gerry Simpson, chair in Public International Law at LSE, professor of law at the University of Melbourne
- Raymond Wacks, Emeritus Professor of Law and Legal Theory and head of Department of Law (1986-1993), University of Hong Kong
- Dame Sarah Elizabeth Worthington, Pro-Director of LSE (with responsibility for research and external relations) 2005–2010, Deputy High Court Judge in the Chancery Division
- Elham Youssefian, Iranian human rights lawyer
- Michael Zander, professor emeritus, Legal Correspondent of The Guardian newspaper, 1963–1988

=== Linguists ===
- Geoffrey Sampson, linguist

=== Philosophers ===
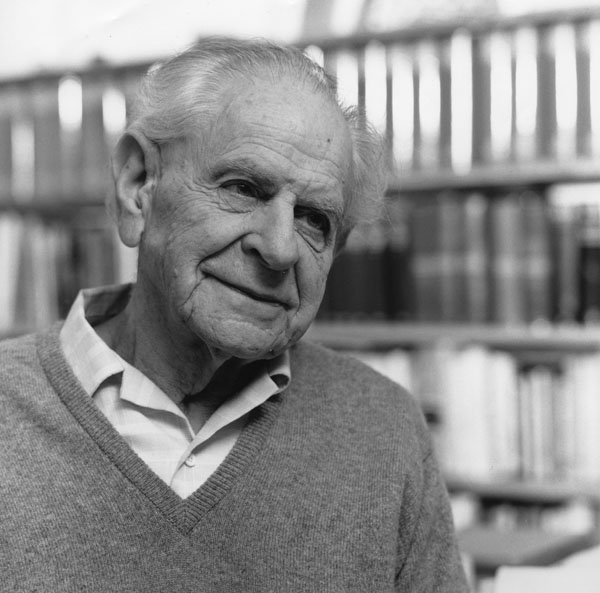
Karl Popper, Austro-British philosopher and professor at LSE

- Joseph Agassi, philosopher
- Brian Barry, moral and political philosopher
- William Warren Bartley, philosopher
- John Lane Bell, mathematical logician
- Kenneth Binmore, philosopher, economist and mathematician
- Nick Bostrom, philosopher
- Luc Bovens, philosopher
- Craig Callender, philosopher
- Nancy Cartwright, philosopher of science
- Sir Bernard Crick, political philosopher
- Helena Cronin, Darwinist philosopher
- Gregory Currie, philosopher
- Daniel Dennett, philosopher and cognitive scientist

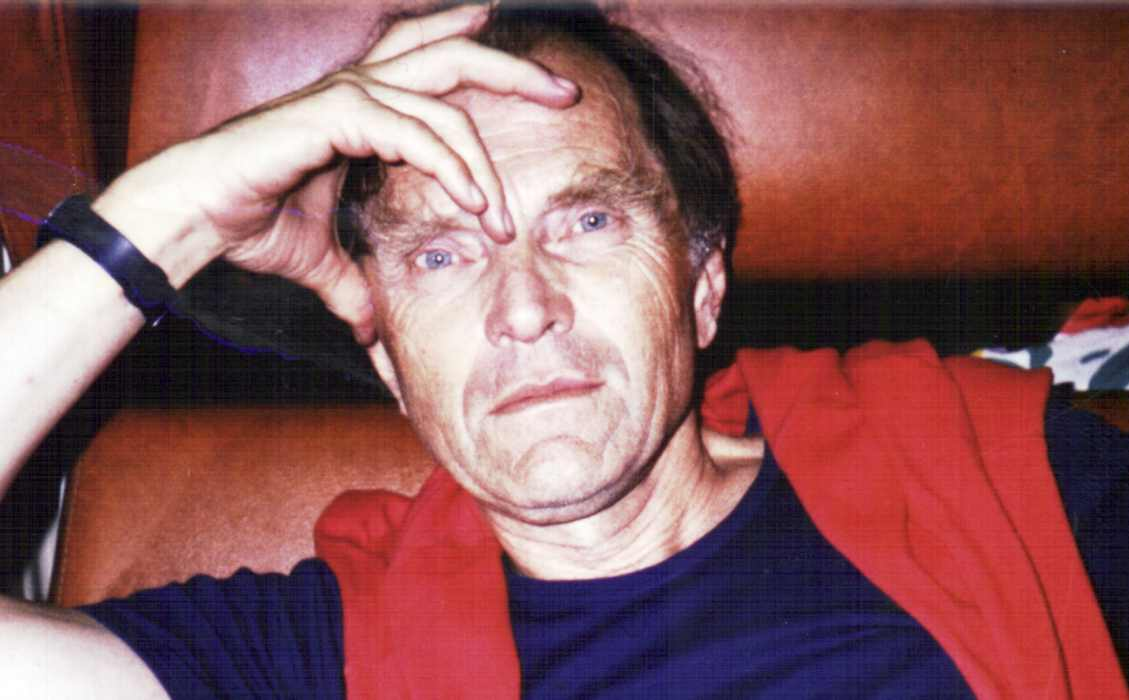
Paul Feyerabend

- Paul Feyerabend, philosopher
- Peter S. Fosl, philosopher
- Ernest Gellner, philosopher
- John Gray, political philosopher
- Horace Romano Harré, philosopher
- Colin Howson, philosopher
- Chandran Kukathas, political theorist
- Imre Lakatos, philosopher of science
- Shirley Robin Letwin, political philosopher
- Christian List, philosopher
- David Makinson, philosopher and mathematical logician
- Nicholas Maxwell, philosopher
- David Miller, philosopher
- Alan Musgrave, philosopher
- Michael Oakeshott, philosopher
- Samir Okasha, philosopher of science
- Michael Otsuka, moral and political philosopher
- Sir Karl Popper, philosopher
- Graham Priest, philosopher
- Wlodek Rabinowicz, philosopher
- Eric Scerri, philosopher of chemistry
- Jeremy Shearmur, philosopher
- Elliott Sober, philosopher of biology
- Jeremy Stangroom, philosopher
- John Worrall, philosopher of science

=== Political scientists ===
- Benjamin Barber, professor of political science, University of Maryland, College Park
- Sir Ernest Barker, political scientist, principal of King's College London, 1920–1927
- Scott Barrett, professor of political science at Johns Hopkins University
- Sarah Gibson Blanding, Vassar College's sixth president and first female president
- Verity Burgmann, professor of political science, University of Melbourne
- Satyabrata Rai Chowdhuri, political scientist, diplomat and author
- William Christian, political scientist at the University of Guelph
- Alasdair Cochrane, political theorist and ethicist, Professor of Political Theory at the University of Sheffield
- Ivor Martin Crewe, political scientist, Vice-Chancellor of University of Essex
- Sir Bernard Crick, political theorist
- Robert Falkner, political scientist
- Marianne Githens, American political scientist, feminist, author, and Elizabeth Conolly Todd Distinguished Professor of Goucher College
- Amy Gutmann, political scientist, president of the University of Pennsylvania
- James Jupp, British-Australian political scientist and author
- Harold Laski, political scientist and economist, colleague of Albert Einstein
- Jim Leach, John L. Weinberg Visiting Professor of Public and International Affairs at the Woodrow Wilson School of Princeton University
- Steven Lukes, political and social theorist
- Shireen Mazari, political scientist from Pakistan
- Ralph Miliband, political scientist
- Kenneth Minogue, Australian political scientist
- Margaret Moore, political theorist
- Brendan O'Leary, Irish political scientist, Lauder Professor of Political Science at the University of Pennsylvania
- Bhikhu Parekh, Baron Parekh, political theorist
- Louis Pauly, political scientist
- Nicola Phillips – Vice-Chancellor of Adelaide University (2026–); former professor of political economy at University of Melbourne
- William A. Robson, lecturer and professor of public administration, London School of Economics
- Peter Self, professor of public administration, London School of Economics
- Gordon Smith, professor of politics and government, London School of Economics
- Jill Vickers, political scientist
- Ken Young, UK public policy and politics of the early Cold War, King's College London

=== Sociologists ===
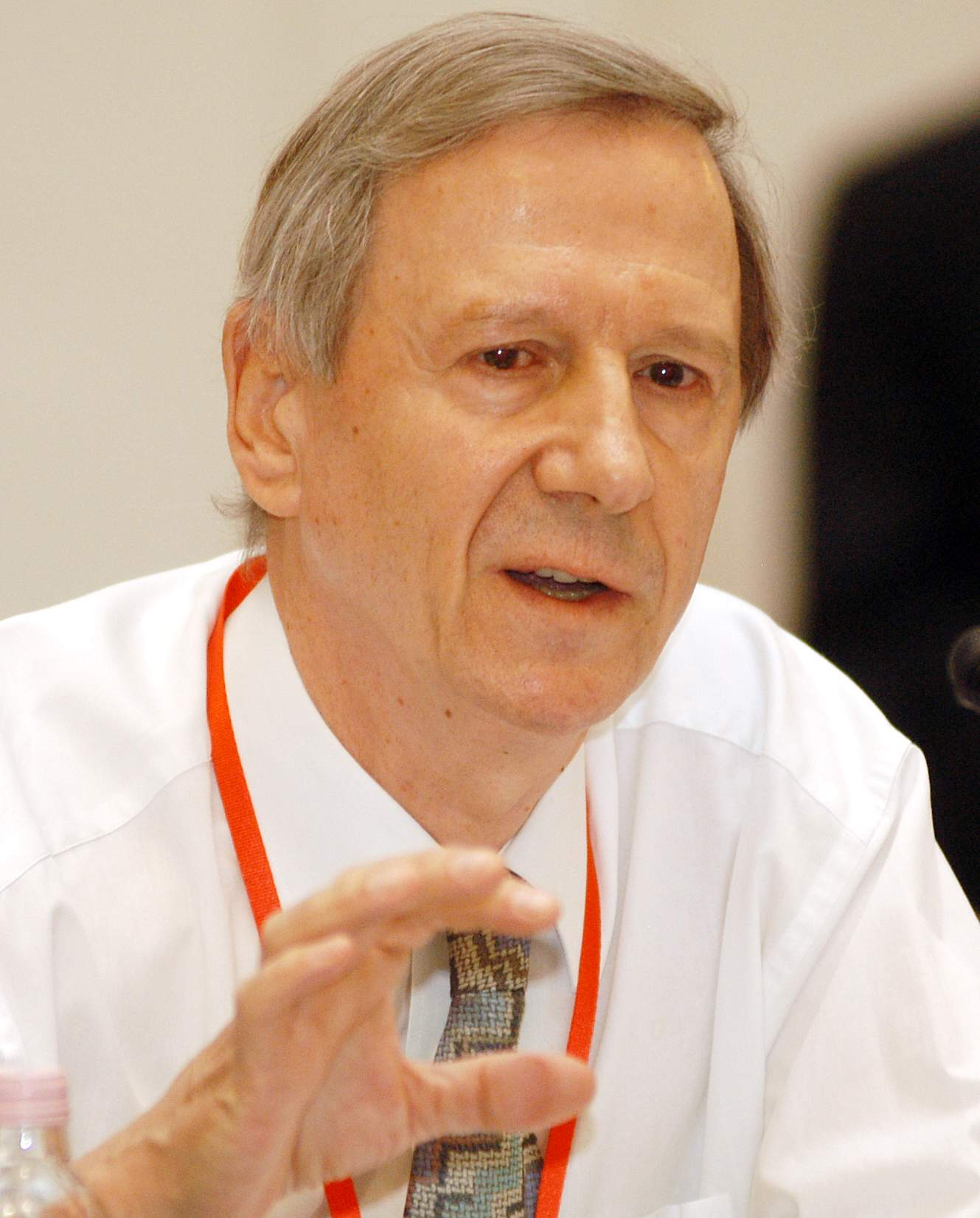
Anthony Giddens, current Emeritus Professor at LSE

- Peter Abell, founding director of Interdisciplinary Institute of Management
- Helmut Anheier, founder of the Centre for Civil Society and Dean of the Hertie School of Governance
- Eileen Barker, sociology of religion
- Zygmunt Bauman, Polish-born sociologist
- Ulrich Beck, sociologist
- Robin Blackburn, sociologist
- Tessa Blackstone, educationalist
- Stanley Cohen, sociologist
- Peter Davis, sociologist
- Norbert Elias, leading sociologist
- Anthony Giddens, sociologist renowned for his theory of structuration, and former director of the school
- Paul Gilroy, sociologist
- Jocelyn Hyslop, social worker and educator
- Ernest Krausz (1931–2018), Israeli professor of sociology and president at Bar Ilan University
- Michael Mann, sociologist
- Karl Mannheim, sociologist
- Robert McKenzie, Canadian sociologist and psephologist
- José Guilherme Merquior, sociologist and literary critic
- Andrew Milner, sociologist of literature
- Talcott Parsons, sociologist
- John Porter, sociologist
- Nikolas Rose, sociologist
- Saskia Sassen, sociologist and economist
- Mike Savage, sociologist
- Richard Sennett, sociologist
- France Winddance Twine, sociologist
- Hilary Wainwright, sociologist

=== Social anthropology ===
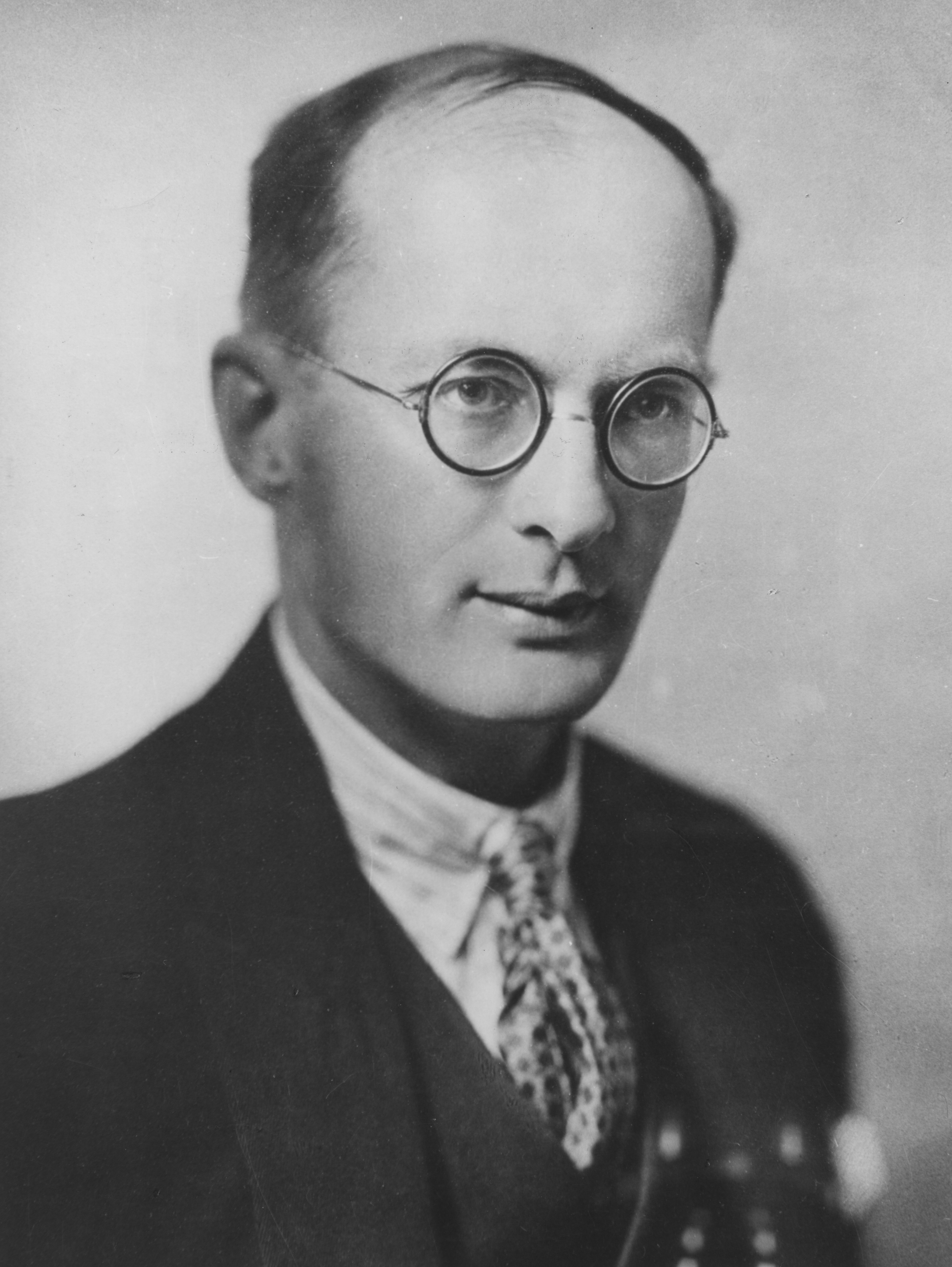
Bronislaw Malinowski, eminent anthropologist and functionalist

- Fredrik Barth, anthropologist
- Laura Bear, anthropologist
- Maurice Bloch, marxist and cognitive anthropologist
- Jean Comaroff, anthropologist
- John Comaroff, anthropologist
- Maria Czaplicka, Polish cultural anthropologist
- Jack Herbert Driberg, anthropologist
- E.E. Evans-Pritchard, anthropologist
- Fei Xiaotong, anthropologist
- Sir Raymond Firth, ethnologist, founder of economic anthropology
- Rosemary Firth, ethnologist
- Meyer Fortes, anthropologist
- Alfred Gell, anthropologist
- David Graeber, anthropologist, anarchist and activist
- Deborah James, anthropologist
- Phyllis Kaberry, anthropologist
- Adam Kuper, anthropologist
- David Lan, anthropologist and film maker
- Edmund Leach, anthropologist
- Alan Macfarlane, social anthropologist and historian
- Lucy Mair, anthropologist
- Bronisław Malinowski, anthropologist
- Z.K. Mathews, prominent Apartheid-era South African academic
- Ashley Montagu, anthropologist
- Hortense Powdermaker, anthropologist and ethnographer
- Philip Proudfoot, anthropologist and politician
- Alfred Radcliffe-Brown, anthropologist
- Audrey Richards, anthropologist, nutritional anthropologist
- Isaac Schapera, anthropologist
- Charles Gabriel Seligman, ethnographer
- Dan Sperber, anthropologist
- Charles Stafford, anthropologist
- Michael Taussig, prominent 'postmodern' anthropologist
- Lionel Tiger, Charles Darwin Professor of Anthropology at Rutgers University
- Edward Westermarck, anthropologist
- Harvey Whitehouse, cognitive anthropologist

=== Social policy analysts and workers ===
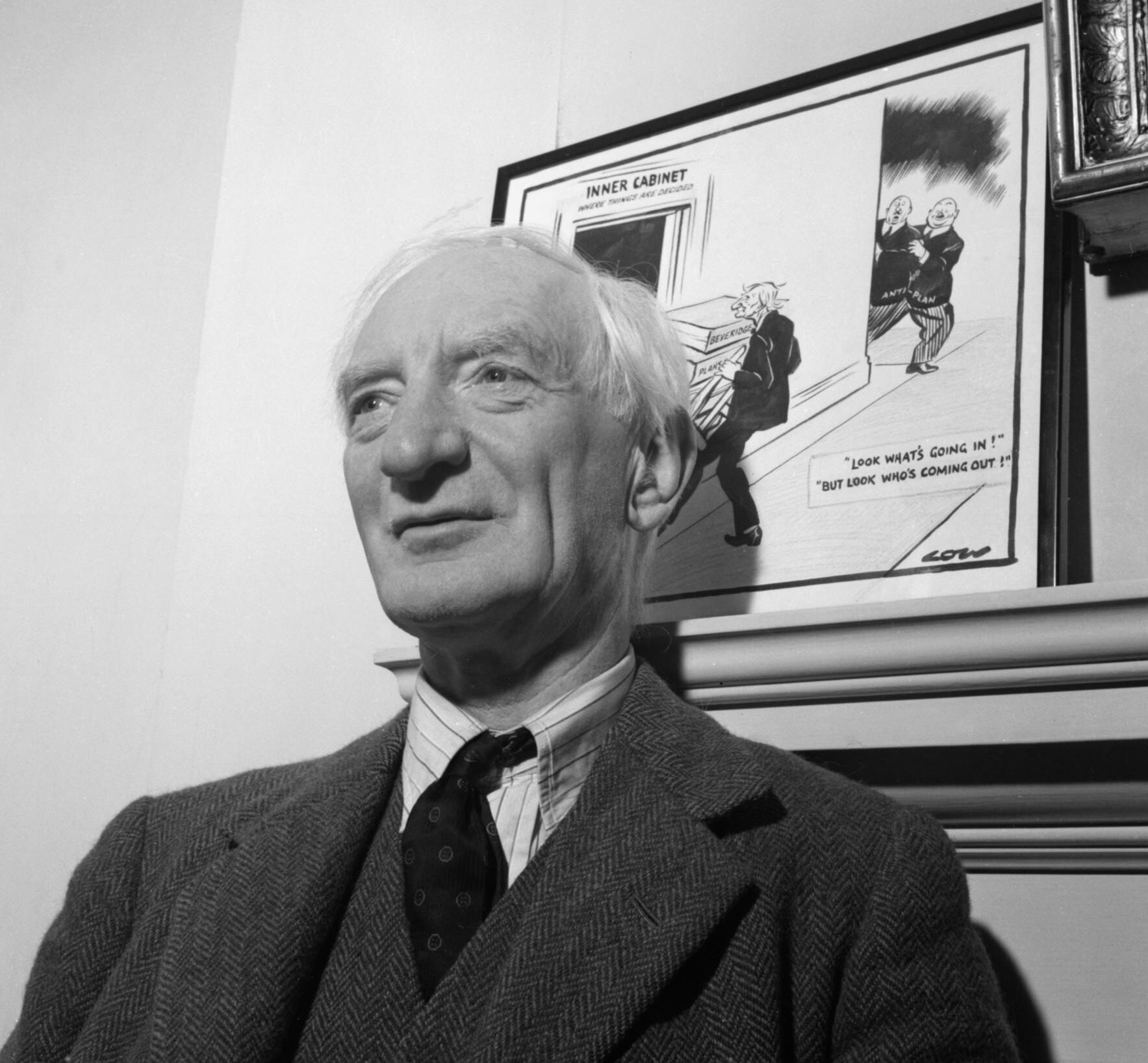
William Beveridge, the author of the Beveridge Report and former director of LSE

- William Beveridge, former director of LSE
- Winifred Cavenagh, Professor of Social Administration and Criminology at Birmingham University
- Emily Grundy, Professor of Demography
- Martin Knapp, Chair of LSE Health and Social Care
- Julian Le Grand, Richard Titmuss Professor of Social Policy, senior advisor to Prime Minister Tony Blair
- Jane Lewis, Professor Emeritus of Social Policy
- Tim Newburn, professor of criminology and current president of the British Society of Criminology
- Augustus Nuwagaba, associate professor at Makerere University
- Richard Titmuss, founder of the academic discipline of social policy
- Peter Townsend, professor of social policy
- Roger Zogolovitch, architect and developer, director of the Infrastructure and Development course (1998–2003)

=== Social psychology ===
- Martin Bauer, psychologist
- Howard Gardner, American psychologist, best known for his theory of multiple intelligences
- Nicholas Humphrey, psychologist
- Satoshi Kanazawa, evolutionary psychologist
- Geoffrey Miller, evolutionary psychologist
- J. Philippe Rushton, psychologist
- Andrew Samuels, psychologist
- Graham Wallas, social psychologist, educationalist, and a leader of the Fabian Society
- Paul Webley, director and principal of the School of Oriental and African Studies, University of London

=== Statisticians ===
- Sir R. G. D. Allen, president of the Royal Statistical Society
- D. J. Bartholomew, Professor of Statistics and President of the Royal Statistical Society, 1993–1995
- Daasebre Oti Boateng, Ghanaian Government statistician and head of the Statistical Service 1982–2000, first black Chairman of the United Nations Statistical Commission in 1987
- Sir Arthur Bowley, statistician
- D. G. Champernowne, Professor of Statistical Economics
- W. Edwards Deming, statistician, economist
- Sir Ian Diamond, statistician, Principal and Vice-Chancellor of the University of Aberdeen
- James Durbin, statistician, econometrician
- John Hajnal, statistician
- W.D. Hamilton, mathematical biologist and demographer
- Sir Maurice George Kendall, statistician
- Leslie Kish, statistician
- John Denis Sargan, statistician
- Nate Silver, American statistician
- Howell Tong, statistician
- Henry Wynn, president of the Royal Statistical Society in 1977

== Arts and media ==
=== Film, music and performance ===
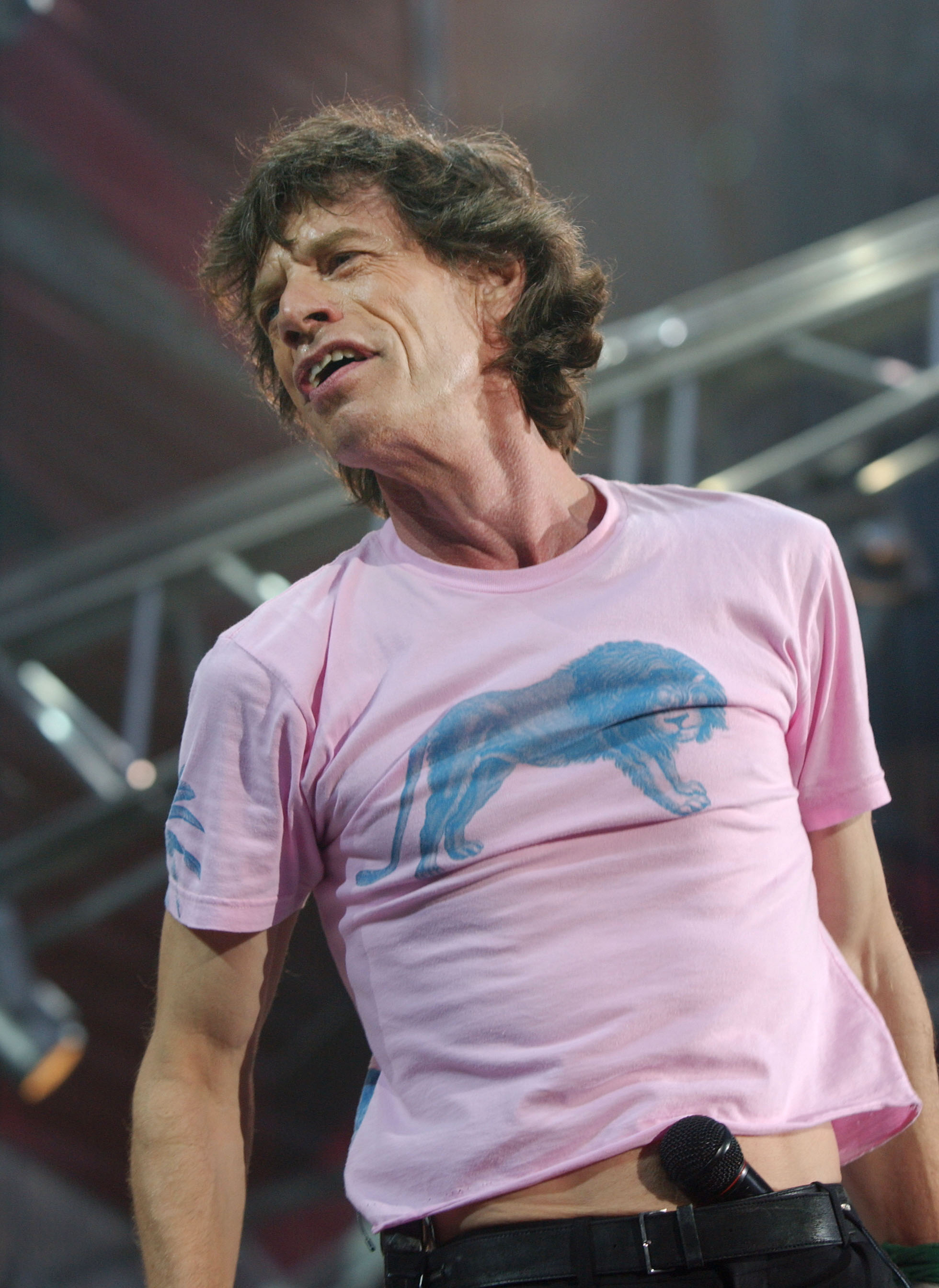
Sir Mick Jagger

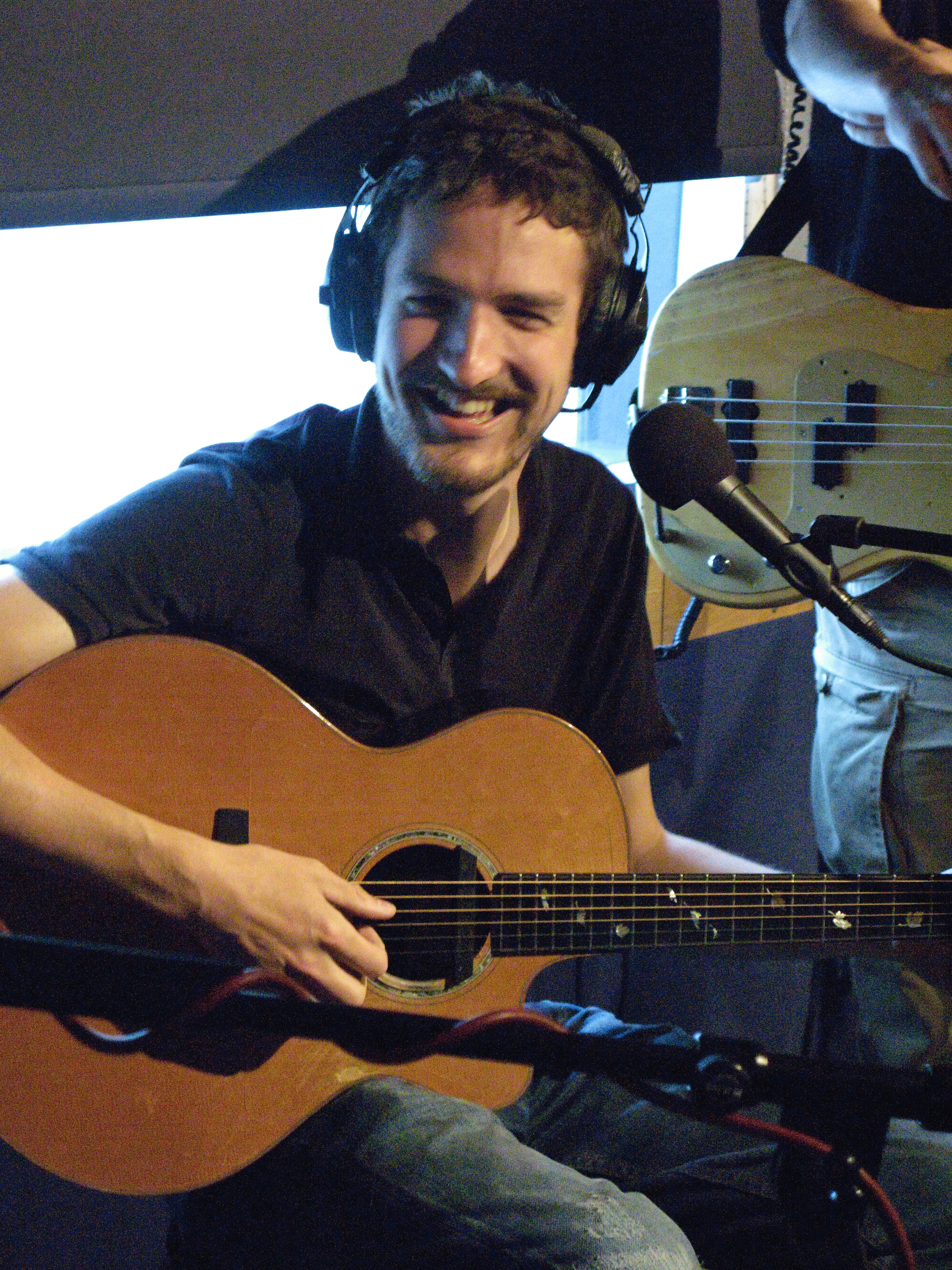
Frank Turner

- Sylvia Anderson (nee Thamm), producer, writer, voice actor
- Greg Barker, documentary filmmaker, director of Ghosts of Rwanda
- Rhian Benson, Ghanaian and Welsh soul and jazz singer-songwriter
- Ralph Brown, actor, writer (Withnail & I, Alien 3, Wayne's World 2)
- Sophie Choudry, Indian actress
- Quds Al Yahyai, Omani American Billionaire Heiress
- Mick Jagger, British musician, lead vocalist of the Rolling Stones
- Angelina Jolie, film actress and activist
- Judge Jules (real name: Jules O'Riordan), Radio 1 DJ
- Katell Keineg, singer/songwriter
- Soha Ali Khan, Indian actress
- Arif Mardin, Turkish music producer
- Metis, American musician
- Mika, Beirut-born British/American singer
- Arnon Milchan, Israeli independent Hollywood film producer who has been linked to Mossad
- Ron Moody, British actor, famous for playing Fagin in Oliver!
- Jaime Murray, actress
- Scott Neustadter, Hollywood writer; 500 Days of Summer is based on a romance at LSE
- Mat Osman, bass player for Suede
- Edward R. Pressman, film producer (Wall Street, Das Boot, Thank You for Smoking)
- David Rodigan, reggae DJ
- Allan Segal, BAFTA-winning documentary film maker
- Kabir Sehgal, Multi-Grammy and Emmy winning artist and NYT bestselling author
- Tara Sharma, Indian actress
- Sophie Solomon, British violinist, songwriter and composer
- Robin Spry, filmmaker
- Frank Turner, musician, in the band Million Dead, now a solo artist; wrote his final year dissertation while on tour with Million Dead
- Oliver Weindling, jazz promoter and founder of the Babel jazz record label
- Frederick M. Zollo, Academy Award-nominated producer

=== Television and radio ===
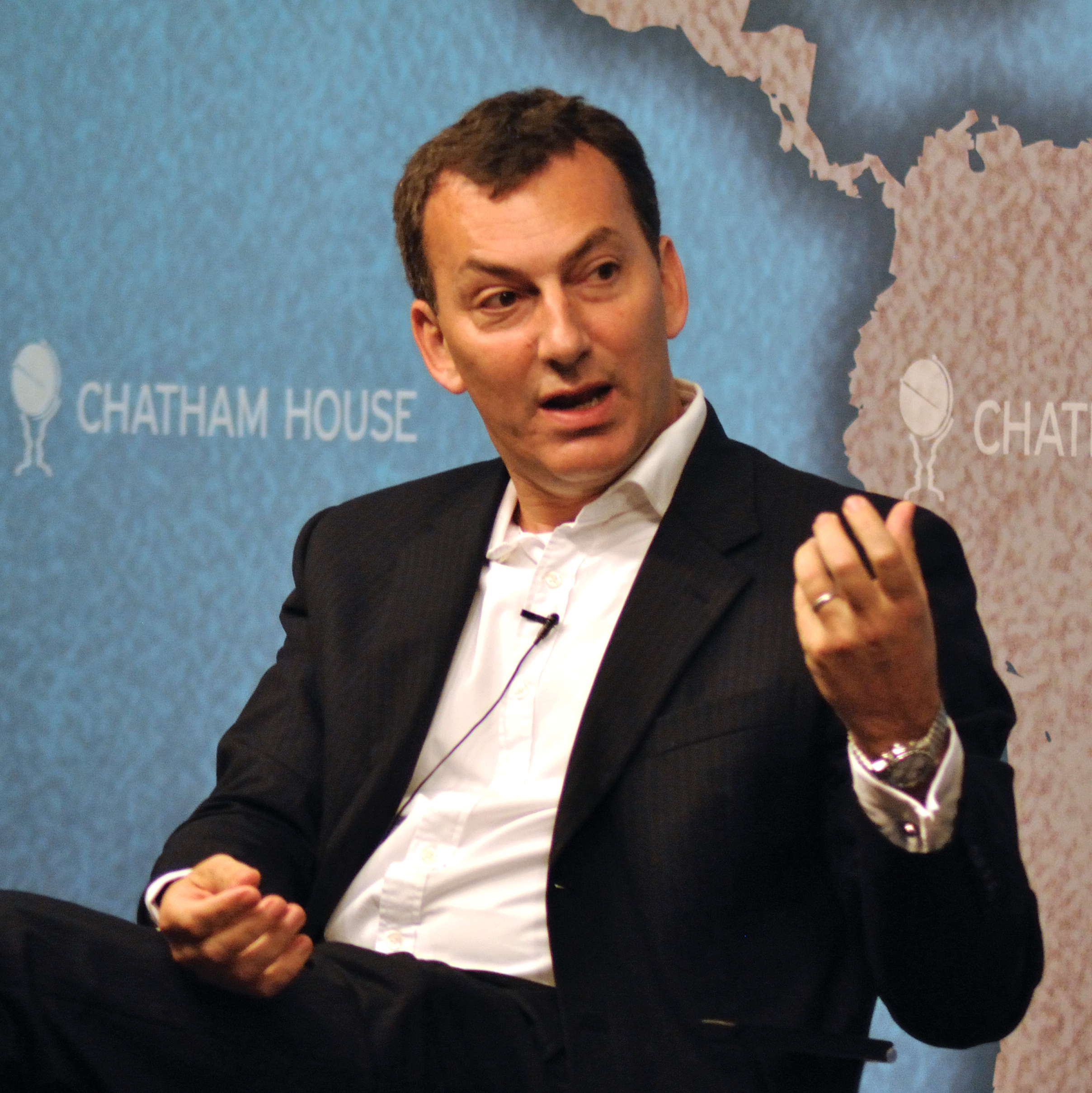
Mark Urban, historian and journalist

- David Attenborough, BBC presenter and naturalist
- Zeina Awad, reporter, TRT WORLD
- Jana Bennett, head of vision, BBC
- Bidisha, broadcaster and writer
- Jon Blair, Academy Award, British Academy Award and Emmy-winning producer and director
- Josh Chetwynd, baseball presenter
- Gary Delaney, stand-up comedian
- Martin Durkin, TV director
- Loyd Grossman, TV chef/presenter
- Robert Kilroy-Silk, TV presenter, politician and Eurosceptic former MEP
- Hari Kondabolu, stand-up comedian
- Martin Lewis, TV presenter and money saving expert
- Sean McGuiness, Top Gear producer
- James O'Brien, radio journalist
- Mark Urban, Newsnight diplomatic editor
- Huw Wheldon, former MD of BBC TV

=== Authors and journalists ===
- Edith Abbott, author and social worker, Carnegie Postgraduate Fellowship 1906
- Eric Alterman, Professor of English at Brooklyn College; political columnist for The Nation
- Anne Applebaum, journalist and author
- Pat Barker, author, historian
- Peter Bart, journalist and film producer
- Sally Belfrage, journalist and author
- Julia Belluz, senior health correspondent for Vox
- Melissa Benn, journalist and feminist
- Owen Bennett-Jones, BBC World Service journalist
- Josh Chetwynd, baseball presenter, player and writer
- Andrew Coyne, national editor for Maclean's
- Rhian Edwards, poet
- Robert Elms, radio presenter, music journalist
- Ekow Eshun, BBC Newsnight broadcaster, and TV host
- Leslie Finer, British journalist and author
- Daniel Finkelstein, Comment Editor of The Times
- Simon Garfield, The Observer journalist; author of Mauve and Our Hidden Lives
- Yvonne Green, poet, writer, barrister
- Edward Greenspon, editor-in-chief of The Globe and Mail newspaper
- Tom Happold, editor of The Guardian
- Judith Hare, Countess of Listowel, journalist and author
- John Honderich, former publisher of the Toronto Star
- Jack Houghteling, novelist
- Tim Judah, journalist and author
- Robert Kaiser, American author and journalist
- Parag Khanna, author
- To Kit (real name: Chip Tsao), Hong Kong-based columnist-broadcaster
- Naomi Klein, author of No Logo and The Shock Doctrine
- Robert Kuttner, journalist and economics author
- Kirsty Lang, broadcaster and journalist
- Philippe Legrain, British journalist and writer
- Bernard Levin, journalist, author and broadcaster
- Michael Lewis, best selling author and financial journalist; contributing writer to the New York Times Magazine and Bloomberg
- Rod Liddle, journalist, TV presenter, former editor of BBC Radio 4's Today programme
- Tim Lott, journalist and Whitbread Book Awards-winning author
- Edward Lucas, journalist
- Hilary Mantel, writer, Man Booker Prize winner in 2009 and 2012, the first woman to receive the award twice
- Kingsley Martin, former editor of the New Statesman
- China Miéville, writer, PhD International Relations 2001
- Keith Murdoch, journalist and the father of Rupert Murdoch
- Tinius Nagell-Erichsen, Norwegian publisher of Aftenposten and Verdens Gang
- Maajid Nawaz, author and activist
- Yvonne Ndege, journalist
- Nisha Pillai, BBC World presenter
- Peter Pomerantsev, journalist
- Aroon Purie, Indian media mogul; founding editor and editor in chief of India Today and chairman of TV Today Network Limited
- Nabila Ramdani, French-Algerian journalist
- Christopher Ruddy, journalist, CEO of Newsmax Media, formerly with the New York Post and Pittsburgh Tribune-Review
- Edward Taylor Scott, journalist, former editor and co-owner of The Guardian
- Barbara Serra, journalist and TV news reader
- Joss Sheldon, author
- Michael Whitney Straight, publisher and novelist
- Mitchell Symons, journalist and author
- Paul Tansey, economics editor for The Irish Times
- Sander Vanocur, journalist, NBC
- Siddharth Varadarajan, journalist and editor
- Stuart Varney, Peabody Award-winning economic journalist
- Justin Webb, presenter Today programme on BBC Radio 4
- Jacqueline Wheldon, novelist
- Xu Zhimo, early 20th-century Chinese poet

=== Pulitzer Prize winners ===
Year	Recipient	Prize
1968	Nick Kotz	Pulitzer Prize for National Reporting
1987	Anne Applebaum	Pulitzer Prize for General Nonfiction
1990	David A. Vise	Pulitzer Prize for Explanatory Journalism
1993	Roy Gutman	Pulitzer Prize for International Reporting
1994	David Levering Lewis	Pulitzer Prize for Biography or Autobiography
2000	John Bersia	Pulitzer Prize for Editorial Writing
2001	David Levering Lewis	Pulitzer Prize for Biography or Autobiography
2013	Bret Stephens	Pulitzer Prize for Commentary

== Business and finance ==
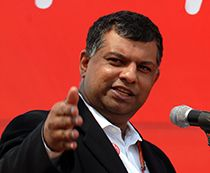
Tony Fernandes, Malaysian entrepreneur, CEO of AirAsia

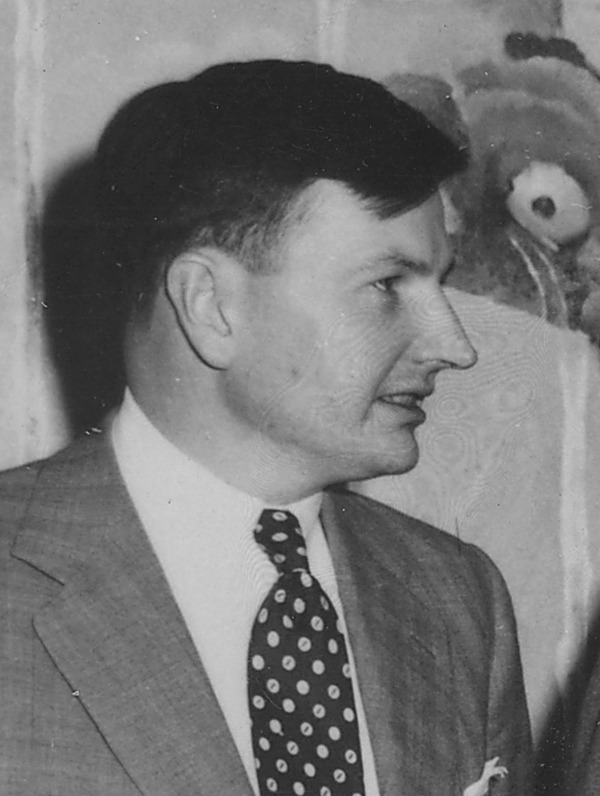
David Rockefeller, former chairman, Chase Manhattan Bank

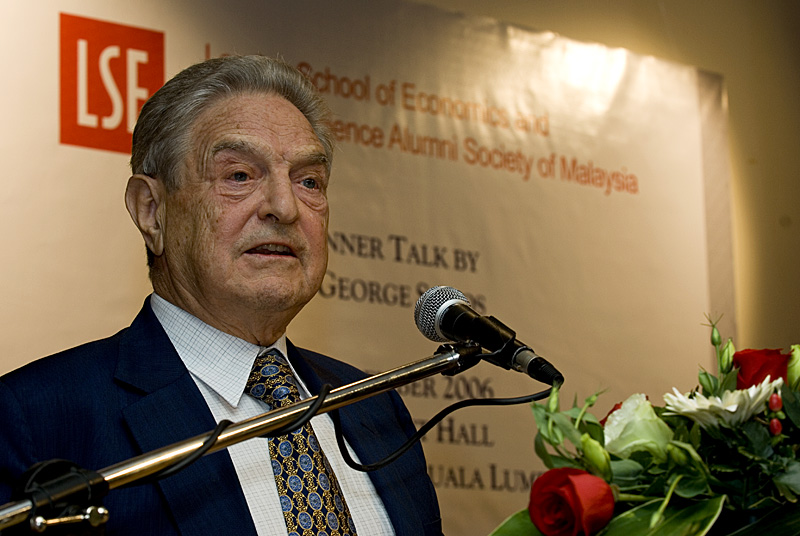
George Soros, billionaire

- Josef Ackermann (born 1948), former CEO of Deutsche Bank (visiting professor)
- Aigboje Aig-Imoukhuede, banker, co-founder of Access Bank Plc; founder and chairman of Africa Initiative for Governance
- Ameer Ali, economist, President of the Australian Federation of Islamic Councils
- Marco Alverà, CEO of Snam
- Delphine Arnault, billionaire French businesswoman
- Sir Terence Beckett, chairman of Ford and director-general of the Confederation of British Industry
- Geoffrey Bell, banker, Group of Thirty founder
- Karan Bhatia, head of Global Public Policy at Alphabet Inc. (formerly Google)
- Alan Blinder, chief economist of the Council of Economic Advisors under Bill Clinton; economic advisor to John Kerry; vice-chairman of the Federal Reserve Board of Governors; professor of economics, Princeton University
- Sir Gordon Brunton, chief executive of Thomson Corporation, former chairman of Sotheby's
- Richard Caruso, founder and chairman of Integra LifeSciences Corporation; 2006 Ernst & Young US Entrepreneur of the Year
- Glyn England, chairman of the Central Electricity Generating Board
- Tony Fernandes, entrepreneur
- Clara Furse, former chief executive of the London Stock Exchange
- Sir Stelios Haji-Ioannou, entrepreneur, founder of EasyGroup
- Michael S. Jeffries, CEO of Abercrombie & Fitch Co.
- Jonathan Kestenbaum, Baron Kestenbaum (born 1959), chief operating officer of investment trust RIT Capital Partners plc, and a Labour member of the House of Lords
- Spiro Latsis, billionaire
- Charles Lee, former chairman of the Hong Kong Stock Exchange
- Catherine Maxwell Stuart, 21st Lady of Traquair, brewer, hotelier, and estate owner
- David Morgan, CEO of Westpac
- Erling Dekke Næss, Norwegian shipowner and businessman
- Arif Naqvi, CEO of The Abraaj Group, a private equity firm
- Richard Nesbitt, CEO, TSX Group; Toronto Stock Exchange
- Jorma Ollila, chairman of Nokia Corporation, non-executive chairman of Royal Dutch Shell
- Zarin Patel, BBC's chief financial officer
- Gary Perlin, CFO of Capital One Financial Corporation; former CFO World Bank
- Avinash Persaud, global head of currency & commodity research at J.P. Morgan
- Ruth Porat, Chief Financial Officer, Alphabet Inc (formerly Google); former chief financial officer, Morgan Stanley
- Vicky Pryce, former joint head of the UK Government Economic Service
- Philip J. Purcell, former CEO Morgan Stanley Dean Witter
- Syed Ali Raza, president and chairman of the National Bank of Pakistan
- David Rockefeller, former chairman, Chase Manhattan Bank; chairman/honorary chairman, the Council on Foreign Relations; chairman/honorary chairman, the Trilateral Commission, son of financer John D. Rockefeller Jr. and grandson of Standard Oil co-founder John D. Rockefeller
- Maurice Saatchi, Baron Saatchi, founder of Saatchi and Saatchi
- Allen Sheppard, Baron Sheppard of Didgemere, industrialist, Chancellor of Middlesex University
- George Soros, financier; billionaire
- Peter Sutherland, BP and Goldman Sachs chairman

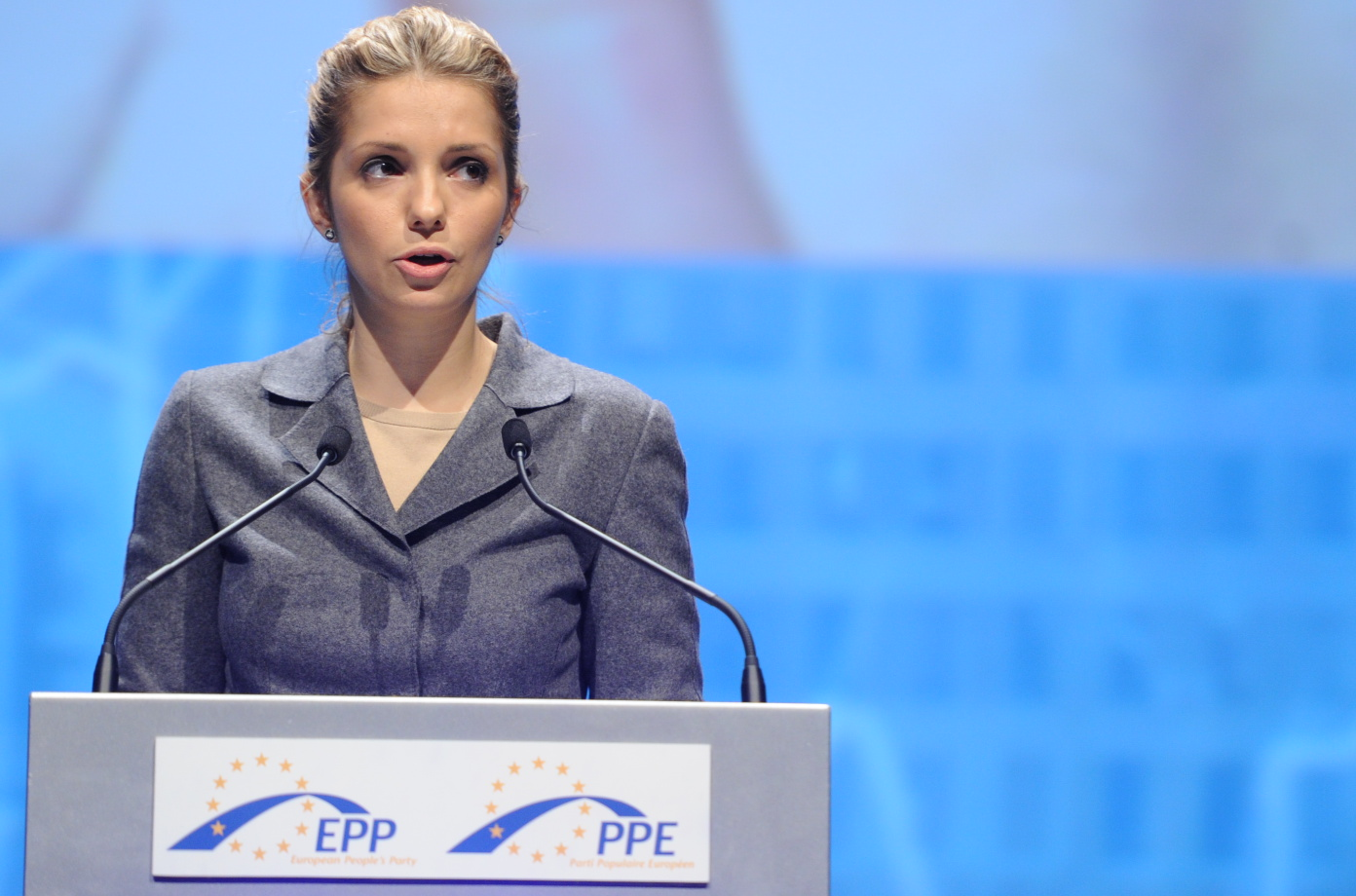
Yevhenia Tymoshenko, Ukrainian entrepreneur

- Sheikha Alanoud bint Hamad Al Thani, finance executive at the Qatar Financial Centre
- Gordon Thiessen, governor of the Bank of Canada, 1994–2001
- Yevhenia Tymoshenko, Ukrainian entrepreneur and lobbyist on behalf of her mother, former prime minister of Ukraine Yulia Tymoshenko
- Lance Uggla, CEO of Markit Group
- Panagis Vourloumis, managing director and President of the OTE's Board, the national telecommunications provider of Greece
- Arnold Weinstock, Baron Weinstock, English businessman best known for building GEC
- Jim Whitehurst, CEO of Red Hat
- Jeff Wooller, accountant and educationalist
- Rebekah Yeoh, Malaysian businesswoman and philanthropist

== Law enforcement ==
- Sir Ian Johnston, Chief Constable of British Transport Police
- Valerie Plame, CIA officer who was controversially identified in a newspaper column by Robert Novak in July 2003
- Barbara Wilding, Chief Constable of South Wales Police

== Lawyers and judges ==
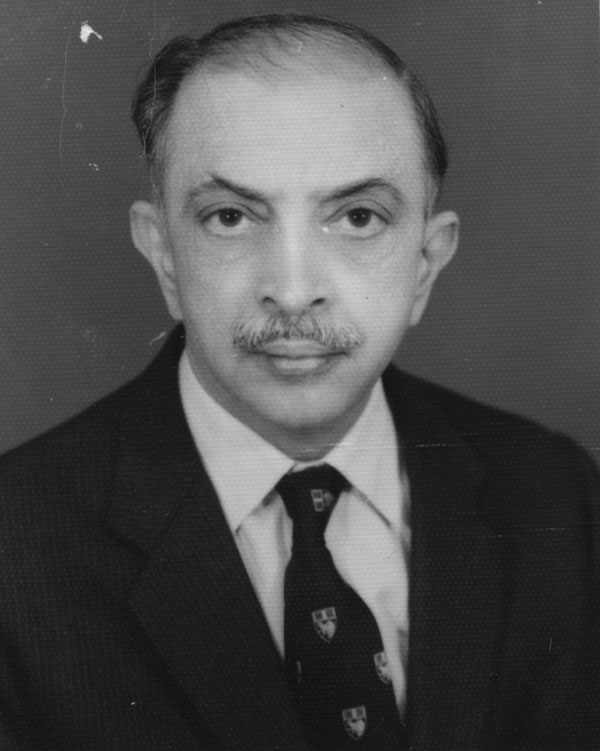
Dorab Patel, Justice of the Supreme Court of Pakistan

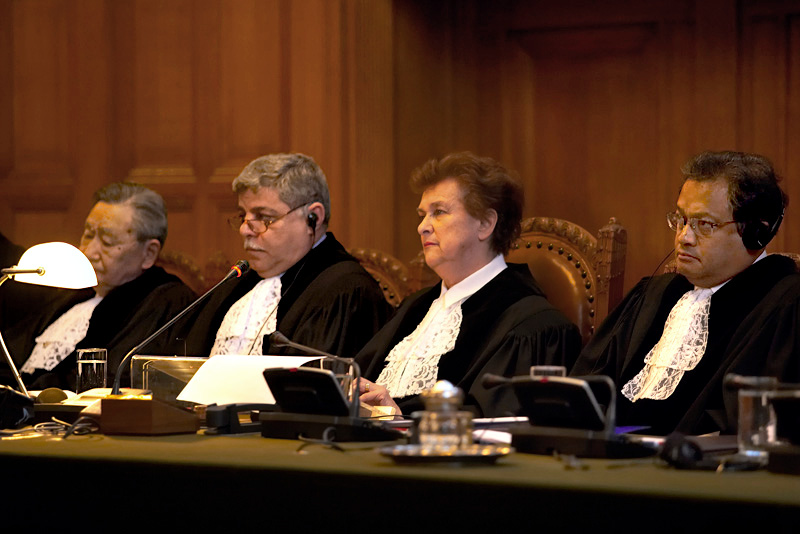
Rosalyn Higgins, President of the International Court of Justice, 2006–2009

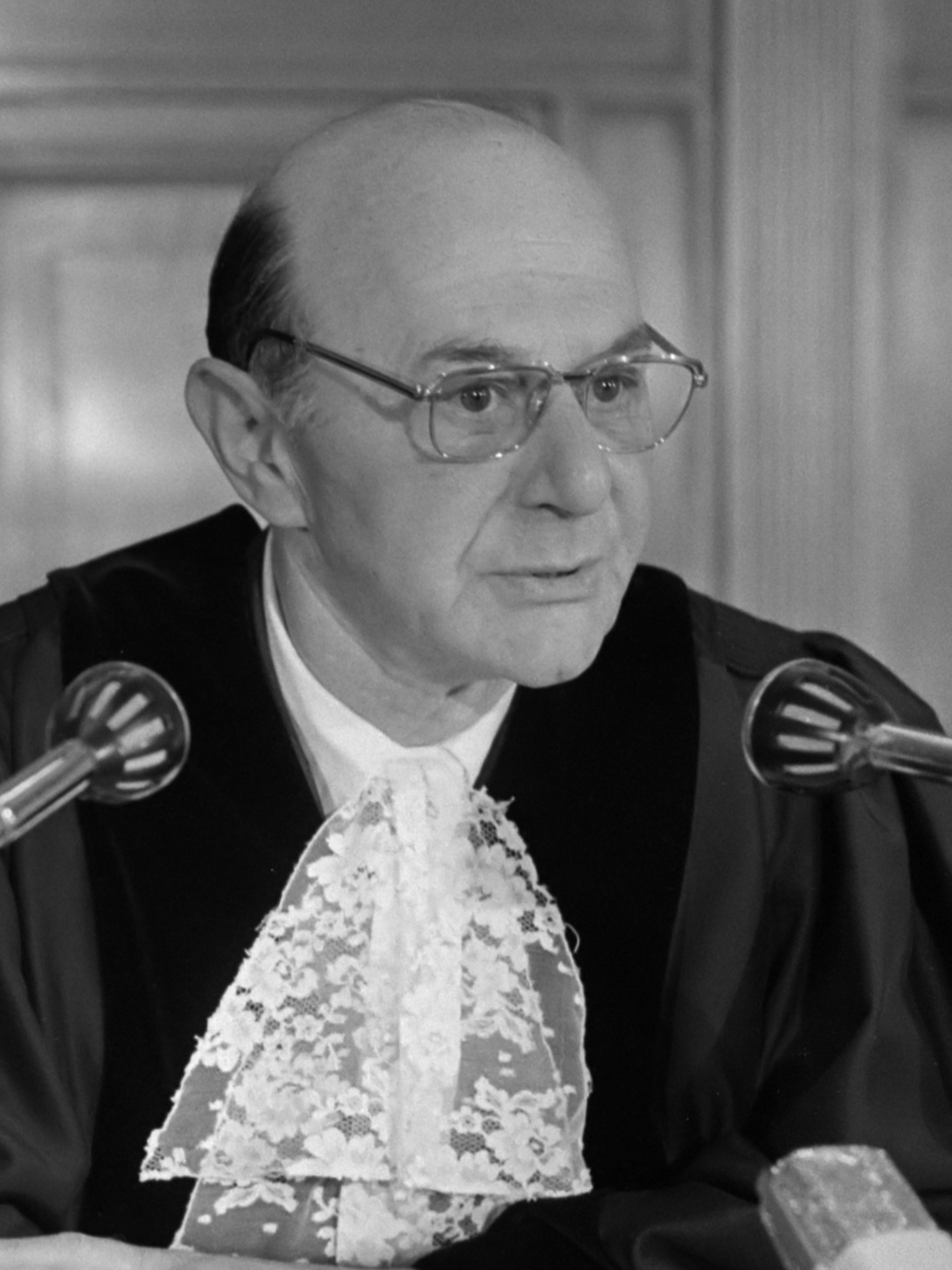
Manfred Lachs, Judge of the International Court of Justice, 1967–1993

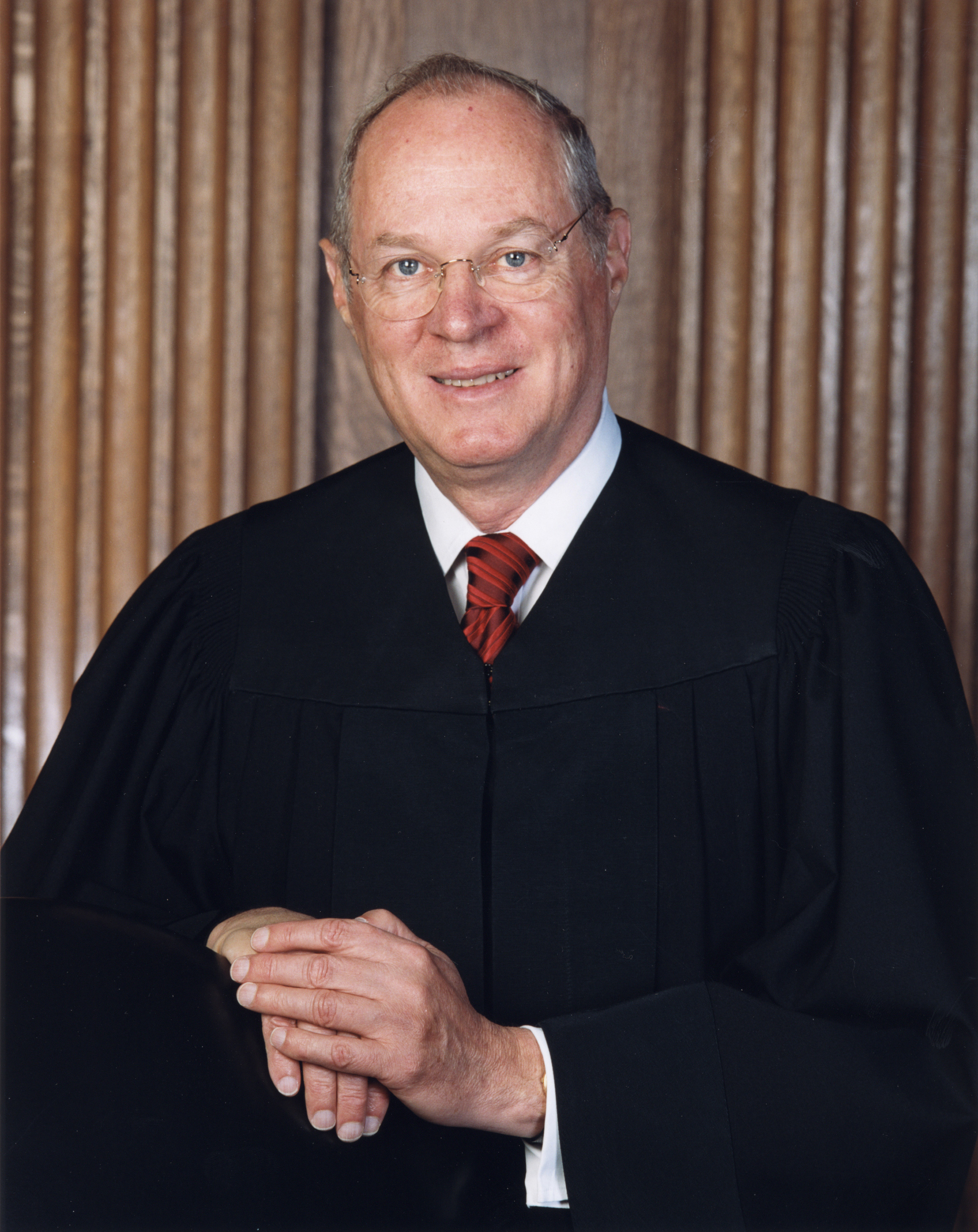
Anthony Kennedy, Justice of the Supreme Court of the United States, 1988–2018

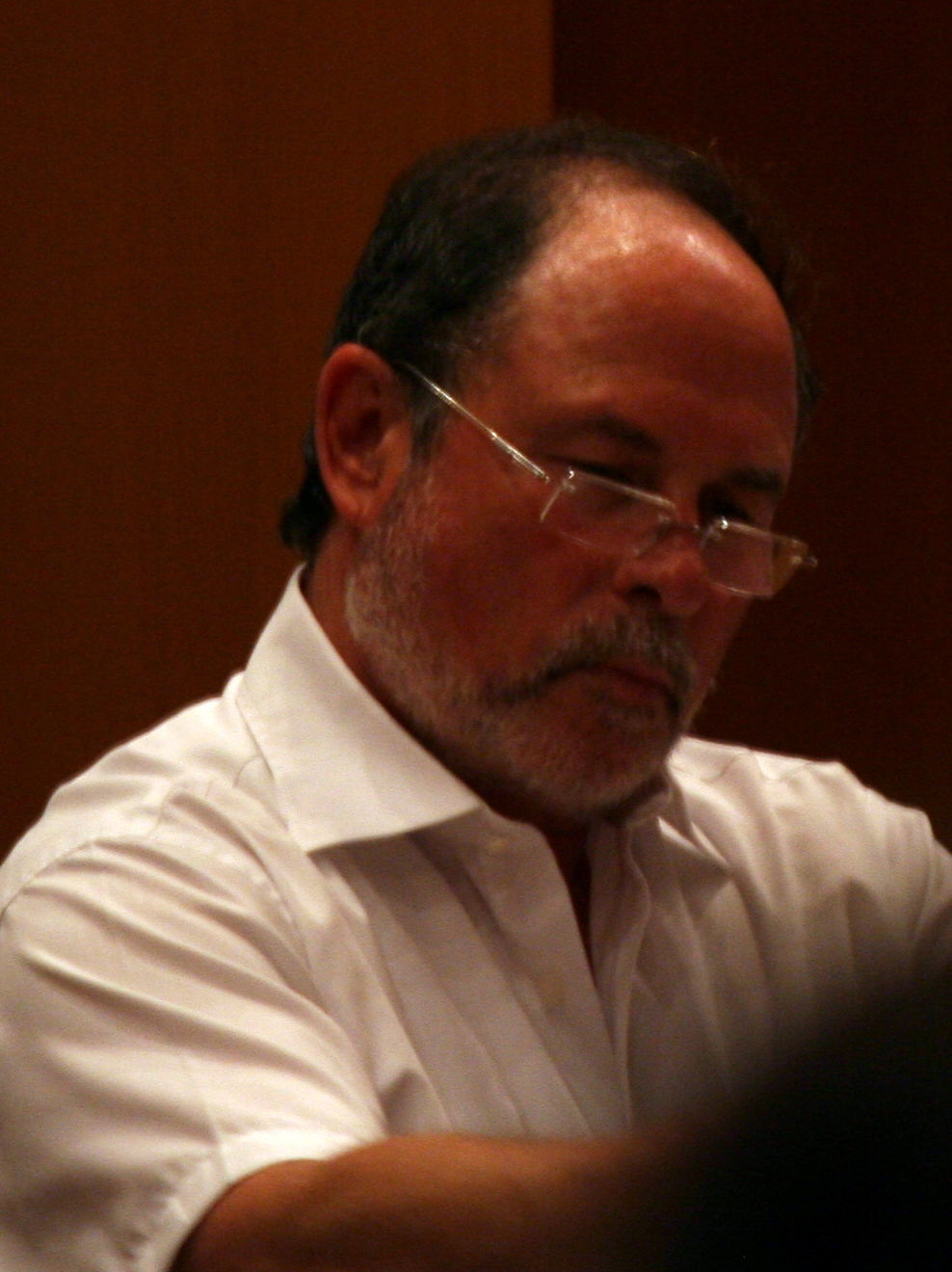
Yoram Danziger, Justice of the Supreme Court of Israel, 2007–present
- Salahuddin Ahmad, former attorney general of Bangladesh
- Kweku Etrew Amua-Sekyi, Justice of the Supreme Court of Ghana and Justice of the Supreme Court of the Gambia
- Cherie Blair KC, judge, wife of former British prime minister Tony Blair
- Gerald Butler, senior judge at Southwark Crown Court
- Colm Connolly, Judge of the United States District Court for the District of Delaware
- Yoram Danziger, Justice of the Supreme Court of Israel
- Dame Linda Dobbs, first non-white person to be appointed a judge of the High Court of Justice of England and Wales
- Courtenay Griffiths, KC
- Curtis Doebbler, lawyer, represented Saddam Hussein
- Sir Richard Field, High Court Judge
- Sir Morris Finer, barrister, judge, Chairman of the Finer Report on One Parent Families & the Royal Commission on the Press, Vice Chairman of governors of LSE
- Sir Michael Fox, Lord Justice of Appeal
- Dame Janet Gaymer KC, Civil Service Commissioner and Commissioner for Public Appointments
- Anthony Grabiner, Baron Grabiner, Deputy High Court Judge
- Sir Christopher Greenwood KC, advised Tony Blair and the Bush Administration on the legality of the Iraq War, member of the International Court of Justice
- James Hamilton, participated in the United States Senate Watergate Committee
- Bill Hastings, Chief Censor of New Zealand
- Dame Rosalyn Higgins KC, judge and former president of the International Court of Justice
- Derry Irvine KC, Baron Irvine of Lairg, Scottish lawyer and judge, former lord high chancellor of Great Britain, founder of the 11 King's Bench Walk Chambers
- Sir Robin Jacob, as Lord Justice Jacob a Lord Justice of Appeal in the Court of Appeal of England and Wales
- Sir Edwin Jowitt, High Court judge
- Mustafa Kamal, former chief justice of Bangladesh
- Anthony Kennedy, U.S. Supreme Court, associate justice
- Makhdoom Ali Khan, former attorney general of Pakistan
- Manfred Lachs, judge on the International Court of Justice
- Lauretta Lamptey, Ghanaian Commissioner on Human Rights and Administrative Justice
- Sir Hersch Lauterpacht, judge of the International Court of Justice
- D. Price Marshall Jr., judge of the United States District Court for the Eastern District of Arkansas
- Jeremy McMullen, KC, judge at the High Court, the Employment Appeal Tribunal and Southwark Crown Court
- Thomas Mesereau, lawyer, represented Michael Jackson
- Betty Mould-Iddrisu, former attorney general of Ghana
- Dorab Patel, Justice of the Supreme Court of Pakistan
- Gareth Peirce, solicitor, represented the Guildford Four
- Robert Ribeiro, Permanent Justice of the Hong Kong Court of Final Appeal
- Walter Tarnopolsky, Canadian judge and member of United Nations Human Rights Committee
- Cedric Thornberry, International lawyer and former assistant-secretary-general of the United Nations
- Mónica Feria Tinta, international lawyer, obtained the first international human rights court decision ordering the prosecution of a former head of state for crimes under international law; co-recipient of Gruber Justice Prize 2007
- Peter Whiteman, Deputy High Court Judge
- Kimba Wood, federal judge on senior status for the United States District Court for the Southern District of New York
- John A. Woodcock Jr., judge of the United States District Court for the District of Maine

== NGOs, charities and pressure groups ==
- Alagappa Alagappan (1925–2014), Indian-born American founder of the Hindu Temple Society of North America
- Shami Chakrabarti, director of Liberty
- Barbara Davies, former national organizer of Christian CND
- Ibijoke Faborode, co-founder and CEO of Nigerian nonprofit ElectHER
- Mark Goldring, chief executive of Mencap, chief executive of Oxfam GB
- Dame Elisabeth Hoodless, executive director of Community Service Volunteers (1975–2011)
- Mary Joynson, director of Barnardo's
- Marion Kozak, human rights campaigner
- Temi Mwale, founder of the 4Front Project
- Sir Nicholas Partridge, chief executive Terrence Higgins Trust; chairman of Involve
- Anusyabehn Sarabhai, Indian trade unionist
- Salil Shetty, Secretary General of Amnesty International

== Sport ==
- Josh Chetwynd, baseball player, presenter and author
- John Lacy, English footballer, 1975 FA Cup finalist with Fulham
- Marcus Mepstead, men's foil team, Rio 2016 Olympics
- Folarin Ogunsola, Gambian national swimmer
- Elham Al Qasimi, first Arab woman to reach the North Pole
- Andy Ripley, British Lions Rugby International
- Val Venis, wrestler

== Others ==
- Rachel Barrett, Welsh suffragette and newspaper editor
- Jonathan Bartley, former co-leader of the Green Party of England and Wales
- Ian Black, journalist and author
- Arnold Cook, founder of the Guide Dog movement
- William Crampton, vexillologist, founder of the Flag Institute in the UK
- Joseph P. Kennedy Jr., American naval officer and brother of US president John F. Kennedy, died in WWII
- Penelope Meredith Mary Knatchbull, Countess Mountbatten of Burma
- Ralph Lazar, artist
- Ilich Ramírez Sánchez aka Carlos the Jackal, terrorist
- Ahmed Omar Saeed Sheikh, Islamic militant
- Isabelle Trowler, social worker

== Fictional ==
- President Josiah Bartlet, fictional president of the United States on NBC's popular TV show The West Wing
- Eliza Doolittle, fictional character in Pygmalion by George Bernard Shaw
- Prime Minister Jim Hacker of Yes Minister and Yes, Prime Minister
- Guy MacKendrick, a British accounts executive in Mad Men
- Jack Ryan, fictional character by Tom Clancy who appears in many of his novels and their respective film adaptations
- Charles Umtali, President of Buranda as Selim Mohammed in Yes Minister (Season 1, Episode 2: "The Official Visit")

== Founders of LSE ==
First the four generally accepted co-founders:

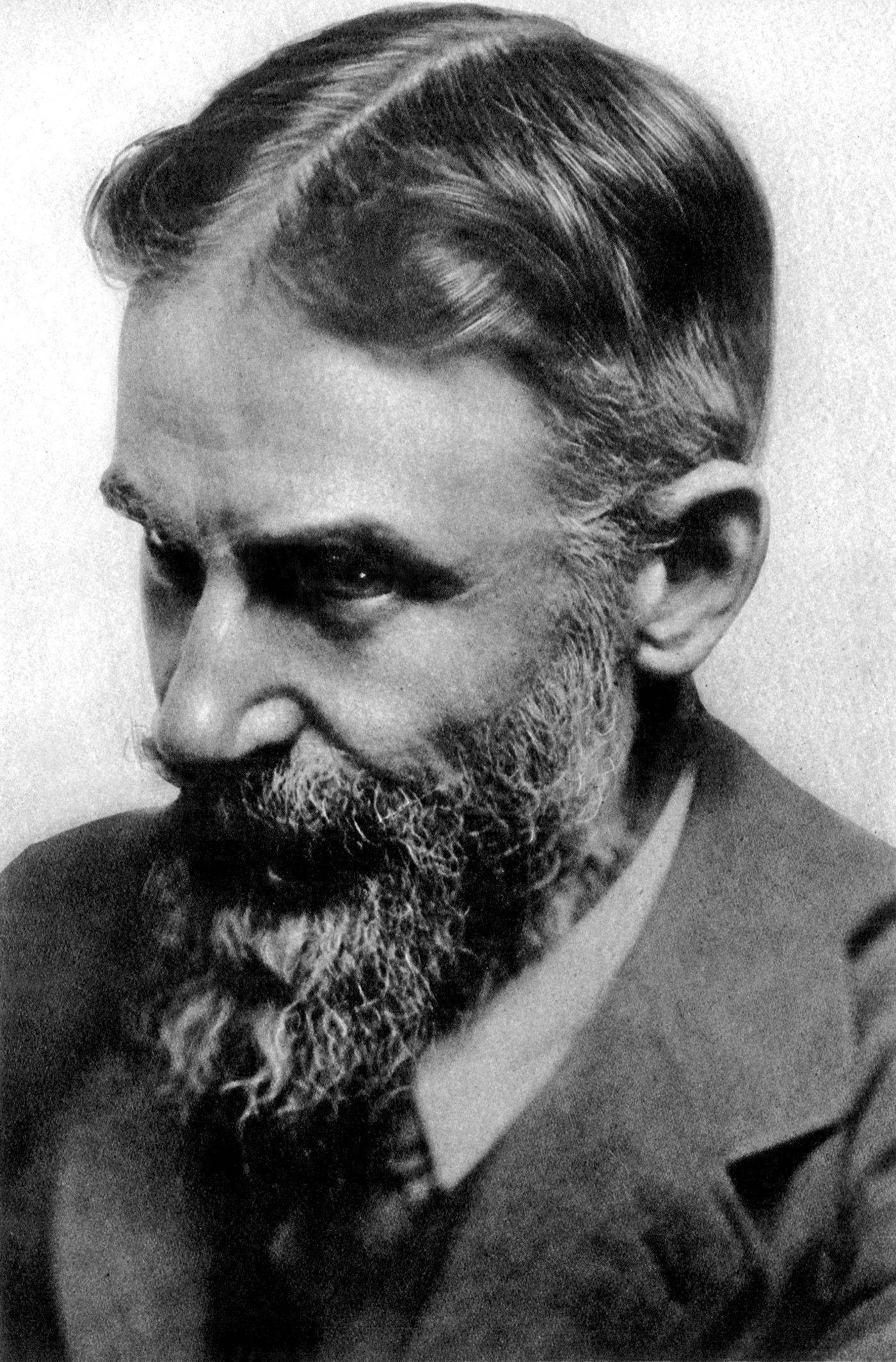
George Bernard Shaw, one of the founders of the LSE and Nobel laureate

- Sidney Webb
- George Bernard Shaw
- Beatrice Webb, also governor, LSE 1901-1928
- Graham Wallas

The original governors of the LSE were, besides Beatrice Webb:

- Jervoise Athelstane Baines, governor, LSE, 1901-1926
- Hubert Bland, governor, LSE, 1901-1914
- William Garnett, mathematical physicist and educational administrator, governor, LSE, 1901-1932
- Robert Giffen, governor, LSE, 1901-1910
- Courtenay Ilbert, governor, LSE, 1901-1923
- Richard Burdon Haldane, Liberal politician, lawyer, and philosopher, governor, LSE, 1901-1907
- Alfred Lyall, governor, LSE, 1901-1911
- Joseph Francis Oakeshott, governor, LSE, 1901-1945
- Edward R. Pease, governor, LSE, 1901-1945
- William Pember Reeves, governor, LSE, 1901-1908
- Lionel Walter Rothschild, governor, LSE, 1901-1929
- Bertrand Russell, governor, LSE, 1901-1906
- Herbert L Samuel, governor, LSE, 1901-1945
- Charlotte Shaw, governor, LSE, 1901-1922
- Frederick Whelan, governor, LSE, 1901-1945
- Edward Arthur Whittuck, governor, LSE, 1901-1924
