= Governor of the Central Bank of Sri Lanka =

Governor of Central Bank of Sri Lanka
- Incumbent; P. Nandalal Weerasinghe since 7 April 2022
- Member of: Monetary Board of Central Bank of Sri Lanka
- Residence: Bank House, Colombo
- Appointer: President of Sri Lanka
- Term length: 6 Years
- Formation: 28 August 1950; 76 years ago
- First holder: John Exter
- Website: Governors of the Central Bank of Sri Lanka

The Governor of the Central Bank of Sri Lanka (CBSL) functions as the chief executive of the Sri Lankan central bank. The post is the ex-officio chairperson of the Monetary Board of Central Bank of Sri Lanka. Since its establishment in 1950, the CBSL has been headed by sixteen governors. The governor has two deputies and several assistant governors. The inaugural officeholder was the American John Exter who served the Government of Sri Lanka in helping found the central bank. The position is currently held by Nandalal Weerasinghe who was appointed to the office on 8 April 2022.

== Procedure for appointment ==
The Monetary Law Act, amended for the last time in 2014, indicated "The Governor of the Central Bank shall be appointed by the President on the recommendation of the Minister in charge of the subject of Finance". This was in effect during the 2015 appointment of Governor Arjuna Mahendran that preceded the Central Bank of Sri Lanka bond scandal.

In 2022, the Twenty-first Amendment to the Constitution expanded the scope of the Constitutional Council and required their approval for nominees for Governor of the Central Bank. Thereafter, in 2023, the Central Bank of Sri Lanka Act replaced the Monetary Law Act and stipulated a specific new procedure for appointing Governors. The Minister of Finance must still recommend nominees for Governor, but both the President and the Constitutional Council are allowed to reject nominees.

== Privileges ==
The term of office lasts for six years and includes several privileges in form of allowances. This includes use of the Bank House as the official residence, transport and security provided by the CBSL. The governor is entitled to a pension. In the order of precedence, the governor is equivalent to a cabinet minister.

== List of governors of the Central Bank ==
#	Governor	Took office	Left office	Appointed by
1	John Exter	28 August 1950	30 June 1953	D. S. Senanayake
2	N. U. Jayawardena	1 July 1953	13 October 1954	Dudley Senanayake
3	Arthur Ranasinghe	14 October 1954	30 June 1959	John Kotelawala
4	Don William Rajapatirana	1 July 1959	30 August 1967	S. W. R. D. Bandaranaike
5	William Tennekoon	31 August 1967	31 May 1971	Dudley Senanayake
6	Herbert Tennekoon	1 July 1971	22 January 1979	Sirimavo Bandaranaike
7	Warnasena Rasaputra	15 February 1979	18 November 1988	J. R. Jayewardene
8	Neville Karunatilake	19 November 1988	30 June 1992	J. R. Jayewardene
9	Heen Banda Dissanayaka	1 July 1992	14 November 1995	Ranasinghe Premadasa
10	Amarananda Jayawardena	15 November 1995	30 June 2004	Chandrika Kumaratunga
11	Sunil Mendis	1 July 2004	30 June 2006	Chandrika Kumaratunga
12	Ajith Nivard Cabraal	1 July 2006	9 January 2015	Mahinda Rajapaksa
13	Arjuna Mahendran	26 January 2015	30 June 2016	Maithripala Sirisena
14	Indrajit Coomaraswamy	2 July 2016	20 December 2019	Maithripala Sirisena
15	W. D. Lakshman	24 December 2019	14 September 2021	Gotabaya Rajapaksa
16	Ajith Nivard Cabraal	15 September 2021	4 April 2022	Gotabaya Rajapaksa
17	Nandalal Weerasinghe	8 April 2022	present	Gotabaya Rajapaksa
