= Sunil Mendis =

Governor of the Central Bank of Sri Lanka
- In office 4 July 2004 – 30 June 2006
- Preceded by: Amarananda Jayawardena
- Succeeded by: Ajith Nivard Cabraal

Personal details
- Spouse: Manthri nee Pandithage
- Education: St. Servatius' College; Royal College, Colombo
- Occupation: accountant, banker

Sunil Mendis is a Sri Lankan corporate executive. He was the eleventh governor of the Central Bank of Sri Lanka and a former chairman of the Hayley's Group of Companies.

Educated at the St. Servatius' College, Matara and Royal College, Colombo, Sunil Mendis was a member of the Association of Chartered Certified Accountants. Joining Hayleys, one of Sri Lanka's oldest and largest conglomerates, he went on to become its chairman and chief executive officer after having served there for 42 years. Prior to his appointment, he was a committee member of the Ceylon Chamber of Commerce and was a director of the Bank of Ceylon for many years. His other positions include being a Director of the Private Sector Infrastructure Development Company, the United States Educational Foundation in Sri Lanka as well as being a director of Export Development Board and the Board of Investment and on the Presidential Salaries Commission.

After retiring as chairman of Hayleys Mendis was appointed as Governor of the Central Bank on 1 July 2004.

During the period 2004-2005, Mendis served as the director of National Council for Economic Development at the Institute of Policy Studies (IPS) and served as the chairman of the Sovereign Rating Committee for the Government of Sri Lanka. He was awarded the title of Deshamanya in 2005 by the Sri Lankan Government. During the same year, he also attended the opening of the Hatton National Bank's museum and decided to change interest rates despite last year's tsunami disaster.

He has been on the board of over 100 state and private sector institutions in Sri Lanka as well as 7 companies internationally. He retired from the position of Governor on 30 June 2006, only two years into a six year term, following the election of President Mahinda Rajapaksa. Mendis then took on a role as a Director of Cargills PLC.
