= Warnasena Rasaputra =

Dr Warnasena Rasaputra

Governor of the Central Bank of Sri Lanka
- In office 15 February 1979 – 18 November 1988
- Preceded by: Herbert E. Tennekoon
- Succeeded by: Neville Karunatilake

Personal details
- Born: Warnasena Rasaputram; 6 September 1927 Matara, Ceylon
- Died: 25 June 2003 (aged 75) Colombo, Sri Lanka
- Spouse(s): Jayanthi Sriya; Seeta Gopalan
- Children: Jaliya Gajaba
- Education: St. Servatius' College; Ananda College; University of Ceylon; University of Wisconsin
- Profession: Economist

Dr Warnasena Rasaputra (6 September 1927 – 25 June 2003) was a Sri Lankan economist and the seventh Governor of the Central Bank of Sri Lanka.

== Biography ==
Warnasena Rasaputra was born on 6 September 1927 in the village of Yatiyana, near Matara, Sri Lanka, the son of Don Nicholas and Jane née Ratnayake. He was educated at St. Servatius' College, Matara and Ananda College, Colombo.

After graduating from the University of Ceylon with a degree in economics with honours, specialising in statistics, Rasaputra joined the Central Bank of Sri Lanka in 1951. In the late 1950s, he was successful in obtaining a Smith-Mundt Scholarship offered by the Institute of International Education and the United States Educational Foundation, and subsequently a Fulbright grant. He attended the University of Wisconsin, where in 1957 he obtained a master's degree in statistics and then doctor of philosophy in economics in 1959. He returned to the Central Bank and in 1968 was appointed director of economic research. In 1974 Rasaputra was appointed assistant to the governor and then deputy governor in 1975.

On 15 February 1979, Rasaputra became the seventh governor of the Central Bank of Sri Lanka, a position that he held for almost nine years. He assisted in guiding the country from a closed economy to an open market orientation. He also promoted the decentralisation of the Central Bank, setting up regional branches in Matara, Anuradhapura and Matale, and was also instrumental in establishing the Regional Development Banks.

In November 1988 he resigned from his post as governor and was appointed the Sri Lankan ambassador to France. He subsequently served as Sri Lanka high commissioner to Malaysia and the permanent representative to the UN offices in Geneva and Vienna and also ambassador to the Vatican. His last posting was as ambassador to the United States. He resigned from this position in 2001 due to serious heart condition.

== Personal life ==
Rasaputra married Jayanthi Sriya, with whom he had one child, Jaliya Gajaba. Following Jayanthi's death he remarried Seetha Gopalan on 28 October 1977.

== See also ==
- Governor of the Central Bank of Sri Lanka
- Sri Lankan Non Career Diplomats
