= N. U. Jayawardena =

Sri Lankan economist and former Governor of the Central Bank of Sri Lanka

Deshamanya Neville Ubeysingha Jayawardena (commonly known as N. U. Jayawardena) (1908–2002) was a Sri Lankan Senator, economist, banker and entrepreneur. He was the first Ceylonese Governor of the Central Bank of Ceylon and founder of the Mercantile Group of Companies that formed the Merc Bank Sri Lanka, Sampath Bank and the former Mercantile Credit Ltd. He was educated at St. Servatius' College, Matara.

== Early life and education ==
N. U. Jayawardena was born in the backwaters of Hambantota, where his father was the local rest housekeeper. He was the eldest out of three sons and also had five sisters. During his childhood he was fed with kurakkan pittu, buffalo milk and curds. He attended St. Mary's School in Hambantota from 1913 to 1915 and from 1915 to 1920 studied at the St. Servatius' College, Matara. Thereafter, he completed his secondary education at St. Aloysius' College, Galle and then got his BSc in Economics from the Westfield College. In 1931, he obtained an external degree from the University of London, prior to which he passed a Clerical Services Examination in 1925. In 1938, he took a course in Business Administration at the London School of Economics.

== Career ==
On his return to Ceylon, he took up his first job as a clerk (class 2) in the government service, which was uncommon for a graduate. In 1934 he moved to the Banking Commission and by 1941, briefly worked as a lecturer at the Ceylon University College. During World War II, he moved to the Department of Commodity Purchase and became the Controller of Exchange by 1948 and a year later was promoted to the Controller of Imports and Exports. Thereafter he worked closely with John Exter, the American economist, in establishing the Central Bank of Ceylon in 1950 with Exter as its first Governor and Jayawardena as Deputy Governor. When Exter left in 1953, Jayawardena succeed him as the first Ceylonese Governor, holding the post till 1954 when he was interdicted.

However he was appointed first Ceylonese Joint-Managing Director of a British-owned firm, Vavasseur & Company and was exonerated in public service in 1957. Following his exoneration he was appointed to the Senate of Ceylon. Moving into the private sector, he founded the Mercantile Group of Companies that included the Merc Bank Sri Lank, Sampath Bank, the former Mercantile Credit Ltd, National Enterprise Bank (DFCC Vardhana Bank), Mercantile Shipping and Mercantile Leasing.

He served in many commissions and was awarded the title Deshamanya in 1991 by the government of Sri Lanka for his contributions to the nation.

== Personal life ==
Jayawardena was married to Amybelle Millicent Jayawardena and they had two sons Dr Lal Jayewardene who was a Sri Lankan High Commissioner to the UK and a Presidential Economic Adviser; A. N. U. Jayawardena and one daughter Yasodha Neiliya Jayawardena who married Chris Pinto a Sri Lankan diplomat. His grandson Milinda Moragoda is a former Minister and Senior Adviser to the President. His daughter-in-law is Kumari Jayawardena and his granddaughter-in-law is Jennifer Moragoda, both of which were the authors of his biography N.U. Jayawardena - The First Five Decades. His home Cambridge Place, Colombo was designed in 1960 by the Danish architect, Ulrik Plesner.

On November 6, 2010, the road near which N. U. Jayawardena had lived his whole life was renamed to Deshamanya N.U. Jayawardena Mawatha in his honor.
