= Arthur Ranasinghe =

Civil Servant

Sir Arthur Ranasinha CMG, CBE, CCS
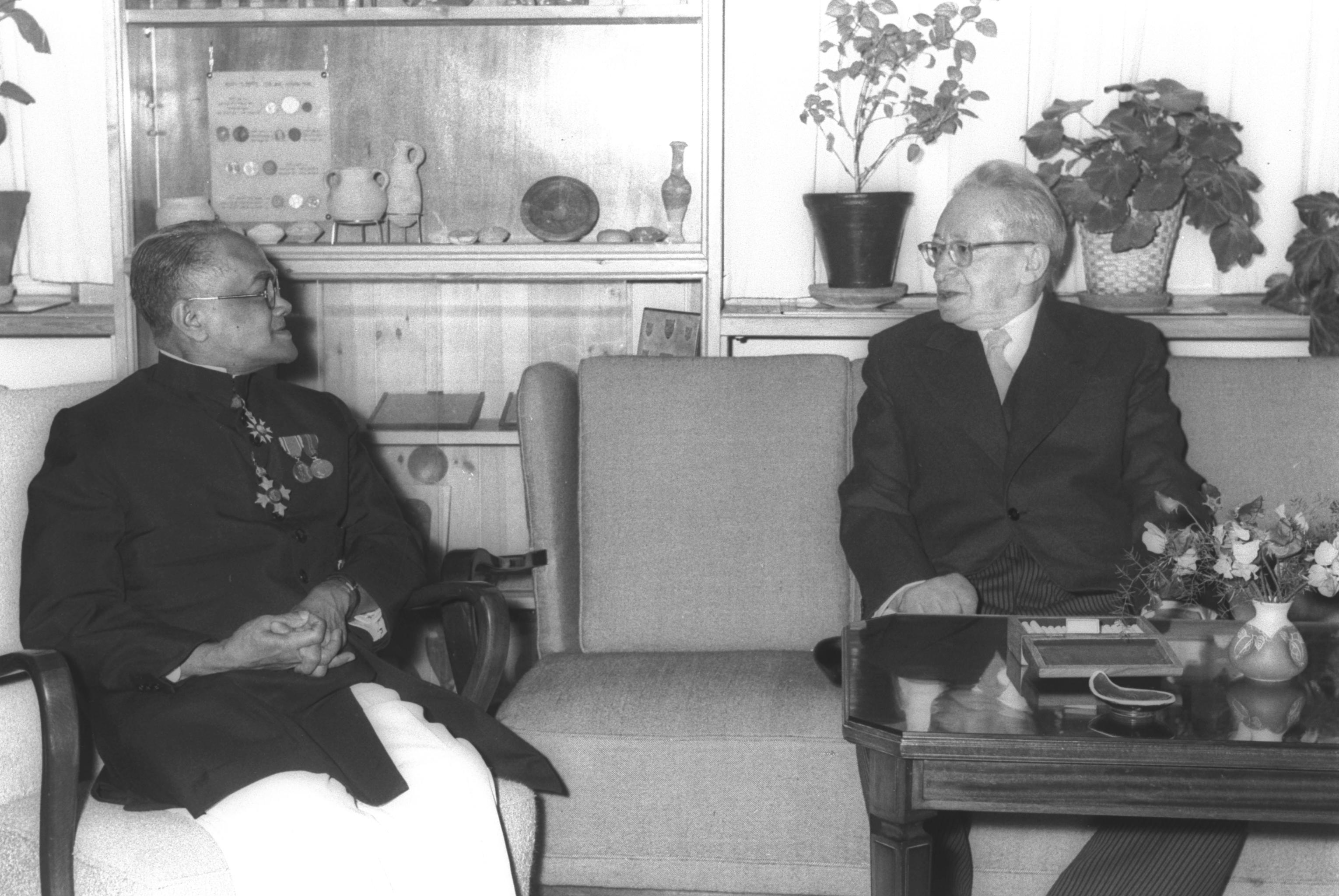
- Ranasinghe (left) meeting Yitzhak Ben-Zvi in 1959

Secretary to the Treasury

Personal details
- Born: 24 June 1898 Colombo, Sri Lanka
- Died: 19 June 1976 (aged 77) Colombo, Sri Lanka

Sir Arthur Godwin Ranasinha, CMG, CBE, CCS (24 June 1898 – 19 June 1976) was a Sri Lankan civil servant and statesmen. A career civil servant in the Ceylon Civil Service, he served as Secretary to the Treasury, Cabinet Secretary and Governor of the Central Bank of Ceylon before apportionment as a Cabinet Minister and Senator. He had also served as Ceylon's Ambassador to Italy.

== Education ==
Ranasinghe was educated at S. Thomas' College, Mount Lavinia and Trinity Hall, Cambridge. He was a Ceylon University Scholar in 1917 and gained Bachelor of Arts degree in history from the University of London.

== Civil service ==
He was appointed to the Ceylon Civil Service as a Cadet in January 1921 by the Secretary of State for the Colonies in London having been placed seventh in the Indian Civil Service admission exam in 1920. On his return to the island, he was attached to the Kegalle kachcheri and was attached to the Jaffna kachcheri in 1922 and was appointed Police Magistrate of Point Pedro in 1923. Promoted to Class 4 officer, he served as a Police Magistrate in Balapitiya and Jaffna. In 1928, he was Promoted to Class 3 officer and served as District Judge in Avissawella and Badulla. Promoted to Class 2 officer, he served as Additional Assistant Government Agent of Colombo before being appointed as Secretary to the Minister for Agriculture and Lands from 1933 to 1936 when he was appointed Public Trustee. During World War II he served as Custodian of enemy property. In 1944, he was promoted to class 1 officer and appointed Superintendent of Census and in 1945 he served as Secretary to the D. S. Senanayake, Leader of the State Council of Ceylon on his mission to London to discuss the report by the Soulbury Commission with the Secretary of State for the Colonies and negotiate for self-rule in Ceylon. He also served as acting Commissioner of Lands. In 1947, he was appointed Permanent Secretary to the Ministry of Agriculture and Lands and acting Superintendent of Census. In 1950 he was appointed Cabinet Secretary and Deputy Secretary to the Treasury. In 1951, he was appointed Permanent Secretary to the Ministry of Finance, Secretary to the Treasury and Secretary to the Cabinet, serving till 1954. He also served as Secretary to the Cabinet Planning Committee and Chief Planning Commissioner from 1953 to 1954. In 1954, he was appointed Governor of the Central Bank which he held until 1959.

He served as Ceylon's Ambassador to Italy and Greece from 1959 to 1961, with concurrent accreditation as Ceylon's Permanent Representative to Food and Agriculture Organization (FAO).

== Honors ==
He was appointed a Commander of the Most Excellent Order of the British Empire (CBE) in the 1948 New Year Honours, a Companion of the Order of St Michael and St George (CMG) in 1949 Birthday Honours and was knighted in the 1954 New Year Honours as a Knight Bachelor. He was awarded the King George VI Coronation Medal in 1937 and the Queen Elizabeth II Coronation Medal in 1953.

== See also ==
- List of Sri Lankan non-career diplomats
