= Nandalal Weerasinghe =

Sri Lankan banker and current Governor of the Central Bank of Sri Lanka

Puwakdandawe Nandalal Weerasinghe
- පුවක්දණ්ඩාවේ නන්දලාල් වීරසිංහ

Governor of the Central Bank of Sri Lanka
- Incumbent
- Assumed office 7 April 2022
- Preceded by: Ajith Nivard Cabraal

Personal details
- Born: Dickwella, Matara
- Education: Rahula College, Matara; Ananda College, Colombo
- Alma mater: University of Kelaniya; Australian National University
- Profession: Economist, Banker, Central Banker, Researcher

Puwakdandawe Nandalal Weerasinghe is a Sri Lankan economist and banker who is also currently serving as the 17th governor of the Central Bank of Sri Lanka. A career officer in the Central Bank of Sri Lanka, serving as its chief economist and senior deputy governor. He has also served as an alternative executive director at the International Monetary Fund in Washington DC representing the countries such as Sri Lanka, Bhutan, India and Bangladesh from January 2010 to August 2012. He has also previously acted as a chairman of the monetary policy committee and foreign reserve management committee of the Central Bank of Sri Lanka.

In April 2022, he was approached to replace Ajith Nivard Cabraal as the new governor of the Central Bank of Sri Lanka with the latter decided to resign due to mounting pressures from the 2022 Sri Lankan protests.

== Education ==
Weerasinghe studied at Rahula College, Matara and Ananda College, Colombo and gained his Bachelor of Science degree from the University of Kelaniya. Weerasinghe holds a PhD and Master's Degree in economics from the Australian National University.

== Career ==
Prior to being promoted as the deputy governor of CBSL on 27 September 2011, he had served in as the assistant governor of CBSL from 2009 to 2012. Although, he was promoted as CBSL deputy governor in September 2011, he assumed his duties as deputy governor exactly a year later as of 1 September 2012 due to his commitments with IMF. He was on release to the International Monetary Fund during the time frame between January 2010 to August 2012 which made it impossible for him to simultaneously work for both CBSL and IMF. During when he was promoted as deputy governor of CBSL on 27 September 2011, he was still working as the alternative executive director to the IMF. After the end of his stint at IMF in August 2012, a month later he took charge as the deputy governor of CBSL with immediate effect as of 1 September 2012. As per the provisions of the Monetary Law Act No 58 of 1949, he was appointed as the acting CEO of the Central Bank in December 2019 following the sudden resignation of Indrajit Coomaraswamy on 20 December 2019. The government delayed the appointment of a permanent CBSL governor as it waited for an ideal successor. Nandalal worked as acting CEO of CBSL for around four days before Professor W. D. Lakshman came into fore as the CBSL governor as of 24 December 2019.

During his tenure as deputy governor of CBSL between 2012 and 2020; he supervised numerous departments including Economic Research, Statistics, Domestic Operations, International Operations, Exchange Control, Macro-prudential surveillance, Currency and Communications of CBSL. During his tenure as the deputy governor of CBSL, he had also cautioned the banking sector on the need of adapting and embracing technology and trends to foster the economic growth.

He took an early retirement from central bank in October 2020 as he was sidelined by Gotabaya Rajapaksa administration due to political reasons. The Monetary Board of the CBSL approved the pre-retirement leave of Nandalal despite the fact that the CBSL governors in the past had never approved the pre-retirement leave of any of the deputy governors while requesting them to stay with CBSL until their retirement date.

During his career as a prominent banker, he has made policy reforms and structural changes in various macroeconomic aspects including economic stability, price stability, economic growth, international trade, fiscal policy, international finance, reserve management and global economic issues. He has also served as a member representing various cabinet sub committees on economic issues including Review Power Purchase Agreements, Steering Committee on Market Program for Private Sector Development, Petroleum Refinery Project Coordinating Committee and Financial Sector Monitoring Committee of the Ministry of Finance and Planning. He has also outlined economic policy reforms and framework to address the Sri Lankan economic crisis specifically pointing out on how Balance of Payment crisis could lead to an entire banking crisis in Sri Lanka.

He served as a visiting lecturer in the field of Economics at the University of Colombo and he also served as a visiting lecturer as the research economist at the South East Asian Central Banks Research and Training Centre (SEACEN) in Malaysia from 2000 to 2004. In addition, he also served as the visiting research fellow at the Australian National University where he also previously graduated with a Doctorate of Philosophy. He delivered the Olcott Oration 2017 on the subject matter 'Evolution of Monetary and Exchange Rate Policy in Sri Lanka and the Way Forward' in an annual event organized by the Ananda College Old Boys' Association.

He has published several research papers in international and local journals some of which are – CBSL Staff Studies 2001&2002 - Feasibility of Inflation Targeting in Sri Lanka, SEACEN Occasional Paper Malaysia 2004 on Global Economic Slowdown: Policy Options for SEACEN Economies, Economic Papers published by The Economic Society of Australia on Why do Estimated Rates of Total Factor Productivity in East Asia Differ so much and Which are Best, CBSL Staff Studies 2005 - Trade Policy Openness and Economic Performance: Cross-country Evidence, Commemorative Journal for the 50th Anniversary of the University of Kelaniya 2009 on Inflation and Monetary Policy. He is also an advisory board member of the Centre for Applied Macroeconomic Analysis, Crawford School of Public Policy, Australian National University. He was also responsible for negotiating financial services in bilateral trade and services agreements with China and Singapore.

In early April President Gotabaya Rajapaksa offered the post of Governor of the Central Bank of Sri Lanka to Weerasinghe and he accepted the position. He assumed his duties as CBSL governor as of 7 April 2022. He replaced Ajith Nivard Cabraal as his successor to become the 17th governor of the Central Bank of Sri Lanka. He was on a personal visit to Australia during the time when he was appointed.
