= St. Servatius' College, Matara =

St. Servatius' College

Location
- St Servatius' Road, Kotuwegoda; Matara; Sri Lanka; 5.943903°N 80.551987°E

Information
- Type: National School
- Motto: Latin: Esto - Vir; English: Be a Man
- Religious affiliation: Catholic
- Patron saint: Saint Servatius of Tongres
- Established: 2 November 1897; 128 years ago
- Founder: Augustus Standeart
- Principal: H. K. L. B. Virajit
- Staff: 180+
- Teaching staff: 150+
- Age range: 6 to 19
- Enrollment: 4000+
- Colors: Green and white
- Song: "Esto vir in matara"
- Sports: Cricket, Football, Basketball, Volleyball, Chess, Karate, Wushu, Swimming
- Rival: St. Thomas' College, Matara.
- Alumni: Old Servatians
- Website: St. Servetius' College

St. Servatius' College is a boys' school located in Matara, Sri Lanka. The school was established in 1897 by recently arrived Belgian Jesuit missionaries, led by Joseph Van Reeth, first bishop of Galle and Father Augustus Standaert. St. Servatius' College is a national school, which provides primary and secondary education. This is the only school in Sri Lanka where three Governors of the Central Bank of Sri Lanka were educated. This is the only school in Sri Lanka that has produced national team captains in the sports of cricket, football and volleyball.

== History ==
St. Servatius' College was founded when the Bishop of Galle, Joseph Van Reeth (in French), wanted to create an educational infrastructure in the newly established diocese, and called on the Belgian Jesuits for help.

Father Augustus Standaert and a few other Belgian Jesuits arrived in Galle in 1896, and on 2 November 1897, the priests opened an English medium school on a small plot of land on the banks of the River Nilwala in Pallimulla, Matara. The school opened with five students in 1896, and within two years it had grown to accommodate 54 students.

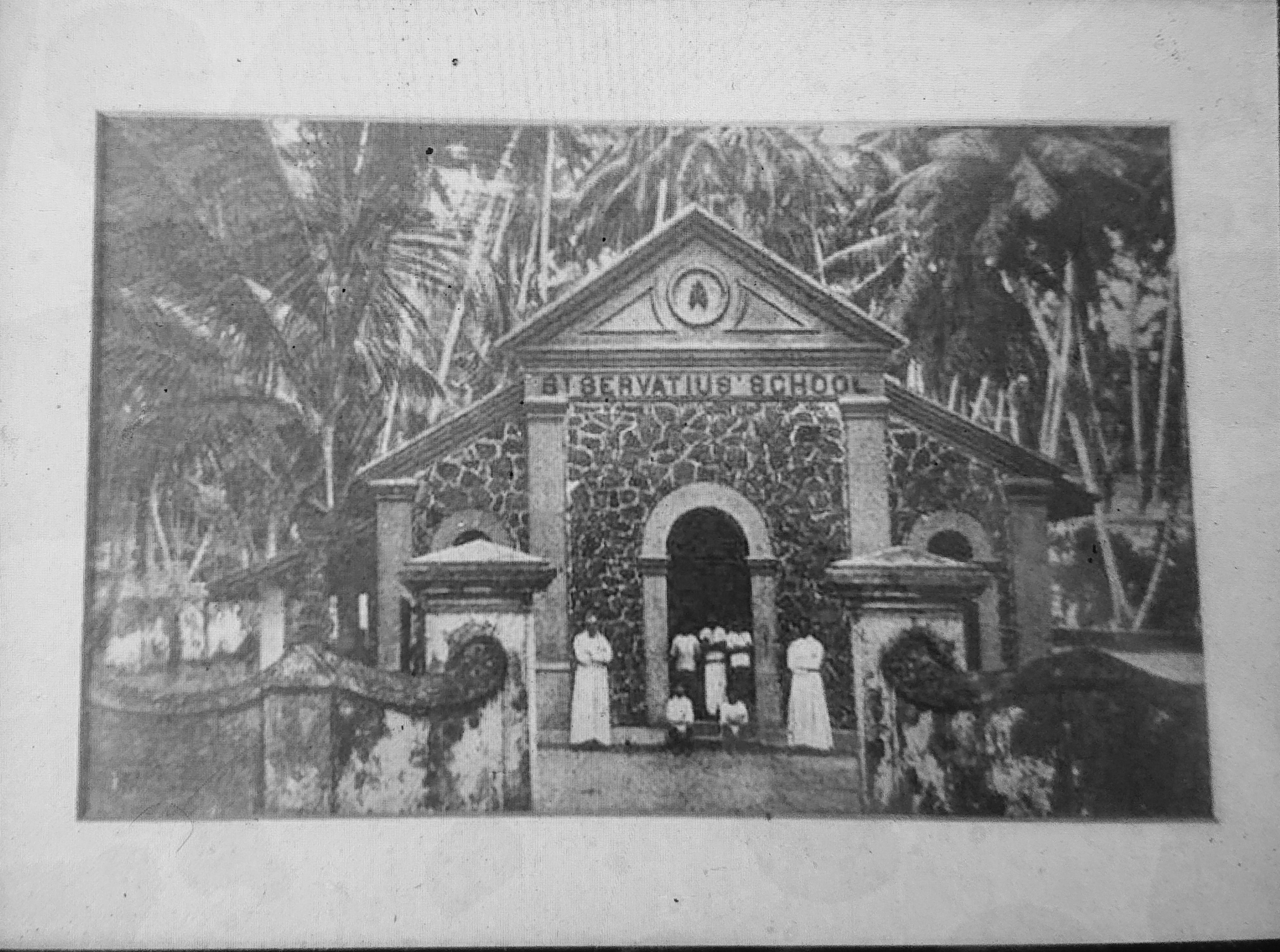
Old St. Servatius' College

In August 1898, a new structure was erected for the school. As the construction funds came from the St. Servatius Jesuit school of Liège, Belgium, the Matara school adopted the name of this patron saint: Servais de Tongres, a 4th-century Belgian missionary, and one of the first bishops in the area around Tongeren, Maastricht, and Liège.

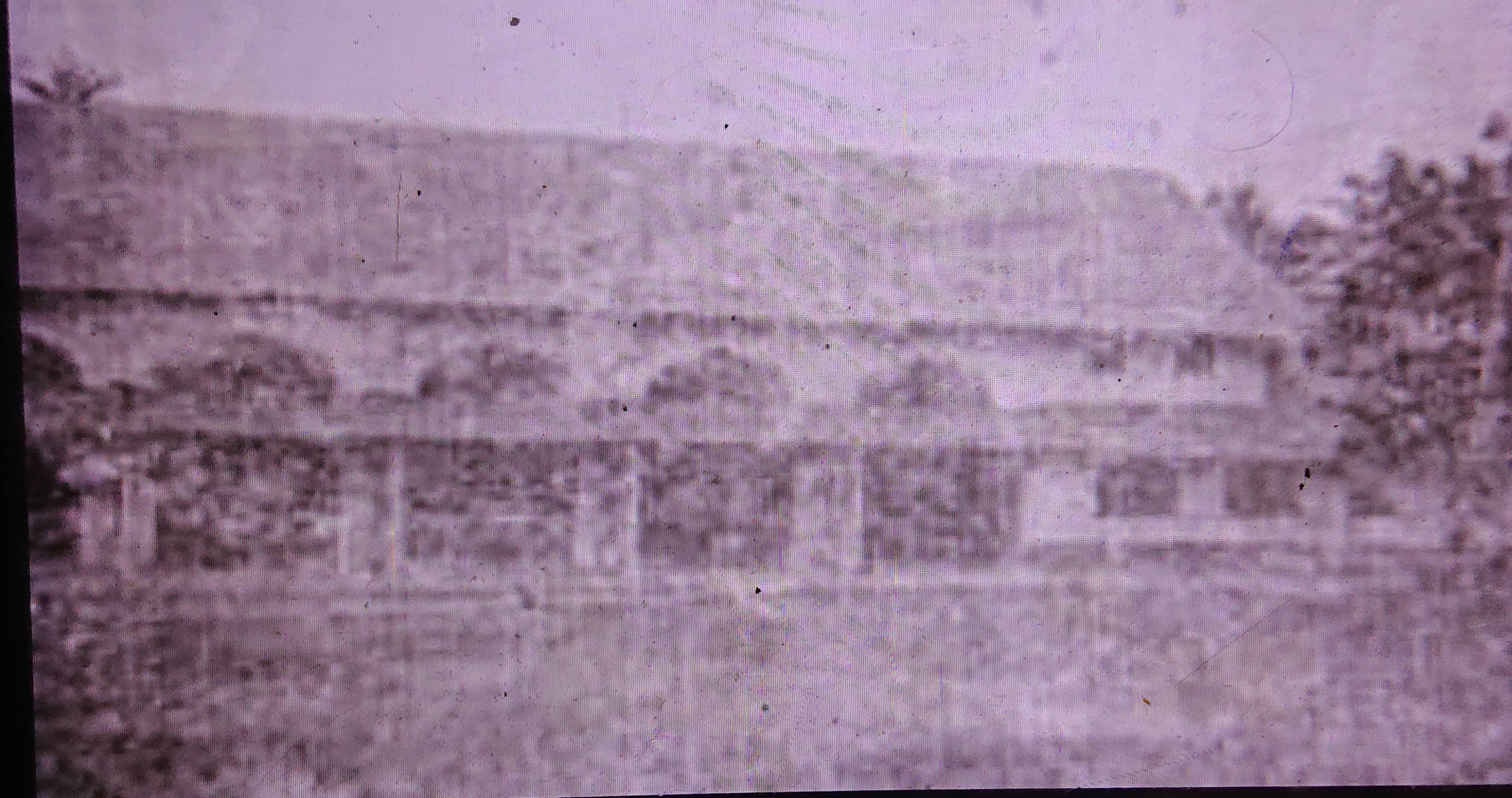
Old St. Servatius College Main Hall

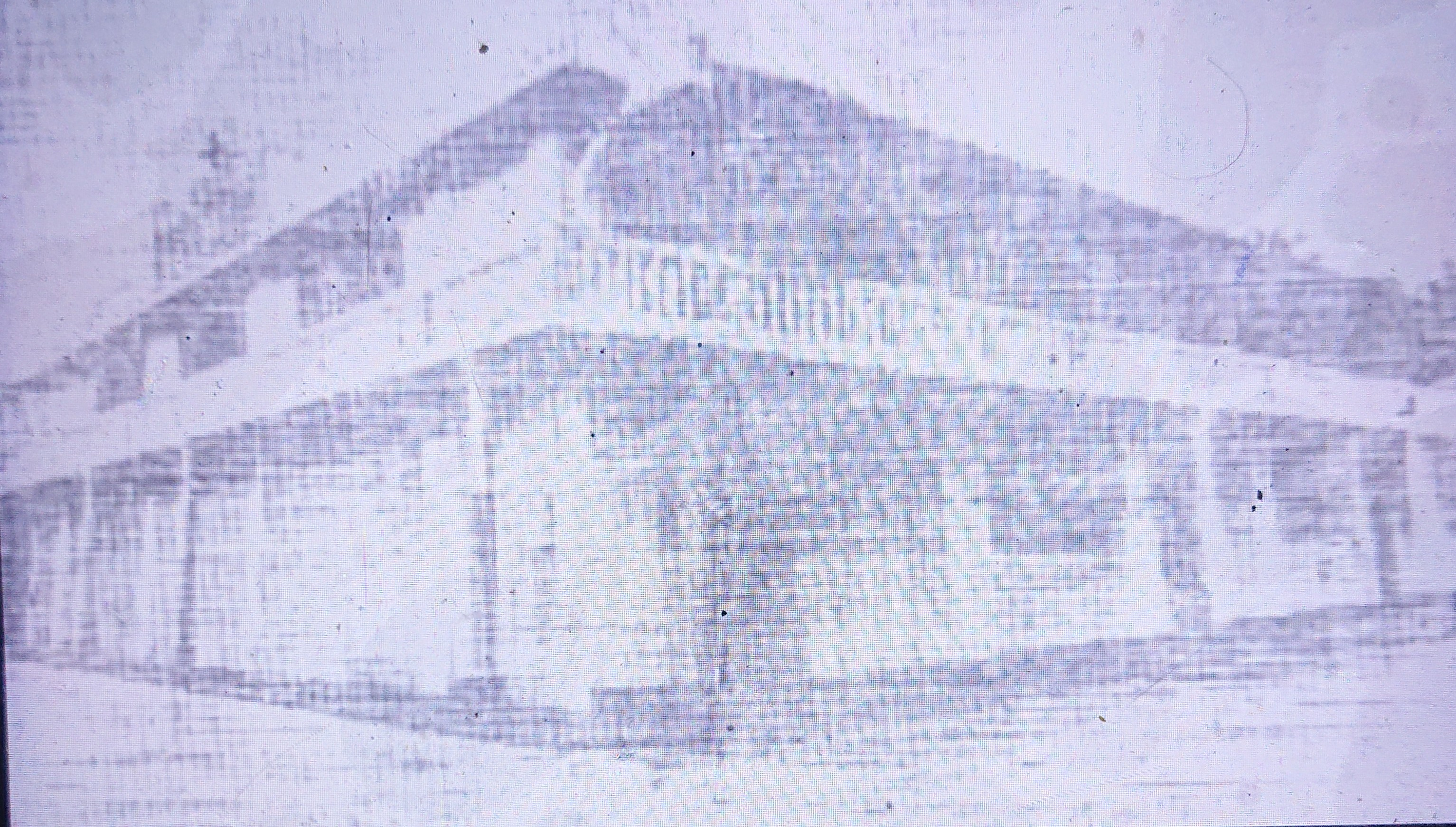
Old Joe Rajapaksa Hall

After some years the school was moved to its present location in Kotuwegoda, Matara. In 1961, as part of a government program to take over private schools, the school was adopted by the Ministry of Education, although it remained administered by Roman Catholic fathers until 1965.

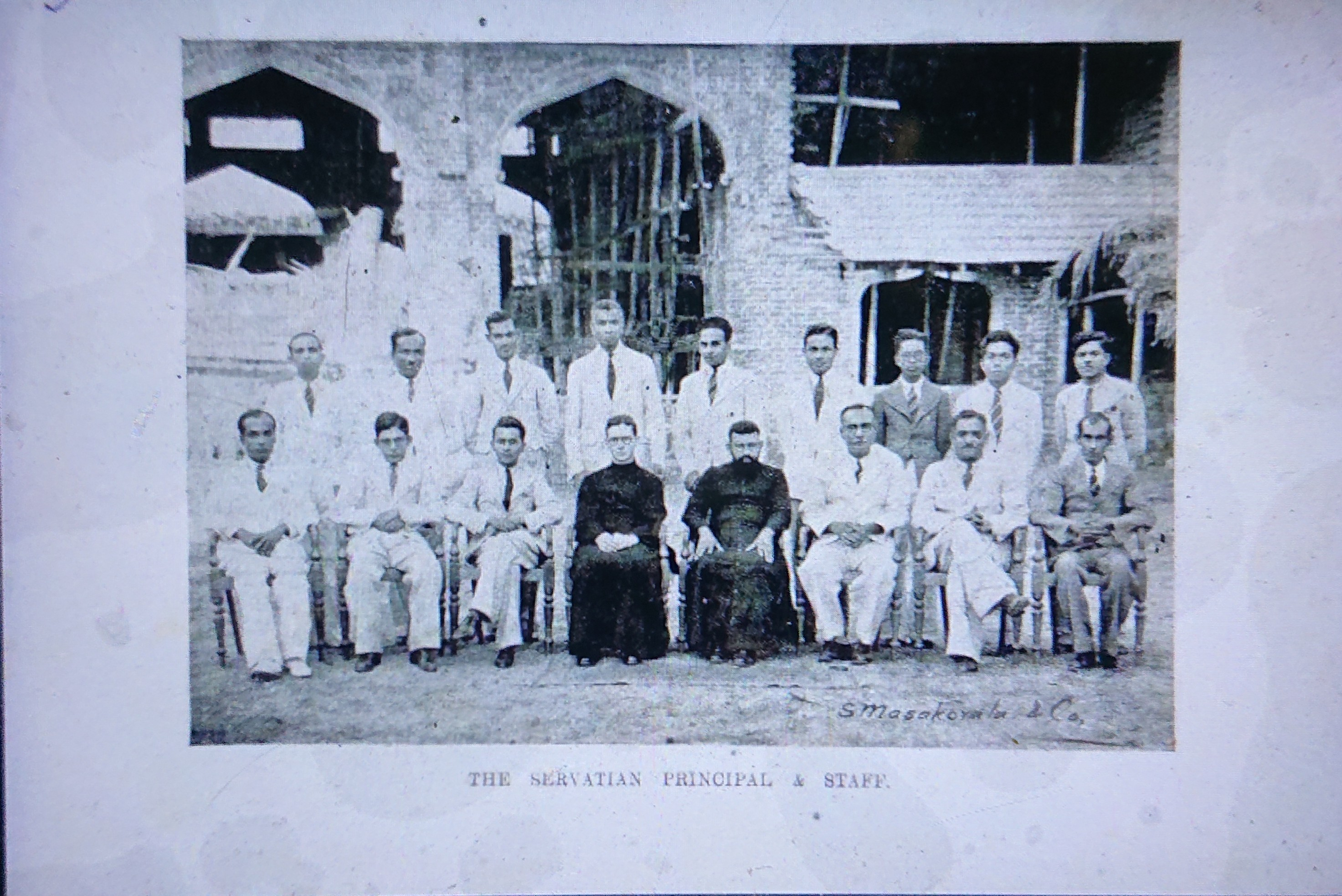
St. Servatius College principal and Staff

Currently, over 3,000 students are enrolled at St. Servatius' College. The school employs over one hundred staff, led by principal H. K. L. B. Virajith. It was made a Sri Lankan national school in 1993.

== Principals ==
Ordinal	Officeholder	Period
1	Augustus Standaert	1897–1901
2	Adolph Closset	1901–1905
3	Anthony Weapon	1905
4	W. Wickramasinghe	1905–1910
5	A. Beernaert	1910
6	Samson Costa	unknown
7	E. Frutsaert	1922
8	Olivier Feron	1922–1930
9	S. G. Perera	unknown
10	S. Crubg	unknown
11	E. Bastineer	unknown
12	Terrence de Silva	1930–1933
13	Mark Anthony Fernando	unknown
14	P. M. Baguet	1942–1945
15	Angia	1945
16	Alles	1945
17	C. Guida	1945–1947
18	Joe Rajapaksa	1947–1966
19	S. E. Munaweera	1967–1968
20	J. Shelton De Silva	1968–1970
21	S. K. H. Jayawardena	1970–1971
22	G. L. Galappaththi	1971–1985
23	K. A. Dharmadasa	1985–1986
24	M. J. Gunasekera	1987–1997
25	A. H. N. Jayaweera	1997
26	M. G. R. M. Wijesinghe	1997–1998
27	D. Jayaweera	1998–2000
28	W. Somawantha	2000–2001
29	Kodippili	2001–2002
30	D. Vidanapathirana	2002–2008
31	Nimalsiri Wanigabadhu	2008–2012
32	Ashoka Kumara	2012 – April 2013
33	K. Ranasinha	April 2013 – October 2014
34	M. Rathnasekara	October 2014 – 2018
35	K. H. L. M. Kawshalya	2018 – 2019
36	H. K. L. B. Virajith	2019 – 2026
37	Samitha Kurukulasooriya	2026 – present

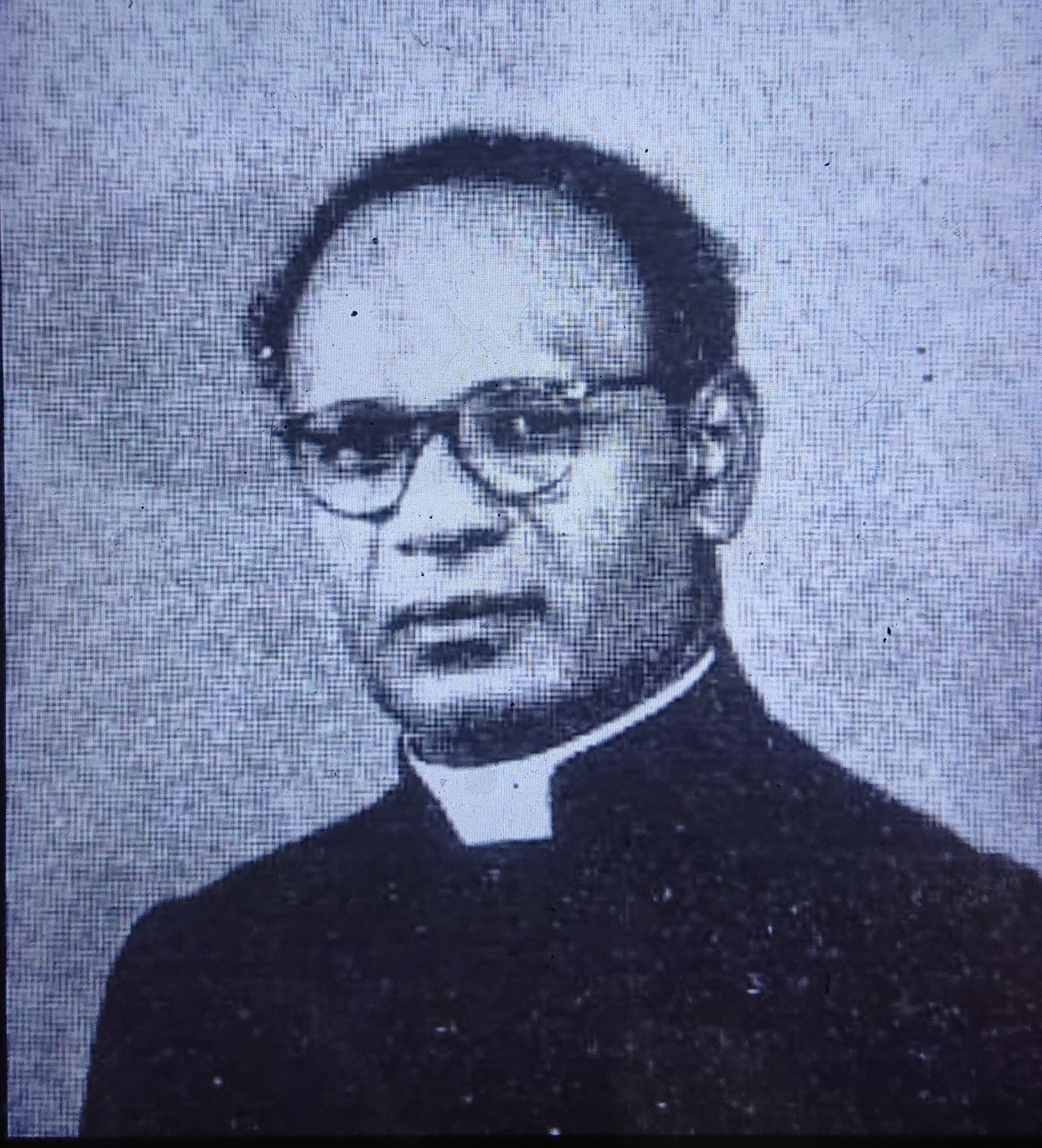
Joe Rajapaksa

== College houses ==
College house names are listed in alphabetical order.

- Adolphust -
- Beernaert -
- Standaert -
- Walter -

== Cricket ==
The St. Thomas'–St. Servatius Cricket Encounter, known as the Battle of the Blues, is the annual cricket match played between the cricket teams of St. Servatius' College and St. Thomas' College, Matara. The match has been played since 1900, and is the second-oldest school cricket series in Sri Lanka.

== Notable alumni ==
Name	Notability	Reference
Sanath Jayasuriya	International Cricket player (1989–2011), Member of Parliament for Matara (2010–2015)	
Ruchira Palliyaguruge	International Cricket umpire (2011–present), first-class cricket player (1989–2008)	
Kasun Rajitha	International Cricket player (2016–present)	
Anslem de Silva	Biologist, herpetologist	
Warnasena Rasaputra	Governor of Central Bank (1979–88)	
N. U. Jayawardena	1st Ceylonese Governor of Central Bank (1953–54), founder of Sampath Bank (1986-?)	
Sunil Mendis	Governor of Central Bank (2004–06)	
Anura Senanayake	Senior DIG of Sri Lankan Police	
Bandu Samarasinghe	Actor	
Lakshman Yapa Abeywardena	Member of Sri Lankan Parliament for Matara (2004–10)	
Dullas Alahapperuma	Member of Sri Lankan Parliament for Matara (1994-2001, 2015–present)	
Justin Galappaththi	Member of Sri Lankan Parliament for Matara (2001–04)	
Mahinda Wijesekara	Member of Sri Lankan Parliament for Matara (1989–94, 2001–04)	
Chathura Gunaratne	National Footballer (2006–14)	
Kavindu Ishan	National Footballer (2010-?)	
Nilantha Premaratne	26th Commander of the Sri Lanka Army (2026–present)	

== See also ==
- List of Jesuit schools
- Basilica of Saint Servatius
- Servatius of Tongeren
- Joseph Van Reeth
