= Ajith Cabraal =

Sri Lankan account and former Governor of the Central Bank of Sri Lanka (born 1954)

Ajith Nivard Cabraal
- අජිත් නිවාඩ් කබ්රාල් அஜித் நிவர்ட் கப்ரால்
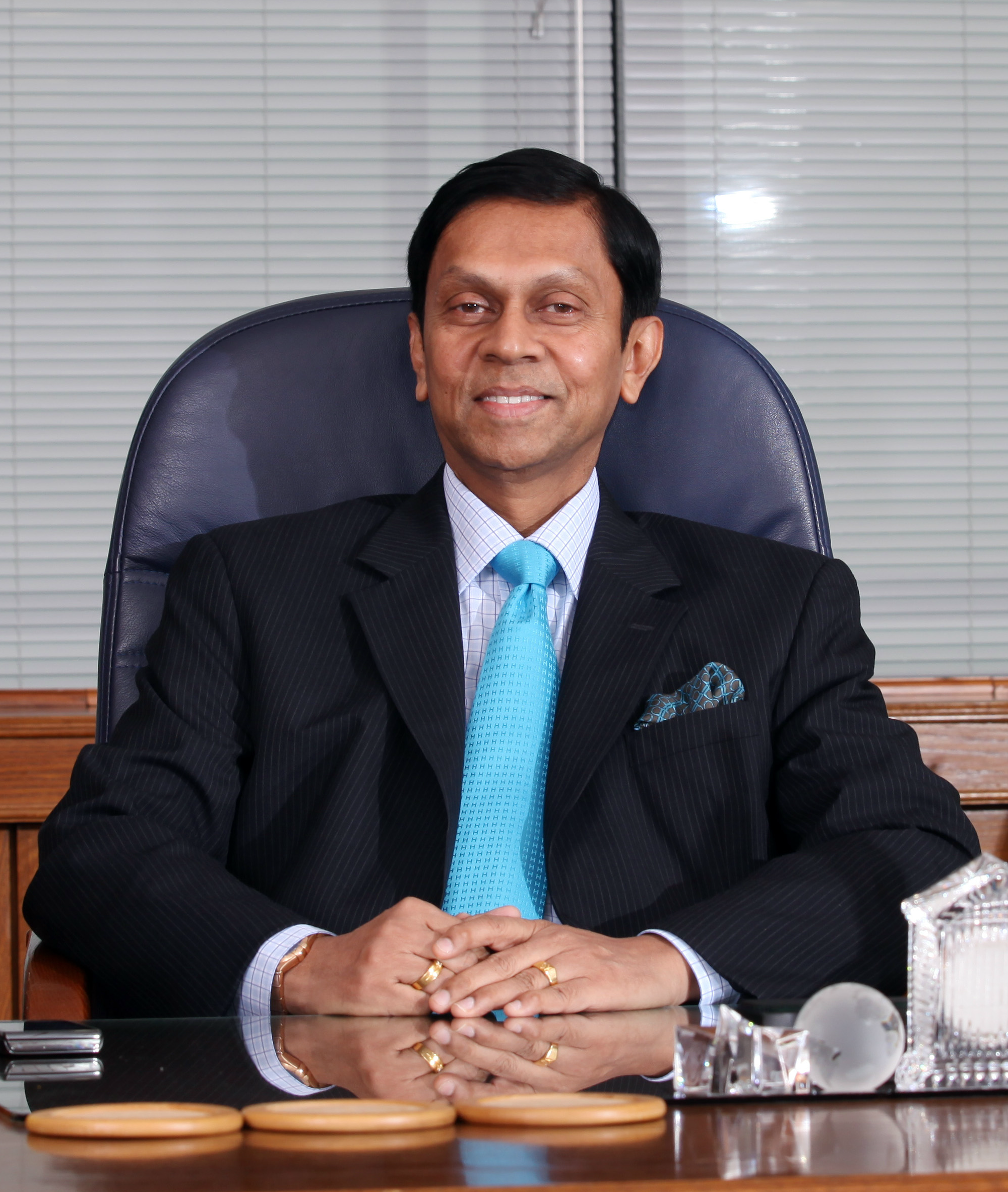

Governor of the Central Bank of Sri Lanka
- In office 15 September 2021 – 4 April 2022
- Preceded by: W. D. Lakshman
- Succeeded by: Nandalal Weerasinghe
- In office 1 July 2006 – 9 January 2015
- Preceded by: Sunil Mendis
- Succeeded by: Arjuna Mahendran

State Minister of Money and Capital Markets and State Enterprise Reform
- In office 12 August 2020 – 13 September 2021

Secretary to the Ministry of Plan Implementation
- In office 1 November 2005 – 1 July 2006

Member of Parliament for National List
- In office 2020–2021
- Succeeded by: Jayantha Ketagoda

Personal details
- Born: 14 December 1954 (age 71) Tangalle, Ceylon
- Party: Sri Lanka Podujana Peramuna
- Other political affiliations: Sri Lanka People's Freedom Alliance; United People's Freedom Alliance; United National Party
- Spouse: Roshini Cabraal
- Education: St. Peter's College, Colombo
- Profession: Chartered Accountant
- Website: www.ajithnivardcabraal.com

Ajith Nivard Cabraal (Sinhala: අජිත් නිවාඩ් කබ්රාල්) (born 14 December 1954) is a Sri Lankan accountant and politician who was also the 16th Governor of the Central Bank of Sri Lanka. He is also the former State Minister of Finance, Capital Markets and State Enterprise Reforms and a former National List Member of Parliament from 2020 to 2021. He served as the Governor of the Central Bank of Sri Lanka, holding the post from 1 July 2006 until his resignation on 9 January 2015. He again became the Governor of Central Bank of Sri Lanka in September 2021, replacing W. D. Lakshman, and resigned again in April 2022.

== Early life and education ==
Born in Tangalle to Dr Leslie Cabraal, a medical practitioner and Trixie Cabraal; he had four siblings. Cabraal was educated at St. Peter's College, Colombo, and was qualified as a Chartered accountant from the Institute of Chartered Accountants of Sri Lanka.

== Private sector career ==
Cabraal started his career as an accountant in the private sector and established a management consulting firm called the Cabraal Consulting Group specialised on corporate governance (strategic planning, mediation) and turnarounds. In 2000, he gained an Eisenhower Fellowship.

== Political career ==
=== Western provincial council ===
He started his political career as a member of the United National Party when he contested the provincial council elections in 1999 and was elected to the Provincial council of the Western Province, a position he held until 2004.

=== Chief economic advisor ===
Having first met Mahinda Rajapaksa, who was studying law at Sri Lanka Law College when Cabraal was an accountancy student, he quickly became a close confidant Rajapaksa after the latter's appointment as Prime Minister Rajapaksa in 2004, and became his chief economic advisor. In 2005, he left the private sector and was appointed Secretary to the Ministry of Plan Implementation. In February 2006, Cabraal was involved in talks with the Tamil Tigers in Geneva.

He was president of the Institute of Chartered Accountants of Sri Lanka and also held the positions of President of the South Asian Federation of Accountants.

=== Governor of the Central Bank – first term ===
On 1 July 2006, Cabraal was appointed governor of the Central Bank of Sri Lanka by President Rajapaksa, for a period of four years. He was given an extension of six years from 1 July 2010, to 30 June 2016. During his period as the Governor he also functioned as an Alternate Governor of the International Monetary Fund, the Chairman of the South East Asian Central Banks Research and Training Centre (SEACEN) Board of Governors, and the Chairman of the SAARC Central Bank Governors Forum. Following the 2015 presidential election, he resigned on 9 January 2015 so that the new President of Sri Lanka can appoint a new Governor of the Central Bank of Sri Lanka. He was accused of financial misappropriation following investment in Greek sovereign bonds which resulted in a major loss to the government during his first term.

From December 2019 to August 2020, Cabraal was a senior advisor to the prime minister on economic affairs and was appointed as a board member of the "Api Wenuwen Api" fund on 21 January 2020 under the Ministry of Defence.

=== State Minister of Money and Capital Markets and State Enterprise Reform ===
Cabraal was appointed to the Parliament of Sri Lanka from the national list of the Sri Lanka Podujana Peramuna after the 2020 Sri Lankan parliamentary election. He was thereafter appointed State Minister of Finance, Capital Markets and State Enterprise Reforms by President Gotabaya Rajapaksa in August 2020 serving under the Minister of Finance Mahinda Rajapaksa. He also functions as a member of the Committee On Public Enterprises (Sri Lanka) and the Ministerial Consultative Committee on Finance. He resigned as state minister and member of parliament on 13 September 2020 to take the post of governor of the central bank.

=== Governor of the Central Bank – second term ===
Cabraal assumed his second term as governor of the central bank 15 September 2021 at a time Sri Lanka was facing a major debt crisis. He requested for and gained cabinet rank as the Governor of the Central Bank. During his tenure, Central Bank was engaged in printing in excess of trillions of money to finance the budget and economic crisis. During his tenure, CBSL allegedly printed Rs. 22.27 billion rupees overnight on 14 March 2022.

Cabraal opposed an IMF bailout in favour of a homegrown solution for the debt crisis. Having depleted foreign currency reserves and gold reserves to boost the Sri Lankan Rupee and repayment of sovereign bonds, the central bank free floated of the currency in early March which saw a 30% depreciation of the Rupee against the dollar in days following major shortages of fuel, food and medicine.

On 4 April 2022, he resigned from his position as CBSL governor amid the growing protests over economic crisis.

== Conviction of economic mismanagement ==
On 7 April 2022, the Colombo Magistrate Court issued an order preventing Cabraal from leaving Sri Lanka until 18 April 2022. The court order was issued on the basis of a case filed by political activist Keerthi Tennakoon against Cabraal regarding misappropriation and misuse of public funds which led to a massive economic crisis in Sri Lanka.

Cabraal along with the Rajapakasha brothers and other senior officials were found guilty of economic mismanagement between 2019 and 2022 by the Supreme Court of Sri Lanka which stated on 14 November 2023 that the respondents have breached the fundamental rights to equal protection of the law in terms of Article 12(1) of the Constitution in a fundamental rights petition filed by filed by Transparency International Sri Lanka (TISL) and other four activists.
