= Don William Rajapatirana =

Don William Rajapathirana, OBE was a Sri Lankan civil servant. He was the Governor of the Central Bank of Ceylon.

Educated at Ananda College, Colombo, he won the entrance scholarship to Ceylon University College in 1923 and in the following year entered the London School of Economics where he Cassel Scholarship which allowed him to study an year at the Columbia Business School. On his return to Ceylon in 1927, he gained appointment as an Assistant Accountant at the Ceylon Government Railways. In 1932 he joined the Income Tax Department, later becoming the Additional Controller of Exchange and thereafter the Commissioner of Income Tax in 1947. A member of the Board of Accountancy in Ceylon, he was appointed Adviser to the Central Bank in 1951 by the Monetary Board. In 1953, he became the Deputy Governor of the Central Bank and was appointed Governor of the Central Bank in July 1959 and served till August 1967. He was appointed an Officer of the Order of the British Empire (OBE) in the 1951 New Year Honours while serving as Commissioner of Income Tax, Estate Duty and Stamps.
