= Sri Lanka sovereign default =

Sri Lanka sovereign debt crisis

Economy of Sri Lanka - Sovereign debt crisis
- Fiscal year: April 2022 on going

Statistics
- GDP: 80.7 billion (2020)
- GDP growth: -3.6% 2020
- GDP per capita: 3,682 (2020)

External
- Gross external debt: $54.3bn with private

Public finance
- Budget balance: -12.8 % (2021 est)
- All values, unless otherwise stated, are in US dollars.

Sri Lanka declared the country was suspending payment on most foreign debt from April 12, 2022, kindling the Asian island's first sovereign default event and ending an unblemished record of repaying external debt despite experiencing milder currency crises in the past. By April Sri Lanka was suffering the worst monetary crisis in its history with a steeply falling rupee, high inflation and forex shortages which triggered shortfalls of fuel, power and medicine. Widespread public protests led to a political crisis. In March, the International Monetary Fund released a report saying publicly for the first time that the country's debt was unsustainable and required re-structuring. Authorities had advertised for financial and legal advisors to help negotiate with creditors shortly before the suspension was announced.

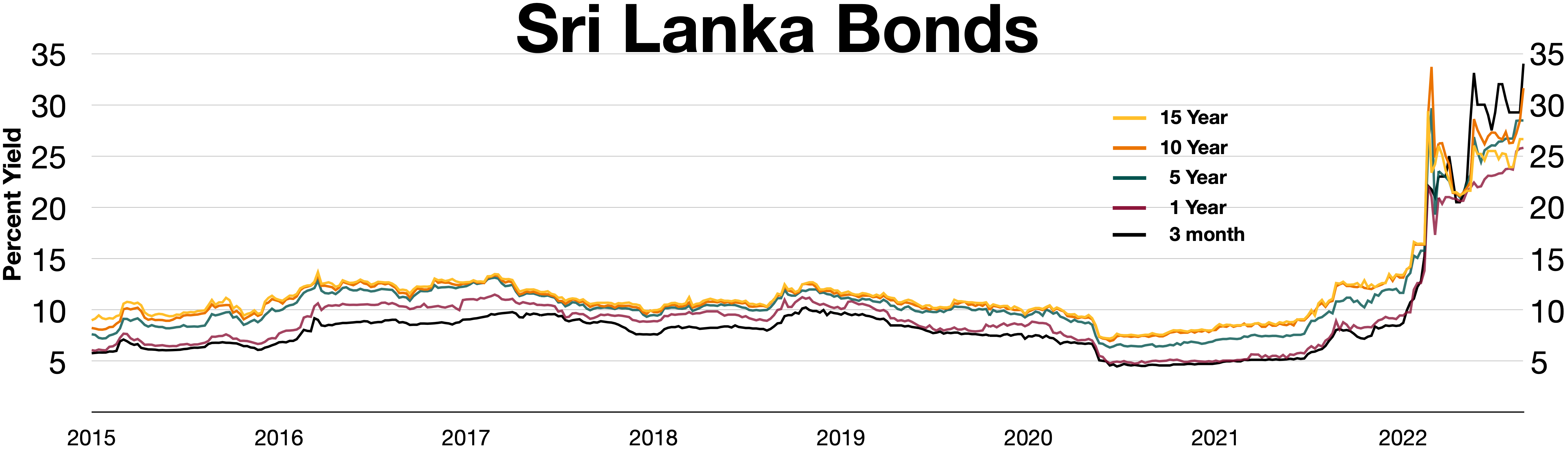
Sri Lanka bonds spiked in 2022 Inverted yield curve in the first half of 2022 15 year bonds 10 year bonds 5 year bonds 1 year bonds 6 month bonds

== Overview ==
Sri Lanka has seen external instability from around late 2014 suffering two currency crises and low growth with the rupee falling from 131 to 182 to the US dollar by 2018. Foreign debt rose from 30% of gross domestic product in 2014 to 41.3% in 2019 while total debt went up from 76% to 86% as growth slowed amid Sovereign bond borrowings also expanded. In December 2019, Sri Lanka's newly elected government cut taxes in a fiscal stimulus, sharply lowering state revenues and followed up in the first quarter of 2020 with policy rate cuts which were enforced by large scale money printing, unleashing unprecedented volumes of liquidity in to money markets. The Coronavirus pandemic hit the country and a lockdown started in March 2020. Though Sri Lanka drew praise for its handling of the pandemic and swift vaccination of the population, money printing worsened with unusually large central bank financing of the government triggering the worst balance of payments crisis in the country's history. Then central bank Governor W D Lakshman was said to have been following Modern Monetary Theory. Sri Lanka's sovereign rating was progressively downgraded and the country was locked out of capital markets and was unable to roll-over maturing sovereign bonds.

The IMF in its 2021 Article IV Consultations report concluded that Sri Lanka's public debt was unsustainable. "The country has started experiencing a combined debt and BoP crisis...", the report asid. "Staff assesses that Sri Lanka's public debt is unsustainable." The report warned that continued central bank financing will worsen inflation and could lead to an external trade collapse and even higher inflation. "[T]he country could experience significant contractions in imports and private credit growth, or monetary instability in case of further central bank financing of fiscal deficits. And continued reliance on central bank financing would eventually lead to a de-anchoring of inflation expectations." An attempt to float the currency in March 2022 did not succeed and forex shortages continued to persist with the rupee falling from 202 to below to 300 the dollar. Forex shortages had triggered power, fuel and medicine shortages leading to widespread protests. On April 3 the Cabinet of ministers resigned. Sri Lanka's newly appointed Central Bank Governor Nandalal Weerasinghe sharply raised policy rates on April 8 allowing interest rates to go up and reduce money printing. By end March foreign reserves were down to US$1.9bn and there were concerns over their actual usability since about US$1.5bn which had come from a Renminbi swap from China. On April 12, the Finance Ministry announced a halt to payments of most foreign debt, ahead of restructuring. After the technical agreement on a IMF programme (staff-level agreement), the Paris Club invited major creditors to form an official creditor committee on September 2, 2022. On January 25, 2023, the Creditor committee formed by Paris Club, India and Hungary provided its financing assurances to the IMF to allow for the programme to be formally approved by the IMF Board. On February 3, 2023, China provided Sri Lanka with an offer of extending its debt and requested other major debt leaders to do the same.

== Chronology ==
- 2 March 2022 – The IMF releases a statement following a review of the 2021 Article IV reports saying publicly for the first time that the lender had found Sri Lanka's debt to be unsustainable.
- 25 March 2022 – The complete IMF staff report which had been blocked by Sri Lanka authorities is released after permission is given.
- 3 April 2022 - Sri Lanka's cabinet ministers resign as protests intensify
- 4 April 2022 - Central Bank Governor Nivard Cabraal resigns
- 5 April 2022 - Treasury Secretary Sajith Attygalle resigns
- 7 April 2022 - The President's office announces that three experts, ex-central bank governor Indrajit Coomaraswamy, Shanta Devarajan, a professor at Georgetown University and a former World Bank official and Sharmini Coorey, a former director of the IMF's Institute of Capacity Development have been appointed to advice on 'Multilateral Engagement and Debt Sustainability'.
- 8 April 2022 - Newly appointed Central Bank Governor Nandalal Weerasinghe hikes policy rates by a record 700 basis points to 14.5 percent from 7.50 percent.
- 12 April 2022 - Treasury Secretary Mahinda Siriwardene and Central Bank Governor Nandalal Weerasinghe in a joint press conference announce the suspension of debt payments. Dollar denominated Sri Lanka Development Bonds to be excluded.
- 13 April 2022 - Standard and Poors' downgrades Sri Lanka to CC and says on track to be downgraded to SD (selective default) after the first payment is missed.
- 14 April 2022 - Fitch Ratings downgrades Sri Lanka to C and says on track to be downgraded to RD (restricted default) after the first payment is missed.
- 18 April 2022 - Moody's downgrades Sri Lanka to 'Ca' saying the suspension would lead to a series of defaults

== Restructuring process ==
The re-structuring would apply to bilateral and multilateral debt and sovereign bond holders. Domestically sold dollar denominated bonds would be exempt. Until a restructuring proposal can be presented arrears would be capitalized and a new debt instrument issued at the same interest rate. Creditors could opt to receive suspended payments in Sri Lanka rupees.

As for the official bilateral creditors, a committee formed by the Paris Club, India and Hungary was formed. Other bilaterals negotiate bilaterally with Sri Lanka.

== See also ==
- 2019–present Sri Lankan economic crisis
- Economy of Sri Lanka
