= Heen Banda Dissanayaka =

Sri Lankan civil servant (1937–2023)

Heen Banda Dissanayake, SLAS (28 August 1937 – 5 March 2023) was a Sri Lankan civil servant. He was the Governor of the Central Bank of Ceylon.

Born to a peasant family in the village of Musnewa, Anuradhapura District. His father was Dissanayake Mudiyanselage Kirihamige Tikiri Banda, a paddy farmer and his mother was Wijekoone Mudiyanselage Ranmenika. He was the second child of three children, born on 28 August 1937. He received his primary education in the village school, Negampaha Maha Vidyalaya. In 1947, he was sent to Kekirawa Central College, where he completed his Senior School Certificate and thereafter attended Ananda Sastralaya, Kotte. He graduated from the University of Ceylon, Peradeniya with the BA honours degree in Sinhala.

He joined the Ceylon Administration Service after passing the entrance exam and was posted as Assistant Government Agent, Matara and was appointed Assistant Secretary to the Public Service Commission in 1964. He then was Additional Government Agent of Kurunegala District; Government Agent of Kurunegala and then was General Manager of the Industrial Development Board from 1972 to 1974. He then was Deputy Director General Customs from 1974 to 1976, Director General Customs from 1976 to 1987, Alternate Executive Director of the Asian Development Bank (ADB) in Manila from 1987 to 1989. In 1989 he was appointed Deputy Secretary to the Treasury and in July 1992 he was appointed Governor of the Central Bank and served till November 1995. Thereafter he was Alternate Executive Director of the International Monetary Fund (IMF) in Washington from 1996 to 1998. Following his retirement he was chief executive officer of IWS Logistic.
