= A. S. Jayawardena =

Sri Lankan economist and civil servant

Amarananda Somasiri Jayawardena
- Born: 3 August 1936
- Died: May 29, 2018 (aged 81)
- Burial place: General Cemetery, Borella
- Education: University of Ceylon, Peradeniya (B.A. in Economics); London School of Economics (MEcon, 1964); Harvard University (M.P.Adm., 1975)
- Occupations: economist civil servant

Amarananda Somasiri Jayawardena (3 August 1936 – 29 May 2018) was a Sri Lankan economist and civil servant. He served as Governor of the Central Bank of Sri Lanka, the permanent secretary of the Ministry of Finance & Treasury and an Alternate Executive Director of the International Monetary Fund (IMF). He died on 29 May 2018 at the age of 81 or 82.

== Education ==
A. S. Jayawardena received his primary education at the St. Agnes Convent and St. Thomas' College, Matale. Afterwards, he completed his secondary education at the Royal College, Colombo where he won the Henry De Mel Prize for Sinhala. Thereafter he read economics at the University of Ceylon, Peradeniya winning Colours of Athletics and graduating with a B.A. degree in economics with honors. Later he gained a master's degree in economics from the London School of Economics in 1965 and a Master of Public Administration Degree from Harvard University in 1975. While in Harvard, he became an Edward Mason Fellow.

== Career ==
In 1958, he joined the Central Bank of Ceylon as a junior executive and was promoted as Senior Economist Grade 2 in 1963. He served on secondment for two years in the Ministry of Plantation Industries as the Ministry Colvin R. de Silva's Economic Advisor and Director Planning. After returning to the Central Bank as Deputy Director Economic Research, he was appointed the general manager of the Bank of Ceylon on which he served from 1976 to 1977. Thereafter he served in the Land Reforms Commission and as Director Settlements.

He returned to the Central Bank as Director of Economic Research and was appointed the International Monetary Fund Executive Director for Sri Lanka, India and Bangladesh based in Washington, from 1981 to 1986. In 1986, he returned to the Central Bank as its Deputy Governor and was later appointed Secretary to the Ministry of Industries, Scientific Affairs. In 1994, he was appointed Chairman of the Bank of Ceylon and shortly took over as Secretary of the Treasury, a post he would hold until 1995. In 1998, he was appointed Governor of the Central Bank which he held until retirement in 2004.

He was buried in the General Cemetery, Borella on 1 June 2018.

== See also ==
- List of Sri Lankan non-career Permanent Secretaries
