= South East Asian Central Banks Research and Training Centre =

International organization in Asia

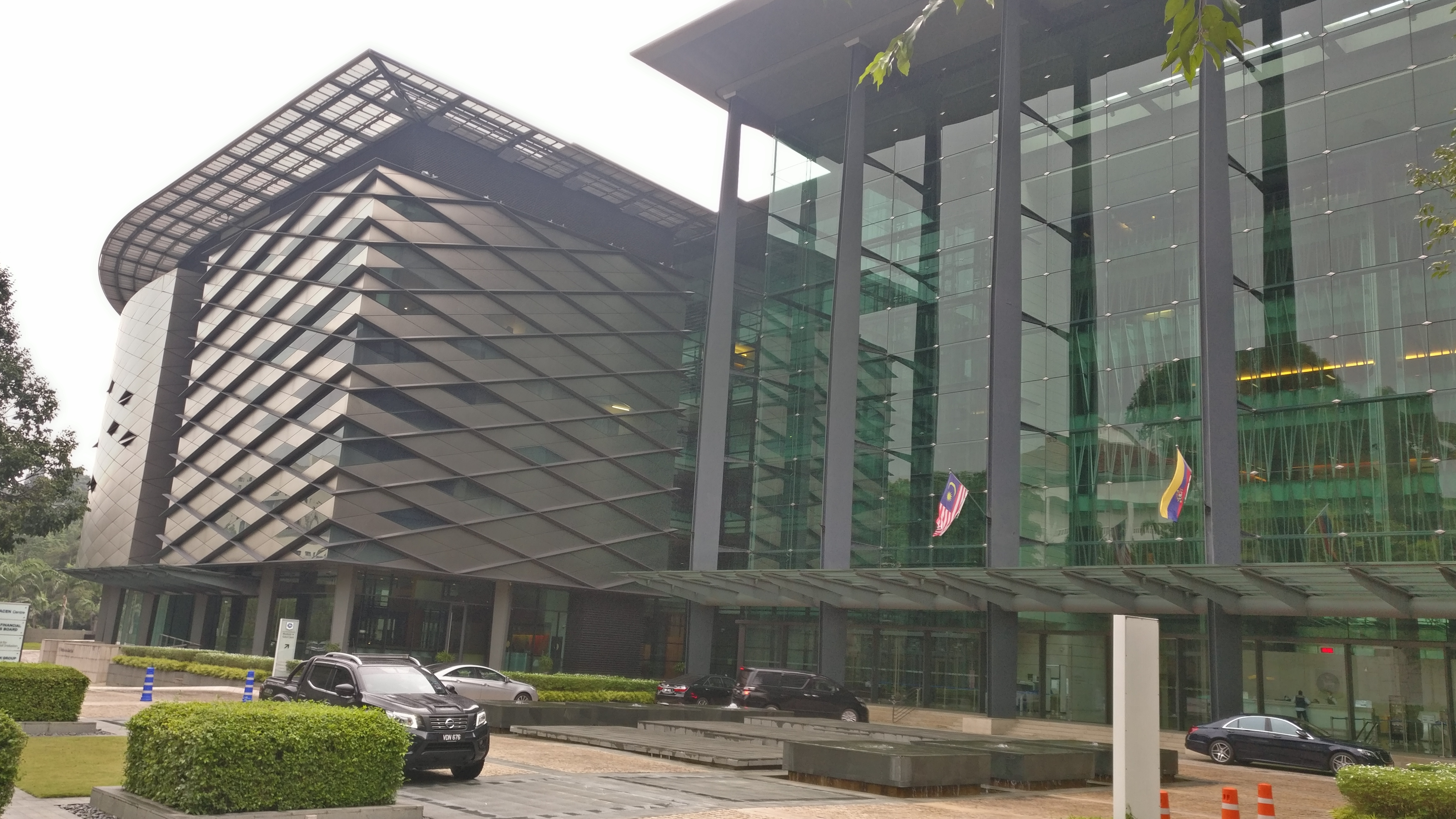
Sasana Kijang complex in Kuala Lumpur, home of SEACEN since 2011

The South East Asian Central Banks Research and Training Centre, generally referred to as the SEACEN Centre or simply SEACEN, is an international organization which brings together central banks from Asia for joint educational, research and other initiatives. SEACEN started in 1966 as an informal initiative of central bankers from Southeast Asia, an origin that remains in its name. As early as its formal establishment in 1982, however, it had already broadened to participants from other parts of Asia, a trend that has been reinforced since then.

The Centre has an outreach of 15 other central banks and monetary authorities which are invited for its learning events, as well as 26 regional and international strategic partners with whom the Centre collaborates in the design and delivery of its courses in central banking knowledge areas (Macroeconomic and Monetary Policy Management; Financial Stability and Supervision; and Payment and Settlement Systems and Leadership and Governance).

== History ==
SEACEN started as an unofficial grouping of central banks governors from the International Monetary Fund's Southeast Asia Voting Group. The first meeting of that group was held in Bangkok on 3–4 February 1966, with participating governors from the National Bank of Laos, Central Bank of Malaysia, Central Bank of the Philippines, Central Bank of Sri Lanka, National Bank of Vietnam, Bank of Thailand, and an official from Singapore. The meeting was co-chaired by Ismail Mohamed Ali (Malaysia) and Puey Ungphakorn (Thailand).

At the next meeting in 1967, which took place in Manila, the governors decided to establish a joint training center in Kuala Lumpur. This vision advanced in 1972, when the governors deciding to established the SEACEN Research and Training Centre in which staff from the Malaysian central bank would train colleagues from other countries. Eventually, at their 17th meeting in Thailand on 3 February 1982, eight governors signed an agreement to establish the SEACEN Research and Training Centre as an autonomous entity.

Since 1992, SEACEN has had ongoing formal engagement with Taiwan, including its central bank but also other authorities such as the Central Deposit Insurance Corporation in Taipei. In 2011, the year when the People's Bank of China joined SEACEN, the Central Bank of the Republic of China (Taiwan) protested after SEACEN referred to it inaccurately as "Central Bank, Chinese Taipei".

== Activities ==
The SEACEN Centre primarily conducts training courses in the core central banking knowledge areas (Macroeconomic and Monetary Policy Management; Financial Stability and Supervision; and Payment and Settlement Systems and Leadership and Governance). These courses are only open to participants from Full, Associate, and Member central banks/monetary authorities. Additionally the Centre runs online seminars and other events on a semi-regular basis. There are also annual high-level meetings involving the Directors or Deputy Governors of the core central banking knowledge areas which determine the subject and focus of the Centre's training offerings.

== Membership ==
As of early 2024, the membership of SEACEN is at follows, with indication of date of accession for ordinary members:

- Ordinary members: Bank Indonesia (1982), Central Bank of Malaysia (1982), Nepal Rastra Bank (1982), Bangko Sentral ng Pilipinas (1982), Monetary Authority of Singapore (1982), Central Bank of Sri Lanka (1982), Bank of Thailand (1982), Central Bank of Myanmar (1982), Bank of Korea (1990), Central Bank of the Republic of China (Taiwan) (1992), Bank of Mongolia (1999), Brunei Darussalam Central Bank (2003), Bank of Papua New Guinea (2005), National Bank of Cambodia (2006), State Bank of Vietnam (2006), People's Bank of China (2011), Bank of the Lao P.D.R. (2012), Reserve Bank of India (2013), and Hong Kong Monetary Authority (2014)
- Associate members: Reserve Bank of Australia, Bangladesh Bank, Royal Monetary Authority of Bhutan, Monetary Authority of Macao, State Bank of Pakistan, National Reserve Bank of Tonga, Reserve Bank of Vanuatu, and Reserve Bank of Fiji
- Observers: Da Afghanistan Bank, Central Bank of Iran, Bank of Japan, Maldives Monetary Authority, Reserve Bank of New Zealand, Central Bank of Samoa, Central Bank of Solomon Islands, and Banco Central de Timor-Leste

Associate Members are invited to participate in all SEACEN learning programs and to the annual SEACEN high-level event involving Governors. Observers are invited solely to participate in SEACEN learning programs. The roles of SEACEN Chair and co-chair are rotated on an annual basis among ordinary members.

== See also ==
- Bank for International Settlements
