= Neville Karunatilake =

Sri Lankan economist and civil servant

H. Neville Sepala Karunatilake (1930 – 24 January 2010) was a Sri Lankan economist and civil servant. He was the former Governor of the Central Bank of Sri Lanka.

Born to Ariyaratna Karunatileke and Neeta Freeda Karunatileke, his father was a land settlement officer in the Land Department. He received his primary education at St Thomas Preparatory College, Kollupitiy, and secondary education at Trinity College, Kandy. Thereafter he gained a scholarship to University of Ceylon, graduating in 1951 with a BA special degree in economics. Later he gained an MSc in economics from the London School of Economics on a Colombo Plan scholarship and an MPA and MA in economics from Harvard University in on a Fulbright Research Fellowship. He went on to gain his PhD in economics from the University of London.

After graduating from the University of Ceylon, he served as a tutor until he joined the Central Bank of Ceylon in 1952 and was appointed director of Economic Research in 1975. In 1978, he was appointed Senior Deputy Governor of the Central Bank. From 1988 to 1992 he served as the governor of the Central Bank.

He was president of the Royal Asiatic Society (Sri Lanka Branch), Society for International Development (Sri Lanka Chapter), Sri Lanka Economic Association, and was the first editor of the Sri Lanka Economic Journal. He served in the board of governors of Trinity College and St Thomas Preparatory College. Karunatilake authored 17 books on economics and banking in Sri Lanka and more than 150 articles published in local and foreign journals.

== See also ==
- Central Bank of Sri Lanka
