= John Exter =

American economist (1910–2006)

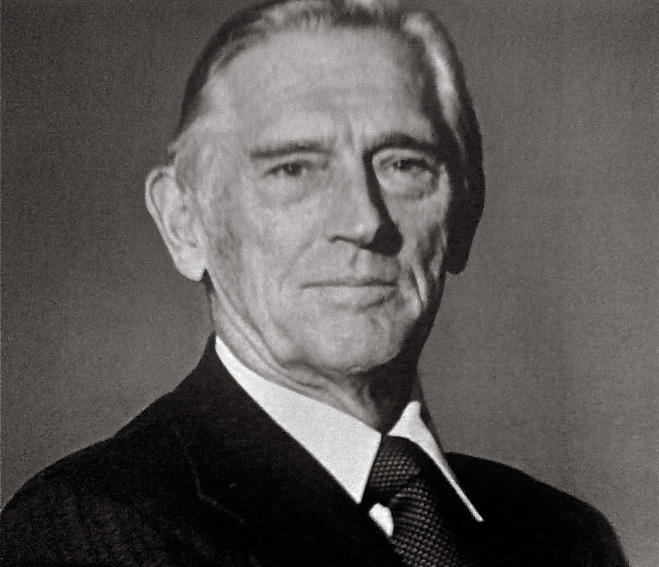
- Born: September 17, 1910
- Died: February 28, 2006 (aged 95)
- Education: College of Wooster; Fletcher School of Law & Diplomacy; Harvard University
- Occupation: Economist
- Notable work: Exter's Pyramid

John Exter was an American economist, member of the Board of Governors of the United States Federal Reserve System, and founder of the Central Bank of Sri Lanka. He is also known for creating Exter's Pyramid.

== Life and career ==
Exter was born in 1910 and graduated from the College of Wooster (1928–1932). He then went to the Fletcher School of Law & Diplomacy and in 1939, to Harvard University for graduate work in economics because of his interest in understanding the causes of the Great Depression.

After a stint at the Massachusetts Institute of Technology during World War II, Exter joined the Board of Governors of the Federal Reserve System as an economist. In 1948 he served first as adviser to the Secretary of Finance of the Philippines and then to the Minister of Finance of Ceylon (now Sri Lanka) on the establishment of central banks.

Between 1950 and 1953, Exter was the founder governor of the Central Bank of Ceylon. In 1953, he became the division chief for the Middle East at the International Bank for Reconstruction and Development. In 1954, the Federal Reserve Bank of New York appointed him vice president in charge of international banking and precious metals operations.

Exter left the New York Fed in 1959 to join First National City Bank (then the world's second largest bank) as a vice president. The next year he was promoted to senior vice president. As an international monetary adviser for the bank's International Banking Group he had special responsibilities for relations with foreign central banks and governments. In 1972 he took early retirement to become a private consultant.

Exter was a member of the Council on Foreign Relations, the Committee for Monetary Research & Education, the Mont Pelerin Society, and the Pilgrims of the United States.

He and his wife Marion had four children.

== Exter's Pyramid ==
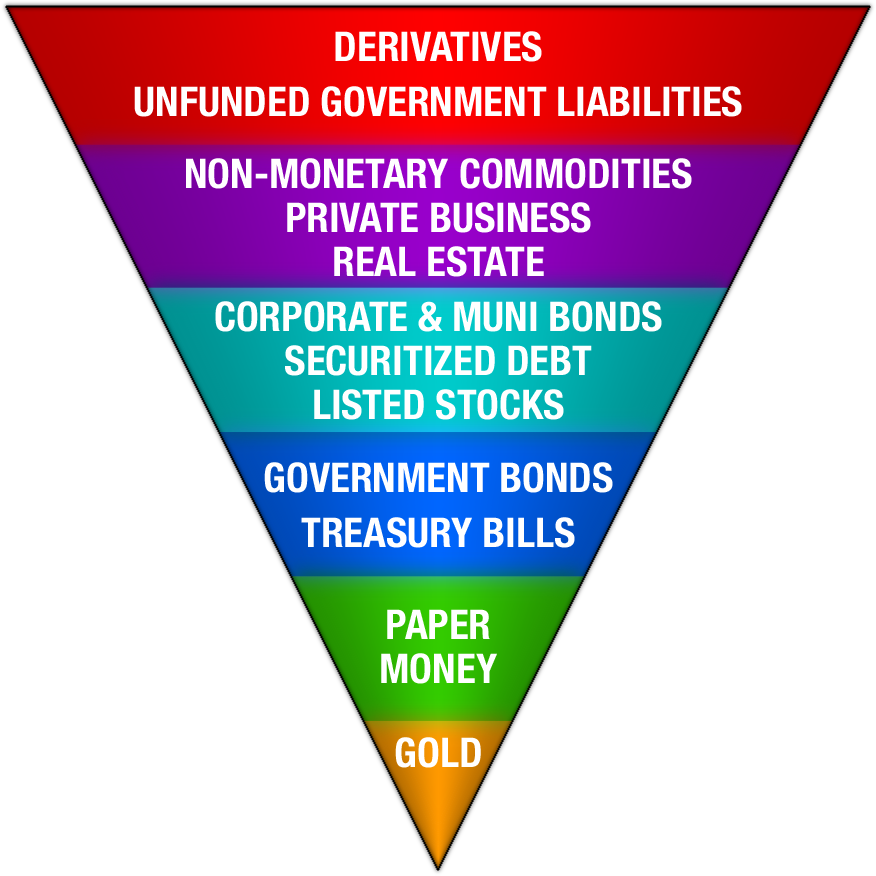
A modern adaptation of Exter's Pyramid

Exter is known for creating Exter's Pyramid (also known as Exter's Golden Pyramid and Exter's Inverted Pyramid) for visualizing the organization of asset classes in terms of risk and size. In Exter's scheme, gold forms the small base of most reliable value, and asset classes on progressively higher levels are more risky. The larger size of asset classes at higher levels is representative of the higher total worldwide notional value of those assets. While Exter's original pyramid placed Third World debt at the top, today derivatives hold this dubious honor.
