= Central Bank of Sri Lanka =

Monetary authority and regulator of all licensed banks of Sri Lanka

Central Bank of Sri Lanka ශ්‍රී ලංකා මහ බැංකුව (Sinhala) இலங்கை மத்திய வங்கி (Tamil)

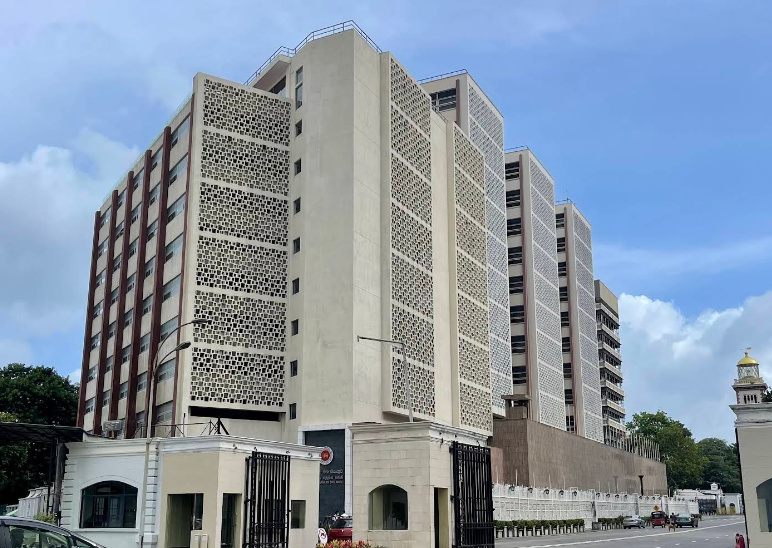
- Headquarters: Colombo
- Coordinates: 6.93399°N 79.84225°E
- Established: 28 August 1950; 75 years ago
- Governor: Dr. Nandalal Weerasinghe
- Central bank of: Sri Lanka
- Currency: Sri Lankan rupee LKR (ISO 4217)
- Reserves: US$6 billion
- Preceded by: Currency Board System
- Website: www.cbsl.gov.lk

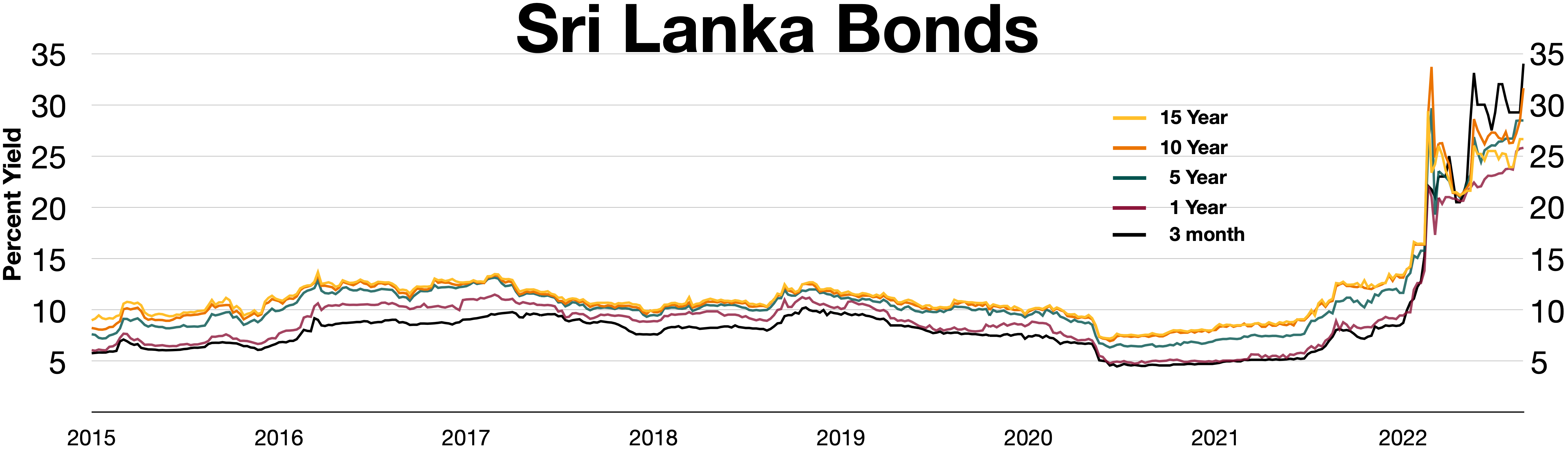
Sri Lanka bonds spiked in 2022 Inverted yield curve in the first half of 2022 during Sri Lankan economic crisis 15 year bonds 10 year bonds 5 year bonds 1 year bonds 6 month bonds

The Central Bank of Sri Lanka (abbr. CBSL; Sinhala: ශ්‍රී ලංකා මහ බැංකුව, romanized: Sri Lanka Maha Bankuwa), known until 1985 as the Central Bank of Ceylon, is the central bank of Sri Lanka. It was established in 1950 under the Monetary Law Act No.58 of 1949 (MLA) and in terms of the Central Bank of Sri Lanka Act No. 16 of 2023, the CBSL is a body corporate with perpetual succession and a common seal. The Central Bank has administrative and financial autonomy. The CBSL has two main boards in operation, namely, the Governing Board (GB) and the Monetary Policy Board (MPB).

== History ==
The Central Bank of Sri Lanka was established in 1950, two years after independence, succeeding the prior Board of Commissioners of Currency of Ceylon. The founder governor of the Central Bank of Sri Lanka was John Exter, while the minister of finance at the time was J. R. Jayewardene. Under the former name of Central Bank of Ceylon, it replaced the Currency Board that until then had been responsible for issuing the country's money. It is a member of the Asian Clearing Union.

The bank's main tasks are the conduct of monetary policy in Sri Lanka and also has wide supervisory powers over the financial system.

The bank is engaged in developing policies to promote financial inclusion and is a member of the Alliance for Financial Inclusion (AFI).

With a view to encouraging and promoting the development of the productive resources of Sri Lanka, the CBSL is responsible for securing price stability and financial system stability. The CBSL is also responsible for currency issuance and management. In addition, the CBSL is the advisor on economic affairs as well as the banker to the Government of Sri Lanka (GOSL). On behalf of GOSL, the CBSL, as its agent, is responsible for four agency functions, viz. management of the Employees Provident Fund; management of the public debt of Sri Lanka; administration of the provisions of the Exchange Control Act; and administration of foreign and government-funded credit schemes for regional development.

In September 2023 following the Aragalaya revolution of the previous year, Sri Lanka passed a new Central Bank Act replacing the old Monetary Law Act (MLA) of 1949, granting the CBSL significantly greater independence.

== Organisational structure ==
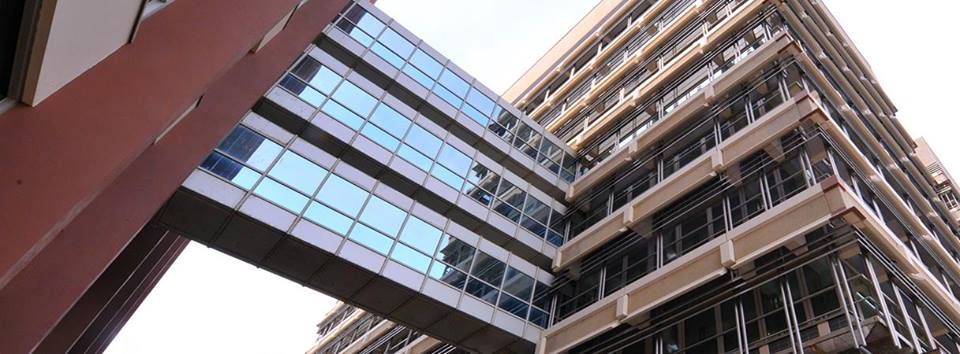
Central Bank of Sri Lanka Building

The Governor of the CBSL functions as its chief executive officer. The Governor, Deputy Governors and Assistant Governors, along with the Heads of Departments, form the senior management of the CBSL. Functionally, the CBSL presently consists of 29 departments, each headed by a Director (or equivalent), reporting to the Governor or the Deputy Governor through an Assistant Governor, with the exception of the Management Audit Department, which reports directly to the governor. The Economic Research and Bank Supervision Departments were explicitly set up under the original legislation establishing the CBSL, with certain statutory functions. The Economic Research Department, headed by the Director of Economic Research/Chief Economist, is required to compile data and conduct economic research for the guidance of the Monetary Board and for the information of the public, while the Bank Supervision Department, headed by the Director of Bank Supervision, is required to engage in the continuous regulation and supervision of all banking institutions in Sri Lanka.

The current members of the Governing Board of the Central Bank of Sri Lanka are:

1. Hon. Dr P. Nandalal Weerasinghe (Governor) - Chairman
2. Vish Govindasamy - Appointed Member
3. Nihal Fonseka - Appointed Member
4. Dr. Ravi Rathnayake - Appointed Member
5. Anushka Wijesinha - Appointed Member
6. Rajeev Amarasuriya - Appointed Member
7. Maithri Evan Wickremesinghe, P.C. - Appointed Member

The current members of the Monetary Policy Board of the Central Bank of Sri Lanka are:

1. Hon. Dr P. Nandalal Weerasinghe (Governor) - Chairman
2. Vish Govindasamy - Appointed Member
3. Nihal Fonseka - Appointed Member
4. Dr. Ravi Rathnayake - Appointed Member
5. Anushka Wijesinha - Appointed Member
6. Dr.(Ms) Dushni Weerakoon - Appointed Member
7. Prof. Priyanga Dunusinghe - Appointed Member
8. Maithri Evan Wickremesinghe, P.C. - Appointed Member
9. Manil Jayesinghe - Appointed Member
10. Dr. C. Amarasekara - Deputy Governor
11. Mr. K G P Sirikumara - Deputy Governor

== Corporate Management ==
The corporate management of the Central Bank of Sri Lanka includes the Governor, Deputy Governors and Assistant Governors.

== Central Bank of Sri Lanka response to Cyclone Ditwah ==
In the aftermath of Cyclone Ditwah, the CBSL issued a directive on December 5, 2025 requiring licensed banks to provide temporary moratoria on loan repayments, waive penalty charges, and offer restructuring or new credit facilities to borrowers affected by the cyclone. The CBSL also instructed to Banks to submit monthly reports on the relief granted, enabling the CBSL to monitor implementation. The CBSL stated that these measures were intended to ease financial stress on affected borrowers while maintaining overall financial-system stability.

== See also ==
- Sri Lankan rupee
- GovPay
- Colombo Central Bank bombing
- Currency museum, Colombo
- Fintech Association of Sri Lanka
- List of central banks
- List of financial supervisory authorities by country
