= Visumpaya =

- Location within Greater Colombo
- Former names: Acland House

General information
- Location: Colombo, Sri Lanka
- Coordinates: 6°54′53″N 79°51′07″E
- Client: Government of Sri Lanka

Visumpaya, is an official residence of the Government of Sri Lanka. It is located in Lillie Street, Colombo, Sri Lanka. The house has been used as a residence for visiting heads of state and local government ministers.

In July 2023, government of Sri Lanka agreed to lease out this location to be developed as a hotel

== History ==
The colonial style two story bungalow was built as the Officer's mess of the Ceylon Rifle Regiment and was sold to the Colombo Commercial Company in the late nineteenth century, which was named as "Acland House" turned it into its head office in Colombo and later became the residence of its general manager. In 1971, the house was taken over by the government following the nationalization of the Colombo Commercial Company under the Business (Acquisition) Act No. 35 of 1971.

Thereafter the house was used by the government as quarters for senior government officials such as Colonel C. A. Dharmapala as Permanent Secretary of the Ministry of Defence from 1977 to 1983. In the late 1980s President Ranasinghe Premadasa refurbished the house with its large gardens to be used as the state guest house to host to official functions and visiting heads of state and government giving it the name Visumpaya. From the mid-1990s it became a ministerial residence. Anura Bandaranaike former Minister and Speaker of Parliament died while in residence at Visumpaya. It was used by D. M. Jayaratne, 14th Prime Minister of Sri Lanka as his official residence.

== See also ==
- Prime Minister's Office
- Temple Trees
