= Aragalaya =

Protests against the Sri Lankan government

- Part of the Sri Lankan economic crisis, the aftermath of the Sri Lanka civil war and Gen Z protests in Asia
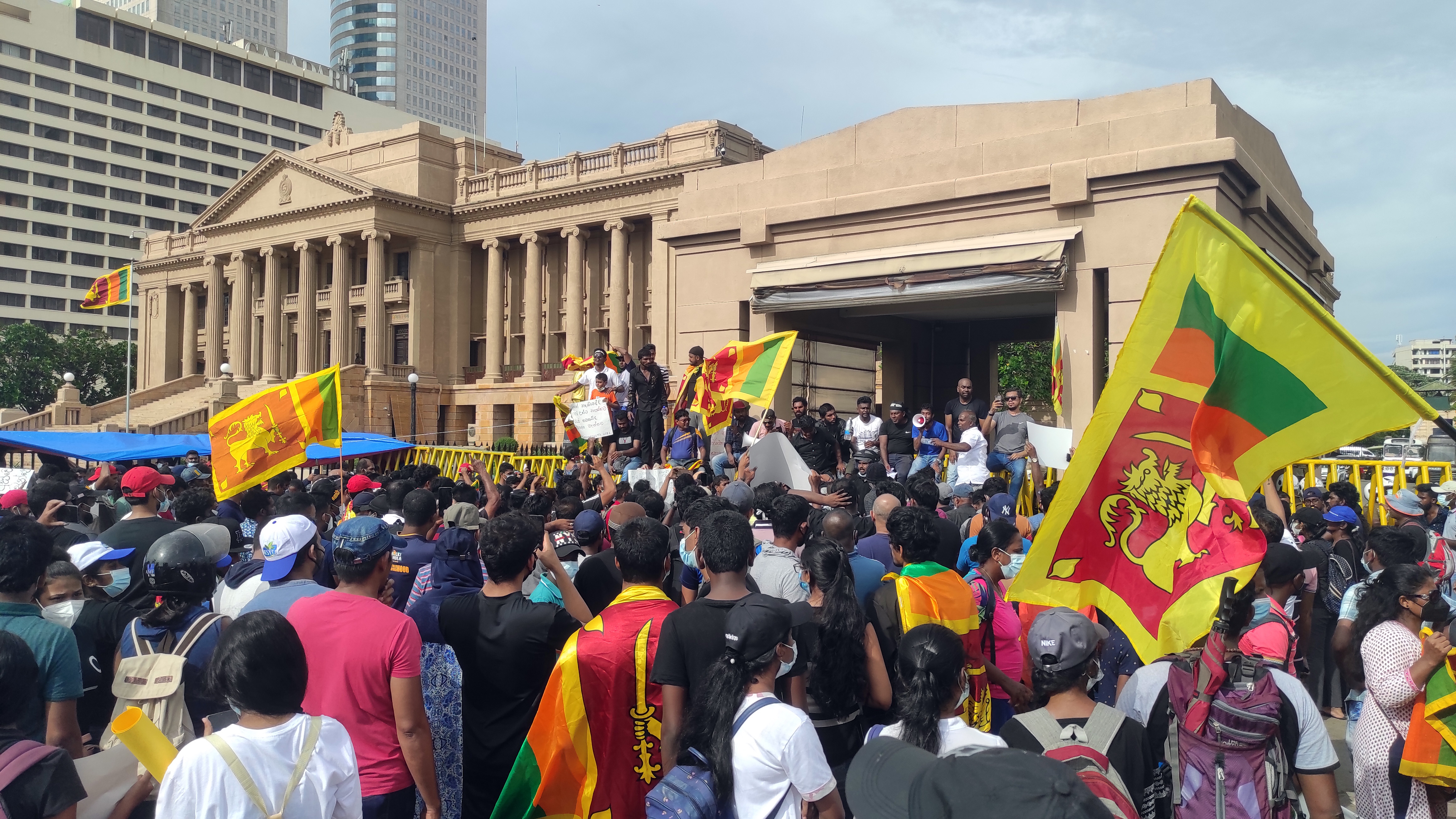
- Sri Lankans protesting in front of the Presidential Secretariat in Colombo on 13 April
- Date: 15 March 2022 – 14 November 2022 (7 months, 4 weeks and 2 days)
- Location: Sri Lanka
- Caused by: Economic mismanagement by the government resulting in the 2019–2024 Sri Lankan economic crisis; Shortages of fuel and essential items and power cuts; High inflation and the rapid rise in the cost of living; Authoritarianism, corruption and nepotism of the Rajapaksa family
- Goals: Resignation of Gotabaya Rajapaksa and the Rajapaksa administration; Drafting of a new constitution
- Methods: Political demonstrations, Internet activism, rioting, strike action, protests
- Result: Mass resignation of the Second Gotabaya Rajapaksa cabinet; Resignation of Central Bank Governor Cabraal and appointment of Weerasinghe; Over 50 MPs aligned with the SLPP government became independent in the Parliament; Series of coordinated attacks on protesters by pro-Rajapaksa mobs, triggering multiple retaliatory attacks by protesters on the property of Rajapaksa loyalists and other Parliament members; Resignation of Mahinda Rajapaksa as the Prime Minister and Wickremesinghe's appointment as his replacement; Resignation of MP Basil Rajapaksa; Gotabaya Rajapaksa resigns as President on 14 July and begins a self-exile, returns to Sri Lanka on 2 September; Ranil Wickremesinghe elected as President by Parliament on 20 July; Troops raid Galle Face and forcefully remove protesters from the Presidential Secretariat on 22 July; Dinesh Gunawardena appointed as Prime Minister on 22 July

Parties
(Sri Lanka) Protesters and opposition organizations: Many unorganized apolitical and nonpartisan protesters; University students; Various professions, including private bus drivers, fishermen, hospital workers, etc.; Buddhist, Christian, Islamic and Hindu clergies; Military veterans, including disabled war veterans; Sri Lankan diaspora mainly in Australia, United Kingdom, New Zealand and United States; Political parties; National People's Power; Samagi Jana Balawegaya; Tamil National Alliance; Frontline Socialist Party; Black Cap Movement	Government of Sri Lanka: Sri Lanka Police; Sri Lanka Army; Sri Lanka Podujana Peramuna; United National Party; Pro-Rajapaksa partisans; Avant-Garde PMC

Lead figures
Largely unorganized and decentralized leadership	Gotabaya Rajapaksa; Mahinda Rajapaksa; Ranil Wickremesinghe; Dinesh Gunawardena

Casualties and losses
10 protesters dead, (Note: 3 shot dead by police, 1 shot dead by MP Athukorala, 2 died of other causes); 250+ injured 600+ arrested	MP Athukorala and his security officer killed Chairman A.V. Sarath Kumara killed 1 policeman killed, 24 injured 10+ arrested including MP Sanath Nishantha, MP Milan Jayathilaka

The Aragalaya (Sinhala: අරගලය, lit. 'The Struggle') were a series of mass protests that began in March 2022 against the government of Sri Lanka. The government was heavily criticized for mismanaging the Sri Lankan economy, which led to a subsequent economic crisis involving severe inflation, daily blackouts, and a shortage of fuel, domestic gas, and other essential goods. The protesters' main demand was the resignation of President Gotabaya Rajapaksa and key officials from the Rajapaksa family. Despite the involvement of several opposition parties, most protesters considered themselves to be apolitical, with many expressing discontent with the parliamentary opposition. Protesters chanted slogans such as "Go Home Gota", "Go Home Rajapaksas", and "Aragalayata Jaya Wewa" ("Victory to the struggle"). Most protests were organized by the general public, with youths playing a major part by carrying out protests at Galle Face Green.

The government reacted to the protests with authoritarian methods, such as declaring a state of emergency, allowing the military to arrest civilians, imposing curfews, and restricting access to social media. The government violated the law and the Sri Lankan constitution by attempting to suppress the protests. The Sri Lankan diaspora also began demonstrations against the suppression of basic human rights in the country. In April, the government's ban on social media was perceived to have backfired; hashtags such as #GoHomeGota, which is believed to have been coined by an activist called Pathum Kerner in December 2021, had begun trending on Twitter internationally. The government's ban was lifted later that day. The Human Rights Commission of Sri Lanka condemned the government's actions and summoned officials responsible for the blocking and abuse of protesters.

On 3 April, all 26 members of the Second Gotabaya Rajapaksa cabinet resigned with the exception of Prime Minister Mahinda Rajapaksa. Critics said that the resignation was not valid as they did not follow constitutional protocol and several of the ministers who "resigned" were reinstated in different ministries the next day. Chief government whip Johnston Fernando insisted that President Gotabaya Rajapaksa would not resign under any circumstances. The protests, however, led to the removal of officials and ministers, including members of the Rajapaksa family and their close associates, and to the appointment of more qualified and veteran officials and the creation of the Advisory Group on Multilateral Engagement and Debt Sustainability.

In July 2022, protesters occupied the President's House in Colombo, causing Rajapaksa to flee and Prime Minister Ranil Wickremesinghe to announce his own willingness to resign. About a week later, on 20 July, Parliament elected Wickremesinghe as President. By November 2022, the protests had largely cooled off due to improvement in economic conditions. While the protests were mostly over, it was noted that it would take until 2026 for full economic recovery to be achieved.

== Background ==
Primary opponents of the Aragalaya

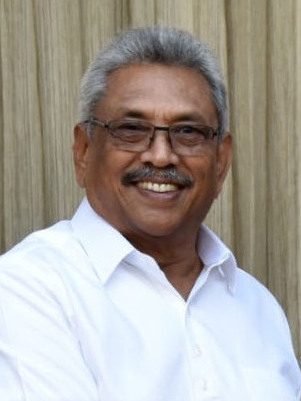
Incumbent President Gotabaya Rajapaksa

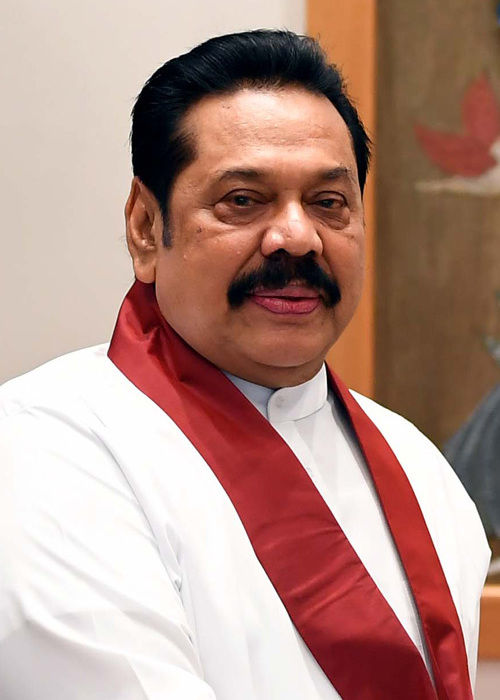
Incumbent Prime Minister Mahinda Rajapaksa

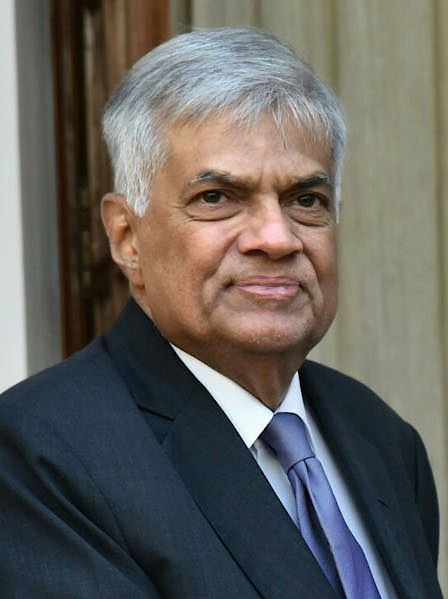
Former Prime Minister
Ranil Wickremesinghe (Note: Installed as Prime Minister by Gotabaya Rajapaksa after the resignation of Mahinda. Served as acting President from 13 July 2022 and later elected as the 9th President by the Parliament after Gotabaya's resignation.)

Sri Lanka had witnessed a sharp rise in foreign debt since 2010, reaching 42.6% of the country's GDP in 2019. By February 2022, the country had only $2.31 billion left in its reserves to repay around $4 billion of debt, including a $1 billion maturing international sovereign bond (ISB) in July. According to official data released by the Sri Lankan government, ISBs accounted for almost half of the country's external debt by the end of April 2022. The Asian Development Bank (13%), Japan (10%) and China (10%) were among the other major lenders.

Sri Lanka's economic crisis was further accelerated by global impacts including the global recession caused by the start of the COVID-19 pandemic in 2020, and the food and energy shortage and price hike following Russia's invasion of Ukraine in early 2022. An unsuccessful move to prohibit the use of synthetic fertilizer and pesticides also contributed to a major decline in the yields of Sri Lanka's rice and tea industries, which are, respectively, a staple food and major international export. The drop in tea production from the fertilizer ban alone resulted in economic losses of around $425 million. The ban also contributed to a 20% drop in rice production within the first six months. As a result, Sri Lanka went from being self-sufficient in rice production to having to import rice at a cost of US$450 million.

By 2021, the foreign debt had risen to 101% of the nation's GDP. The incumbent Government of Sri Lanka under president Gotabaya Rajapaksa made continuous cascading policy errors that resulted in a severe economic crisis for Sri Lanka. These included significant tax cuts that affected fiscal policies, and reduced government revenue, which intensified the budget deficit as well as inflation. To cover government spending, the Central Bank began printing money in record amounts, ignoring the International Monetary Fund's (IMF) advice to increase interest rates and taxes while decreasing spending instead. The IMF warned that continued money printing would lead to an economic implosion.

Instead, the country pursued an economic policy that kept exports low and imports high, which depleted the country's foreign currency reserves. According to the government, Sri Lanka's tourist trade, a major source of foreign currency for the country, was affected by both the COVID-19 pandemic and a series of terrorist attacks in 2019 that scared off tourists.

With brothers Basil Rajapaksa as finance minister and Mahinda Rajapaksa as prime minister, the sense of nepotism and mismanagement deepened among critics. While members of the Rajapaksa family had previously been charged with corruption locally, authorities have failed to prove these charges in court. In 2021, the International Consortium of Investigative Journalists released the Pandora Papers, which included information about Nirupama Rajapaksa, who had used offshore shell companies and trusts to secretly stash the family's wealth around the world. In 2022, as protests began growing in Sri Lanka, Jaliya Wickramasuriya, former Sri Lankan ambassador to the United States and Mexico, and a cousin of the Rajapaksa brothers, pleaded guilty in U.S. District Court for defrauding $332,027 from the Sri Lankan government during the purchase of a new embassy building in 2013. Government supporters and allies also began to blame the economic crisis on Basil Rajapaksa, who gained a reputation as "Mr. Ten Percent" due to his alleged commission from government contracts. Additionally, despite being the finance minister, he did not attend parliament sessions during the economic crisis. Udaya Gammanpila, the leader of the government-aligned Pivithuru Hela Urumaya, claimed that the party has no intention of re-electing a Rajapaksa, which would end of the nepotism that has plagued Sri Lankan politics.

== Timeline ==
=== March ===
Initial protests began in early March with small candlelight vigils, including notable gatherings in Kohuwala led by activists like Vimukthi Dushantha. These protests quickly spread countrywide, amassing increasing numbers of attendees. As protests began to grow, government MPs refused to acknowledge them, fueling the rapid growth of unorganized, non-partisan demonstrations where hundreds of citizens would gather after work to voice their dissent.

On 15 March, tens of thousands of supporters of the largest opposition party, the Samagi Jana Balawegaya (SJB) led by Sajith Premadasa, carried out protests in front of the President's office, demanding that the President resign. On 30 March, Mahinda Rajapaksa's son Namal Rajapaksa arrived for the opening ceremony of a sports ground in Bandarawela. During the opening, locals blocked the road and demanded fuel. This resulted in Rajapaksa avoiding the area and the mayor opening the grounds instead.

On Thursday, 31 March, hundreds of protesters held a demonstration at Pangiriwatte Road, Mirihana, where the president's private residence was situated. The silent candlelight protest initially started at the Jubilee Post Junction, only a few hundred meters away from the President's private residence. Later, as more people gathered, protesters began marching towards his residence. Hundreds of people swarmed the President's house throughout the night, demanding his resignation. The protest was initially spontaneous and peaceful until the police attacked the protesters with tear gas and water cannons. Protesters then set fire to two military buses and a police jeep, threw stones at officers, and blocked Colombo's main highway by burning tires. The curfew imposed on Thursday night was lifted on Friday morning, but police and army reinforcements in the city increased. The protest was broadcast live by a private television channel but the broadcast was halted due to what journalists described as pressure from the government. Official sources said that Rajapaksa was not present in the house during the protest.

A statement from the president's office the next morning said, "Thursday night's protests are being led by extremist forces who are inviting the Arab Spring to destabilize the country." The Samagi Jana Balawegaya accused the government of sending loyalists to infiltrate and sabotage the protests by burning vehicles and initiating acts of violence. They also disputed the government's claims that the protesters were armed, as videos of the event did not show armed protesters. Nearly 50 people, including journalists, were injured and hospitalized during the protest, and 45 people were arrested. The day following the protest saw over 300 lawyers at the Mirihana police station volunteering to represent the arrested protesters pro bono.

=== April ===
On 1 April, Shashseendra Rajapaksa, nephew of former President Mahinda Rajapaksa, was forced to avoid a ceremony in Wellawaya due to protesters waving black flags. Chamara Sampath Dassanayake attended the ceremony in his place but had to change vehicles and flee due to protesters pelting him with eggs. The same day, the Samagi Vanitha Balawegaya, headed by the SJB politician and former parliamentarian Hirunika Premachandra, staged a march from Point Pedro in Jaffna in protest of the economic hardships faced by the public. During the protest, Hirunika was reportedly involved in a heated exchange with political activist Arun Siddharth. The situation in the area later became tense and police officers intervened.

The Catholic Bishops' Conference of Sri Lanka requested that political leaders save the country from becoming a failed state, while Gnanartha Pradeepaya, a Catholic weekly, blamed the situation on corruption, which had forced the country to borrow money to buy essential items. Cardinal Malcolm Ranjith blamed the situation on political leaders and "us [sic] citizens who have allowed ourselves to be used by vested political and cultural interests in choosing the persons to whom we have entrusted the country and its destiny over all these years". The US citizens referred to in the statement were the President, who had to forfeit his dual citizenship to become the president, and his brother Basil Rajapaksa, the Finance Minister. The Cardinal also condemned the government's classification of protesters as "extremists" and "terrorists" as not being empathetic to the pain and fear of the people.

==== Declaration of state of emergency ====
On 1 April, President Gotabaya Rajapaksa declared a nationwide public emergency. However, protests persisted as private bus drivers in Anuradhapura, carpenters in Moratuwa and fishermen in Galle joined demonstrations. A 36-hour island-wide curfew was imposed from 6:00 pm on 2 April until 6:00 am on 4 April. The move was intended to prevent or at least minimize new protests. The sudden announcement of a curfew resulted in panic buying, which created long lines of people outside supermarkets and pharmacies. Many began chanting anti-government slogans. People who came to work from distant areas were unable to return to their homes, forcing some to sleep on the streets.

Celebrities also joined in the condemnation of the government, with Roshan Mahanama accusing "incompetent power-hungry rulers" of creating an economic depression. Other Sri Lankan cricketers, including Kumar Sangakkara, Mahela Jayawardene, Sanath Jayasuriya, Arjuna Ranatunga, Bhanuka Rajapaksa, Wanindu Hasaranga, Dimuth Karunaratne, Angelo Mathews, Muttiah Muralitharan, Rangana Herath, Dhammika Prasad and Marvan Atapattu, also took to social media and online forums to express support of and advocate for the rights of the public during the crisis. Sanath Jayasuriya, Roshan Mahanama and Marvan Atapattu, all holding placards, were among those who physically attended protests. Hirunika Premachandra led a group of women in a march toward the residence of popular fortune teller Gnana Akka (Gnanakka) in Anuradhapura. Premachandra and the other women protested in front of Gnanakka's shrine, but police blocked them from entering it.

Thisara Anuruddha Bandara, the social media activist who was arrested by the police on 2 April and held in police custody in Modara before being brought before a court. He was deemed to be in violation of section 120 of the Penal Code, which forbids criminal conspiracy. A riot also broke out in front of the residence of Saman Lal Fernando, Mayor of Moratuwa, a Colombo suburb that lies under the administrative province of Sri Lanka. Angry protesters threw stones at Fernando's residence, demanding electricity.

==== Social media blocks ====
On 3 April, the Telecommunications Regulatory Commission of Sri Lanka (TRCSL) announced that service providers had blocked social media platforms such as Facebook, WhatsApp, Instagram, Twitter, and YouTube due to a request from the Ministry of Defence. Oshada Senanayake, the Chairman of the Information and Communication Technology Agency of Sri Lanka, tendered his resignation amidst the social media blackout, stating that he was standing by his ethos and principles. The Public Utilities Commission of Sri Lanka (PUCSL) requested that the TRCSL and service providers immediately restore all social media platforms, as it prevented them from informing consumers about impending power cuts as electricity has been declared an essential service. The social media blackout ended 15 hours after it had started.

Multiple protests in violation of the curfew were reported. Sajith Premadasa, Sarath Fonseka and Patali Champika Ranawaka led an SJB-affiliated protest in Colombo where they were blocked by the police. A protest led by the students of the University of Peradeniya in Kandy was dispersed after the police used water cannons and tear gas.

==== Cabinet resignation ====
On 3 April, several Rajapaksa cabinet ministers submitted their resignations. Those who resigned included Namal Rajapaksa, who had criticized the social media blackout. Two ministers from the Rajapaksa family, Chamal Rajapaksa and Basil Rajapaksa, also resigned. The president was to announce the new cabinet the following day.

However, the opposition noted that Article 47(2)(a) of the Constitution required that resignations be submitted to the president. The resignations in this case were submitted to the prime minister instead, which voided their validity. The opposition also denied that they would join an interim government, as it was not practical to join a government under President Rajapaksa without the parliamentary majority needed to pass substantial economic reforms. Despite this, on 4 April, President Rajapaksa reshuffled the ministerial portfolios by swearing-in Ali Sabry as finance minister, G. L. Peiris as foreign minister, Dinesh Gunawardena as education minister, and Johnston Fernando as minister of highways. Protests continued on 4 April, including one on the Tangalle-Kataragama Main Road close to the Carlton House in Tangalle, the residence of the Rajapaksa family. President Rajapaksa invited the opposition to join his proposed unity government to find a solution to the crisis. The governor of the Central Bank of Sri Lanka, Ajith Nivard Cabraal, also resigned as a result of growing public anger.

The swearing-in of the same ministers from the former cabinet caused protests to intensify, leading protesters to surround the houses of government MPs such as Keheliya Rambukwella, Gamini Lokuge, Ramesh Pathirana, Kanchana Wijesekera, Roshan Ranasinghe, Nimal Lanza, and Janaka Bandara Tennakoon. Protesters surrounded Douglas Devananda's office in Jaffna while he was in the building. Despite police firing tear gas to disperse the protesters, some succeeded in storming and vandalising the residence of Roshan Ranasinghe. Protesters also began to demand the arrest of the Rajapaksas and the recuperation of stolen wealth.

In a phone interview with News First, former Central Bank Deputy Governor Nandalal Weerasinghe revealed that Gotabaya Rajapaksa had offered him the post of Governor of the Central Bank of Sri Lanka, and admitted to accepting the position. He assumed his duties as Governor on 7 April.

Catholic clergy led by Cardinal Malcolm Ranjith protested against the government from Archbishop's House in Colombo, whilst Buddhist clergy from Buddhasravaka Bhiksu University protested in Anuradhapura. The hospital staff of the Kalubowila Teaching Hospital also protested against the government.

==== Reconvening of Parliament ====
On 5 April, Parliament reconvened for the first time since the state of emergency began and was set to discuss the current state of affairs. The Sri Lanka Podujana Peramuna-ruled (SLPP) government began losing the support of its key allies: 9 SLPP MPs decided to defect from the government and to work as independent MPs, while the Sri Lanka Freedom Party (SLFP), the Ceylon Workers' Congress (CWC) and the All Ceylon Makkal Congress (ACMC) left the government and moved into opposition. Large numbers of protesters assembled in front of Parliament, demanding that the entire cabinet resign and chanting the slogans "Gota Go Home" and "Go Home Rajapaksas". During the protest, six armed masked men in military attire, later revealed to be from the Army, arrived on motorcycles without registration plates. However, the police stopped and questioned them, taking the keys to the motorcycles. The Chief of Defence Staff and Commander of the Army General Shavendra Silva called the police actions "unethical and ill-mannered behaviour".

On 5 April, the Government Medical Officers Association and government doctors staged protests against the government, and the Government Medical Officers' Association declared a national health emergency due to the limited supply of essential medicines.

Some young protesters who could not receive parental permission to join the street protests vented their frustration by vandalizing the Wikipedia articles of politicians such as Ajith Nivard Cabraal, Basil Rajapaksa, and Namal Rajapaksa.

Gotabaya Rajapaksa revoked the state of emergency on 5 April, effective at midnight.

On 8 April, police used tear gas to disperse a group of university students who had protested at Polduwa junction in Battaramulla. Several IT professionals also gathered in large numbers and protested at the Liberty Roundabout, close to the Liberty Plaza Complex in Colombo. A few Rajapaksa supporters carried out protests in Colombo in support of Gotabaya Rajapaksa by chanting the slogan "We Want Gota".

On 9 April, massive protests occurred in Colombo; the protesters included members of the LGBT community, trade unions, the Buddhist clergy and the Muslim community. Students from private and state universities also collaborated for a combined protest march when the students protested in Nugegoda.

==== "Occupy Galle Face" ====
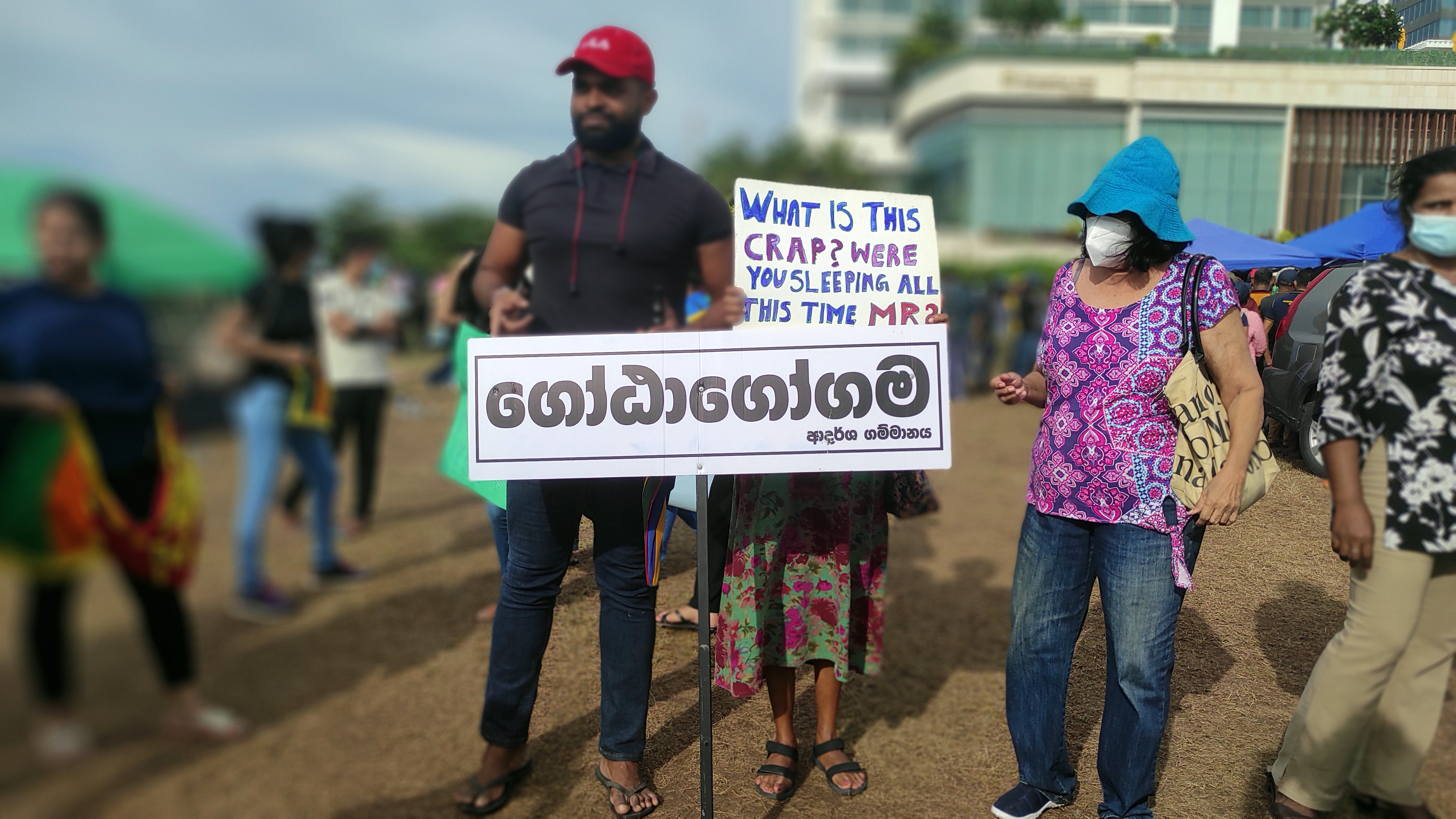
People taking selfies in Gotagogama.

On 9 April 2022, protestors planned large demonstrations, protests, and rallies in the Galle Face Green against the government. However, the authorities closed the Galle Face Green, citing land development. Despite this, tens of thousands of people gathered in large numbers and joined the protests in Galle Face, making it one of the largest street protests in Sri Lanka. People continued protesting from morning until night, standing for hours holding placards, even in inclement weather. They faced internet outages and loss of mobile signal due to the installation of a mobile phone jammer at the Galle Face, which made it difficult for protesters to conduct Facebook Livestreams and send messages on social media. The protests continued outside of the Presidential Secretariat, with people refusing to leave the Galle Face until the President resigned. On 9 April, #OccupyGalleFace began trending on Twitter. The protestors also began using "Occupy Galle Face" as a slogan for their protests at Galle Face. Placards included the phrases "This is our country, not your ATM", "Country is for sale, Gota fail", "Give us our stolen money back", "If you steal our dreams, we won't let you sleep", and "Audit all politicians immediately".

Protesters dubbed the protesting area Gotagogama, meaning the "Gota Go Village". It was initially set up by volunteers on the night of 9 April with a handful of tents. Within 24 hours, the number of tents had grown to 24 and portable toilet facilities, three for men and three for women, had been installed. Similar to the Occupy Wall Street movement, Gotagogama was set up like a small model village, providing basic necessities, including free food, water, and toilets, as well as limited free emergency medical services. Meanwhile, youth protestors created an improvised settlement in front of the president's house. Protestors in both camps made sure to clean up garbage in their areas every night. On Facebook, the hashtag #GoHomeGota2022 reached 1 million posts and had been trending on Twitter for the third consecutive week. There were multiple protests paralleling the one at Galle Face all across the island.

Protests continued on 10 and 11 April despite the heavy rain and thunderstorms. Moments after performing Bob Marley's Get up, Stand up to entertain the protesters at Galle Face, rapper Shiraz Rudebwoy had a sudden heart attack and collapsed. He was pronounced dead during the ambulance ride to the hospital. This marked the first reported death directly linked to the Galle Face protests.

On 12 April, protests continued for the fourth day. Celebrities such as Nanda Malini, Sunil Ariyaratne, Swarna Mallawarachchi and Buddhadasa Galappatti joined the protests in Galle Face to support the young protesters' efforts to dethrone the government from power. The sixth consecutive day of protests fell on the Sinhalese New Year (Puthandu). Protestors gathered in large numbers to boil milk rice and to share sweet meats and oil cakes. They welcomed the New Year by setting off firecrackers and chanting phrases such as "Victory to the People's struggle" and sang Raban tune songs as part of New Year customs and traditions.

Victor Ratnayake joined the protests on the New Year to support the protesters, as did veterans, including those disabled in the field. Many protesters boycotted New Year's vacation and holiday celebrations by joining the protests and demonstrations against the government. Several protesters, including infants and small children, were seen wearing headbands with slogans such as "Go Home Gota" and "Gota Go Home". On 13 April, Mahinda Rajapaksa made a request to meet a delegate from the protesters in Galle Face but was refused.

Conspiracy theories began spreading on 14 April 2022. On its official Twitter, SriLankan Airlines claimed that they had made history by operating three successive cargo charter flights to Entebbe International Airport in Uganda. The cargo was 102 metric tonnes of printed material which had been moved in February 2021, though details about the contents of the papers were withheld by SriLankan Airlines due to confidentiality. They later deleted the tweet for unknown reasons before issuing a clarification that the material sent to Uganda included only Ugandan currency notes. They claimed that due to conflicts with bordering Kenya, the Ugandan government preferred to obtain printed Ugandan shilling notes from a global security printer. The Biyagama branch of the De La Rue company is responsible for printing currency notes to countries, including Uganda. SriLankan Airlines insisted that the consignment was purely commercial in nature and brought much-needed foreign currency revenue to the airline and, by extension, the country. Mahinda Rajapaksa reportedly maintained close ties with Uganda, especially during his second tenure as president from 2010 to 2015. He also befriended Sri Lankan High Commissioner to Uganda, Velupillai Kananathan, during Rajapaksa's first official presidential trip to Uganda in 2014. Uganda has been blacklisted by many international financial systems for failing to comply with anti-money laundering laws and for continuously engaging in various financial crimes. The news that Uganda was going to be blacklisted due to money laundering went viral in Sri Lanka among protesters and social media users, who speculated that Rajapaksa family members and influential politicians in the government could have possibly transferred ill-gotten wealth to Uganda on cargo flights via the SriLankan Airlines flight.

A police officer attached to the Kuttigala Police Station who joined the Galle Face protests on 14 April in police uniform was taken into custody and was questioned by the Police Special Investigations Unit. The following day, he was granted bail by the Fort Magistrate's Court as several lawyers were present on behalf of the police sergeant when he was produced before the courts.

On 15 April 2022, former Sri Lankan cricketer Dhammika Prasad went on a hunger strike for 24 hours, urging the leaders of Sri Lanka to give justice to the Easter Sunday attack victims and to take immediate measures to ease the burden of the economic crisis on the population. Arjuna Ranatunga and Sidath Wettimuny joined the Galle Face protests, especially to support their former teammate Prasad. Sanath Jayasuriya and a group of Indigenous Vedda people also joined the fray. The campaign hashtag #GoHomeGota2022 reached 3 million posts on 15 April, three days after passing 2 million posts. A new branch of the Gotagogama was started in Galle. However, tensions arose at the new campsite when police officers attempted to discard the temporary tents. Removed tents were later restored after lawyers intervened. The Human Rights Commission of Sri Lanka subsequently ordered a complete investigation regarding the removal of the tents.

On the morning of 16 April, a convoy of riot police trucks was placed on the outskirts of Galle Face. The trucks concerned protesters, leading to speculation on social media that there would be a crackdown from the government. The convoy was later removed from the site after the Bar Association of Sri Lanka (BASL) intervened. The BASL also requested that the government refrain from oppressing protesters and urged them to respect the legitimate exercise of the freedom of dissent of the people.

On 17 April 2022, the protests continued for the ninth consecutive day. Protesters sang the national anthem of Sri Lanka in both Sinhala and Tamil, to show solidarity and unity among the various people of the multicultural society of Sri Lanka. They commemorated the 2019 Easter Sunday bombings, where 258 people were killed, and demanded justice for its victims. The Human Rights Commission of Sri Lanka also visited the Gotagogama premises to inspect the protests following reports that police officers were attempting to disperse the peaceful protests with violence. That night, the Presidential Secretariat building was illuminated with colorful themes and illusions of 3D art graphics using projectors and video projector mapping technology with the slogan "Go Home Gota". Police officers attempted to prevent the projections. Some media outlets, including TV Derana and its sister channel Ada Derana, termed the peaceful protests as a "beach party", a description which was ill-received by protesters and critics, including human rights lawyer Ambika Satkunanathan. The 12th episode of Ada Derana's State of the Nation, which aired that day, alleged that the protests were funded by terrorist organizations and hackers. Ada Derana TV host Mahieash Jonny resigned the following day and Derana stated that his opinions did not represent the network's beliefs.

On 19 April 2022, the Federation of University Teachers' Association (FUTA) engaged in a protest march from University of Colombo to Galle Face. One lane of the Galle Road leading to the Presidential Secretariat from Kollupitiya junction was blocked by university lecturers who gathered in large numbers holding placards. Actor Jehan Appuhami began a symbolic walk from St. Sebastian's Church, Katuwapitiya in Negombo to St. Anthony's Shrine in Kochchikade by carrying a large wooden cross on his back to symbolize the search for truth and justice for the Easter attack victims. The walk ended at Galle Face. British-based actor Hiran Abeysekera arrived in Sri Lanka to join the protests.

On 24 April, thousands of Inter University Students' Federation members surrounded the PM's residence and demanded the current regime to resign.

On 29 April, the protestors blindfolded the statue of former Prime Minister of Ceylon, S. W. R. D. Bandaranaike, who was known for championing the controversial and infamous Sinhala Only Act in 1956.

In May, on its official Twitter account, Daily Mirror shared that an unnamed leading telecommunications company had installed a telephone tower to send and enhance signals at the Gotagogama site. It was later confirmed that Dialog Axiata had installed the 20 ft (6m) signal tower at Galle Face to combat network congestion. The company later decided to disable the tower out of respect for protesters concerned about digital privacy issues, with some alleging that their personal data would be compromised and they would be tracked by the government.

On 3 May, Ramadan Eid-Ul-Fitr Festival was celebrated at the Gotagogama site at Galle Face with the participation of several religious leaders, including Buddhist monks and Christian priests. Protesters shared Sawans with biriyani in celebration and members of the Sri Lankan Muslim Civil Society donated 700 lunch parcels to Gotagogama on the eve of Ramadan.

==== Mynagogama ====
The Mynagogama protest site was set up on the Galle Road entrance to Temple Trees, the Prime Minister's official residence, inspired both by Gotagogama and by Mahinda Rajapaksa's new nickname "Myna" from the protestors. On 29 April, a protester was assaulted by a plainclothes police officer and was admitted to the Colombo National Hospital. Other reports of police officers attempting in incite violence by removing placards from police buses parked at Mynagogama were also made.

==== 19 April: Rambukkana incident ====
People who had been standing in long queues to obtain fuel for several hours began protesting at the Rambukkana Crossing by obstructing the railway tracks, blocking all entry and exit roads to Rambukkana for over 15 hours. The police arrived and fired tear gas and live bullets to disperse them. According to a police spokesperson, the officers began to fire in order to control the situation after the protesters threw rocks and attempted to set fire to a fuel bowser and a three-wheeler. This justification for the use of live ammunition was contradicted by protesters and videos that showed that the fuel truck was not threatened by protesters, who claimed the vehicles were set on fire by the police. Videos released by the protesters also showed that they were trying to put out fires in a fuel station. Witnesses to the incident claimed that the protesters were initially peaceful until the police arrived, and corroborated the claims that it was the police who set fire to the vehicles. A video clip of the incident showed that officers had also vandalized parked vehicles in the area. Several people were injured and rushed to the Kegalle Hospital for treatment. It was later confirmed that 12 people were injured and one person had died. A police curfew was imposed in the Rambukkana Police area with immediate effect.

According to the Bar Association of Sri Lanka, the police intimidated witnesses into providing false evidence. Kegalle Magistrate Wasana Nawaratne ordered the Inspector General of Police, C. D. Wickramaratne to arrest the officer who gave the orders to fire at protestors and other officers involved in the shooting.

==== 28 April: Island-wide token strike ====
On 28 April 2022, over 1000 trade unions conducted a massive island-wide, one-day token strike in support of the ongoing public protests against the government at the Viharamahadevi Park in Colombo. Unions representing banking, ports, education, health, plantations, railway and petroleum took part in the one-day strike.

=== May ===
==== HoruGoGama protests ====
'HoruGoGama' (Go Home Thieves Village) was established by protesters initially led by university students around the Sri Lankan Parliament building on 5 May. The protesters demanded the resignation of the entire parliament and demanded the Rajapaksa family return stolen money. Despite heavy rain, protesters surrounded the parliament and withstood tear gas. The police used water cannons to destroy tents and a food distribution stall and attempted to stop people from joining the protests by barricading the area. The protesters shouted insults at opposition MPs leaving the building and accused them of making deals with the government.

On 6 May 2022, President Gotabhaya Rajapaksa declared a second state of emergency, which was met with international condemnation. UNICEF expressed concern with reports of violence in protests involving children and cited the Convention on the Rights of the Child which support the right of children and adolescents to express their views. Canadian High Commissioner to Sri Lanka David McKinnon expressed surprise at the decision, claiming that "Sri Lankans have a right to peaceful protest under a democracy", and that it was "hard to understand why it is necessary, then, to declare a state of emergency". US ambassador to Sri Lanka Julie Chung claimed that the second state of emergency would not help and instead urged the government to listen to the public and seek long-term solutions. The European Union warned that a state of emergency "could have a counterproductive effect" on the protests, which the EU saw as peaceful.

The Rajapaksas also increasingly began to turn to supernatural and divine intervention to maintain power, with media reports of the president's personal shaman, Gnana Akka, sending charmed bottles of water to the protest site. Shiranthi Rajapaksa visited a Hindu temple seeking divine help for her family. Mahinda Rajapaksa visited Anuradhapura to seek blessings from the Sri Maha Bodhi but was booed and heckled by citizens while residents protested, demanding that "thieves" be banned from the city, which is considered holy by Buddhists.

==== Black Monday attacks on protesters ====
On 9 May 2022, SLPP members supporting Mahinda Rajapaksa arrived in buses at Temple Trees and staged a protest urging Rajapaksa not to resign; Rajapaksa then addressed the crowd. Moratuwa Mayor Saman Lal Fernando was in attendance, having taken eight busloads of municipal workers with him in support of Rajapaksa. Soon after, Rajapaksa loyalists attacked the Mynagogama site in front of Temple Trees, assaulting anti-government protesters before moving on to the larger Gotagogama protest site at Galle Face with little intervention from the police. The loyalists assaulted more protesters at Galle Face and destroyed many of the structures there. Over 130 people were wounded and hospitalized following the attacks. SDIG Deshabandu Tennakoon, who is in charge of the Western Province, was seen during the attack standing with SLPP MPs who supported the attacks made by the loyalists. It was later revealed that the Inspector General of Police (IGP) C. D. Wickramaratne ordered the police not to use force against Rajapaksa loyalists on instructions from Public Security Ministry Secretary (Retd.) Maj. Gen. Jagath Alwis. Police later intervened by using a water cannon and tear gas to disperse the two groups after President Rajapaksa ordered them to intervene. A police curfew was imposed in Colombo and was then extended across the island.

The Gotagogama in Kandy was simultaneously attacked. Videos showed government MPs such as Sanath Nishantha leading the attacks against protesters. The military was also deployed to the Gotagogama site at Galle Face following the attack perpetrated by loyalists on the peaceful protesters. As a result of the chaotic incident, the holidays for all ranks of police officers were cancelled with immediate effect and all officers were recalled to report on duty.

Rajapaksa loyalists also attacked nearby businesses that were selling flags to the protesters. They asked vendors whether they valued their children or their business more, then burnt down the shops. Many vendors were already suffering from the effects of the economic crisis and had bought goods to sell by taking debt. After several loyalists confessed to being prisoners, it was alleged that inmates of the Watareka Prison were brought by the Avant Garde PMC to carry out the attack. The government denied that the prisoners were provided to the attackers and claimed that buses carrying prisoners were simply caught up in the unrest. News First disputed the government's excuse and showed footage of attackers wearing clothing similar to those worn by the captured prisoners. The General Secretary of the Committee for Protecting Rights of Prisoners, Sudesh Nandimal de Silva, expressed concern over the allegations.

The attacks carried out by Rajapaksa loyalists triggered severe backlash in the country, with many calling it "state sponsored violence" and "state sponsored terrorism". Janatha Vimukthi Peramuna (JVP) leader Anura Kumara Dissanayake arrived at the scene with his supporters. SJB leader Sajith Premadasa was attacked by a group of protesters while he was walking in Galle Face following the eruption of violence and he was soon escorted out with the help of security guards. SJB MP Kumara Welgama who was travelling in a car was also assaulted by unidentified men.

Sri Lankan cricketers and celebrities condemned the assaults as thuggery. PM Mahinda Rajapaksa issued a statement condemning the violence. His tweet was quoted by Kumar Sangakkara, who added, "The only violence was perpetrated by your "supporters" – goons and thugs who came to your office first before going on to assault the peaceful protestors." Mahela Jayawardana also tweeted the fact that the thugs began attacking protesters after meeting Mahinda Rajapaksa and that the police did not take any action to stop them. Sanath Jayasuriya referred to the violence as the downfall of the Rajapaksas.

The attacks caused widespread retaliation and rioting against Rajapaksa loyalists. The buses that were carrying those that attacked the protesters were ambushed in various parts of the country and destroyed. Three pickup trucks and buses were pushed into the Beira Lake by protesters along with the attackers themselves. Houses and offices of SLPP politicians were torched, including that of Ramesh Pathirana, Sanath Nishantha, Nimal Lanza, Johnston Fernando, and Thushara Sanjeewa. The house of Sanath Nishantha, who led the attacks, was entirely burnt to the ground. The protesters also set ablaze the houses of the mayors of Moratuwa and Kurunegala, as both were deemed hardcore Rajapaksa supporters. Protestors in Maharagama forced a leader of a pro-Rajapaksa government group out of a bus and threw him into a garbage cart. The bus was later rammed by a bulldozer.

MP Amarakeerthi Athukorala reportedly shot several protesters who were gathered in Nittambuwa before he was forced to take refuge in a building after being surrounded by thousands of protestors. It was unclear if he allegedly died by suicide using his own firearm or was beaten to death by the protest mob. The Avenra Garden Hotel in Negombo, which was rumoured to belong to Rajapaksa's associates, was also burned down by the protestors and several vehicles at the hotel premises were destroyed by burning, including a Lamborghini Gallardo, a Ferrari 488 Spyder, a Cadillac stretch limousine, a Brabus G-class and a Hummer H2.

==== Resignation of Mahinda Rajapaksa ====
On 9 May 2022, Prime Minister Mahinda Rajapaksa tendered his resignation to the President. Rajapaksa was heavily criticised by citizens and the public for resigning after instigating violence against peaceful protestors. Despite this, retaliatory violence continued, with houses and offices of former government ministers being destroyed. Protestors also began targeting properties and monuments of the Rajapaksa family. The D. A. Rajapaksa Museum was burnt down, and a monument to D. A. Rajapaksa, the father of the ruling Rajapaksa brothers, was destroyed, while the wax statues of the Rajapaksa parents from the museum were flattened. The Rajapaksa family house in Medamulana as well as Mahinda Rajapaksa's house in Kurunegala were destroyed. Violent clashes occurred as protesters also attempted to storm Temple Trees and the Army and Navy were deployed. Protesters used police barricades as battering rams against the heavy iron gates while some managed to commandeer a police bus and used it as a battering ram. The government used tear gas and rubber bullets against the protestors.

Further Opposition MPs such as M. A. Sumanthiran (Tamil National Alliance) demanded the arrest of Ex-PM Mahinda Rajapaksa for his role in the mob attack against peaceful protestors. Former President Maithripala Sirisena also agreed that sending armed mobs to attack peaceful protestors should result in Rajapaksa and the leaders of the mob, including Johnston Fernando and Samanlal Fernando, being arrested. However, Wimal Weerawansa (Jathika Nidahas Peramuna) claimed that Fernando attacked the protestors under Basil Rajapaksa's orders and it is Fernando that should be arrested. Government MP Charitha Herath claimed that the attack was an attempt by Mahinda Rajapaksa to prove his power to President Rajapaksa by removing the protestors with his supporters, as the president was increasingly trying to sideline his brothers after realizing that they were taking advantage of his political inexperience.

By the morning of 10 May, security forces had managed to end the siege of Temple Trees and evacuated Mahinda Rajapaksa under high security. It was reported that Mahinda Rajapaksa and his family had fled to Trincomalee and were hiding at the naval base. Protestors gathered around the base, demanding that he be arrested for his crimes. That night, a mob supported by an area politician attacked residents' houses, accusing them of looting the Avendra Hotel. Several properties including shops were damaged and four people were injured.

The inability of the police to control the mass retaliatory violence on the politicians was blamed on the 20th Amendment to the Constitution, which removed the independence of the police commission, allowing SLPP politicians to interfere with the police appointments. This resulted in politicians taking control of transfers and appointments of officers. Thus, by the time the riots hit, almost all officers in charge of police stations across the country were those hand-picked by the local SLPP politicians. These hand-picked officers in charge ended up ignoring their immediate superiors and instead were taking orders from their patrons, resulting in widespread incompetence leading to a breakdown of law and order. Notable politicians that appointed their own officers in charge included Ramesh Pathirana and Rohitha Abeygunawardene, both of whom lost their homes. By contrast, the properties of politicians that lived in areas where officers were still appointed based on merit were saved, such as in Elpitiya, where the police managed to protect the house of ex-state minister Geetha Kumarasinghe. Many government MPs were angry that the army was used to protect the president's personal shaman Gnana Akka over them.

Another pro-government mob attempted to instigate violence against Muslims in an effort to create a racial tensions between them and the Sinhalese. Residents launched livestreams debunking the claims of tensions and residents expressed anger, claiming that an outside group was brought into town to incite violence. Religious leaders in Negombo also joined to oppose the violent mobs. Locals claimed that Rajapaksa loyalists were trying to create conflicts and requested religious leaders to remain vigilant. Catholic priests and nuns stayed until midnight to maintain peace and to defuse the situation.

==== Deployment of military ====
On 11 May, the government deployed the military with shoot-on-sight orders to bring the violence under control. The military was given the power to detain people without a warrant for up to 24 hours before handing them over to the police, and any private property could be searched by forces. Many expressed fears that the government was planning a military takeover and was preparing to declare martial law, but this was denied by defence officials. The decision to involve the military received international criticism, with the U.S. Department of State stressing that "peaceful protesters should never be subject to violence or intimidation, whether that's on the part of a military force or civilian units." It was suggested that the initial attacks by Rajapaksa loyalists on peaceful anti-government protesters "served [the] greater scheme of things" by allowing President Gotabaya Rajapaksa to call a state of emergency, which permitted "a more conspicuous use of the military to control public protesters under the pretext of law and order".

On 12 May, the Fort Magistrate's Court issued a travel ban on 17 individuals due to investigations of the attacks on the GotaGoGama and MynaGoGama peaceful protest sites. These include Mahinda Rajapaksa, Namal Rajapaksa, Pavithra Wanniarachchi, Johnston Fernando, Sanjeeva Edirimanna, Rohitha Abeygunawardena, C. B. Ratnayake, Sanath Nishantha, Kanchana Jayaratne, Chaminda Sampath, Mahinda Kahandagama, Renuka Perera, Nishantha Abeysinghe, Amitha Abeywickrama, Pushpalal Kumarasinghe, Dilip Fernando, Senior DIG Deshabandu Thennakoon and seven other witnesses and victims of the attacks essential for investigations.

==== Founding of No-Deal-Gama ====
On 13 May, the former MynaGoGama near Temple Trees was replaced with No-Deal-Gama. While the initial proposal was to establish a RanilGoGama against the appointment of Ranil Wickremesinghe as PM, protestors decided to name it No-Deal-Gama to emphasize opposition to making deals with the Rajapaksas rather than opposition to the new PM.

A personal complaint was lodged before the Colombo Magistrate's Court requesting the immediate arrest of seven people responsible for the 9 May attack under conspiracy to commit criminal intimidation and with aiding and abetting the attack in front of Temple Trees and Galle Face. These people included Mahinda Rajapaksa, Johnston Fernando, Sanjeewa Edirimanne, Sanath Nishantha and Saman Lal Fernando, Senior DIG in charge of the Western Province Deshabandu Tennakoon and IGP Chandana Wickremeratne.

On 18 May, the protestors at GotaGoGama held a remembrance event to honour all those who were killed or disappeared during the Sri Lankan Civil War which ended in 2009.

On 23 May, the government tabled the new 21st Amendment to the Constitution. This would revert most of the 20th Amendment which the protestors demanded be abolished due to the unlimited powers granted to the president. The Amendment also proposed re-empowering independent commissions and adding the National Audit Commission and the Procurement Commission as Independent Commissions. Dual citizens would be banned from holding parliamentary seats, thus ending Basil Rajapaksa's political career. On 25 May, a protest demanding the arrest of Johnston Fernando took place outside the Criminal Investigation Department (CID) headquarters over 9 May Black Monday attacks. Many of the protestors were victims of attacks by loyalists and came to the protests still wearing bandages and casts.

=== June ===
On 9 June, former finance minister Basil Rajapaksa resigned from his post as MP but promised that he would contest again and return. He blamed the economic crisis on the voters for voting for the Rajapaksa family, and denied that the Rajapaksas would exit politics. He also claimed that if the Rajapaksas could not govern Sri Lanka, they would use other methods to influence governance.

During the Australian cricket tour of Sri Lanka, residents of Galle who had been waiting in line to get LPG cylinders surrounded Galle International Stadium with their empty cylinders, saying that they would not leave until they were provided with new cylinders. The police and Army were used to remove anti-government protesters from the fort ramparts overlooking the ground at Galle, even though the public is allowed to hold banners and placards. According to ESPNcricinfo, Sri Lanka Cricket (SLC) told the game's broadcasters not to show any visuals of protests. BASL criticized the removal of protestors, as the decision had no basis in Sri Lankan law.

=== July ===
On 6 July, former MP Hirunika Premachandra was arrested for protesting near the President's House. The arrest sparked another protest, which came under tear gas attack by the police. On 8 July, the IGP Chandana Wickremesinghe declared a "police curfew" which legal experts noted to be illegal and unconstitutional as there is no provision for such a curfew. MP M. A. Sumanthiran, senior lawyer Viran Cores and the BASL issued statements condemning the "police curfew" as an illegal action to prohibit the right to peaceful protest, which would violate the fundamental rights of citizens. The IGP removed the curfew the next day.

==== 9 July: Storming of President's House ====
On 9 July, the President fled his official residence in Colombo after large numbers of protesters gathered at Chatham Street near his house, demanding his immediate resignation. They were able to break into the residence despite the police barricades and tear gas. Protesters also broke into the Presidential Secretariat and Temple Trees, and gathered around the private residence of Prime Minister Ranil Wickremesinghe. Wickremesinghe later announced that he was willing to step down from his position. Though the protests were mostly peaceful, 55 people were hospitalized at Colombo National Hospital.

The Sri Lanka Police, together with the Police's Special Task Force, launched a violent attack near the Prime Minister's residence, beating up protestors, including journalists. Four journalists, including Waruna Sampath and Sarasi Peiris of News First, were beaten up despite media identification and pleads not to be attacked, which was broadcast on live TV. The journalists were hospitalized after the attacks. SSP Romesh Liyanage was identified as the one ordering the attack on journalists. Ranil Wickremesinghe "expressed regret" over the attacks.

The speaker of the Parliament issued a statement that night that President Rajapaksa would resign from office on 13 July 2022. Prime Minister Wickremesinghe announced his willingness to resign once a new government was formed. Later that evening, protesters broke into his residence in Colombo and set it on fire. Some of the protesters who breached President's House, Temple Trees, and the Presidential Secretariat spent the night there, refusing to leave the premises until the prime minister and the president resigned. On 10 July, three people were arrested for the arson of the Prime Minister's residence.

By 10 July, the Presidential Residence had become a tourist attraction, with large numbers of Sri Lankans visiting the building to observe the luxuries enjoyed by the president despite the economic crisis. The Gordon Gardens within the residence was also used by families to have picnics. Security forces were still present but maintained their distance, allowing volunteers from the group of protestors to handle the large influx of Sri Lankans. In some cases, security even joined protestors taking selfies within the complex. The Presidential Secretariat was turned into a temporary library with over 8,000 books in Sinhala, Tamil and English for visitors to read. On 9 and 10 July, the whereabouts of the President remained unknown. On 11 July, BBC News reported that the President was on a Navy vessel in Sri Lankan waters according to Sri Lankan military sources. The Speaker of the Parliament claimed that the President had left the country and would return by Wednesday but later retracted the statement, saying he had never left Sri Lanka at all.

==== 13 July: Appointment of Acting President ====
On the morning of 13 July, President Gotabaya Rajapaksa fled to the Maldives with his wife and two bodyguards, and the Sri Lanka Air Force (SLAF) confirmed that a SLAF plane was given to the President for the trip. He then flew to Singapore on a Saudia Boeing 787 Dreamliner since he had been "allowed entry on a private visit". He fled, as making the resignation within the country would end his presidential immunity. As a result, his resignation was made while outside of Sri Lanka, removing the risk of him being detained. The Speaker of Parliament announced in the afternoon that President Rajapaksa appointed Prime Minister Ranil Wickremesinghe as acting president in his absence. Protesters stormed the office of the prime minister, demanding his resignation.

Protestors stormed the studios of the state-run television channel Sri Lanka Rupavahini Corporation and demanded that news on the anti-government protests be broadcast. The channel went off the air and resumed the live transmission later. Another state-owned television channel, the Independent Television Network (ITN) was also taken off air and later resumed its broadcast. In the evening, protesters reportedly attempted to breach the police barricades placed along the road leading to the Parliament, where protesters confiscated a T-56 and 2 magazines with 60 rounds of ammunition from an Army soldier during the protests. A soldier and a police constable were hospitalized with injuries sustained after being attacked by protesters. Later that night, Acting President Wickremesinghe declared an island-wide curfew until 5:00 am next day (14 July).

==== 14–15 July: President Rajapaksa's resignation ====
On 14 July protestors, from Galle Face announced in a press conference that the protestors who had stormed and occupied the Presidential Palace and the Prime Minister's Office would withdraw from such properties and hand them over to the state, except for the Old Parliament Building and Galle Face where the protestors would continue to exercise their right to protest. Protesters peacefully withdrew from the President's Official House, Temple Trees, and the Prime Minister's Office. President Rajapaksa emailed a letter of resignation to the Speaker of the Parliament later that day. The news of his resignation was celebrated by the public mainly at Galle Face and also in the other parts of Colombo. On 15 July, Speaker Mahinda Yapa Abeywardena announced the resignation and Ranil Wickremesinghe was officially sworn in as the Acting President. Protesters renamed "Gota Go Gama" to "Ranil Go Gama", and demanded he step down.

==== 20–22 July: Under the new President, Galle Face raid ====
On 20 July, Colombo Fort Magistrate issued a court order barring people from assembling within a 50 metres (160 ft) radius of the statue of the late S.W.R.D. Bandaranaike at the Galle Face Green after Colombo Fort Police requested it, citing reports of impending damages to the statue by protestors. On 21 July, the protesters at 'No Deal Gama', located outside Temple Trees in Kollupitiya, left the protest site. Those at Galle Face announced that they would release the President Secretariat back to the authorities by 2:00 pm on 22 July.

At around 2:00 am on 22 July, thousands of armed forces in an operation by the Army, police and Special Task Force stormed the protest site at Galle Face Green to clear the Presidential Secretariat and remove the demonstrators. While forcefully removing the protesters, several civilians and journalists including one from the BBC were reportedly assaulted by the forces. More than 50 people were injured and 9 people were arrested. Several foreign envoys in Sri Lanka including the U.S. Ambassador, Canadian High Commissioner and British High Commissioner raised concerns about this pre-dawn raid. The Human Rights Commission of Sri Lanka, who came to collect accounts from the scene in the aftermath, said it was "a total violation of the fundamental rights of the people by the executive". A day later, the police explained that the protestors were unwilling to vacate the premises and acted aggressively in previous occasions when the police asked them to vacate the Presidential Secretariat.

=== August ===
On 3 August, police ordered protestors at Galle Face to remove all illegally set-up tents and camps on the premises before 5:00 pm on 5 August. On 4 August, after considering three writ applications filed on behalf of protestors, the Court of Appeal announced that the protesters would not be removed from the Galle Face premises until 10 August. On 10 August, which marked the 124th day of Galle Face occupation, protesters vacated the premises.

=== September ===
On 16 September, Sri Lankan Buddhist monks protested against rising electricity prices.

=== November ===
By early November, protests were beginning to cool off, and economic conditions were beginning to improve somewhat. Fuel and gas queues disappeared and power cuts reduced in frequency. Many claimed that the situation had dramatically improved since the departure of Gotabaya Rajapaksa. Inflation rates rapidly declined, the country was declared safe again and tourists resumed visiting the country. The budget for the next fiscal year was announced on 14 November.

== International protests ==
In the United States, several protests were held, including one outside the residence of Gotabaya Rajapaksa's son in Los Angeles during which protesters demanded he summon his father back to the U.S. Another took place in Columbia, Missouri. A protest was also held in front of the Sri Lankan High Commission in London, England. Protests were held in Melbourne, Australia at Federation Square and in Mount Wellington in Auckland, New Zealand. Other Australian cities such as Perth, Brisbane, and Sydney organised protests as well.

Upon Gotabaya Rajapaksa's flight from Sri Lanka to the Maldives on 13 July, minor protests organized by Sri Lankans expats living in the Maldives broke out in Malé, urging the government not to provide a safe haven for Rajapaksa.

== Reactions ==
=== New government ===
On 18 April 2022, in reaction to the protests that had started in March, President Rajapaksa appointed a new 17-member cabinet despite the protests having called for the entire government – including all 225 MPs in parliament and the president – to resign. Dinesh Gunawardena was appointed as Public Administration, Internal Affairs Minister while Douglas Devananda was appointed as Fisheries Minister; Kanaka Herath as Highways Minister; Dilum Amunugama as Transport & Industries Minister; Prasanna Ranatunga as Public Security and Tourism Minister; Channa Jayasumana as Health Minister; Nalaka Godahewa as Media Minister; Pramitha Tennakoon as Ports and Shipping Minister; Amith Thenuka Vidanagamage as Sports & Youth Affairs Minister; Kanchana Wijesekera as Power & Energy Minister; Asanka Shehan Semasinghe as Trade & Samurdhi Development Minister; Janaka Wakkumbura as Agriculture & Irrigation Minister; Vidura Wickremanayake as Labour Minister; Mohan Priyadarshana De Silva as Water Supply Minister; Ramesh Pathirana as Education & Plantation Industries; Wimalaweera Dissanayake as Wildlife & Forest Resources Conservation Minister; and Ahamed Nazeer Zainulabdeen as Environment Minister. In the new cabinet portfolio, female representation was completely excluded, with all 17 ministers being males. This cabinet was forced to resign on the afternoon of 9 July.

=== Opposition ===
The government's handling of the protests was met with criticism and condemnation from several opposition politicians. Opposition MP for Tamil National Alliance M. A. Sumanthiran condemned the government's handling of the protests and called on President Gotabaya Rajapaksa to immediately rescind the gazette notification. He also urged fellow MPs to reject the state of emergency bill. Samagi Jana Balawegaya (SJB) MP Harsha de Silva said that the government had lost its legitimacy for its mishandling of the country's debt crisis. Opposition leader Sajith Premadasa called the state of emergency unconstitutional and condemned the government for violating the law. Premadasa also called on Indian Prime Minister Narendra Modi to intervene in the Sri Lankan political and economic crisis. Ranil Wickremesinghe, at the time former Prime Minister of Sri Lanka and MP of the United National Party (UNP), criticized the Rajapaksas' handling of the crisis and expressed optimism that it could bring an end to the nationalist politics of the Rajapaksas.

On 6 April, members of the SJB held placards and protested inside Parliament demanding that Gotabaya Rajapaksa resign immediately. The SJB party said that it would try to bring a no-confidence motion in Parliament if the President and Prime Minister do not step down.

Samagi Jana Balawageya organised a protest march carrying the slogan "The Struggle for Freedom" began on 26 April 2022 from Kandy and was expected to reach Colombo by 1 May 2022.

=== International ===
The United Nations Human Rights Council said that it was closely monitoring the situation, stating: "The drift towards militarisation and the weakening of institutional checks and balances in Sri Lanka have affected the state's ability to effectively tackle the economic crisis". The European Union was also monitoring the situation and expressed concerns over the "emergency of the situation, which require the authorities to start in-depth discussions with the International Monetary Fund on the reforms needed to bring the Sri Lankan economy back to a sustainable path". The delegation of the EU together with the diplomatic missions of the EU Member States issued a joint statement on 8 April.

The UN Resident Coordinator in Sri Lanka Hanaa Singer and the US Ambassador to Sri Lanka Julie Chung condemned the shooting in Rambukkana and urged to maintain peace, law and order.

The ambassador of Germany to Sri Lanka Holger Seubert praised the protests for being conducted in a peaceful manner. He likened the protests to those that occurred during the 1989–1990 German reunification.

Pope Francis made an appeal for the Sri Lankan authorities to "listen to the aspirations of the people", and said, "I offer a special thought to the people of Sri Lanka, in particular to the young, who in recent times have made their cry heard in the face of the country's social and economic challenges and problems".

On 5 August 2022, a number of international human rights organizations issued a joint statement condemning the government's handling of the protests.

== Departures to foreign states ==
Several reports of members and associates of the Rajapaksa family fleeing the country emerged during the protests. On 3 April, it was reported that a group of nine people, including the wife and in-laws of Namal Rajapaksa, had fled the country. Namal's father-in-law had been appointed director of the state-owned Airport and Aviation (Services) Sri Lanka Limited. On 4 April, Nissanka Senadhipathi, a close ally of the Rajapaksas and the chairman of Avant Garde Maritime Services PMC, allegedly fled to the Maldives with his family members aboard SriLankan Airlines flight UL102. On 5 April, the former deputy minister Nirupama Rajapaksa and niece of current prime minister Mahinda Rajapaksa, who was embroiled in the Pandora Papers scandal, fled to Dubai.

On 7 April, the Colombo Magistrate Court issued an order preventing former CBSL governor Ajith Nivard Cabraal from leaving Sri Lanka until 18 April. The court order was issued on the basis of a case filed by political activist Keerthi Tennakoon against Cabraal regarding misappropriation and misuse of public funds which led to the massive economic crisis in Sri Lanka.

Basil Rajapaksa tested positive for COVID-19 on 16 April 2022 and was hospitalised for treatment. Rumours and speculation spread that he had fled for Dubai on the private jet. The media confirmed that the private jet seen leaving Ratmalana Airport on 16 April was owned by British fashion designer George Davies.

Housing Development Authority Chairman and former MP Duminda Silva left for Singapore on 7 May. Silva was convicted of murdering a rival politician and his supporters in 2011 and had been sentenced to death in 2016 but was pardoned by Gotabaya Rajapaksa in 2021. On 9 May 2022 Yoshitha Rajapaksa, the second son of Mahinda Rajapaksa and his acting chief of staff, left the country with his family. On 13 May 2022, local media reported that State Minister of Rural Road Development Pillayan had fled to Malaysia after the resignation of Mahinda Rajapaksa. Pillayan had been charged and arrested for the murder of a rival MP but was acquitted after the Attorney General withdrew charges against him following the election victory of Gotabaya Rajapaksa.

On 8 July, Namal Rajapaksa's wife, Limini Weerasinghe, and her son left for France via Singapore. However, Namal Rajapaksa denied claims that she fled via a tweet and showed his frustration against the incident being reported as breaking news by a local newspaper.

On 12 July, Basil Rajapaksa, who attempted to flee the country via Bandaranaike International Airport, was forced to turn back after he was met with strong protests at the airport. The immigration and emigration officers attached to Silk Road Departures, which provides a dedicated service to VIPs, also withdrew from their duties. On the same day, The Hindu reported that the United States rejected President Rajapaksa's recent request for a visa.

On 13 July, Gotabaya Rajapaksa fled the country in an SLAF aircraft and arrived at Maldives. On 15 July, Supreme Court issued a temporary travel ban on Mahinda Rajapaksa and Basil Rajapaksa, barring them from flying out of the country until 28 July.

In a later interview with Sri Lankan geopolitical analyst and author Asanga Abeyagoonasekera, Gotabaya Rajapaksa claimed that the Central Intelligence Agency (CIA) played a direct role in his removal from office. This account is documented in the book Winds of Change: Geopolitics at the Crossroads of South and Southeast Asia, published by World Scientific in 2026.

== Popular culture ==
A documentary was made about the protests by journalist Sulochana Peiris.

== See also ==
- 1953 Ceylonese hartal
- Corruption in Sri Lanka
- May 1998 Indonesia riots
- People Power Revolution (1986, Philippines)
- June Democratic Struggle (1987, South Korea)
- July Uprising (2024, Bangladesh)
