= Exile of Gotabaya Rajapaksa =

Self-exile of former Sri Lankan President Gotabaya Rajapaksa in 2022

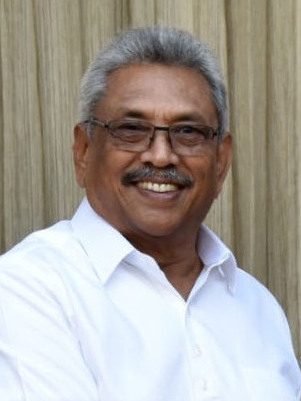
- Rajapaksa in 2019
- Date: 13 July – 2 September 2022
- Duration: 1 month and 20 days
- Location: Sri Lanka Maldives Singapore Thailand
- Cause: Forced removal from office due to widespread civilian protests triggered by a massive economic crisis.
- Participants: Gotabaya Rajapaksa, former President of Sri Lanka; Ioma Rajapaksa, former First Lady of Sri Lanka; Two security officials, Rajapaksa's personal security detail

Gotabaya Rajapaksa, a Sri Lankan politician and former military officer who served as the 8th president of Sri Lanka from 2019 to 2022, initiated a self-imposed exile on 13 July 2022, following widespread protests led by civilians demanding his resignation, triggered by extensive discontent over his handling of the country's economic crisis.

On 13 July 2022, following a string of mammoth protests that eventually culminated into a civilian takeover of his official residence and workplace by protestors, Rajapaksa fled the country, accompanied by his spouse and a personal security detail, to the Maldives, before further retreating to Singapore on 14 July. On 14 July, whilst in exile, Rajapaksa resigned the presidency, becoming the first Sri Lankan president to relinquish the office mid-term. His official letter of resignation, which was emailed to Mahinda Yapa Abeywardena, the speaker of Sri Lanka's parliament, was announced later that day, and was consequently accepted the following day, on 15 July.

Rajapaksa's resignation triggered widespread celebrations amongst the Sri Lankan people, many of whom had long demanded the removal of the Rajapaksa family from power. Ranil Wickremesinghe, a veteran politician whom Rajapaksa had earlier appointed as the country's prime minister, succeeded Rajapaksa as interim president on 15 July and was officially elected to the presidency five days later, on 20 July.

Amidst intensifying calls for holding him accountable for the nation's socio-economic quagmire in the wake of his resignation, Rajapaksa remained in exile in Singapore, before moving to Thailand in August, where he spent the remainder of his exile discreetly. In the midst of intense debating amongst many over a possible homecoming, on 2 September 2022, Rajapaksa returned to Sri Lanka, ending 52 days of self-imposed exile.

== Background ==
=== Biography ===
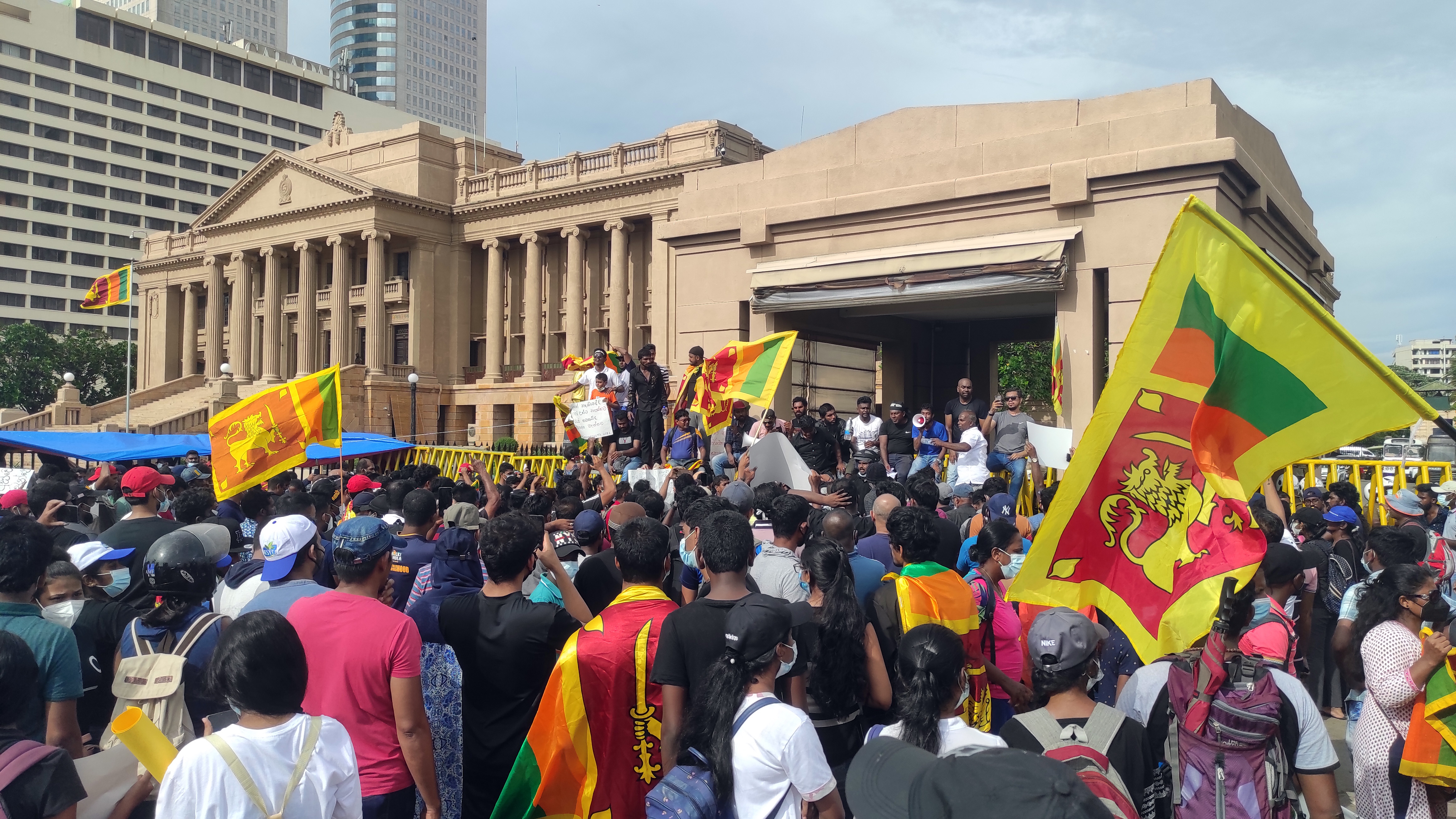
Civilian protests outside the Presidential Secretariat in April 2022.

Nandasena Gotabaya Rajapaksa RWP RSP (Sinhala: නන්දසේන ගෝඨාභය රාජපක්ෂ; Tamil: நந்தசேன கோட்டாபய ராஜபக்ஸ), a noteworthy member of the Rajapaksa political lineage, was a former lieutenant colonel in the Sri Lanka Army (SLA) who served during the initial stages of the Sri Lankan Civil War, from 1971 to 1991. Following a distinguished career in the military, Rajapaksa became a technocrat in the field of information technology, emigrating to the United States in 1998, where he acquired a dual citizenship. Returning to Sri Lanka in 2005, he was made a permanent secretary in the Ministry of Defence during the administration of Mahinda Rajapaksa, his elder brother, who had then been elected as President of Sri Lanka. Between 2005 and 2009, the Rajapaksa brothers spearheaded Sri Lanka's assault against Tamil separatists, led by the Liberation Tigers of Tamil Eelam (LTTE), which ended in an overwhelming Sri Lankan victory in May 2009. Nonetheless, both brothers were accused of having committed numerous war crimes and human rights abuses during the war, charges which both have vehemently denied.

After retiring as Permanent Secretary following Mahinda's electoral defeat in 2015, Rajapaksa contested for the presidency in the country's 2019 presidential election as a candidate of the Sri Lanka Podujana Peramuna (SLPP), which he won, securing 52.25% of the popular vote. Assuming the office in 2019, he re-instated Mahinda as prime minister, later installing several members of his family to multiple portfolios within his government, following the SLPP's thumping victory in the 2020 parliamentary elections. Confronted with an intensifying economic crisis aggravated by financial mismanagement, tax cuts, rising external debt and over-dependence on foreign remittances coupled with the onset of the COVID-19 pandemic, the country began to face shortages of basic necessities, such as fuel, gas and electricity. Rajapaksa's government began to grow hugely unpopular amongst the Sri Lankan people. Amidst the country's intensifying economic plight, many deemed his government to be responsible for the crisis, with critics accusing him of being authoritarian, kleptocratic, nepotistic and corrupt.

=== Escape ===
In the early hours of 9 July, following multiple intelligence inputs indicating that anti-government demonstrations scheduled for later that day were likely to spiral out of control, Rajapaksa and his family were hastily evacuated from the President's House by armed military units. Initially escorted to the headquarters of the Sri Lanka Army, Rajapaksa was later ushered to the Port of Colombo, boarding SLNS Gajabahu, an offshore patrol craft operated by the Sri Lanka Navy (SLN). Although Rajapaksa's whereabouts remained confidential in the immediate hours following his evacuation, amateur video footage taken at the port later that day, showing three men loading suitcases onto Gajabahu, evidently implied Rajapaksa's intent to escape.

After being escorted to safety within the country's territorial waters, Rajapaksa telephoned Mahinda Yapa Abeywardena, Speaker of the Parliament of Sri Lanka, informing him of his intention to resign on 13 July. The following day, on 10 July, Rajapaksa and his entourage were escorted to the protection of SLN Dockyard, Trincomalee, where former prime minister Mahinda Rajapaksa had fled to months earlier, following his own resignation. On 11 July, Rajapaksa and his entourage were flown back to Colombo in two Bell 412 helicopters, landing at SLAF Base Ratmalana. Following a brief meeting with the service chiefs of the Sri Lanka Armed Forces, Rajapaksa was escorted to SLAF Base Katunayake, an airbase operated by the Sri Lanka Air Force (SLAF) adjacent to the Bandaranaike International Airport, later that evening.

== Departure ==
=== Airport stand-off ===
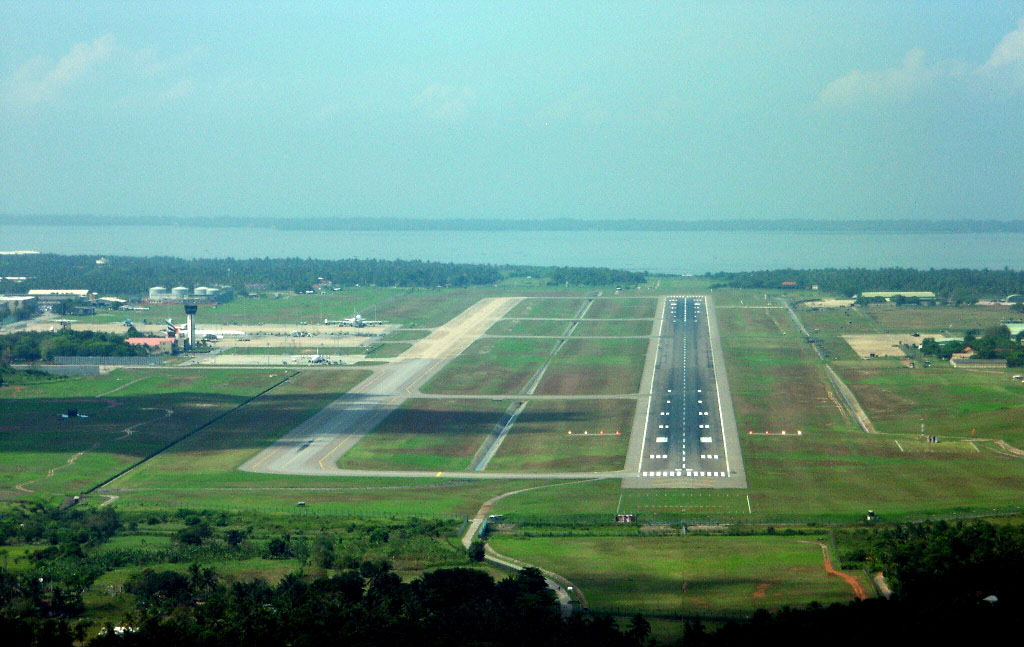
The Bandaranaike International Airport, from where Rajapaksa had attempted to flee on 12 July.

On 12 July, Rajapaksa, still in his capacity as the president, attempted to make a breakout from Colombo, intending to escape to the United Arab Emirates. His attempt at a premature escape while in office was interpreted as an intention to avoid being detained, as only serving functionaries of the presidency were entitled to legal immunity.

However, at the Bandaranaike International Airport, Rajapaksa and his 14-member entourage, which had intended to board SriLankan Airlines UL225 on an 18:25 SLST flight to Dubai, were blocked by immigration officials refusing to process their passports given to them by presidential aides. Rajapaksa, who had barricaded himself inside the airport's VIP suite, refused to join a public immigration queue for procedural cross-checks, afraid of violent disruptions from other travellers. Further efforts by Rajapaksa's aides to persuade the airport's immigration staff failed; the plane eventually left Colombo without him nor his delegation on board. Rajapaksa later attempted to board Etihad Airways EY267 on a 21:20 SLST flight to Abu Dhabi; however, this attempt was also thwarted for similar reasons. Forced with no other alternative, Rajapaksa's delegation retreated to the protection of SLAF Base Katunayake, for an overnight stay.

In total, Rajapaksa missed four flights leaving Colombo, as a result of his refusal to personally appear for immigration checks, in fear of reprisals from other civilians present at the airport. In the aftermath of the incident, multiple reports indicated that Rajapaksa may have considered possible alternatives of escaping – including the use of a naval patrol craft to escape to either the Maldives or to India, to take a connecting flight to Dubai, or to fly on a private charter from Mattala Rajapaksa International Airport.

=== Evacuation from Sri Lanka ===
==== Maldives (13–14 July) ====
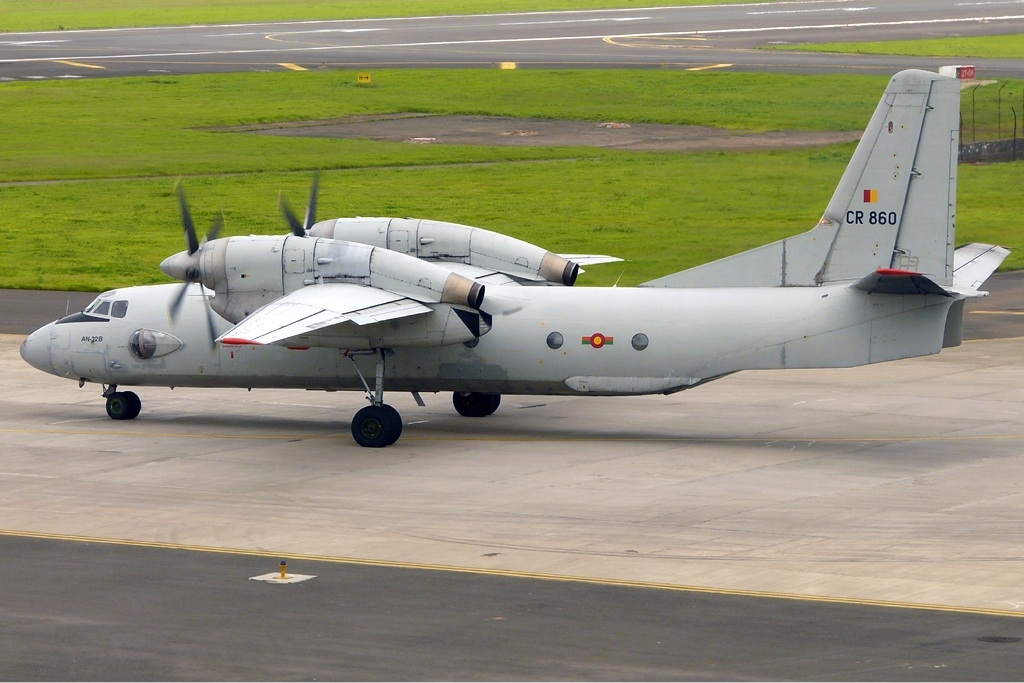
An SLAF An-32 military transport aircraft, similar to the one which was used to evacuate Rajapaksa.

On the morning of 13 July, a small delegation consisting of Rajapaksa, his wife, and two security officials were evacuated by an Antonov An-32 military transport aircraft operated by the Sri Lanka Air Force (SLAF) to the Maldives. Amidst intensifying outrage over his escape, the SLAF later clarified that the evacuation was conducted on the request of the Sri Lankan government in accordance with the president's constitutional powers, with the support of the Ministry of Defense.

Reportedly, Rajapaksa's escape was negotiated by Mohamed Nasheed, the speaker of the Maldivian parliament, who is believed to have shared close ties with Sri Lanka. According to several reports, the aircraft carrying Rajapaksa's delegation was initially barred from landing in Maldivian territory by the Maldives Civil Aviation Authority; however, the aircraft was later permitted to land, after Nasheed intervened on Rajapaksa's behalf. Accordingly, Rajapaksa's aircraft landed at the Velana International Airport at approximately 03:00 MVT on 13 July. While initially escorted by Maldivian police authorities to an undisclosed location, Rajapaksa was later sheltered at the Waldorf Astoria Maldives Ithaafushi resort, a luxury resort hotel located in the South Malé Atoll.

Nasheed's role in facilitating Rajapaksa's escape created an uproar in the Maldives, with critics accusing him of having brokered an escape strategy for the Rajapaksa family. The Progressive Party of Maldives (PPM), the principal opposition party in the Maldivian parliament, opposed Rajapaksa's entry into the country, arguing that a military aircraft of foreign-origin could only be permitted inside Maldivian airspace subject to approval by the Maldives National Defence Force (MNDF).

Responding to intensifying criticism, the Maldivian Ministry of Foreign Affairs issued a clarification, stating:

"The Government of Maldives, at the official request of the Government of Sri Lanka, granted diplomatic clearance for a Sri Lanka Air Force aircraft carrying His Excellency Gotabaya Rajapaksa, President of Sri Lanka and spouse, on a transit visit, to land at the Velana International Airport on 13 July 2022. President Rajapaksa left to Singapore on 14 July 2022."

— Ministry of Foreign Affairs of Maldives

On the night of 13 July, Rajapaksa, who was originally scheduled to depart the Maldives on Singapore Airlines SQ 437 on a 23:25 MVT flight to Singapore, deferred from boarding the flight, citing security concerns of reprisals from other civilian passengers on board.

==== Singapore (14 July – 11 August) ====
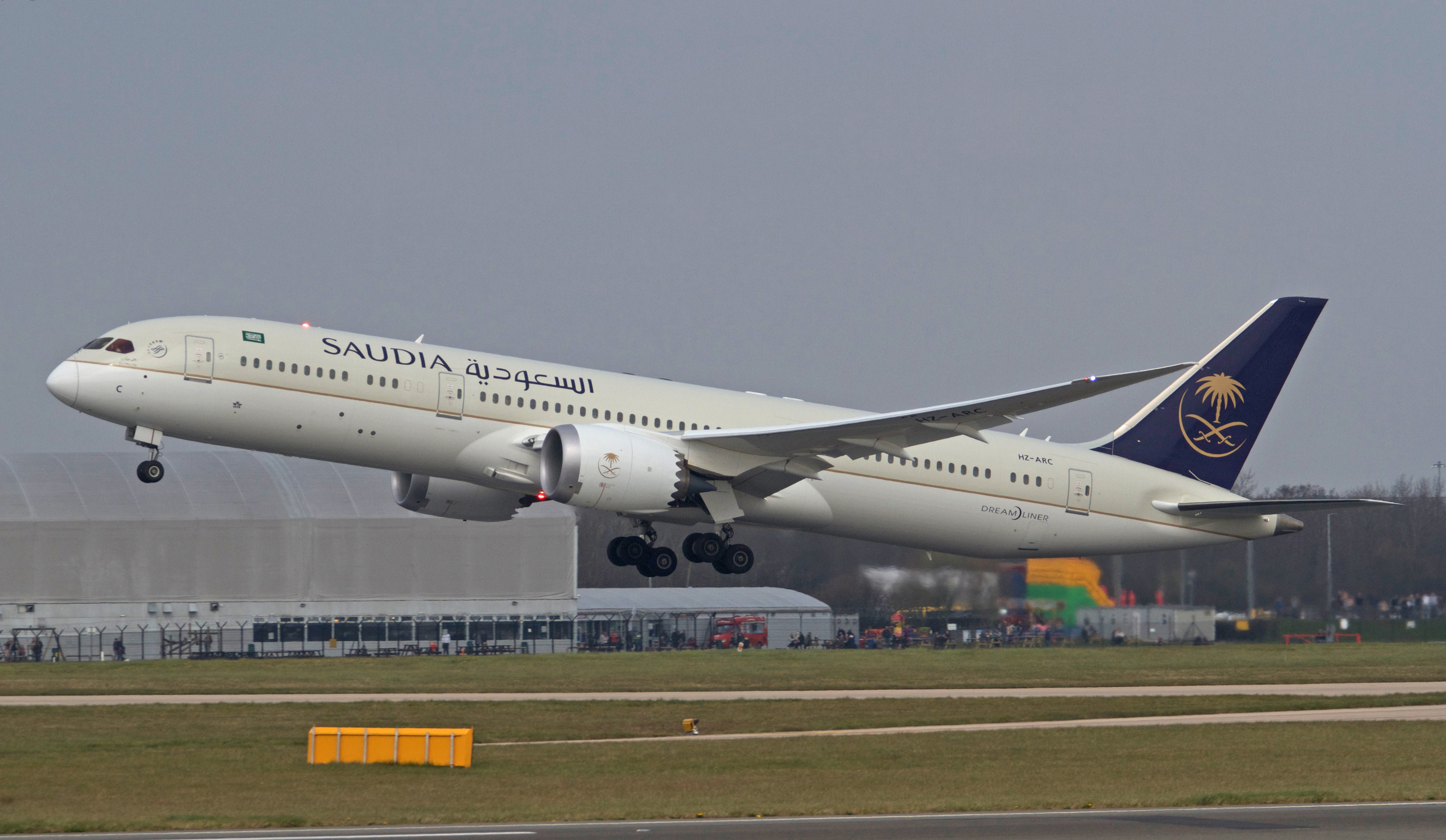
A Saudia Boeing 787, similar to the one Rajapaksa used to fly to Singapore.

On 14 July, Rajapaksa's delegation boarded Saudia flight SV788 on a 11:30 MVT flight to Singapore, landing at Changi Airport at 19:17 SST. According to Maldivian government officials, Rajapaksa was reportedly scheduled to travel on the same plane on a connecting flight to Jeddah, Saudi Arabia; however, he and his accompanying entourage briskly left the airport soon after landing, which indicated no further objective of continuing on to the Middle East, as was claimed by multiple reports.

In a statement confirming Rajapaksa's presence in the country, Singapore's Ministry of Foreign Affairs (MFA) issued a statement, clarifying:

"In response to media queries, it is confirmed that Mr Rajapaksa has been allowed entry into Singapore on a private visit. He has not asked for asylum and neither has he been granted any asylum. Singapore generally does not grant requests for asylum."

— Ministry of Foreign Affairs, 14 July 2022

In addition to the MFA's clarification, the Immigration and Checkpoints Authority (ICA) on 20 July acknowledged that Rajapaksa had been issued a 14-day short-term visit pass (STVP), asserting that visitors from Sri Lanka on the grounds of social visits would generally be granted an STVP of a duration of up to 30 days, with the ability to apply for an extension online. Subsequently, on 27 July, the ICA granted another 14-day extension to Rajapaksa's visa, allowing him to remain in Singapore till 11 August. Notably, Rajapaksa's choice to retreat to Singapore was attributed to the fact that he, along with his elder brother Mahinda, had frequently travelled to the city-state multiple times prior for their respective medical examinations.

Shortly after Rajapaksa arrival, the Singapore Police Force (SPF) issued a strict warning against any possible demonstrations, cautioning any would-be protestors of severe consequences. Nonetheless, Rajapaksa's presence did incite a string of muted protests across the country, many of which were attended only by a handful of demonstrators. In a Change.org petition created the day Rajapaksa landed in Singapore, Raymond Ng, a Singapore national and the author of the petition, wrote that he had filed a police report with Singaporean police authorities against Rajapaksa for cash laundering, stating that he had been compelled by his "loyalty to the Republic of Singapore". On Twitter, several Sri Lankans tagged the Singapore government's Twitter account as a channel to express their anger; the tags were swiftly removed a short while later. However, irrespective of the anger shown towards Rajapaksa's presence in Singapore, several Singaporeans argued that his visit wasn't controversial, observing that he was still a legitimate passport-holder and not a wanted fugitive at the time of his arrival.

Amidst intensifying uncertainty over his future plans, on 6 August, the Sri Lankan government requested Singaporean authorities to grant an additional 14-day extension to Rajapaksa's STVP, citing Sri Lanka's internal political turmoil as a reason. Four days later, on 10 August, Thailand's Ministry of Foreign Affairs disclosed that Rajapaksa had requested entry into the country, but without any personal intention of seeking political asylum. Tanee Sangrat, a spokesperson for the ministry, confirmed the development, stating that Rajapaksa's visit was on a temporary basis. In addition to Sangrat's clarification, Thai prime minister Prayut Chan-o-cha also confirmed Rajapaksa's impending visit, asserting that his entry had been granted on humanitarian grounds, on the condition that he does not conduct any political activities in the country. Additionally, Thailand's foreign minister, Don Pramudwinai, clarified that Rajapaksa's status as a diplomatic passport holder would grant him the ability to stay in the country for 90 days, adding that the Sri Lankan government did not oppose his visit.

On 11 August, the date of his STVP's expiration, Rajapaksa departed Singapore, which was confirmed by the ICA in a statement it released the same day.

== Resignation ==
=== Events ===
On 14 July, Rajapaksa, whilst in exile, submitted an official letter of resignation via email to Mahinda Yapa Abeywardena, the Speaker of the Parliament of Sri Lanka, through Sri Lanka's High Commission in Singapore. Abeywardena's office announced the development later that evening; nonetheless, it stated that Rajapaksa's email would not be accepted, asserting that it required a paper copy of the resignation, for legal verification. Rajapaksa's letter of resignation was later flown on a diplomatic flight to Colombo, and was subsequently accepted by Abeywardena in a formal announcement on the morning of 15 July, formally ending Rajapaksa's presidency.

In his resignation letter, the contents of which were read to the Sri Lankan parliament in a 13-minute parliamentary session on 16 July, Rajapaksa asserted that he took "all possible steps" to avoid the nation's economic crisis, arguing that economic mismanagement predating his administration, coupled with the onset of the COVID-19 pandemic in Sri Lanka and the nation's subsequent COVID-19 lockdowns were predominant causes for its dire economic situation, stating:

"It is my personal belief that I took all possible steps to address this crisis, including inviting parliamentarians to form an all-party or unity government.
I took action to protect people from the pandemic despite being constrained by the already poor economic environment that prevailed at the time.
During 2020 and 2021 I was compelled to order lockdowns and the foreign exchange situation deteriorated. In my view, I took the best course of action by suggesting an all-party or a national government to tackle the situation.
I have contributed my utmost for the country and in the future too, I will contribute for the country.
It is a matter of personal satisfaction for me that I was able to protect our people from the pandemic despite the economic crisis we were already facing."

— Gotabaya Rajapaksa

The news of Rajapaksa's resignation triggered massive celebrations among civilians across Sri Lanka in the intervening hours of 14–15 July; in Colombo, jubilant crowds converged upon the Presidential Secretariat, the principal site of the country's anti-government protests, celebrating with an indulgence of music, fireworks, and dance in defiance of a city-wide overnight curfew. In response to Rajapaksa's resignation, anti-government activists conceded to withdraw protestors from government-occupied buildings, including the President's House and the Prime Minister's Office, which had been occupied by protestors on 9 July; nonetheless, civilian demonstrators retained control of the Presidential Secretariat, vowing to remain until their protest-demands had been met.

=== Succession ===
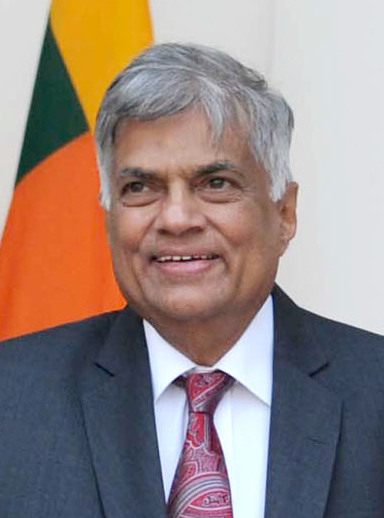
Ranil Wickremesinghe

On 15 July, hours after Abeywardena's affirmation of Rajapaksa's resignation, Ranil Wickremesinghe, a veteran politician whom Rajapaksa had appointed as prime minister two months earlier, was sworn in as the nation's interim president, in accordance with the Sri Lankan presidential line of succession. Wickremesinghe, a longtime member of parliament (MP) and the leader of the centre-right United National Party (UNP), had previously served as Sri Lanka's prime minister on six separate occasions between 1994 and 2022, the most recent stint being in May 2022, when he was appointed to the office following the resignation of his predecessor, Mahinda Rajapaksa, in the wake of escalating anti-government protests. Incidentally, Wickremesinghe had unsuccessfully contested for the presidency twice, during the country's 1999 and 2005 presidential elections, ironically losing to Mahinda in the latter election.

In a televised address following his inauguration, Wickremesinghe pledged to restore orderliness to the country and to take action against protest violence, stating that there was a "big difference between protesters and insurgents". Additionally, Wickremesinghe vowed to curb the powers of the country's executive presidency through the restoration of the Nineteenth Amendment of the Constitution of Sri Lanka, of which powers had been superseded by the opposing Twentieth Amendment, which was passed by the Rajapaksa administration in October 2020. In addition to these acts, Wickremesinghe further prohibited the practice of the presidential style "His Excellency" and the use of the Sri Lankan presidential flag, as a measure to promote unity.

However, Wickremesinghe, who had grown unpopular amongst many over his mishandling of the 2019 Easter bombings, his contentious relationship with former president Maithripala Sirisena and his inefficiency to stimulate the nation's economic plight – all of which had occurred during his previous stints as prime minister, was repudiated by protestors over the news of his appointment. In addition to being regarded by observers of having a lack of political heft and public support – which was demonstrated by the UNP's shattering defeat in the country's 2020 parliamentary elections, Wickremesinghe was also accused of being an ally of the Rajapaksa family; his earlier appointment as prime minister two months earlier was regarded by several as a measure to alleviate mounting pressure on Rajapaksa to resign.

Nevertheless, on the day of Wickremesinghe's inauguration, a faction of the country's ruling party – the SLPP, led by the party's general secretary, Sagara Kariyawasam, announced its intention to nominate him as its candidate for the country's presidential by-elections, which were swiftly arranged in the wake of Rajapaksa's resignation.

== Post-resignation activities ==
=== Thailand (11 August – 2 September) ===
On the evening of 11 August, one day after the confirmation of his visa request by the Thai government, Rajapaksa and his wife departed Singapore on a private charter via Seletar Airport. However, amidst concerns of a possible information leak, the aircraft, which was originally scheduled to land in Phuket, was redirected to Bangkok, landing at the Don Mueang International Airport at around 20:00 THA (13:00 GMT). Amongst concerns over Rajapaksa's safety, Thai police authorities authorized the deployment of plainclothes police officers of the Special Branch Bureau, as a measure of protection. In addition to his whereabouts being kept confidential, Rajapaksa was advised not to venture out of his hotel to avoid any potential threat to his safety.

Amidst speculations over the former president's future itinerary, on 17 August, Udayanga Weeratunga, a former Sri Lankan ambassador to the Russian Federation and a member of the Rajapaksa family, stated that Rajapaksa would return to Sri Lanka on 24 August. Two days later, on 19 August, several media outlets reported that Rajapaksa had planned to procure a green card to emigrate to the United States, on account of his wife's status as a US citizen.

=== Return to Sri Lanka ===
On 17 August, in a discussion with CNN, Sri Lanka's finance minister Ali Sabry indicated that Rajapaksa may have planned to return to the country by the end of the month, adding that such an action had been informed to the Sri Lankan government via diplomatic channels.

In the intervening hours between 2–3 September, Rajapaksa returned to Sri Lanka, having commuted via Singapore Airlines flight SQ468 from Singapore to Colombo. Received at the Bandaranaike International Airport by SLPP members amidst a tight security presence, Rajapaksa was escorted by a police escort to a government residence located in Malalasekara Mawatha, Colombo 07. As a former president, Rajapaksa was accorded the additional privileges of security and a personal staff.

== International responses ==
=== India ===
On 13 July, hours after Rajapaksa fled to the Maldives, India's High Commission in Sri Lanka dismissed several reports accusing the Indian government of having facilitated his escape, deeming them as "baseless and speculative". In response to media queries over the ensuing political crisis, India's Ministry of External Affairs stated that it had been monitoring the situation, calling for an "early solution" based on the principles of "democratic means and values and established institution and constitutional framework", in line with India's Neighbourhood First foreign policy initiative.

On 16 July, one day after Rajapaksa's resignation, Gopal Baglay, India's High Commissioner to Sri Lanka, called on Abeywardena as part of a goodwill overture, assuring him of India's support of "democracy, stability and economic recovery" in Sri Lanka. Amidst growing security concerns over the intensifying turmoil in Sri Lanka, the Indian government summoned an all-party meeting on 19 July, briefing both governing and opposition coalitions of the ensuing upheaval.

On 20 July, the scheduled date of Sri Lanka's interim presidential election, India's High Commission categorically denied reports alleging Indian involvement in influencing the polls, branding them as "baseless and purely speculative".

=== Maldives ===
On 14 July, in a tweet announcing Rajapaksa's resignation, Mohamed Nasheed, the speaker of the People's Majlis, expressed his hopes of a steady recovery for Sri Lanka, stating that Rajapaksa "would not have resigned if he were still in Sri Lanka", adding that he had been "fearful of losing his life".

=== United Kingdom ===
On 14 July, during an urgently-held debate in the House of Commons, several British parliamentarians debated the possibilities of holding Rajapaksa's administration accountable for Sri Lanka's economic plight and for humanitarian abuses committed during the closing years the Sri Lankan Civil War. Over the course of the debate, several topics, including the possibilities of the establishment of a new pluralist constitution, racial equality, and the ratification of the Rome Statute were discussed.

Ed Davey MP, the leader of the Liberal Democrats and a longtime critic of the Rajapaksa family, demanded that a global arrest warrant be issued against Rajapaksa, arguing that "corruption, tax cuts, skyrocketing defense expenditure, draconian police powers and cronyism" were principal stimulants of the crisis. In addition to Davey's comments, other opposition MPs, including Catherine West, Stella Creasy and Stephen Timms highlighted numerous human-rights abuses that had occurred during the Rajapaksa family regime, questioning Sri Lanka's non-compliance on the United Nations High Commissioner for Refugees (UNHCR).

Responding to questions over the conduct of the Rajapaksa government, Amanda Milling, the Minister of State for Asia and the Middle East, maintained a neutral stance, calling for restraint amongst Sri Lankans. Milling avoided several questions raised during the debate, particularly ones highlighting the possibility of repatriating Rajapaksa to Sri Lanka, and those concerning Sri Lanka's human rights record.

== See also ==
- 2019–present Sri Lankan economic crisis
- 2022 Sri Lankan protests
- 2022 Sri Lankan political crisis
