= Jaya Wewa =

Sri Lankan patriotic slogan

Jaya Wewa (Sinhala: ජය වේවා) is a salutation and slogan used in Sri Lanka, best translated as "May you be victorious" or "Victory" in Sinhalese. It is most often used patriotically in the phrase "Sri Lanka Jaya Wewa" (ශ්‍රී ලංකා ජය වේවා; transl. Victory to Sri Lanka). It is used in political speeches, as a battle cry, as a chant at sporting events, or to support rallies. It is used equivalently to the Indian phrase “Jai Hind,” or the Pakistani phrase “Pakistan Zindabad.”

== Etymology ==
The word jaya (ජය) in Sinhalese means "victory", and is borrowed from Sanskrit "jaya" (जय), which means "triumph, victory, cheers, bravo, rejoice". The word is very commonly used throughout Sinhalese literature, such as the Mahāvaṃsa. In a Sanskrit context, the word appears in both Vedic texts such as the Atharvaveda, as well as post-Vedic texts such as the Mahabharata. It is the same root word as the one used in the Indian patriotic slogan "Jai Hind".

The word wewa (වේවා) in Sinhalese means "may it happen". For example "subha davasak wewā" (සුභ දවසක් වෙවා), which translates to "May you have a good day". Broken down it means "subha" (good) + "davasak" (day) + "wewā" (may it happen).

== History ==
Jaya Wewa gained prominence as a slogan and chant in favor of the Sri Lankan independence movement.

Jaya Wewa was also used during the 2022 Sri Lankan protests, also known as Aragalaya. Many crowds were heard chanting "Aragalayata Jaya Wewa" or "Victory to the struggle". It is also used colloquially to wish the country success in getting out of its current economic crisis.

== See also ==
- Jaya
- Jai Hind
- Pakistan Zindabad
