= Sri Lankan presidential line of succession =

Order of assuming powers of Sri Lankan presidency

The Sri Lankan presidential line of succession is the order in which the Prime Minister of Sri Lanka and other persons of the Sri Lankan government may assume the powers and duties of the President of Sri Lanka upon the incapacity, resignation or death of an incumbent President.

== Constitutional procedure ==
The first of three paragraphs that make up Article 40 of the Constitution states that:

(a) If the office of President shall become vacant prior to the expiration of his term of office, Parliament shall elect as President one of its Members who is qualified to be elected to the office of President. Any person so succeeding to the office of President shall hold office only for the unexpired period of the term of office of the President vacating office.

(b) Such election shall be held as soon as possible after, and in no case later than one month from, the date of, occurrence of the vacancy. Such election shall be by secret ballot and by an absolute majority of the votes cast in accordance with such procedure as Parliament may by law provide:

Provided that if such vacancy occurs after the dissolution of Parliament, the President shall be elected by the new Parliament within one month of its first meeting.

(c) During the period between the occurrence of such vacancy and the assumption of office by the new President, the Prime Minister shall act in the office of President and shall appoint one of the other Ministers of the Cabinet to act in the office of Prime Minister:

Provided that if the office of Prime Minister be then vacant or the Prime Minister is unable to act, the Speaker shall act in the office of President.

— Article 40, "Vacation of office by President and election of succeeding President"

== Current order ==
Until the Parliament of Sri Lanka is able to elect a new president, the following order is applied for the line of succession to act as President of Sri Lanka. The current presidential line of succession as specified by the constitution is:

No.	Office	Incumbent	Party
1	Prime Minister	Harini Amarasuriya	National People's Power
2	Speaker of the Parliament	Jagath Wickramaratne	National People's Power

== List of acting presidents ==
No.	Successor	Party	President	Party	Reason	Date
1	Dingiri Banda Wijetunga	United National Party	Ranasinghe Premadasa	United National Party	Death	1 May 1993 (4 years, 3 months and 29 days into Premadasa's presidency)
2	Ranil Wickremesinghe	United National Party	Gotabaya Rajapaksa	Sri Lanka Podujana Peramuna	Resignation	14 July 2022 (2 years, 7 months and 26 days into Rajapaksa's presidency)
