= Prime Minister of Sri Lanka =

Second most senior office in Sri Lanka

- ශ්‍රී ලංකා අග්‍රාමාත්‍ය இலங்கை பிரதமர்
- Emblem of Sri Lanka

- Flag of Sri Lanka

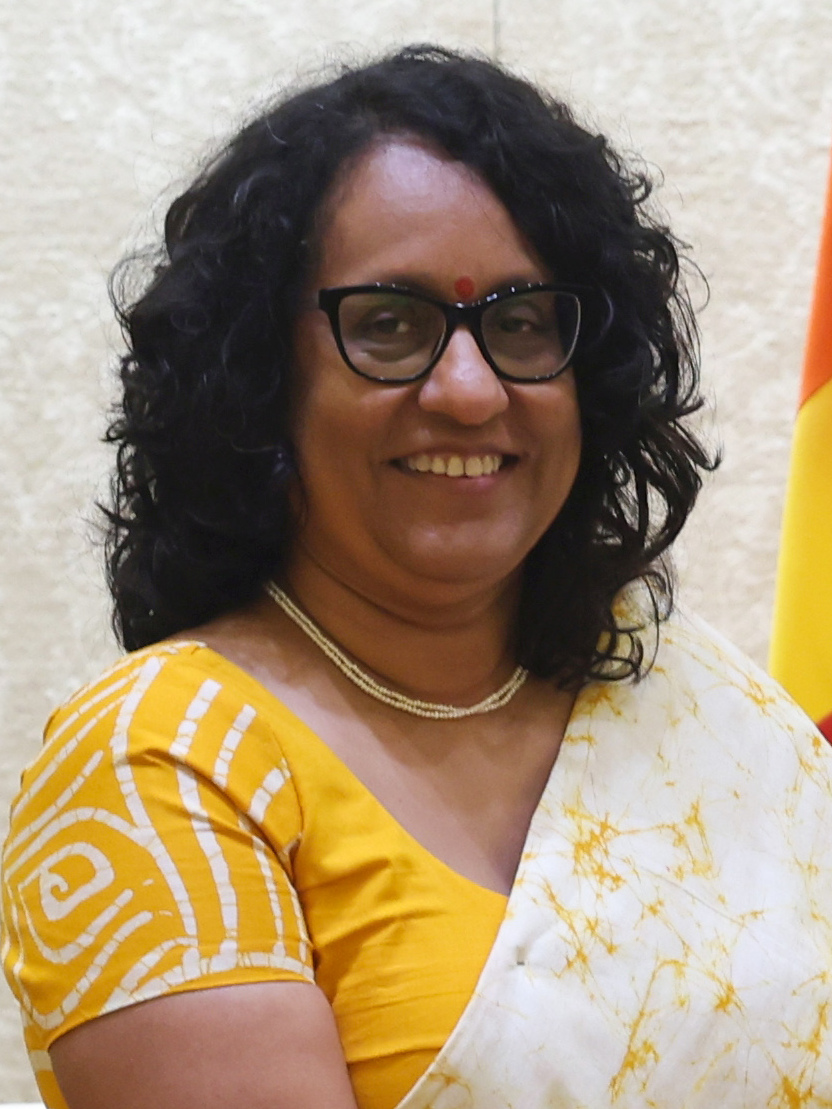
- Incumbent; Harini Amarasuriya since 24 September 2024
- Style: The Honourable; Madam Prime Minister (informal); Her Excellency (diplomatic)
- Member of: Parliament of Sri Lanka; Cabinet of Sri Lanka; National Security Council
- Reports to: President of Sri Lanka; Parliament of Sri Lanka
- Residence: Temple Trees
- Appointer: President of Sri Lanka
- Term length: At the pleasure of the president; Parliament term is 5 years unless dissolved sooner; No term limits specified
- Constituting instrument: Constitution of the Democratic Socialist Republic of Sri Lanka
- Precursor: Chief Secretary of Ceylon
- Inaugural holder: Don Stephen Senanayake
- Formation: 14 October 1947; 79 years ago
- Succession: First
- Website: Prime Minister's Office

The Prime Minister of Sri Lanka, officially the Prime Minister of the Democratic Socialist Republic of Sri Lanka is the second-highest ranking office in the executive branch of the Government of Sri Lanka, after the President of Sri Lanka, and ranks first in the presidential line of succession. The prime minister is the most senior member of parliament in the cabinet of ministers. The Cabinet is collectively held accountable to parliament for their policies and actions. The powers and functions of the prime minister has changed several times since the creation of the office in 1947.

Harini Amarasuriya is the 16th and current prime minister of Sri Lanka, serving since 24 September 2024.

== Appointment ==
The president will appoint a member of parliament as prime minister, who, in the president's opinion, "is most likely to command the confidence of Parliament". The prime minister holds office throughout the period during which the cabinet of ministers continues to function under the provisions of the constitution, unless the prime minister resigns from the post or ceases to be a member of parliament.

== Powers and role ==
Under the Soulbury Constitution, the post of Prime Minister was created in 1947 as the head of government of Ceylon in the Westminster system. In 1978, under the second amendment to the Republican Constitution of 1972, much of the powers of the premiership were transferred to the executive presidency as head of government and head of the cabinet of ministers in addition to being the head of state. As a result, the prime minister became a both senior member in the cabinet of ministers and a successor to the president. The prime minister would serve as the deputy to the president if both are from the same political party. On certain occasions, when the president is not from the majority party in parliament or a national government is formed, the prime minister would be appointed from a party different from the president's. In such a situation, the prime minister would serve as the de facto head of government. In 2015, the nineteenth amendment restored a certain degree of powers to the premiership.

The prime minister is the second in the order of precedence after the president. The prime minister would be a member of the constitutional council, national security council and the most senior member of the cabinet of ministers.

=== Principal adviser to the president ===
By the constitution, the prime minister holds formal power to advise the president on:

- Appointment, dismissal, or acceptance of the resignation of cabinet and non-cabinet ministers.
- Change of subjects assigned to cabinet ministers.

=== Presidential succession ===
As per the constitution, if the office of president becomes vacant, the prime minister would "act in the office of President during the period between the occurrence of such vacancy and the assumption of office by the new president and shall appoint one of the other ministers of the Cabinet to act in the office of Prime Minister". In such a situation, if the office of Prime Minister is vacant or the prime minister is unable to act, the Speaker of the Parliament shall act in the office of President instead.

The president may appoint the prime minister to exercise, perform and discharge the powers, duties and functions of the office of President for a period during the president is unable to exercise, perform and discharge the powers, duties and functions of his office due to illness, absence from Sri Lanka or any other cause.

== Privileges of office ==
=== Official residence and office ===
The official residence of the prime minister is the Prime Minister's House most commonly referred to as Temple Trees. The prime minister has the use of the Prime Minister's Lodge as a vacationing residence in the holiday-town of Nuwara Eliya. The Prime Minister's Office is located in the Sirimathipaya on Sir Ernest de Silva Mawatha (formerly known as Flower Road) in Colombo.

In recent years, Temple Trees has also been used by some presidents of Sri Lanka, such as Kumaratunga and Rajapaksa, while some prime ministers such as Wickremesinghe have chosen to stay at their own personal residences.

=== Travel ===
For ground travel, the prime minister uses the prime ministerial car, which is an armored black Mercedes-Benz S-Class (S600) Pullman Guard. For domestic air travel, helicopters from the No. 4 (VVIP/VIP) Helicopter Squadron of the Sri Lanka Air Force are used while for long-distance travel, regular flights of the SriLankan Airlines are used.

=== Security ===
Traditionally, security for the prime minister has been provided by the Sri Lanka Police. After the establishment of the office of Prime Minister in 1948, a sub inspector of the Ceylon Police Force had been assigned for personal protection of the prime minister, until S. W. R. D. Bandaranaike dismissed his personal protection officer. During Bandaranaike's assassination, only a lone police constable stood guard at the entrance of his residence. Following the assassination, successive prime ministers received a police guard headed by a sub-inspector. This was supplemented by the Army's Field Security Detachment following the 1962 attempted coup d'état and during the 1971 JVP insurrection. Today, the Prime Minister's Security Division is in charge of security of the prime minister.

=== Order of precedence ===
In the Sri Lankan order of precedence, the prime minister is placed after the president, but before the Speaker of the Parliament.

== History ==
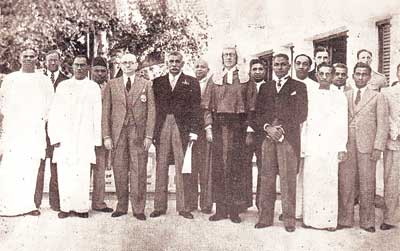
The first Prime Minister of Ceylon with his Cabinet members

The post of Prime Minister of Ceylon was created in 1947 replacing the colonial post of Chief Secretary of Ceylon, as Ceylon gained self-rule with the formation of the Dominion of Ceylon under the recommendations of the Soulbury Commission under the Ceylon Independence Act, 1947 and The Ceylon (Constitution and Independence) Orders in Council 1947. The D. S. Senanayake, the leader of the newly formed United National Party became the first Prime Minister. Carrying forward the scope of the former Chief Secretary, the Prime Minister retained the portfolios of External Affairs and Defence as the Minister of External Affairs and Defence.

In 1972, when Sri Lanka became a republic the name of the post changed to Prime Minister of Sri Lanka. With a Westminster-based political system established the prime minister was the head of government and therefore held the most powerful political office of the country at the time. This changed with a constitutional change in 1978, when the executive presidency was created, making the president both head of state and head of government. Until 1978, the prime minister was also the minister of defence and external affairs. The prime minister is appointed by the president as a member of the cabinet of ministers. In the event that the office of the president is vacant, the prime minister becomes the acting president until Parliament convenes to elect a successor or new elections would be held to elect a new president. This was the case with H.E. President Dingiri Banda Wijetunge. UNP leader Ranil Wickremesinghe has served as prime minister on six occasions, while former UNP leader Dudley Senanayake and former Sri Lanka Freedom Party leader Sirimavo Bandaranaike were each appointed respectively four and three times to the position. With the passing of the 19th amendment to the constitution in 2015, the prime minister was granted more powers when appointing ministers and leading the cabinet.

=== 2018 Sri Lankan constitutional crisis ===
On 26 October 2018, former president Mahinda Rajapaksa was appointed as the prime minister by president Maithripala Sirisena, dismissing incumbent prime minister Ranil Wickremesinghe. Wickremesinghe refused to accept the dismissal stating that it was unconstitutional, resulting in a constitutional crisis.

On 3 December 2018, a court issued an interim order preventing Mahinda Rajapaksha from functioning in the position. On 16 December 2018, Ranil Wickremesinghe was re-appointed as Prime Minister, ending the crisis.

=== 2022 Sri Lankan economic and political crisis ===
In March 2022, anti-government protests erupted in Sri Lanka in retaliation to the economic mismanagement of the country, which led to the island nation's worst economic crisis since independence. Protesters blamed the Rajapaksa family, one which had been dominating Sri Lankan politics for decades, for the economic instability of Sri Lanka. On 9 May 2022, prime minister Mahinda Rajapaksa submitted his letter of resignation amidst the protests. Three days later, on 12 May 2022, president Gotabaya Rajapaksa appointed veteran politician Ranil Wickremesinghe as prime minister.

On 9 July 2022, protesters stormed the Presidential Secretariat, the President's official residence, and set fire to Prime Minister Ranil Wickremesinghe's personal residence. This would lead to president Gotabaya Rajapaksa's evacuation from Sri Lanka on 13 July 2022, and in his absence, appointed prime minister Ranil Wickremesinghe as acting president under Article 37 (1) of Sri Lanka's constitution during his absence. Rajapaksa formally resigned a day later, and Wickremesinghe was appointed as acting president. On 20 July, Ranil Wickremesinghe was elected President of Sri Lanka by the Sri Lankan Parliament. Two days later, on 22 July, Wickremesinghe appointed Dinesh Gunawardena as the Prime Minister of Sri Lanka.

== See also ==
- List of prime ministers of Sri Lanka
