= 115 Fifth Lane =

Residence of Ranil Wickremesinghe

- Location within Greater Colombo

General information
- Location: No 115, Fifth Lane, Colombo, Sri Lanka
- Coordinates: 6°54′20″N 79°51′21″E

115 Fifth Lane (commonly known as Fifth Lane) is the home of Ranil Wickremesinghe, the former Prime Minister and President of Sri Lanka. It was built by Wickremesinghe's father, press baron Esmond Wickremesinghe. In his capacity as prime minister, Wickremesinghe continued to live at Fifth Lane, using the prime minister's official residence, Temple Trees, only for official functions during his time as prime minister, with the exception of the 2018 Sri Lankan constitutional crisis. During Wickremesinghe's tenure as opposition leader, he met many foreign dignitaries at Fifth Lane.

The living room of Fifth Lane was badly damaged on 23 March 1965 when a bomb was thrown into the house and exploded moments after Dudley Senanayake had left the premises while negotiations were underway to form a government.

On July 9, 2022, protestors stormed the residence, in connection with the political and the economic crisis which was going on since 2019. Subsequently, Wickremesinghe stated his willingness to resign, in order to make way for an all-party government. The residence was broken in to by protestors and set on fire at just after 21:10 (16:40 BST). Wickremesinghe was not present during the arrival of protestors.

== See also ==
- Braemar, Colombo
