= D. A. Rajapaksa Museum =

Museum in Hambantota, Sri Lanka

D. A. Rajapaksa Museum also simply called the Rajapaksa Museum is a museum in Hambantota, Sri Lanka dedicated to the late D. A. Rajapaksa and his wife Dandina Rajapaksa of the Rajapaksa family, the parents of Sri Lankan President Mahinda Rajapaksa and Gotabaya Rajapaksa. The museum contained personal belongings of D.A and Dandina Rajapaksa including handwritten letters and photos of the Rajapaksa family. The construction of the museum has attracted controversy over the misuse of public funds and the use of state institutions such as the Sri Lankan Navy and Urban Development Authority. It was largely destroyed during the 2022 Sri Lankan Protests.

== History ==
=== Opening ===
The Museum was opened on 6 November 2014 by then President Mahinda Rajapaksa alongside several members of the Rajapaksa family holding positions of power including Speaker Chamal Rajapaksa, Economic Development Minister Basil Rajapaksa, Secretary of the Defence and Urban Development Gotabaya Rajapaksa, MP Namal Rajapaksa and Uva Province Chief Minister Shasheendra Rajapaksa.

=== Corruption Investigation ===
After the fall of the Rajapaksa government in 2015 investigations were opened against corruption of the former government. Financial Crimes Investigation Division (FCID), submitted evidence to the Colombo Fort Magistrate Court (B/30485/ 4/ 15) that the construction was funded by an institution under former Defence Secretary Rajapaksa and have resulted in the misappropriation of Government funds worth over Rs. 60 million rupees. The use of an official position to cause the misappropriation of state funds is a non-bailable charge under the Offences against Public Property Act. Gotabaya denied the charges and claimed he had verbally agreed with the Sri Lanka Land Reclamation and Development Corporation (SLLRDC) to pay the money back through his family foundation. But the FCID could not find any agreement written or verbal and found that officials had acted solely on the Defence Secretary's instructions.

After the Rajapaksas returned to power in 2019 investigations fell apart as Gotabaya Rajapaksa now had presidential immunity and many of the accused were acquitted in 2021. The FCID which investigated the case was dissolved in 2020

=== Devastation ===
During 2022 Sri Lankan protests and the anti-Rajapaksa riots that took place on May 9 and 10, 2022, this museum was also set on fire and destroyed. Its two tombs had been torn down by and returned to the ground. The statue of D.A. Rajapaksa at Tangalle was also torn down and destroyed.
