= Corruption in Sri Lanka =

Corruption in Sri Lanka is considered a major problem in all levels of society, from the top echelons of political power to minor staff levels.

According to Transparency International's 2025 Corruption Perceptions Index, Sri Lanka scored 35 on a scale from 0 ("highly corrupt") to 100 ("very clean"). When ranked by score, Sri Lanka ranked #107 among the 182 countries in the Index, where the country ranked #1 is perceived to have the most honest public sector. For comparison with regional scores, the best score among those countries of the Asia Pacific region that appeared in the Index (Note: Afghanistan, Australia, Bangladesh, Bhutan, Brunei Darussalam, Cambodia, China, Fiji, Hong Kong, India, Indonesia, Japan, North Korea, South Korea, Laos, Malaysia, Maldives, Mongolia, Myanmar, Nepal, New Zealand, Pakistan, Papua New Guinea, Philippines, Singapore, Solomon Islands, Sri Lanka, Taiwan, Thailand, Timor-Leste, Vanuatu, and Vietnam) was 84, the average score was 45 and the worst score was 15. For comparison with worldwide scores, the best score was 89 (ranked 1), the average score was 42, and the worst score was 9 (ranked 181, in a two-way tie).

Corruption directly affects the welfare of citizens by decreasing public investments in health, education, infrastructure, security, housing and plantations. One of the more recent forms of corruption is through public procurement because of the lack of transparency in transactions that happen within the government.

Weak whistleblower protections undermine citizens' willingness to stand up against corruption. Despite some recent institutional reforms by the government to fight corruption, whistleblower protections need to be improved. The problems are long-standing, and despite ongoing calls for reform, and many attempts to improve the situation, there is little evidence of progress. Most of the Sri Lankan population consider bribery to be just a fact of life and that bribing a public official is necessary to get most jobs done.

Officials and politicians who have been involved in corruption have been either given presidential pardons or have escaped to foreign countries to escape punishment. Several incidents have occurred where corrupt individuals were freed without penalty due to their political connections. Although the Commission to Investigate Allegations of Bribery or Corruption exists, its powers have been curbed by powerful politicians and business tycoons and, in most cases, the commission has not been able to act independently.

Successive governments have often pledged to eradicate corruption but, practically speaking, this has been an impossible task due to years of mismanagement and a lack of good governance. The political parties and politicians have often pledged to end corruption during election times, in the hopes of winning over voters.

Corruption in Sri Lanka is considered an ongoing serious national issue which has dampened economic growth and lowered the quality of life for most Sri Lankans. High-income inequality/disparity and increased poverty have contributed to the prevalent corruption culture in Sri Lanka. Corruption has always been a hot topic in Sri Lanka and has been a root cause of Sri Lanka's worsening economic situation since 2019.

Corruption was among many issues which provoked the 2022 nationwide protests. These were massive demonstrations against the administration of Gotabaya Rajapaksan and their impetus stemmed from the inability of the general public to fulfill their basic needs and wants due to shortages, rolling power cuts, hyperinflation, the decline in disposable income and the lack of foreign reserves to import basic essentials.

== Mahinda Rajapaksa administration (2005–2015) ==
Just before the 2005 presidential election, Rajapaksa was accused of stealing public money, donations intended for tsunami victims of the 2004 Indian Ocean earthquake and tsunami. When Mahinda served as Prime Minister in 2004, the money was sent by international donors to the Prime Minister's national relief fund to serve the requirements of people whose livelihoods were adversely affected by the tsunami on Boxing Day, 26 December 2004. However, funds for the betterment of the public were credited to the privately-run scheme called "Helping Hambantota" and the funds never reached the affected people.

=== 2015 presidential election and beyond ===
According to the Presidential Commission of Inquiry investigating irregularities in SriLankan Airlines, security officers and vehicles of the national carrier had been used in the Rajapaksa's 2015 presidential campaign. Nishantha Wickramasinghe, a brother-in-law of Rajapaksa, was Chairman of SriLankan Airlines until Rajapaksa lost the presidential election in 2015.

The Sri Lanka Air Force announced that Mahinda Rajapaksa and his family had used military aircraft for the election campaign, using $17,300 (Rs. 2,278,000) of public funds to travel across the island. Rajapaksa and his family were the subjects of numerous state resource abuse complaints from organizations and election monitors, including claims of their involvement in fraud, misuse of powers, murder, and money-laundering activities said to have taken $5.31 billion (Rs. 700 billion) out of the country illegally through the Central Bank, using Rajapaksa's close association with Ajith Nivard Cabraal, the former governor of the Central Bank of Sri Lanka.

In 2015, the Sirisena-led government started investigations of China Harbour Engineering Company on suspicion of offering bribes to Mahinda Rajapaksa's failed presidential re-election campaign. The company also apparently landed a $1.4 billion contract to establish the Port City in Colombo, which was suspended when the Sirisena regime took over.

=== Ugandan links ===
Several sources claimed that Mahinda Rajapaksa had maintained close ties with Uganda, especially during his second term as President from 2010 to 2015. Mahinda Rajapaksa also reported to have befriended Sri Lankan High Commissioner to Uganda, Velupillai Kananathan during the former's first official presidential trip to Uganda in 2014.

== Yahapalanaya government (2015–2019) ==
The government formed in 2015 under Maithripala Sirisena and Prime Minister Ranil Wickremesinghe came in promising to tackle corruption. Ending corruption at all levels was the key objective put in place by the Sri Lanka Freedom Party and United National Party joint government during their election campaigns in 2015.

Sirisena promised to take necessary action against the Rajapaksas regarding the corrupt practices while Mahinda Rajapaksa served as the President of Sri Lanka. However, the Yahapalanaya government itself was embroiled in a huge Central Bank of Sri Lanka bond scandal within a month of taking office. Arjuna Mahendran was appointed as the Central Bank governor, replacing Ajith Nivard Cabraal, who was involved in the bond scandal.

In 27 February 2015, newly appointed CBSL governor Arjuna Mahendran advertised the sale of Rs. 1 billion in 30-year government bonds at a coupon of 12.5% Despite several accounts erroneously citing an indicative rate of 9.5%. The sale was oversubscribed with 36 bids of totaling Rs. 20 billion. The majority of bidders, 26, bid for Rs. 100 million or less at a rate of 9.5–10.5%. However, a few bidders, including Perpetual Treasuries Limited, wanted interest rates of 11%–12%. On 27 February 2015, the CBSL accepted Rs. 10 billion in bids at rates of 9.5–12.5%, which meant that the base value of the auction doubled twenty times. The issuing of ten times the advertised bonds, and at a higher than-expected rate, was alleged to cost the Sri Lankan government an additional Rs. 1.6 billion ($ 10.6 million), though this alleged loss was disputed by the Leader of the House of Parliament. A petition was lodged in the Supreme Court of Sri Lanka contesting the methodology used to allege such a loss. Perpetual Treasuries were issued, directly and indirectly, with Rs. 5 billion in bonds at 12.5%. Perpetual Treasuries was one of the primary dealers in the sale and is owned by Mahendran's son-in-law Arjun Aloysius. The primary dealer had also appointed the sister of the former Central Bank Governor Ajit Nivard Cabraal onto the Board of its holding company.

In 2016, Sirisena into his second year presidency was involved in a controversy after allegations were raised that he and his political adviser had reportedly demanded a political donation to be paid by the Australian-based company Snowy Mountains Engineering Company. As per the company emails, the incident happened when Sirisena was a cabinet minister during the tenure of Mahinda Rajapaksa as the president. The overseas staff members of Snowy Mountains Engineering Company had bribed officials to secure a $2.3 million sewerage project in 2011. In return, Sirisena was all set to approve the awarding of the dam contract to SMEC worth $1.82 million.

== Gotabaya administration (2019–2021) ==
The government was embroiled in controversy over inappropriately handling public funds of over Rs. 15 billion behind the huge tax cut to sugar importers in 2020. As a result, the sugar scam cost Sri Lanka a whopping 15.9 billion rupees in tax revenue.

=== Uganda row ===
On 14 April 2021, the official Twitter account of SriLankan Airlines, the country's flag carrier, claimed that the airline's cargo division had made history by operating three successive cargo charter flights to Entebbe International Airport, Uganda's sole international airport, airlifting over 102 metric tonnes of printed paper in February 2021. What kind of printed paper was not revealed by SriLankan Airlines. However, the airline deleted the tweet for unknown reasons and it created doubts about transparency at the flag carrier. Speculation arose about the transfer. SriLankan Airlines later issued a statement clarifying that the printed material shipped to Uganda included only Ugandan currency notes, and that due to security issues with neighboring Kenya, the Ugandan government preferred to obtain printed Ugandan shilling currency notes from a global security printer. The Biyagama branch of the De La Rue company prints currency notes for countries, which include Uganda. SriLankan Airlines insisted that the consignment was purely commercial, and brought much-needed foreign revenue to the airline as well as the country.

== See also ==
- Crime in Sri Lanka
