= Temple Trees =

- අරලිය ගහ මන්දිරය அலரி மாளிகை
- Location within Greater Colombo

General information
- Location: Galle Road, Colombo 03, Colombo, Sri Lanka
- Coordinates: 6.915378985189747°N 79.84906077018499°E
- Current tenants: Harini Amarasuriya
- Owner: Government of Sri Lanka

Temple Trees (Sinhala: අරලිය ගහ මන්දිරය Araliya Gaha Mandiraya) is the official residence of the Prime Minister of Sri Lanka. It is located in Colombo, Sri Lanka. Several recent presidents have used it as their official residence as well.

== History ==
=== Private residence ===
The history of Temple Trees dates back to the early 19th century. Its ownership passed through several prominent British administrators and traders. It was owned between 1830 and 1834 by John Walbeoff of the British Civil Service, who headed the Cinnamon Department of Ceylon. Christopher Elliott M.D.the Principal Medical Officer in Ceylon bought the house in 1848. He was also the proprietor and editor of the 'Colombo Observer'. During the Matale Rebellion, it was the focal point for the public campaign against the excesses of Governor Torrington. In 1856 it was sold to John Philip Green who named it "Temple Trees" in 1856 after the temple trees that grew around the bungalow.

=== Colonial Secretary residence ===
The house was purchased by the British Government of Ceylon and became the residence of the Colonial Secretary and thereafter the Chief Secretary.

=== Prime Ministerial residence ===
With Ceylon gaining self-rule with the enactment of the new constitution, D. S. Senanayake was appointed the first Prime Minister of Ceylon on 24 September 1947. Senanayake took up residence at Temple Trees making it the official Prime Ministerial residence. Some Prime Ministers, since then have preferred to stay at their private homes and only use Temple Trees for official functions. Such as S. W. R. D. Bandaranaike, who was assassinated while at his private residence at Rosmead Place, and Ranil Wickramasinghe who used his private house in 117, 5th Lane, Colombo 03. Temple Trees has taken centre stage in many episodes of modern Sri Lankan history. During the 1962 Ceylonese coup d'état attempt by senior police and reservist military officers, Temple Trees was the principal target. The armoured cars stationed there were withdrawn to facilitate a swift takeover by troops of the Ceylon Artillery. However, the coup was thwarted by the Police CID and the internal security detail of the Royal Ceylon Navy took up guard at Temple Trees. The coup leaders were later brought to Temple Trees for questioning and detained there until they were remanded.

It once again became a refuge for Sirima Bandaranaike when she was rushed there on the night of 4 April 1971 after an assassination plot was uncovered, to be carried out at her private residence at Rosmead Place, at the outset of the 1971 JVP Insurrection. Many cabinet ministers also took refuge at Temple Trees during the early days of the insurrection. It soon became the primary command center for all military operations against the insurrection. Since the 1970s, Temple Trees has been declared a high-security zone with many roads around the mansion and its grounds closed off due to the Sri Lankan civil war and the 2022 Sri Lankan protests.

Temple Trees has been the official residence of all United National Party Prime Ministers of Sri Lanka. After 1994, Sri Lanka Freedom Party Presidents used this house as their residence and the Prime Ministers of that party used Visumpaya. The first Prime Minister from the Sri Lanka Podujana Peramuna, Mahinda Rajapaksha has taken up the use of Temple Trees while retaining his former official residence at Wijerama which was allocated to him as a former President.

=== Siege by protesters during the 2022 protests ===
On 9 July 2022, a large number of protesters demanding the President Gotabaya Rajapaksa and the Prime Minister Ranil Wickremasinghe to resign, entered and sacked Temple Trees, refusing to leave until their resignations. On 14 July protesters peacefully withdrew from the premises.

== List of occupants of Temple Trees ==
Date From	Date To	Resident	Notes
1948	1952	D.S. Senanayake	
1952	1956	Dudley Senanayake	
1956	1959	S.W.R.D. Bandaranaike	
1959	1960	Wijeyananda Dahanayake	
1960		Dudley Senanayake	
1960	1965	Sirimavo Bandaranaike	
1965	1970	Dudley Senanayake	
1970	1977	Sirimavo Bandaranaike	
1977	1978	J. R. Jayewardene	Lived at his private residence Braemar
1978	1989	Ranasinghe Premadasa	
1989	1993	Dingiri Banda Wijetunga	
1993	1994	Ranil Wickremesinghe	
1994	2001	Chandrika Kumaratunga	Lived there as President, Prime Minister resided at her private residence of Horagolla Walauwa
2001	2004	Ranil Wickremesinghe	
2004	2015	Mahinda Rajapaksa	Lived there as President, Prime Minister used Visumpaya
2015	2019	Ranil Wickremasinghe	
2019	2022	Mahinda Rajapaksa	
2022	2022	Ranil Wickremasinghe	
2022	2023	Dinesh Gunawardena	

== See also ==
- President's House, Colombo
- Sirimathipaya Mansion
- Visumpaya
