= Rice production in Sri Lanka =

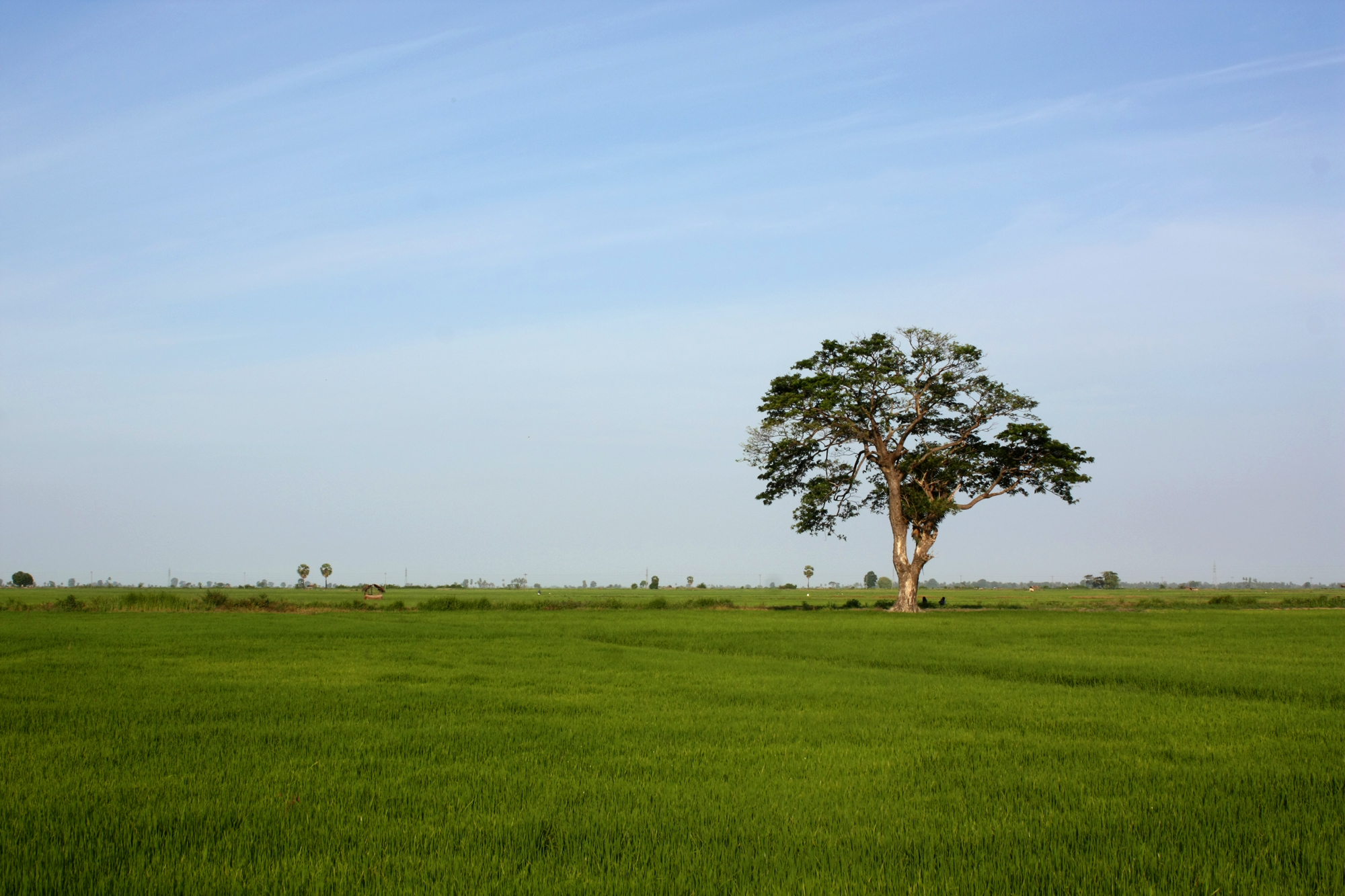
Paddy field in Sammanthurai, Ampara District.

Rice production or Paddy production is one of the main productions and staple foods in Sri Lanka. It cultivates in all districts of Sri Lanka during two monsoon seasons. It is estimated that about 708,000 ha (1,750,000 acres) of land uses for paddy. The seasons are called Maha season and Yala season. (Literally, Sinhala word Maha means bigger and Yala means lesser.) Maha Season starts by September and ends by March during North-east monsoon, and Yala season starts by May and ends by August.

== History ==
In 2019, president Gotabaya Rajapaksa campaigned to eliminate artificial pesticides. In April 2021 he "declared that the entire country would immediately switch to organic farming", yet as of February 2022, still "a majority of farmers say they received no training in organic techniques". The 2021 rice harvest failed, leading to a $1.2 billion emergency food aid program, a $200 million income-support program, and "huge sums to import hundreds of thousands of tonnes of rice". Rajapaska's "sudden and disastrous turn toward organic farming" was panned in international media and the policies were scaled back before the year was over.

== Chronic kidney disease ==
Chronic kidney disease of undetermined causes (CKDu), initially reported among agricultural communities in Sri Lanka, particularly in Southern rural areas, and could be common in other tropical and subtropical rural settings.

== Production statistics ==
Season	Production (million MT)	Year
Maha season	▲3,197	2020
Yala season	▲1,840	2020
Total	▲5,037	2020

== See also ==
- Agriculture in Sri Lanka
- History of rice cultivation § Sri Lanka
