= Acting president =

Person who serves as president when an incumbent is unavailable

An acting president is a person who temporarily fills the role of a country's president when the incumbent president is unavailable (such as by illness or visiting abroad) or when the post is vacant (such as for death, resignation or removal from office). The following articles detail the constitutional role of an acting president in various countries:

- Vice President of Chile
- Acting President of Colombia
- Acting President of France
- Acting President of Georgia
- Acting Head of State of Germany
- Interim and Acting President of Israel
- Acting President of Indonesia (Emergency Cabinet)
- Acting President of Italy
- Acting President of Kazakhstan
- Acting President of Moldova
- Acting President of Pakistan
- Acting President of Poland
- Acting President of Romania
- Acting President of Russia
- Acting President of Sri Lanka
- Acting President of Turkey
- Acting President of the United States

== See also ==
- Acting prime minister
- List of current vice presidents and designated acting presidents
- Interim management
- Provisional government
