= Parliamentary Council =

Former constitutional authority in Sri Lanka

The Parliamentary Council was a constitutional authority in Sri Lanka established under the 18th Amendment to the Constitution of Sri Lanka. Formally being constituted on January 1, 2011 as per the 18th Amendment, it replaces the Constitutional Council that was established under the 17th Amendment. After Maithripala Sirisena was elected President, Prime Minister Ranil Wickremesinghe presented the new reforms to reinstate a new Constitutional Council in 2015 under the Nineteenth Amendment.

== Powers and tasks ==
Compared to the ten member Constitutional Council, which made approval of names of nominees to the independent committees/commissions mandatory; the Parliamentary Council has powers only to recommend persons to the independent committees. The sole authority of appointing members of the independent committees was vested with the President of Sri Lanka and while he is needed to seek the observations of the council, its decisions are not binding.

== Commissions ==
The Council recommends members to several independent committees/commissions. These are;

- Public Service Commission
- Human Rights Commission
- Elections Commission
- National Police Commission
- Commission to Investigate Allegation of Bribery or Corruption
- Finance Commission
- Delimitation Commission.

== Membership ==
The membership of the Parliamentary Council was made up of five members, of whom three are ex officio members and two would be nominated to ensure ethnic representation. The Prime Minister, the Opposition Leader and the Speaker are compulsory members of the committee. The Prime Minister and the Opposition Leader can nominate one person each to the committee from the communities to which the compulsory members do not belong.

Ex officio Members

- Hon. D. M. Jayaratne - Prime Minister of Sri Lanka
- Hon. Chamal Rajapaksa - Speaker of the Parliament of Sri Lanka
- Hon. Ranil Wickremesinghe - Leader of the Opposition

Nominated Members

- Hon. D. M. Swaminathan - Member of Parliament
- Hon. A.H.M. Azwer - Member of Parliament

Secretary to the Parliamentary Council

- Dhammika Kitulgoda - Secretary General of Parliament

== Location ==
The Council sits at the Sri Lankan Parliament Building in Sri Jayawardenepura Kotte.

== See also ==
- Constitutional Council (Sri Lanka)
