= Rehan Jayawickrama =

Sri Lankan politician

Rehan Jayawickreme

Chairman of the Weligama Urban Council
- In office 2018 – August 2020
- Succeeded by: G. G. H. Yamuna Kanthi

Personal details
- Party: Samagi Jana Balawegaya (SJB)
- Other political affiliations: United National Party (UNP) (before 2020)
- Spouse: Anika Wijesuriya (m. 2018)
- Relations: Montague Jayawickrama (Paternal grand uncle); Ranjan Wijeratne (Maternal grand uncle)
- Children: 2

Rehan Dhanushka Wijeratne Jayawickreme is a Sri Lankan politician. He was the Weligama Organiser for the Samagi Jana Balawegaya (SJB) and the former Chairman of the Weligama Urban Council.

Jayawickreme was elected as the United National Party (UNP) Chairman of Weligama in 2018. He was removed from the post in August 2020 after the UNP expelled him for defecting to the newly formed SJB to contest the 2020 parliamentary election.

When announcing his expulsion from the UNP in 2020, Jayawickreme publicly cited this lineage, stating, "I am making these requests as I want the elephant to survive as I come from a family of long-standing UNPers." In 2012, Jayawickrama was involved in an alleged assault on an army major at the Hilton Residencies alongside Malaka Silva, son of former minister Mervyn Silva, leading to their remand. The case was withdrawn by the Attorney General in April 2013.

Since 2020, Jayawickreme has become a prominent opposition activist. He gained national attention in 2023 as a key petitioner in a Fundamental Rights petition filed in the Supreme Court that successfully challenged the constitutionality of the government's controversial Online Safety Bill. He is the grandson of senior UNP politicians Montague Jayawickrama and Ranjan Wijeratne.

== Early life and family ==
Jayawickreme was born as Rehan Dhanushka Wijeratne Jayawickreme. He is the son of Bharathi Wijeratne, who was described as Sri Lanka's first woman tea taster. His mother was the daughter of Hema (Lofty) Wijeratne, who served as Honorary Consul General of Türkiye in Sri Lanka and was associated with the tea trade. His father, Sujith Jayawickreme, was a planter by profession and a nephew of Major Montague Jayawickreme.

Jayawickreme was educated at S. Thomas' College, Mount Lavinia, and the British School of Colombo.

Jayawickreme married Anika Wijesuriya on 14 July 2018 at the Marriott Hotel in Weligama. They have two children: Avaan and a younger son. He identifies as a Buddhist and has expressed interest in interfaith practices, such as fasting during Ramadan. He is active on social media, where he discusses political issues and personal matters.

Jayawickreme belongs to a prominent Sri Lankan political family with deep roots in the United National Party (UNP). His paternal grand uncle was Major Deshamanya Montague Jayawickrama, a senior UNP cabinet minister. His maternal grand uncle was Ranjan Wijeratne who served as the Foreign Minister and State Minister for Defence.

Jayawickreme's maternal great-grandmother, Rosalind Maria Senanayake, was a first cousin of D. S. Senanayake, the first Prime Minister of Ceylon.

== Political career ==
=== Chairman of Weligama Urban Council ===
Jayawickreme entered local politics with the United National Party, contesting the 2018 local authority elections. He was subsequently elected Chairman of the Weligama Urban Council. During his tenure, he oversaw the creation of the "Weligama Urban Development Plan (2019–2030)" in collaboration with the national Urban Development Authority (UDA). In his Chairman's Forward for the plan, dated 21 November 2018, Jayawickreme wrote that he wished Weligama town will be “The Blooming Tourism Bay City in Down South” by 2030."

As chairman of a major tourism hub, he was involved in managing the industry's local impact. In 2019, following a high-profile attack on a group of Dutch tourists by Israeli nationals nearby Mirissa, he called for awareness programmes in collaboration with NGOs and the tourism ministry "to educate these beach boys on the importance of respecting women and on their behaviour and approach." In the same statement, he blamed the police for failing to notify the LG authorities about problematic establishments, highlighting a rift between local government and national law enforcement over regulation.

In April 2019, Rehan Jayawickreme stated that a significant portion of development funding obtained by the Weligama Urban Council was secured through his continuous appeals to central government ministers in Colombo.

Speaking at the opening of a community hall in Mahena, Weligama, constructed at a cost of Rs. 860,000 using council funds, he noted that “every cent” spent by the council for public purposes was the result of his efforts in requesting financial support from ministers.

Jayawickreme also responded to criticism from some councillors, stating that they should assist in securing funding, which would allow him to spend more time focusing on local governance in Weligama.

== Challenge to UNP leadership ==
In May 2019, while serving as Chairman of the Weligama Urban Council, Jayawickreme publicly called on United National Party (UNP) leader Ranil Wickremesinghe to step down and hand over leadership to Deputy Leader Sajith Premadasa.

In a letter addressed to Wickremesinghe, he stated, "I now think your time has passed," and urged him to "have the courage to hand over the reins to your deputy."

The letter argued that the party required "a candidate and party leader who understands the plight of the common citizen," and warned that disciplinary action against him would be accepted "with pride and dignity."

== Association with Mangala Samaraweera ==
In 2020, Jayawickreme accompanied former minister Mangala Samaraweera when the latter was questioned by police over a controversial public statement.

As a member of the Samagi Jana Balawegaya (SJB), he also invited Samaraweera to return to active politics through the party.

Samaraweera has been described in commentary as a prominent liberal political figure and mentor to younger politicians in Sri Lanka.

== Transition to Samagi Jana Balawegaya ==
In May 2019, while still serving as the UNP Mayor of Weligama, Jayawickreme publicly created a "fresh UNP rift" by directly challenging the party leadership. He wrote a letter to party leader Ranil Wickremesinghe, requesting that he "step down as the Party Leader" and hand over the leadership to Sajith Premadasa. When Premadasa broke away from the UNP to form the Samagi Jana Balawegaya (SJB) in 2020, Jayawickreme joined the new party. In June 2020, he received a "show cause" letter from the UNP initiating disciplinary action for submitting nominations for the upcoming general election from another party.

== Removal as Chairman of the Urban Council ==
The UNP officially expelled him in August 2020. This expulsion automatically resulted in him losing his post as Chairman and his seat on the Weligama Urban Council. In a public statement on his removal, Jayawickreme said, "The people haven't removed me [...] it's the United National Party that did." He added that he was "happy" because he was "never tainted with corruption or malpractice" during his tenure."

His post was officially filled in August 2021 by G. G. H. Yamuna Kanthi.

== Parliamentary elections ==
Following his crossover to the SJB, Jayawickreme unsuccessfully contested the 2020 Sri Lankan parliamentary election from the Matara District. was third on the preferences list for the SJB in Matara, which only returned two SJB MPs to Parliament.

Rehan Jayawickreme contested the 2024 Sri Lankan parliamentary election from the Matara District as a candidate of the Samagi Jana Balawegaya but was not elected; only one SJB candidate from the district was returned to Parliament.

== Roles within Samagi Jana Balawegaya ==
In June 2021, Jayawickreme was appointed to the Working Committee of the Samagi Jana Balawegaya (SJB).

He was also appointed Social Development Secretary to Opposition Leader Sajith Premadasa, with the letter of appointment formally handed over by Premadasa.

In September 2022, Jayawickreme was appointed Assistant Secretary of the Samagi Jana Balawegaya’s National Reforms Committee.

He was also appointed Chairman of the party’s LGBTIQ Reforms Committee, while continuing to serve as Vice Chairman of the SJB Youth wing.

Jayawickreme, in his capacity as Chairman of the Samagi Jana Balawegaya’s LGBTIQ Reforms Committee, oversaw the submission of a proposed policy document to Opposition Leader Sajith Premadasa in August 2023.

He stated that the committee had been tasked with completing the policy within two months and indicated plans to engage religious leaders regarding the proposals.

== Political activism and public stances ==
After his 2020 electoral defeat, Jayawickreme became a prominent activist for the SJB. He served as the party's Weligama Organiser and as the Vice Chairman of the Samagi Tharuna Balawegaya (STB), the party's youth wing. He resigned from the youth wing vice chairmanship in November 2023 to focus on the upcoming general election.

=== Opposition to forced cremations ===
During the COVID-19 pandemic in Sri Lanka, Jayawickreme publicly opposed cases that risked compulsory cremation without confirmed medical findings. In May 2020, while serving as Chairman of the Weligama Urban Council, he intervened in a case involving a deceased Muslim woman in Weligama after sections of the media reported that she had died of COVID-19. According to contemporaneous reports, Jayawickreme stated that he had insisted the deceased should not be cremated until a COVID-19 test had been conducted, warning that irresponsible reporting could inflame communal tension. Later accounts of the incident stated that the test result was negative and that the body was ultimately handed over to the family for burial in keeping with their religious beliefs.

In May 2020, Jayawickreme publicly warned two private television channels over what he described as the unauthorised entry into the private property of a suspected COVID-19 patient in Weligama and the invasion of the family’s privacy. Citing powers under the Urban Council Act, he said he would ban unauthorised media access to such private premises in the area and warned that legal action could follow against outlets that continued irresponsible or false reporting on suspected COVID-19 cases.

=== Marriott Weligama COVID-19 incident ===
In November 2020, a guest linked to the Brandix COVID-19 cluster was reported to have stayed at the Weligama Bay Marriott Resort & Spa, prompting contact tracing and quarantine measures involving hotel staff.

Jayawickreme, serving as Chairman of the Weligama Urban Council, instructed the temporary closure of the hotel as a precautionary public health measure.

The hotel management subsequently stated that operations would continue without accepting new room bookings, in line with health guidelines.

=== Criticism of Speaker Mahinda Yapa Abeywardena ===
In November 2022, Jayawickreme criticised Speaker of Parliament Mahinda Yapa Abeywardena, alleging that he had acted in a politically biased manner inconsistent with the neutrality expected of the office.

He further claimed that the Speaker was engaged in political activities, including functioning as a party organiser, which he argued was incompatible with the constitutional expectations of the position.

=== Online Safety Bill petition ===
In October 2023, Jayawickreme was a key petitioner in a high-profile Fundamental Rights petition filed in the Supreme Court of Sri Lanka challenging the constitutionality of the government's controversial Online Safety Bill.

=== Position on the Prevention of Terrorism Act ===
In April 2023, Jayawickreme stated that a Samagi Jana Balawegaya (SJB) working committee had decided to oppose the proposed Anti-Terrorism Act (ATA), adding that the group would advocate this position within the party’s parliamentary group.

In October 2023, Jayawickreme filed a petition before the Supreme Court challenging the proposed Anti-Terrorism Bill, seeking a special determination on its constitutionality.

=== Parliamentary conduct ===
In October 2023, Jayawickreme was reported by The Morning as having objected to comments made by SJB General Secretary Ranjith Madduma Bandara during a parliamentary session. The remarks had drawn criticism from SJB members and State Minister Diana Gamage, who wrote to the Speaker seeking action over the incident.

=== Fundamental rights petition on Community Advisory Committees ===
Jayawickreme was also a petitioner in a Fundamental Rights application filed before the Supreme Court in June 2024 challenging the appointment of Community Advisory Committees, alleging that the move constituted a misuse of state funds and an arbitrary exercise of power.

== Protest outside President Gotabaya Rajapaksa's official residence ==
In July 2022, Jayawickreme was arrested along with several others during a protest outside the official residence of President Gotabaya Rajapaksa amid nationwide demonstrations triggered by Sri Lanka’s economic crisis.

He was later released on bail.

Speaking following his arrest, Jayawickreme stated that the group had been protesting peacefully and had requested a brief meeting with the President before being arrested after crossing police barricades. He also alleged that police used force during the arrest.

The arrest occurred amid widespread public unrest, which later culminated in demonstrators storming the President’s official residence, with President Gotabaya Rajapaksa fleeing the country and subsequently resigning in July 2022.

== Summons by the Criminal Investigation Department ==
In May 2023, Jayawickreme was summoned to the Criminal Investigation Department (CID) in connection with investigations related to the torching of the President’s House.

Responding to the summons, he stated that he would not be intimidated by such actions and criticised to authorities for focusing on politicians rather than criminal activity.

== Statements on Ranil Wickremesinghe presidency ==
In February 2023, Rehan Jayawickreme commented on the circumstances surrounding the appointment of Ranil Wickremesinghe as President of Sri Lanka following the resignation of Gotabaya Rajapaksa amid the 2022 protests.

Speaking to The Morning, Jayawickreme stated that Wickremesinghe “should be thankful” to him and Hirunika Premachandra, claiming that their involvement in the protest movement contributed to Rajapaksa’s removal from office and, consequently, Wickremesinghe’s rise to the presidency. He further alleged that the government was subsequently targeting them through legal action despite their role in the protests.

The remarks were made in the context of Jayawickreme and Premachandra being granted bail by the Fort Magistrate’s Court in relation to a protest held outside Rajapaksa’s residence, while also being summoned by police over additional charges.

== Refusal of parliamentary perks ==
During the 2024 parliamentary election campaign, Jayawickreme stated that he would refuse the standard perks granted to Members of Parliament if elected, including a pension and vehicle permit.

He stated that he believed in serving the public without personal benefits and emphasised the need for new approaches in politics.

== Criticism of rice industry practices ==
In December 2024, Jayawickreme criticised the structure of Sri Lanka’s rice industry, alleging that it was dominated by a small group of powerful mill owners who manipulate prices, exploit farmers, and create artificial shortages.

He called for stronger state intervention, including regulation, penalties, and potential nationalisation, arguing that such measures were necessary to protect both farmers and consumers from market manipulation.

== Weligama PS Chairman assassination ==
In 2025, following the assassination of Lasantha Wickramasekara, the SJB Chairman of the Weligama Pradeshiya Sabha, Jayawickrama became a vocal critic of the government's and police's response. He accused the government of promoting a "convenient cover-up" by "dismissing it as an underworld-related incident." Jayawickrama revealed that Wickramasekara had "repeatedly" warned of threats to his life, including a formal letter sent to the Inspector General of Police (IGP) in August (2025) that detailed an alleged assassination plot targeting him either at court or the council premises. He stated that these "multiple requests" for "special protection" for the chairman and other SJB members were met with "silence" from the police. He called the killing an "extrajudicial execution" and forcefully rejected the government's narrative that the victim was a "known criminal," stating: "The late Chairman won his ward in Midigama with 67% of the vote. He wasn't handpicked through a national list; he earned his mandate directly from the people."

== Stance on illegal tourism businesses ==
In October 2024, Jayawickrama gained national media attention for his public statements on X (formerly Twitter) regarding unregulated foreign-run businesses on Sri Lanka's southern coast, an issue he had raised with authorities since his time as chairman. He specifically highlighted the "illegal activities of certain Israeli business owners," which he claimed had "persisted for far too long." He stated that "numerous appeals to various governments [...] have been ignored" and warned that the situation had escalated into a "serious security threat that could derail Sri Lanka's tourism recovery efforts."

== Defamation claim against NPP MP ==
In July 2025, Jayawickreme issued a letter of demand seeking Rs. 500 million in damages from National People's Power MP Asitha Niroshana over alleged defamatory statements.

=== Other activism ===
Jayawickrama has also engaged in anti-corruption activism using RTI. In 2021, he was part of an SJB team that filed an RTI at the Election Commission to access the asset declarations of former Deputy Minister Nirupama Rajapaksa, who was named in the Pandora Papers leak. In 2024, he confirmed the party had filed another RTI application concerning privileges reportedly requested on behalf of a former president. He has also used his social media platform to highlight cases of alleged injustice. In 2025, he drew public attention to the death of an eight-year-old boy following an incident at the Colombo Swimming Club, alleging "negligence" by the staff. He questioned whether there had been a "hush operation" because the child's family had "limited influence" and "could not push back."

== Call for internal reform within SJB ==
In June 2025, Jayawickreme called on the Samagi Jana Balawegaya (SJB) to undertake internal reflection and reform, stating that the party had strayed from its founding principles and risked losing public support.

He further stated that he was willing to face expulsion from the party for expressing his views, remarking, “If I’m expelled for speaking the truth, so be it.”

== Retirement from party politics ==
In 2025, following election defeats and internal party challenges, Jayawickrama announced his retirement from party politics. He submitted his resignation to SJB leader Sajith Premadasa.

== Temporary return to Samagi Jana Balawegaya ==
In March 2025, Jayawickreme temporarily returned to support Samagi Jana Balawegaya (SJB) candidates contesting the upcoming local government elections in Weligama.

He had previously stepped away from politics following his defeat at the 2024 parliamentary election, and stated that his return was at the request of party leadership and local candidates he had previously worked with.

== Resignation from Samagi Jana Balawegaya ==
In January 2025, Jayawickreme also resigned from the Samagi Jana Balawegaya (SJB) and his position as Weligama organiser in a letter addressed to the party leadership.

In the letter, he stated that his “vision for the future no longer aligns with the party’s direction” and that, following “consecutive election defeats”, he intended to prioritise his family and business commitments.

He also reflected on his role within the party, stating that he had “put [his] reputation, career, and personal stability on the line” in support of its leadership and vision.

== Rebuilding Sri Lanka Fund transparency campaign ==
In 2026, Jayawickreme submitted a series of Right to Information (RTI) requests regarding the government's Rebuilding Sri Lanka Fund, established following Cyclone Ditwah. He sought information relating to the fund's legal status, governance structure, donor contributions, audits, procurement records, disbursements, contractors and monitoring mechanisms.

Following the responses received from public authorities, he publicly raised concerns regarding the availability of records relating to the fund and called for greater transparency and accountability in the management of public donations.

== Controversies ==
=== Assault on Army officer ===
On 8 September 2012, Jayawickrama (then identified in media reports as Rehan Wijeratne), was involved in an alleged assault of an Army intelligence officer along with Malaka Silva, the son of then-minister Mervyn Silva. Both were arrested and remanded for allegedly assaulting Major Chandana Pradeep Susena at a five-star hotel in Colombo and stealing his service weapon, and were transferred to the Prison Hospital. They were later released on bail. The Army officer later recanted his allegation, and was charged with making false statements to law enforcement.

=== Connection to the Sri Lankan Central Bank bond scandal ===
In 2017, prior to their marriage, Jayawickrama's future wife, Anika Wijesuriya, testified before the Presidential Commission of Inquiry into the Central Bank bond issuance scandal. She revealed that she had rented her penthouse apartment at Monarch Residencies to then-Finance Minister Ravi Karunanayake and his family in 2016, with the lease payments of Rs. 1.45 million per month being made by Arjun Aloysius, the owner of Perpetual Treasuries, who was implicated in the bond scam.

== International engagements ==
In 2021, Jayawickrama was selected by the Government of India to participate in the "Gen Next Democracy Network Programme". The program, organized by the Indian Council for Cultural Relations (ICCR), invites young leaders from various countries to India to provide them with an overview of its democratic institutions and heritage. He attended the program from 26 November to 2 December 2021.

== See also ==
- Montague Jayawickrama
- Ranjan Wijeratne
- Samagi Jana Balawegaya
- United National Party
