= Central Bank of Sri Lanka bond scandal =

Central Bank of Sri Lanka bond scandal, also known as the CBSL bond scam, was a financial laundering scam which happened on 27 February 2015 and caused losses of more than US$ 11 million to the nation. The bond scam is also regarded as the largest reported financial scam in Sri Lanka. This was a major blow to the Sri Lankan economy and was also major setback to the newly elected government under the leadership of Maithripala Sirisena which commenced its first term as of 8 January 2015. Arjuna Mahendran was appointed as the Governor of the Central Bank of Sri Lanka replacing Ajith Nivard Cabraal.

This bond issue also caused disputes between the Government of Sri Lanka and Government of Singapore over the extradition requests of Arjuna Mahendran to Sri Lanka.

On 3 September 2019, Singapore's Ministry of Foreign Affairs clarified that the government would consider the extradition request from Sri Lanka once the necessary supporting information and documents were released. In the same month with the approval of Singapore, Sri Lankan government lodged extradition of ex-governor Arjuna Mahendran to Sri Lanka.

== Background ==
In 2015, Arjuna Mahendran, a Singaporean of Sri Lankan Tamil origin, was appointed as the CBSL governor, with the support of Prime Minister Wickremesinghe and in spite of ensuing controversy over his eligibility as a foreign national and over his apparent friendship with Wickremesinghe. It was reported that the current CBSL governor Indrajit Coomaraswamy was to have been appointed to that position but was withdrawn by the latter due to being busy in other projects.

On 27 February 2015, Governor Mahendran advertised the sale of Rs. 1 billion in 30 year government bonds at a coupon of 12.5%. Despite several accounts erroneously cite an indicative rate of 9.5%. The sale was oversubscribed with 36 bids of totaling Rs. 20 billion. The majority of bidders, 26, bidded for Rs. 100 million or less at a rate of 9.5%–10.5%. However, a few bidders, including Perpetual Treasuries Limited, wanted interest rates of 11%–12%. On 27 February 2015, the CBSL accepted Rs. 10 billion in bids at rates of 9.5%–12.5%, which meant that the base value of the auction doubled twenty times. The issuing of ten times the advertised bonds, and at a higher than expected rate, was alleged to cost the Sri Lankan government an additional Rs. 1.6 billion ($ 10.6 million), though this alleged loss was disputed by the Leader of the House of Parliament. A petition was lodged in the Supreme Court of Sri Lanka contesting the methodology used to allege such a loss. Perpetual Treasuries was issued, directly and indirectly, with Rs. 5 billion in bonds at 12.5%. Perpetual Treasuries was one of the primary dealers in the sale and is owned by Mahendran's son-in-law Arjun Aloysius. The primary dealer had also appointed the sister of the former Central Bank Governor Ajit Nivard Cabraal onto the Board of its holding company.

== Aftermath ==
This situation became a controversial political issue in Sri Lanka as the newly elected Sri Lankan Government of President Maithreepala Sirisena came to power with a slogan of good governance in the country. A three-member Committee of eminent lawyers was appointed to investigate the issue and the report produced by the committee claimed that there was no direct involvement by Mahendran in the deal. The Supreme Court of Sri Lanka did not grant leave to proceed in a fundamental rights case that requested a separate inquiry into the bond issue, as no laws were broken.

Mahendran denied any wrongdoing in the controversial bond auction and asserted that he was ready to face any inquiry to prove his innocence. He also said he had been made a victim due to his own transparency.

On the other hand, former governor of the Central Bank of Sri Lanka, Ajith Nivard Cabraal who preceded Mahendran charged that a higher hand was involved in the scandal given the scale of the cover-up attempts by the Sri Lankan government. Cabraal himself is the subject of several investigations by the law enforcement authorities on alleged misconduct during his tenure as Governor.

== Investigations ==
On 28 October 2016, the Committee On Public Enterprises, after a lengthy investigation, found Mahendran responsible for the Bond Issue Scam and recommended legal action be taken against the above. However President Maithripala Sirisena has announced that he had appointed a Special Presidential Commission of Inquiry to further investigate the case. This commission consisted of commission’s chairman Justice K. T. Chitrasiri and members Justice Prasanna Jayawardena and retired Deputy Auditor General, V. Kandasamy. During the inquiry, Mahendran defended his actions before the Commission stating that he had not acted in a manner detrimental to the interests of the Government.

Prasanna Jayawardena was appointed to the Supreme Court as a judge by President Maithripala Sirisena in June 2016. In January 2017, he was appointed by President Sirisena to a three member Special Presidential Commission of Inquiry in the investigate the Bond Issuance at the Central Bank of Sri Lanka, which published its report in December 2017.

The commission handed over the report on Central Bank bond issuance to the President Maithripala Sirisena on 30 December 2017 and the Presidential Secretariat made available the full report in PDF form from its website for public viewing. In the findings of the report, Arjuna Mahendra was held directly responsible for causing a loss of LKR 11,145 million to public institutions. However, Prime Minister Ranil Wickremesinghe has announced that 'No financial loss will be caused to the government on account of the Central Bank Bond issue since the government will recover the Rs 9.2 billion involved from Perpetual Treasures Ltd. according to the procedure recommended by the Presidential Commission. The Central Bank functioning under the Ministry of National Policy has already blocked and retained a fund of Rs 12 billion belonging to the Perpetual Treasures Ltd'

The prolonged nature of the inquiry may have contributed to the rift between President Sirisena and Prime Minister Wickremesinghe that ultimately ended their parties' coalition government. Some MPs from Sirisena's SLFP, along with the opposition, attempted but failed to pass a motion of no-confidence in Wickremesinghe, most acutely in response to the 2018 anti-Muslim riots but apparently also due to ongoing debate over Wickremesinghe's 2015 appointment of Mahendran to the Central Bank. An unrelated concern was cited by Sirisena as the supposed justification for the subsequent constitutional crisis.

In 2016 October COPE revealed that Governor of the Central Bank Arjuna Mahendran should be held responsible for the Bond Issue Scam and legal action should be taken against him. However President Maithripala Sirisena has announced that he has appointed a Commission of Inquiry to further investigate the case.

In March 2019, President of Sri Lanka revealed that Singapore didn't respond to his phone call in early January in a request to return Arjuna Mahendran to Sri Lanka for inquiries and he also slammed the Singaporean government of sheltering the suspect. But the allegations were refuted by Singapore and revealed Colombo failed to provide valid documents and evidences on deporting of Mahendran to Sri Lanka.
