= Arjuna Mahendran =

Former Governor of the Central Bank of Sri Lanka

Governor of the Central Bank of Sri Lanka
- In office 26 January 2015 – 30 June 2016
- Preceded by: Ajith Nivard Cabraal
- Succeeded by: Indrajit Coomaraswamy

Personal details
- Born: Lakshman Arjuna Mahendran; 16 July 1959 (age 67) Colombo, Ceylon
- Education: Royal College, Colombo; Balliol College, Oxford
- Profession: former Banker

Lakshman Arjuna Mahendran is a Sri Lankan-born Singaporean economist and banker. He was Governor of the Central Bank of Sri Lanka from January 2015 to 30 June 2016 and was responsible for the Central Bank of Sri Lanka bond scandal. He was also the former Managing Director of HSBC Private Bank, Chief Investment Officer of Emirates NBD as well as chairman and Director-General of the Board of Investment of Sri Lanka. Mahendran is currently residing in Singapore, which has refused to extradite him on a request from Sri Lanka routed through interpol.

== Education ==
He was educated at Royal College, Colombo in Sri Lanka and at Balliol College, Oxford, he gained a MA in Philosophy, Politics and Economics.

== Banking career ==
Before Mahendran joined the Central Bank of Sri Lanka, he had served as a senior economist before moving into investment banking in Singapore going on to serve as managing director and Chief Investment Strategist-Asia at HSBC Private Bank. He was responsible for driving research and providing in-depth analysis of markets in the Asia Pacific. Mahendran also led the analytics team in interpreting market economics and developing investment strategies for HSBC's clients in the region. Later he served as Chief Investment Officer-Wealth Management division at Emirates NBD. From 2001 to 2004 he served as chairman and Director-General of the Board of Investment of Sri Lanka (BOI). For Mahendran's instrumental role in establishing the Board of Investments of Sri Lanka and driving its strategy, he was named a runner-up in Euromoney Strategic Direct Investor's "CEO Lifetime Achievement Award" in 2003. He served as Chief Economist & Strategist – Asia Pacific at Credit Suisse Group AG and was its Head of Research for Asia Pacific since October 2006.

== Central Bank Governor ==
In 2015 he was appointed as the Governor of the Central Bank of Sri Lanka. He was extremely critical of the Sri Lankan tax system and called the revenue which is only 10% of the GDP "pathetic" and compared the low tax collection in the country to the tax collection of a poor Sub-Saharan country and also criticized the complexity of the tax system and proposed to simplify it and introduce online tax payment systems to streamline tax collection. He also slammed inefficient loss making state-owned enterprises as they have created losses in state banks while giving a "free ride" to private banks as they exploit significant lending spreads by the government banks and proposed to make public enterprises more efficient so that the banking system can be more efficient and make the economy grow faster. The IMF announced a US$1.5 billion lending program to Sri Lanka in March 2016 to restructure the economy during Mahendran's tenure.

=== Singapore queries Sri Lanka's allegations of impropriety by Mr. Mahendran ===
In March 2019 President Sirisena of Sri Lanka accused Singapore authorities of not acting on his request to frame charges against Mahendran. A spokesperson for the Singapore government said there were no grounds to do so. This follows reports that the Singapore authorities had refused the request on the basis that it could not be determined that Mahendran's conduct, if committed in Singapore, would constitute a criminal offence in Singapore according to the evidence presented by Sri Lanka. In February 2015 CBSL advertised the sale of Rs. 1 billion in 30-year government bonds at a coupon of 12.5% though several accounts erroneously cite an indicative rate of 9.5%. Mr Mahendran stated that he grew perturbed that officials of The Central bank had advertised the auction for a very Low figure of Rupees one billion worth of government bonds when the government needed over Rupees 13 billion on the date of the auction and Rupees 172 billion in March 2015. The sale was oversubscribed with 36 bids of totaling Rs. 20 billion. The majority of bidders, 26, bidded for Rs. 100 million or less at a rate of 9.5%–10.5%. However, a few bidders, including Perpetual Treasuries Limited, wanted interest rates of 11%–12%. On 27 February 2015 an official tender board, which did not include Mahendran, accepted Rs. 10 billion in bids at rates of 9.5%–12.5%. The issuing of ten times the advertised bonds, and at a higher than expected rate, was alleged to cost the Sri Lankan government an additional Rs. 1.6 billion ($10.6 million), though this alleged loss was disputed by the Leader of the House of Parliament. A petition was lodged in the Supreme Court of Sri Lanka contesting the methodology used to allege such a loss. Perpetual Treasuries was issued, directly and indirectly, with Rs. 5 billion in bonds at 12.5%. Perpetual Treasuries was one of the primary dealers in the sale and is owned by Mahendran's son-in-law Arjun Aloysius. The primary dealer had also appointed the sister of the former Central Bank Governor Ajit Nivard Cabraal onto the Board of its holding company.

This situation became a controversial political issue in Sri Lanka as the newly elected Sri Lankan Government of President Maithreepala Sirisena came to power with a slogan of good governance in the country. A three-member Committee of eminent lawyers was appointed to investigate the issue and the report produced by the committee claimed that there was no direct involvement by Mahendran in the deal. The Supreme Court of Sri Lanka did not grant leave to proceed in a fundamental rights case that requested a separate inquiry into the bond issue, as no laws were broken.

Mahendran denied any wrongdoing in the controversial bond auction and asserted that he was ready to face any inquiry to prove his innocence. He also said he had been made a victim due to his own transparency. In a related development Mahendran's successor at the Central Bank refused to publish a forensic audit commissioned to probe bond auctions, conducted by KPMG/BDO. The forensic audit did not find any evidence of wrongdoing by Mahendran. Despite efforts to stifle the report, the Speaker of Parliament ruled that the report be made available to Parliament for debate. Around the same time the Board of the Central Bank was reconstituted with new appointees.

A former governor of the Central Bank of Sri Lanka, Ajith Nivard Cabraal who preceded Mahendran charged that a higher hand was involved in the scandal given the scale of the cover-up attempts by the Sri Lankan government. Cabraal himself is the subject of several investigations by the law enforcement authorities on alleged misconduct during his tenure as Governor.

On 28 October 2016 the Committee on Public Enterprises, after a lengthy investigation, found Mahendran responsible for the Bond Issue Scam and recommended legal action be taken against the above. However President Maithripala Sirisena has announced that he has appointed a Special Presidential Commission of Inquiry to further investigate the case. This commission consisted of commission's chairman Justice K. T. Chitrasiri and members Justice Prasanna Jayawardena and retired Deputy Auditor General, V. Kandasamy. During the inquiry, Mahendran defended his actions before the Commission stating that he had not acted in a manner detrimental to the interests of the Government.

The commission handed over the report on Central Bank bond issuance to the President Maithripala Sirisena on 30 December 2017 and the Presidential Secretariat made available the full report in PDF form from its website for public viewing. In the findings of the report, Arjuna Mahendra was held directly responsible for causing a loss of LKR 11,145 million to public institutions. However, Prime Minister Ranil Wickremesinghe has announced that 'No financial loss will be caused to the government on account of the Central Bank Bond issue since the government will recover the Rs 9.2 billion involved from Perpetual Treasures Ltd. according to the procedure recommended by the Presidential Commission. The Central Bank functioning under the Ministry of National Policy has already blocked and retained a fund of Rs 12 billion belonging to the Perpetual Treasures Ltd' In 2016 an independent report published by the UN High Commissioner for Human Rights stated that Such Commissions of Inquiry in Sri Lanka rarely served a useful purpose and stood in the way of competent institutions fulfilling their objectives.

=== Arrest order quashed ===
On 15 March 2018 Colombo Fort Magistrate's Court issued an arrest warrant on Arjuna Mahendra on charges of criminal breach of trust for allegedly providing confidential information of the Central Bank of Sri Lanka to Perpetual Treasuries Limited, a primary dealer connected to and owned by his son-in-law Arjun Aloysius who was arrested on 4 February 2018 along with Kasun Palisena, who was the CEO of Perpetual Treasuries Limited. Mahendra did not surrender himself to the court. The Supreme Court of Sri Lanka had earlier rejected a similar petition. News reports state that Mr Mahendran has challenged the order through the International Police (Interpol). Prime Minister Wickremesinghe made a statement in the Sri Lanka Parliament on 5 June 2018 stating that the Singapore government has refused to arrest Mahendran Lawyers of the accused have made submissions to court contending that the presentation of the Commission of Inquiry CCOI) report in a court of law as evidence is not admissible as the COI does not formally follow the judicially recognised law of evidence.

On 28 June 2019, a case was filed at the Permanent High Court Trial at Bar by the Attorney General against Mahendran accused in the Central Bank Treasury Bond Scam and lost multi billions from Sri Lankan's public money.

On 16 June 2020, the attorney general of Sri Lanka alleged that, according to Interpol, Mahendran had changed his name to Harjan Alexander. However, one of the publications that stated this subsequently carried a reference to Mr Mahendran using his original name, casting doubt on the authenticity of the quote. Mr Mahendran published a rebuttal denying any change of his name alleging, inter alia, that the Sri Lanka Attorney General was instructed to sensationalise the case in the media on the instructions of the President. The same Sri Lanka attorney general ordered the arrest of a staffer in the Swiss embassy in Sri Lanka which was strongly objected to by the Swiss government. In a series of 3 rulings the Special High Court of Sri Lanka dismissed the charges against Mr Mahendran in 2022.
