= Twenty-first Amendment to the Constitution of Sri Lanka =

Constitutional reform of 2022 in Sri Lanka

The Twenty-first Amendment (21A) to the Constitution of Sri Lanka was passed by the 225-member Sri Lankan Parliament with 179 voting in favor, 1 against and 45 abstained on 21 October 2022. The bill was passed with a two-third majority and it was reported that only one MP, Sarath Weerasekara, voted against the bill while 45 MPs were notably absent when the bill was passed in the parliament. The 21st Amendment was originally known as the 22nd Amendment in the political discourse and according to Newsfirst the said amendment would be added to Sri Lankan legislation as the 21st Amendment. The draft amendment was formulated during the critical juncture in Sri Lanka at a time when the country was reeling from massive economic crisis, political chaos and massive anti-government crackdowns. Major changes were made to the text of the draft of the 22nd amendment following the ousting of Gotabaya Rajapaksa. The draft was initially presented to the parliament by Minister of Justice, Prison Affairs and Constitutional Reforms Wijeyadasa Rajapakshe. in August 2022 and the cabinet granted approval for the draft. The 22nd Amendment was initially tabled in the Cabinet on 6 June 2022 by Wijeyadasa Rajapakshe and the discussion on it had been adjourned on multiple occasions due to the failure to reach a consensus after series of disagreements.

The bill that was passed also reinstated some of the reforms back on track which previously existed in the Nineteenth Amendment to the Constitution of Sri Lanka which was passed all the way back in 2015. The Twenty Second Amendment also takes into account some of the underlying key features which previously existed in the 19th Amendment. However, critics argued that it is a farce by the politicians to create false impression among general public by misleading them by indicating that some of the reforms made in 19th Amendment would be reinstated in 22nd Amendment.

The intention and thought process regarding passing of such bill is to curb the executive powers of the President to some extent and to empower the parliament which should serve on behalf of public interest. The bill also aims to restore independent commissions. The bill eventually superseded the Twentieth Amendment to the Constitution of Sri Lanka which meant that the latter would become invalid, null and void and defunct in the political context. The Twentieth Amendment was heavily criticised due to the constitution granting an excessive amount of powers and undue supreme authority to the executive president which was a major talking point during the aftermath of the 2019–present Sri Lankan economic crisis. Therefore, the 22nd amendment reverses most of the reforms and amendments which were introduced in the Twentieth Amendment to the Constitution of Sri Lanka in 2020. On 21 October 2022, the amendment was successfully passed in the parliament with a two-thirds majority in the parliament as the speaker of the House confirming that the third reading of the 22nd Constitution Amendment Bill was passed with amendments.

The opposition party Samagi Jana Balawegaya, Sri Lanka Freedom Party and the Janatha Vimukthi Peramuna all voted in favor of the 22nd Amendment to the Constitution. It was revealed that during the division for the second reading of the 22nd Amendment to the Constitution Bill, 179 parliamentarians voted in favor of the bill and only one MP voted against it as a result the bill was passed with an overwhelming majority breaching the 150 mark. It was insisted that the bill needed 150 MP votes as a minimum benchmark in order to pass it with a majority upfront.

The third reading of the 22nd Amendment to the Constitution was also passed by Parliament with 174 MPs voting for and with 1 MP abstaining from voting. The second reading of the bill was taken up for debate in the parliament on 20 October 2022 and 21 October 2022 for discussions pertaining to the matters around the bill which could make an instant impact in the economy which has already hit rock-bottom.

The President, cabinet of ministers as well as National Council will be held accountable to the Parliament of Sri Lanka under the provisions of 22nd Amendment to the Constitution of Sri Lanka. Furthermore, fifteen committees and oversight committees are also liable and are also will be held accountable under this amendment. The bill also prohibits anyone with dual citizenship from contesting in elections in Sri Lanka and a move which is considered as a wake-up call aftermath the catastrophic economic collapse mainly triggered by the horrible decision making of Gotabaya Rajapaksa who held both Sri Lankan and American citizenships in his possession. The bill also indicates that dual citizens would eventually lose their seats in the parliament as they will play no longer part as far as the new amendment is concerned.

The constitutional amendment however gives some powers to the president such as allowing the President to dissolve the parliament after two and a half years of the parliament being elected. Several prominent features, including curbing the Sri Lankan President's power to sack the Prime Minister and the Cabinet which were included in the draft were approved by the cabinet.

== 21st amendment and Supreme Court ==
The draft amendment was challenged in Supreme Court with regards to certain clauses such as Clause 2 and Clause 3 which were deemed as inconsistent with the Constitution. However, the Supreme Court cleared the bill on 6 September 2022 ruling that the bill could be adopted albeit with a two-thirds majority in the parliament and the court urged a nationwide referendum with reference to some special clauses which are mentioned in the bill.
