= Public Service Commission (Sri Lanka) =

The Public Service Commission (PSC) of Sri Lanka is an independent government commission established under the Constitution of Sri Lanka to manage human resources in the public service.

The first Public Service Commission was established in 1946 under the Ceylon (Constitution) Order in Council, with powers over the appointment, transfer, promotion and disciplinary control of public officers. In 1972, the First Republican Constitution abolished the Public Service Commission and vested authority over the public service in the Cabinet, assisted by Advisory Boards for appointments and discipline. The Second Republican Constitution in 1978, reestablished the Public Service Commission as an independent statutory body. Appointments of department heads were retained by the President. The Eighteenth Amendment once again removed the Public Service Commission, only to be reestablished in the Nineteenth Amendment, which was repealed by the Twentieth Amendment.
