= Ajith Perera =

Sri Lankan politician (born 1967)

Hon. Ajith P. Perera MP
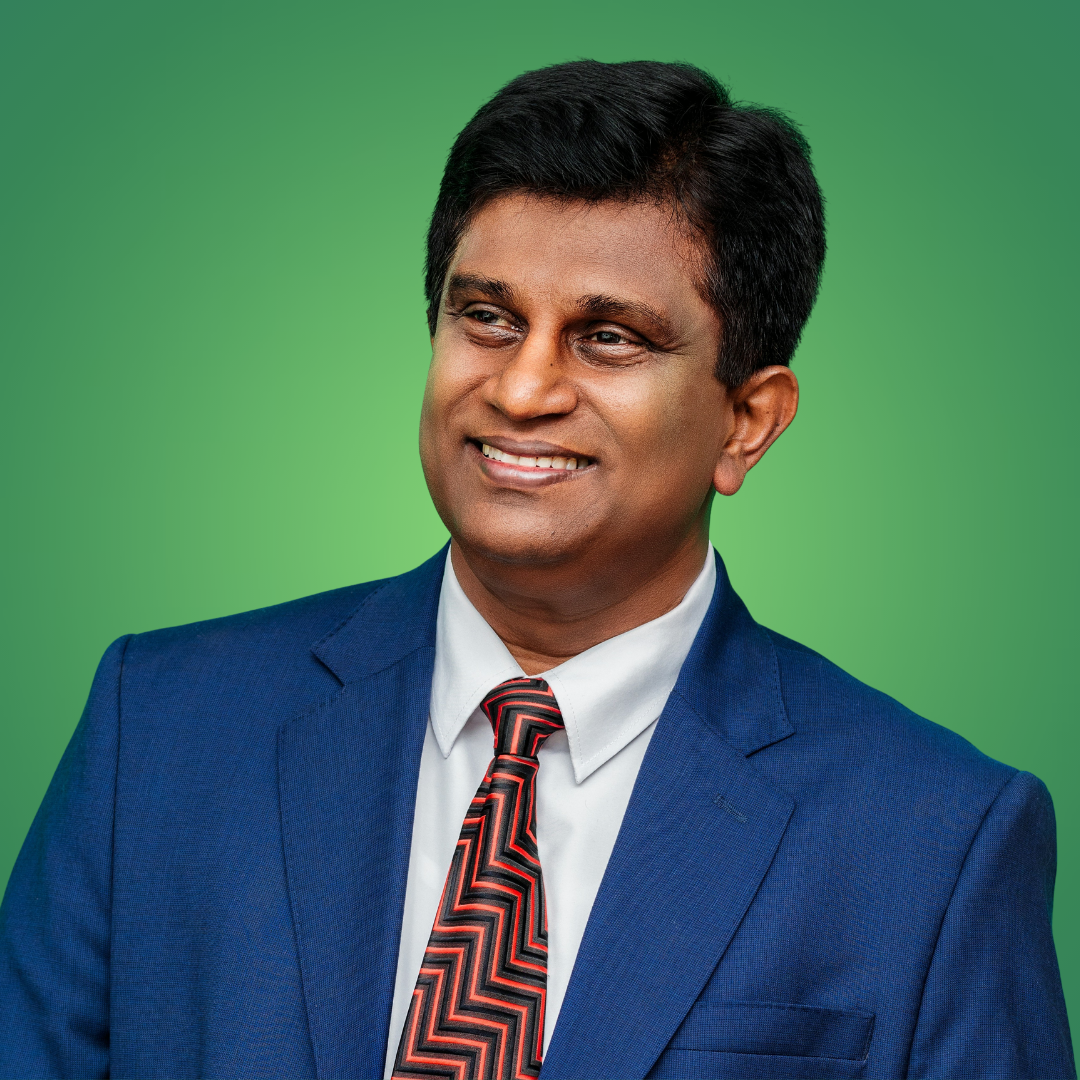
- Ajith P. Perera, prominent Sri Lankan politician, Chief Executive of the Samagi Jana Balawegaya (SJB), and Kalutara District Leader, 2024

Deputy Whip of the Opposition
- In office 2024–present

Minister of Information Technology and Digital Infrastructure
- In office 2018–2020

State Minister of Power and Renewable Energy
- In office 2015–2018

Deputy Minister of Foreign Affairs
- In office 2015–2015

Personal details
- Born: 2 December 1967 (age 58) Bandaragama, Sri Lanka
- Party: Samagi Jana Balawegaya
- Other political affiliations: United National Party (Former)
- Spouse: Nadeeka
- Children: 3
- Education: Ananda College, University of Sri Jayewardenepura, Sri Lanka Law College
- Profession: Attorney-at-Law

Ajith Perera (born 2 December 1967; also known as Ajith P. Perera) is a Sri Lankan politician and member of Parliament. A lawyer by profession, he began his political career in 2009 as a member of the Western Province's Western Provincial Council. He was first elected to the national Parliament of Sri Lanka in 2010 as a member of the United National Party (UNP), representing the Kalutara District. He was re-elected to this position in 2015.

In 2020, Perera was one of the founding members of the Samagi Jana Balawegaya (SJB), currently the main opposition party in Sri Lanka under the leadership of Sajith Premadasa. Within the SJB he holds several key positions, including chief executive, leader of the Kalutara District, chief organiser for the Kalutara Electorate, and a member of the working committee.

Perera re-entered Parliament in 2024, securing the highest number of preferential votes in the Kalutara Electoral District for the SJB. He now serves as the Deputy Whip of the Opposition, and is a member of the Constitutional Council of Sri Lanka.

== Education ==
Born on 2 December 1967 in Bandaragama, a suburban town in the Kalutara District, Perera began his primary education at Wewita Maithree Maha Vidyalaya in Bandaragama. His exceptional performance in the Grade Five Scholarship Examination earned him a place at Ananda College, Colombo, widely regarded as the premier Buddhist school in Sri Lanka. At Ananda he excelled not only in his academic studies but also in debating and athletics, gaining recognition as a well-rounded and accomplished student.

After completing his secondary education he pursued a Bachelor of Science degree in the Faculty of Applied Sciences at the University of Sri Jayawardenapura. During his time at the university he demonstrated strong leadership qualities which saw him elected as a student representative to the Faculty Board.

In 1988 he gained admission to Sri Lanka Law College, where he was a member of the Law Students Union and was elected as speaker of the college's model parliament. He was enrolled as an attorney-at-law of the Supreme Court of Sri Lanka in 1993.

== Legal career ==
Perera's legal career spans over three decades, primarily as a leading counsel in civil and criminal jurisdictions within the Panadura Courts, a suburban area in the Kalutara District. In 2022 he was elected President of the Panadura Bar Association, and was re-elected to a second consecutive term in 2023.

He has also been an active member of the Bar Association of Sri Lanka for the past 25 years.

== Political career ==
=== United National Party (2007–2020) ===
Perera's political career began in 2007 when he was appointed as chief organiser of the Bandaragama electorate by the United National Party (UNP). In 2009 he contested the Western Province Provincial Council election and was elected, securing the highest number of preferential votes in the Kalutara District. In 2010 he was elected to the parliament of Sri Lanka, representing the UNP with 48,558 votes from the Kalutara District.

Perera's parliamentary career with the UNP included several prominent roles: Deputy Whip of the Opposition in 2012; Deputy Whip of the Government in 2015; Chairman of the Sectoral Oversight Committee on Legal Affairs (Anti-Corruption) and Media; a member of the Public Accounts Committee (PAC); and a member of the Committee on Public Enterprises (COPE). In 2015 he was appointed as the deputy minister of foreign affairs and from 2015 to 2018 he served as the state minister of power and renewable energy. From 2018 to 2020 he served as the minister of information technology and digital infrastructure, where he played a key role in modernising the country's digital infrastructure and digital governance frameworks.

Within the UNP, Perera served as a member of the working committee of the Jathika Sevaka Sangamaya, the UNP's main trade union arm, and as the president of Jathika Adyapana Sevaka Sangamaya (JASS), the party's trade union in the education sector.

During his time as the state minister of power and renewable energy in the UNP government, Perera introduced competitive bidding to Sri Lanka's power sector for both the solar and wind energy industries. This policy reform in 2016 set a benchmark in the power sector and contributed significantly to reducing costs and fostering trust in renewable energy projects.

He also led the Soorya Bala Sangramaya (Battle for Solar Energy) initiative, a community-based solar power generation project undertaken in collaboration with the Sri Lanka Sustainable Energy Authority (SLSEA) and launched in 2016. Originally aiming to add 1,000 MW of solar power to the national grid by 2025 and 1,500 MW by 2030, the initiative exceeded expectations, with more than 1,300 MW of solar energy already connected to Sri Lanka's national electricity grid by January 2025. The project provided households, religious places, hotels, and industries with options such as Net metering, Net Accounting, and Net Plus schemes, enabling consumers to generate and utilise solar electricity while selling excess power back to the national grid.

Perera also provided political leadership for several other landmark renewable energy projects, including the 104 MW Thambapavani Wind Farm in Mannar, and the 10 MW Kerawalapitiya waste-to-energy power plant. He also serves as the Chairman of the Smart Energy Council of Sri Lanka.

=== Samagi Jana Balawegaya (2020–present) ===
In 2020 Perera played a role in the founding of the Samagi Jana Balawegaya (SJB) under the leadership of Sajith Premadasa. As the chief executive of the SJB and the Kalutara District leader, he has helped strengthen the party's organisational structure and expanding its influence across the district and beyond.

In 2024 he re-entered Parliament under the SJB banner, winning the highest number of preferential votes in the Kalutara District. He was then appointed as the deputy whip of the opposition and became a member of the Constitutional Council of Sri Lanka.

=== International presence ===
Perera has represented Sri Lanka at various international organisations, including the Inter-Parliamentary Union and the Commonwealth Parliamentary Association (CPA). He has participated in the Westminster Seminar on Parliamentary Practices; contributed to discussions on Truth and Reconciliation in South Africa; addressed global cyberspace issues in the Netherlands, and represented Sri Lanka at conferences on security, energy, and governance in Geneva, Moscow, Bali, and Bangkok.

== Personal life ==
Perera is married to Nadeeka Perera, a government school teacher. They have three children.

== See also ==
- Elections in Sri Lanka
