= Constitutional Council (Sri Lanka) =

National constitutional court

- Incumbent; Jagath Wickramaratne (Chairman); Harini Amarasuriya; Sajith Premadasa; Bimal Rathnayake; Aboobucker Athambawa; Ajith Perera; S. Shritharan; Austin Fernando; Ranjith Ariyaratne; Wasantha Seneviratne
- Reports to: President of Sri Lanka
- Appointer: President of Sri Lanka
- Term length: 3 years, One term limit
- Constituting instrument: 17th & 19th Amendment
- Precursor: Parliamentary Council
- Formation: 2000, 2015

The Constitutional Council (CC) is a 10-member constitutional authority in Sri Lanka tasked with maintaining independent commissions and monitoring its affairs. The Constitutional Council is aimed at depoliticizing the public service.

== History ==
The Constitutional Council was first established in 2000 under the Seventeenth Amendment to the Constitution of Sri Lanka. In 2010 President Mahinda Rajapaksa established the Parliamentary Council, under the Eighteenth Amendment, to replace it. After Maithripala Sirisena was elected President, Prime Minister Ranil Wickremesinghe presented the new reforms to reinstate a new Constitutional Council in 2015 under the Nineteenth Amendment.

The independent commissions were established under the Constitutional Council, fulfilling one of the major promises of the United National Party- led Opposition candidate Maithripala Sirisena during the 2015 presidential election.

== Membership ==
=== Composition ===
The composition of the Constitutional Council consists of ten members, of whom three are ex officio members while the rest are appointed. As per Chapter VIIA, Article 41, of the Nineteenth Amendment to the Constitution of Sri Lanka, members of the council consists of the following:

- (a) the Prime Minister;
- (b) the Speaker of Parliament;
- (c) the Leader of the Opposition;
- (d) one person appointed by the President;
- (e) five persons appointed by the President, on the nomination of both the Prime Minister and the Leader of the Opposition; and
- (f) one person nominated by agreement of the majority of the Members of Parliament belonging to political parties or independent groups, other than the respective political parties or independent groups to which the Prime Minister and the Leader of the Opposition belong, and appointed by the President.

=== Qualification ===
It is the duty of the speaker, as chairman, to ensure that nominations for appointments to the Constitutional Council's appointed seats (the non ex officio members) are made, whenever an occasion for such nominations arise. Members nominated under sub paragraphs d, e or f "shall be persons of eminence and integrity who have distinguished themselves in public or professional life and who are not members of any political party". All appointments made by the President shall be communicated to the Speaker.

Members can vacate the office by resigning in the form of writing addressed to the President or can be removed from office by the President when both the Prime Minister and the Leader of the Opposition have formed the opinion that such member is "physically or mentally incapacitated and is unable to function further in office or is convicted by a court of law for any offence involving moral turpitude or if a resolution for the imposition of civic disability upon him or her has been passed in terms of Article 81 of the Constitution or is deemed to have vacated his or her office under paragraph (7) of Article 41E". The President shall within two weeks, of there being a vacancy of any of the appointed members, appoint another person to succeed that member. The newly appointed member shall hold office for the remainder of the unexpired term of his/her predecessor.

=== Term ===
The Speaker shall continue to hold office as a member of the Council for as long as they continue to occupy the office. The members occupying the seats held by the Prime Minister and the Leader of the Opposition shall continue to hold office as members of the Council for as long as they continue to occupy the office, or until such time after a General Election following such dissolution of parliament. All appointed members shall hold office for a term of three years from the date of appointment. Appointed members are not eligible for reappointment. However members shall continue to hold office on the council until a successor assumes the seat of the vacating member.

=== Members ===
2015-2018

The President and Prime Minister appointed their nominees, Minister Champika Ranawaka (President's nomination), Wijeyadasa Rajapakshe (Prime Minister's nomination) and Vijitha Herath (Parliament's nomination), have been appointed to the council on 9 September 2015.

Appointed members A. T. Ariyaratne, Radhika Coomaraswamy and Shibly Aziz were nominated to the council on 10 September 2015 and were approved by parliament on 22 September 2015.

2018-2021

Appointed members Naganathan Sellvakumaran, Jayantha Dhanapala, and Javed Yusuf was nominated to the council on 19 October 2018.

2020

Jayantha Dhanapala resigned from the council in 2020, after 2020 General election Karu Jayasuriya was replaced by the new speaker Mahinda Yapa Abeywardane as the 2nd chairman. Mahinda Rajapaksa and Sajith Premadasa were elected by their position as Prime Minister and Leader of the Opposition. Mahindananda Aluthgamage was named as the Presidents nomination. In 2020 20th amendment was passed dissolving the council.

2022

In October 2022 Parliament pass the 21st amendment establishing the council back.

Seat No.	Member	Seat	Joined Council	Left Council/ End of term	Party	Notes
1	Jagath Wickramaratne	Speaker	17 December 2024	Incumbent	National People's Power	Chairman
2	Harini Amarasuriya	Prime Minister	24 September 2024	Incumbent	National People's Power	
3	Sajith Premadasa	Leader of the Opposition	5 December 2019	Incumbent	Samagi Jana Balawegaya	
4	Bimal Rathnayake	President's nomination	17 November 2024	Incumbent	National People's Power	
5	S. Sritharan	Parliament nomination	21 November 2024	Incumbent	Ilankai Tamil Arasu Kachchi	
6	Aboobucker Athambawa	Prime Minister's nomination	2025	Incumbent	National People's Power	
7	Ajith Perera	Opposition Leader's nomination	21 November 2024	Incumbent	Samagi Jana Balawegaya	
8	Professor Wasantha Seneviratne	Nominated by the Prime Minister & Leader of Opposition	23 January 2026	Incumbent	Independent	
9	Austin Fernando	Nominated by the Prime Minister & Leader of Opposition	23 January 2026	Incumbent	Independent	
10	Ranjith Ariyaratne	Nominated by the Prime Minister & Leader of Opposition	23 January 2026	Incumbent	Independent	

Former Members

Seat No.	Member	Seat	Joined Council	Left Council/ End of term	Party	Notes
4	Champika Ranawaka	President's nomination	9 September 2015	17 September 2018	Jathika Hela Urumaya	Term Ended.
6	Wijeyadasa Rajapakshe	Prime's Minister's nomination	9 September 2015	28 December 2017	United National Party	Resigned.
6	Tilak Marapana	Prime's Minister's nomination	29 December 2017	22 September 2018	United National Party	Term Ended.
7	John Seneviratne	Opposition Leader's nomination	22 September 2015	22 September 2018	Sri Lanka Freedom Party	Term Ended.
5	Vijitha Herath	Parliament's nomination	22 September 2015	22 September 2018	Janatha Vimukthi Peramuna	Term Ended
8	A. T. Ariyaratne	Nominated by the Prime Minister	22 September 2015	22 September 2018	Independent	Term Ended.
9	Radhika Coomaraswamy	Nominated by the Prime Minister	22 September 2015	22 September 2018	Independent	Term Ended.
10	Shibly Aziz	Nominated by the Prime Minister	22 September 2015	22 September 2018	Independent	Term Ended.
2	Ranil Wickremesinghe	Prime Minister	9 September 2015	26 October 2018	United National Party	Removed from Prime Minister
3	R. Sampanthan	Leader of the Opposition	9 September 2015	18 December 2018	Illankai Tamil Arasu Kachchi	Term Ended after leaving Office.
2	Mahinda Rajapakse	Prime Minister	18 December 2018	11 November 2018	Sri Lanka Freedom Party	Suspended acting as Prime Minister and lost by a No confidence motion.
7	Chamal Rajapaksa	Opposition Leader's nomination	11 October 2018	10 January 2019	Sri Lanka Freedom Party	Resign after Mahinda Rajapakse was apponined Opposition Leader
2	Ranil Wickremesinghe	Prime Minister	26 October 2018	22 December 2019	United National Party	Resigned from post after elections.
3	Mahinda Rajapakse	Leader of the Opposition	18 December 2018	21 November 2019	Sri Lanka Podujana Peramuna	Appointed as Prime Minister
8	Jayantha Dhanapala	Nominated by the Prime Minister	11 October 2018	14 May 2020	Independent	}
1	Karu Jayasuriya	Speaker	9 September 2015	Incumbent	United National Party	Chairman
4	Mahinda Samarasinghe	President's nomination	17 September 2018	25 August 2020	Sri Lanka Freedom Party	
2	Mahinda Rajapakse	Prime Minister	18 November 2020	9 May 2022	Sri Lanka Podujana Peramuna	Resigned as Prime Minister
4	Mahindananda Aluthgamage	President's nomination	18 November 2020	14 July 2022	Sri Lanka Podujana Peramuna	
7	Thalatha Atukorale	Opposition Leader's nomination	11 August 2021	14 November 2022	Samagi Jana Balawegaya	
9	Ahamed Javid Yusuf	Nominated by the Prime Minister	11 October 2018	14 May 2020	Independent	}
10	Naganathan Selvakkumaran	Nominated by the Prime Minister	11 October 2018	14 May 2020	Independent	}
4	Nimal Siripala de Silva	President's nomination	29 November 2022	27 September 2024	Sri Lanka Freedom Party	
2	Dinesh Gunawardena	Prime Minister	22 July 2022	24 September 2024	Mahajana Eksath Peramuna	
6	Sagara Kariyawasam	Prime Minister's nomination	29 November 2022	24 September 2024	Sri Lanka Podujana Peramuna	
7	Kabir Hashim	Opposition Leader's nomination	15 November 2022	17 November 2024	Samagi Jana Balawegaya	
1	Mahinda Yapa Abeywardena	Speaker	20 August 2020	17 November 2024	Sri Lanka Podujana Peramuna	Chairman
1	Asoka Ranwala	Speaker	17 November 2024	12 December 2024	National People's Power	Chairman
4	Vijitha Herath	President's nomination	27 September 2024	17 November 2024	National People's Power	
8	Pratap Ramanujam	Nominated by the Prime Minister & Leader of Opposition	5 January 2023	5 January 2026	Independent	
9	Dilkushi Anula Wijesundere	Nominated by the Prime Minister & Leader of Opposition	5 January 2023	5 January 2026	Independent	
10	Dinesha Samararatne	Nominated by the Prime Minister & Leader of Opposition	5 January 2023	5 January 2026	Independent	

=== Staff ===
The Constitutional Council has the power to appoint officers it deems necessary for its functioning upon such terms and conditions as it may determine.

Secretary General to the Constitutional Council

The Secretary General to the Constitutional Council is appointed, by the Constitutional Council, for a five-year renewable term.

== Functions ==
=== Commissions ===
The following independent commissions were established under the Constitutional Council:

- Election Commission
- Public Service Commission
- National Police Commission
- Audit Service Commission
- Human Rights Commission
- Commission to Investigate Allegations of Bribery or Corruption
- Finance Commission
- Delimitation Commission
- National Procurement Commission

Dr. Deepika Udagama was appointed as the new Chairperson of the Human Rights Commission of Sri Lanka on 20 October 2015. Sri Lanka also appointed members to Public Service Commission and the Police Commission on the same day. Dharmasena Dissanayake has been appointed the Chairman of the Public Service Commission. the Police Commission media unit said today. Justice Titus Bodhipala Weerasuriya was appointed as the Chairman of the Commission to Investigate Allegations of Bribery or Corruption. The President gave approval for the most important independent election commission, former election Mahinda Deshappriya was elected the chairman. By 15, 9 November out of 10 commissions were established with the promise given to the people from the Maithripala Sirisena and United National Party election manifestos in 2015 elections.

=== Political nominations ===
Constitutional Council is responsible of giving their recommendations for high ranking posts of government institutions such as:

- Chief Justice and Judges of the Supreme Court
- President of the Court of Appeal and Judges to the Court of Appeal
- Members of the Judicial Service Commission except its Chairman
- Attorney General
- Auditor General
- Inspector General of Police
- Parliamentary Commissioner for Administration (Ombudsman)
- Secretary General of the Parliament

The first such recommendation was to apportionment Gamini Wijesinghe for the post of Auditor General in November 2015. On 10 February 2016, Constitutional Council has recommended the Senior Solicitor General and President's Counsel Jayantha Jayasuriya for the post of Attorney General.

Making history in Sri Lanka the Constitutional Council met on 18 April 2016 to make a recommendation for the post of Inspector General of Police. It was the first time in Sri Lanka a Constitutional Council with members represented by many political parties were collectively selected an IGP. Senior DIG Pujih Jayasundara was selected by 5 to 2 vote for the post.

== Procedure ==
Nominations

The Constitutional Council give recommendations as to who is to be appointed by the President for the high level political offices stated above. The council nominates and gives consents to one candidate to be appointed to office from the one or more candidates proposed to the council by the President. Candidates are endorsed after debate and a secret ballot, they may or may not appear before the council. Once a final decision has been made the council will inform its decision to the President in writing.

Duties & powers

The council shall submit to the President a report of its activities every three months. It has the power to make rules relating to the performance and discharge of its duties and function. All such rules shall be published in the Gazette and be placed before Parliament.

"Subject to the provisions of Article 126, no court shall have the power or jurisdiction to entertain, hear or decide or call in question, on any ground whatsoever, or in any manner whatsoever, any decision of the Council or any approval or recommendation made by the Council, which decision, approval or recommendation shall be final and conclusive for all purposes."

=== Meetings ===
The Constitutional Council shall meet as frequently as possible when necessary for the performance of its functions, in addition to meeting at least twice a month. A quorum for the meeting of the Constitutional Council is five members. The Speaker shall take the chair of the Constitutional Council, however in his/her absence, the Prime Minister will take over, and in the absence of both the Leader of the Opposition shall take the chair. The Secretary General convenes all meetings of the Constitutional Council, upon the directions of the Chairman.

2015

- 10 September - The first meeting of the new Constitutional Council, held at the official residence of the Speaker, to discuss the appointment of the three Independent members and the appointment of the independent commissions.
- 21 September - Constitutional Council met
- 23 September - Constitutional Council met

== See also ==
- Constitution of Sri Lanka
