= Radhika Coomaraswamy =

Sri Lankan lawyer, diplomat and human rights advocate

Deshamanya Radhika Coomaraswamy
- ராதிகா குமாரஸ்வாமி

United Nations Special Representative for Children and Armed Conflict
- In office April 2006 – 13 July 2012

Constitutional Council (Sri Lanka) as a civil representative
- In office 10 September 2015 – 10 September 2018

Personal details
- Born: 17 September 1953 (age 72) Colombo, Ceylon
- Parent(s): Rajendra Coomaraswamy (father); Wijeyamani (mother)
- Relatives: Indrajit Coomaraswamy (brother)
- Education: Yale University; Harvard University; Columbia University; Amherst College; University of Edinburgh; University of Essex; CUNY School of Law; United Nations International School
- Awards: Deshamanya

Deshamanya Radhika Coomaraswamy (Tamil: ராதிகா குமாரஸ்வாமி; born 17 September 1953) is a Sri Lankan lawyer, diplomat and human rights advocate who served as an Under-Secretary General and Special Representative for Children and Armed Conflict from 2006 to 2012. Secretary-General Kofi Annan appointed her to the position in April 2006. In 1994, she was appointed the United Nations’ Special Rapporteur on Violence Against Women — the first under this mandate. Her appointment marked the first time that violence against women was conceptualized as a political issue internationally.

She co-founded the International Centre for Ethnic Studies (ICES) in 1982. She was nominated to the Constitutional Council (Sri Lanka) as a civil representative on 10 September 2015. In 2017, after atrocities against the Rohingya people, she was appointed a Member of the United Nations Fact Finding Mission on Myanmar.

== Early life and education ==
Coomaraswamy was born on 17 September 1953 in Colombo, Ceylon. She was the younger daughter of civil servant Rajendra Coomaraswamy (Roving Raju) and his wife Wijeyamani. Her father’s occupation at the United Nations meant that her childhood was spent in New York. Her paternal grandfather C. Coomaraswamy was a civil servant and her maternal grandfather S. K. Wijeyaratnam was chairman of Negombo Urban Council. She has one elder brother, Indrajit Coomaraswamy. She is a graduate of the United Nations International School in New York City. She received her B.A. from Yale University, her J.D. from Columbia University, an LLM from Harvard University and honorary PhDs from Amherst College, the Katholieke Universiteit Leuven, the University of Edinburgh, the University of Essex and the CUNY School of Law.

She was also a student of the late United States Supreme Court Justice and pioneer feminist litigator Ruth Bader Ginsburg at Columbia.

== Career ==
Coomaraswamy is a lawyer by training and formerly the Chairperson of the Sri Lanka Human Rights Commission, is an internationally known human rights advocate who has worked as the United Nations Special Rapporteur on Violence against Women (1994-2003).

In her reports to the United Nations Commission on Human Rights, she has written on violence in the family, violence in the community, violence against women during armed conflict and the problem of international trafficking. A strong advocate on women's rights, she has intervened on behalf of women throughout the world seeking clarification from governments in cases involving violence against women. She also compiled a report on "comfort women", citing Seiji Yoshida's remark (his testimony was later judged to be a fabrication), and has conducted field visits to Japan and Korea on the problem of "comfort women", Rwanda, Colombia, Haiti and Indonesia with regard to violence against women in war time, Poland, India, Bangladesh and Nepal on the issue of trafficking, the United States on women in prisons, Brazil on domestic violence, and Cuba on violence against women generally.

=== Appointments ===
Coomaraswamy was appointed Chairperson of the Sri Lanka Human Rights Commission in May 2003. She has served as a member of the Global Faculty of the New York University School of Law. She also taught a summer course at New College, Oxford, every year on the International Human Rights of Women from 1996-2006. She has published, including two books on constitutional law and numerous articles on ethnic studies and the status of women.

In 2014, Coomaraswamy was appointed by UN Secretary-General Ban Ki-Moon as lead author on a Global Study on the implementation of UNSC resolution 1325, on women, peace and security. The Global Study will be presented to the Secretary-General and to the public in October, 2015, when the Security Council will conduct a High-level Review to assess progress at the global, regional and national levels in implementing resolution 1325 (2000).

In January 2008, the United Nations requested that Coomaraswamy, as special representative for children in armed conflict, be allowed to observe the American military tribunal of child soldier Omar Khadr, but she was denied entrance.

In May 2011, Coomaraswamy gave a lecture entitled "Children and Armed Conflict: The International Response" at the University of San Diego's Joan B. Kroc Institute for Peace & Justice Distinguished Lecture Series.

In November 2011, Coomaraswamy gave a lectured entitled "Human Rights: Impact of Armed Conflict on Children" through Monmouth University's Institute for Global Understanding's United Nations Academic Impact Lecture Series.

== Other activities ==
- Open Society Justice Initiative, Member of the Board

== Recognition ==
The President of Sri Lanka conferred on her the title of Deshamanya, a national honour. She has also received the International Law Award of the American Bar Association, the Human Rights Award of the International Human Rights Law Group, the Bruno Kreisky Award of 2000, the Leo Ettinger Human Rights Prize of the University of Oslo, Archbishop Oscar Romero Award of the University of Dayton, the William J. Butler Award from the University of Cincinnati, and the Robert S. Litvack Award from McGill University. In November 2005, in recognition of her service to the country and the world.

== See also ==
- War rape
