= Twentieth Amendment to the Constitution of Sri Lanka =

Constitutional reform of 2020 in Sri Lanka

The 20th Amendment (20A) to the Constitution of Sri Lanka was passed on 22 October 2020 by the 225-member Sri Lankan Parliament. 156 voted in favor, 65 voted against and four abstained from the vote.

The 20th Amendment became a subject of political controversy when political activists, civil societies, and members of the international community expressed concerns over its bias towards the Rajapaksa family. Critics denounced the amendment as a "constitutional bombshell", deeming it a violation of the Constitution of the Democratic Socialist Republic of Sri Lanka.

The amendment reversed most of the reforms and amendments that were introduced by the 19th Amendment to the Constitution of Sri Lanka in 2015. The 20th Amendment reinstated most of the constitutional powers to the President that were previously abolished with the 19th Amendment. The 19th Amendment was the first instance in the country's history where executive power was equally shared by the President and the cabinet.

The 20th Amendment was a frequent political objective of the ruling party Sri Lanka Podujana Peramuna and a core campaign objective of the Gotabaya Rajapaksa administration, which recorded landslide victories in both the 2019 Sri Lankan presidential elections, as well as the 2020 Sri Lankan parliamentary election. On 22 October 2020, the amendment was successfully passed with a two-thirds majority in parliament.

== Background ==
Under the Soulbury Constitution (which consisted of The Ceylon Independence Act of 1947 and The Ceylon Orders in Council 1947), Sri Lanka was then known as Ceylon.

The Soulbury Constitution provided a parliamentary form of Government for Ceylon, a Judicial Service Commission, and a Public Service Commission. Minority rights were safeguarded by Article 29 (2) of the Constitution. The Governor-General, the Senate and the House of Representatives exercised legislative power. The House of Representatives consisted of 101 Members. 95 of the House's members were elected by universal suffrage, and six were nominated by the Governor-General. The total number was increased to 151 by the 1959 Delimitation Commission.

The S. W. R. D. Bandaranaike government set up a joint Select Committee of the Senate and the House of Representatives to consider a revision of the constitution on 10 January 1958, but the Committee was unable to come to a final conclusion due to the prorogation of Parliament on 23 May 1959.

A similar attempt by the Dudley Senanayake Government failed on 22 June 1968, again due to a prorogation of Parliament.

== History ==
=== Drafting ===
The 20th Amendment enhanced the executive powers given to the President, weakening the powers of the Prime Minister's office and the cabinet. Particularly, the president was given the authority to dissolve the parliament after one year, and could use their executive and constitutional powers to appoint any person to a government office in their sole discretion without the need for Parliamentary consent.

The Amendment was widely considered a reversal of the 19th Amendment. The amendment reintroduced policies institutionalized by the 18th Amendment, and some of the reforms of the 1978 constitution. It was earlier announced that the proposed amendment would not require a referendum and could instead be enacted with a two-thirds supermajority among MPs.

=== Timeline ===
On 6 August 2020, Sri Lanka Podujana Peramuna emerged victorious in the parliamentary election. Soon afterward, President Gotabaya Rajapaksa approved the drafting of the 20th Amendment.

The proposed amendment was published in the government gazette and was made publicly available on 3 September 2020. On 22 September 2020, the amendment's draft bill was presented in the parliament for the first reading in front of MPs.

On 22 September 2020, Attorney-at-Law Indika Gallage filed a petition challenging the draft bill in the Supreme Court.

The Supreme Court began hearing petitions on 29 September 2020 against the 20th Amendment. On 2 October 2020, Attorney General Dappula de Livera announced that the Supreme Court would decide whether the 20th Amendment should be passed through a public referendum or a two-thirds majority in parliament.

On 5 October 2020, the Supreme Court concluded oral submissions of petitions challenging the amendment.

On 20 October 2020, the Supreme Court ruled that certain clauses in the amendment required a public referendum instead of a parliamentary supermajority.

A two-day debate on the 20th Amendment to the Constitution was held from 21 October through 22 October, during a meeting of the Committee on Parliamentary Business.

On 21 October 2020, Minister of Justice Ali Sabry presented the original 20th Amendment for the second reading in the parliament.

On 22 October 2020, the bill was passed in the parliament with a two-thirds majority.

=== Supreme Court's ruling ===
The draft amendment was challenged in the Supreme Court on the grounds that certain clauses were inconsistent with Article 3 and Article 4 of the constitution. At least 39 petitions challenging the constitutionality of the amendment were filed by opposition parties, including the Tamil National Alliance and Samagi Jana Balawegaya. On 20 October 2020, the Supreme Court ruled that certain sections of the proposed bill required a referendum to pass.

== Reactions ==
The opposition party Samagi Jana Balawegaya criticised the amendment and deemed the government as paving the way for autocracy instead of democracy. The opposition party leader Sajith Premadasa claimed that the draft bill would not comply with public mandate given to the government and that he would not support the bill in parliament. He also suggested that the government should pass a modern health bill to tackle the second wave of infections due to the COVID-19 pandemic in Sri Lanka instead of passing an "anti-democratic" amendment.

Buddhist sects Amarapura Nikāya and Rāmañña Nikāya released a joint statement decrying the amendment, stating that it would "destroy the independence of the judiciary, the public service, [and] the system of elections while undermining the independence of Parliament and members of Parliament individually". The Catholic Bishops' Conference in Sri Lanka also stated their opposition against the amendment.

Tamil minority political parties, including the Tamil National Alliance, accused the Sri Lankan government of becoming a dictatorship through the passing of the 20th Amendment. Senior political scientist Jayadeva Uyangoda condemned the government decision to pass the amendment, calling it a "constitutional bombshell".
