= Jayantha Dhanapala =

Sri Lankan diplomat (1938–2023)

- ජයන්ත ධනපාල
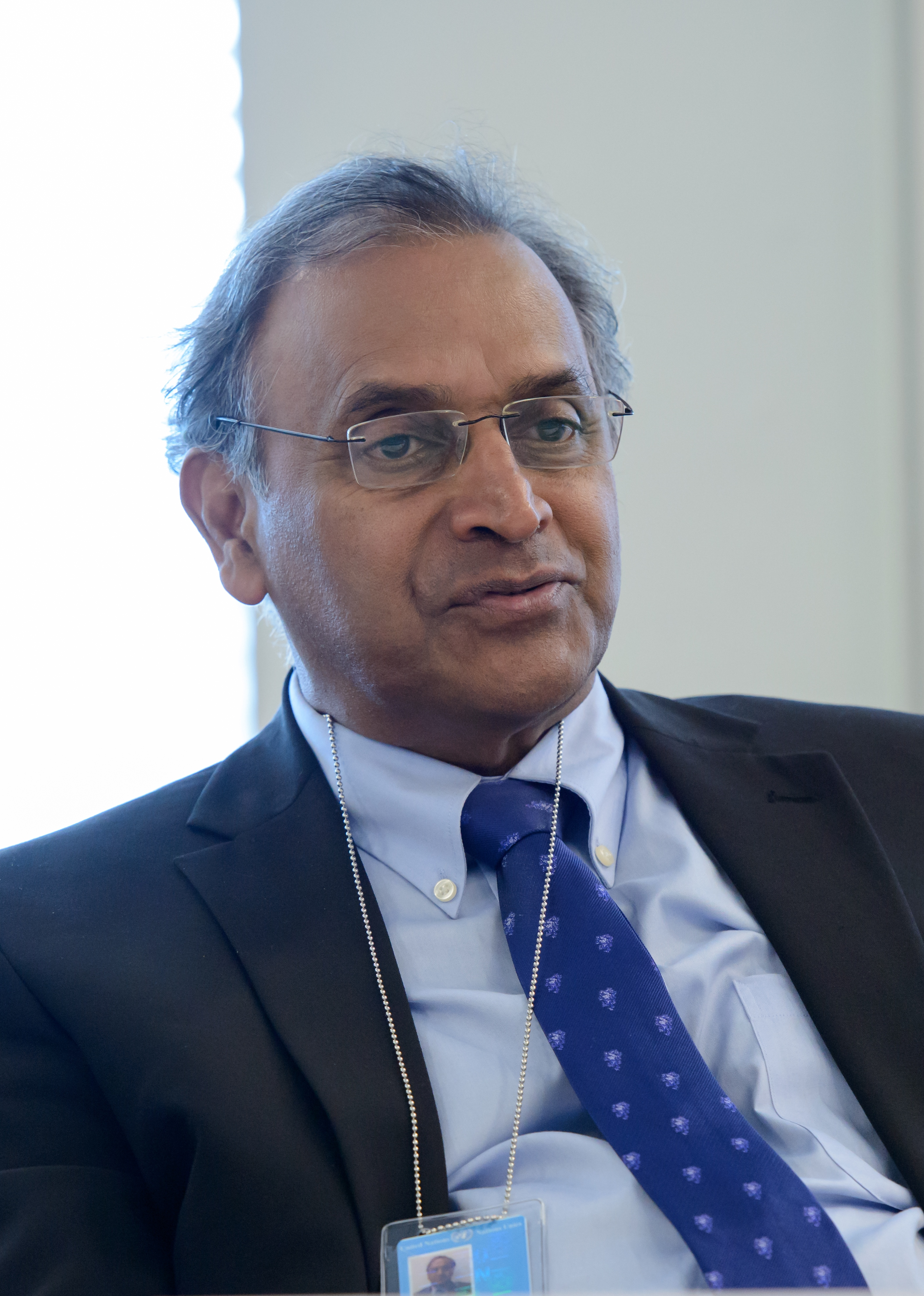
- Dhanapala in 2013

Under-Secretary-General for the Office for Disarmament Affairs
- In office 1998–2003
- Secretary-General: Kofi Annan

Member of the Constitutional Council of Sri Lanka
- In office 11 October 2018 – 14 May 2020
- Appointed by: Ranil Wickremesinghe

Sri Lanka Ambassador to the United States
- In office 1995–1997

Personal details
- Born: 30 December 1938 Colombo, British Ceylon
- Died: 27 May 2023 (aged 84) Kandy, Sri Lanka
- Spouse: Maureen
- Children: 2
- Education: Trinity College, Kandy; University of Peradeniya
- Awards: Sean MacBride Prize
- Website: www.jayanthadhanapala.com

Deshamanya Jayantha Dhanapala (Sinhala: ජයන්ත ධනපාල; 30 December 1938 – 27 May 2023) was a Sri Lankan diplomat. A career diplomat in the Sri Lanka Overseas Service, he served as the Under Secretary General to re-establish the Department of Disarmament from 1998 to 2003; Ambassador and Permanent Representative of Sri Lanka to the UN in Geneva from 1984 to 1987; and Ambassador of Sri Lanka to the United States from 1994 to 1997.

Dhanapala served as member of the Board of Sponsors of The Bulletin of the Atomic Scientists and was a governing board member of the Stockholm International Peace Research Institute. Dhanapala was also a distinguished member of Constitutional Council of Sri Lanka and he was the Senior Special Advisor on Foreign Relations to President Maithripala Sirisena, and was Sri Lanka's official candidate for the post of Secretary-General of the United Nations, before withdrawing from the race on 29 September 2006. From 2007 he was the president of the Pugwash Conferences on Science and World Affairs.

== Early years in Sri Lanka ==
Dhanapala was born in Sri Lanka on 30 December 1938. His family hails from the town of Matale. Dhanapala was educated at Trinity College in Kandy. He gained a reputation as an all-rounder as a schoolboy and was awarded the Ryde Gold Medal in 1956. At the age of 17 Jayantha Dhanapala won a contest with an essay titled "The World We Want". On winning this contest he went to a meeting of youth in a New York Herald Tribune Forum which was later to be renamed as World Youth Forum. When he travelled to the US he met Senator John F. Kennedy and President Dwight D. Eisenhower.

== Diplomatic career ==
He entered the Sri Lanka Overseas Service and served in the Sri Lankan High Commission in London, Beijing, Washington, D.C., New Delhi and Geneva. Dhanapala was appointed Ambassador in Geneva (1984–87)— he was also accredited to the UN and was appointed Sri Lanka's Ambassador to the United States of America based in Washington D.C. from 1995 to 1997.

Dhanapala was widely acclaimed for his presidency of the 1995 Nuclear Non-Proliferation Treaty Review and Extension Conference, a landmark event in disarmament history, because of his crafting of a package of decisions balancing the twin objectives of nuclear non-proliferation and nuclear disarmament and the concerns of the nuclear weapon states and the non-nuclear weapon states which was adopted without a vote. The New York Times observed that Jayantha Dhanapala 'was a diplomat mostly unknown outside the arms-control world until he was elected to preside over this conference.'

== Under-Secretary-General at the UN ==
Dhanapala was hand-picked by UN Secretary-General, Kofi Annan to take on the challenging job of Under Secretary General to re-establish the Department of Disarmament after the UN reforms of 1997, serving from 1998 to 2003. During his tenure, he piloted the UN's role in arresting the proliferation of small arms and light weapons, anti-personnel landmines, conventional weapons, and weapons of mass destruction while reinforcing existing norms and norm-building in other areas such as missiles. He also broke new ground both in-house in taking managerial initiatives in gender mainstreaming and in work-life issues, as well as in the disarmament field by innovating the exchange of weapons for a development programme in Albania and other areas, and also in the cross-sectoral linking of disarmament with development, the environment and peace education programmes.

== Later life ==
Dhanapala was appointed Secretary-General of the Secretariat for Coordinating the Peace Process (SCOPP) in Sri Lanka from 2004–2005. He was also Senior Special Advisor to both Presidents Chandrika Bandaranaike Kumaratunga and Mahinda Rajapakse during the period 2005–2007 and Senior Special Advisor on Foreign Relations to President Maithripala Sirisena, 12 January 2015.

=== Candidate for the post of UN Secretary-General ===
Dhanapala was one of the seven official nominees for the 2006 United Nations Secretary-General selection. In the Security Council straw polls, he received the support from China, Congo, Ghana, Qatar and Tanzania, while Argentina, Denmark, France, Greece, Slovakia and the united Kingdom voted against Dhanapala with Japan, Peru, Russia and the United States remaining neutral. Having stood for three of the four straw polls, he withdrew by the fourth.

== Death ==
Dhanapala died in Kandy on 27 May 2023, at the age of 84.

== Honours and awards ==
Dhanapala was named "the Sri Lankan of the year" by the business magazine LMD in 2006.

- Doctor of Letters honoris causa by the University of Peradeniya, Sri Lanka (2000)
- Doctor of Humane Letters Honoris causa by the Monterey Institute of International Studies, U.S. (2001)
- Doctor of Science in the Social Sciences by the University of Southampton, UK (2003)
- Doctor of Letters (Honoris causa) by the Sabaragamuwa University of Sri Lanka (2003)
- Doctorate (Doctor Honoris Causa) from the Dubna International University of Nature, Society and Man in Russia (2009)
- Sean MacBride Prize – From the International Peace Bureau – Awarded in November, (2007)

== Bibliography ==
- Multilateral Diplomacy and the NPT: An Insider's Account

Jayantha Dhanapala with R. Rydell, Geneva: United Nations Institute for Disarmament Research, 2005

- Regional Approaches to Disarmament, Security and Stability

Jayantha Dhanapala (ed.), Geneva: UNIDIR, 1993, published for UNIDIR by Dartmouth (Aldershot)

- The United Nations, Disarmament and Security: Evolution and Prospects Jayantha Dhanapala (ed.), Geneva: UNIDIR, 1991
- China and the Third World Jayantha Dhanapala, New Delhi: Vikas, 1985
