= Constitution of Sri Lanka =

Sri Lankan Constitution of 1978

Constitution of the Democratic Socialist Republic of Sri Lanka
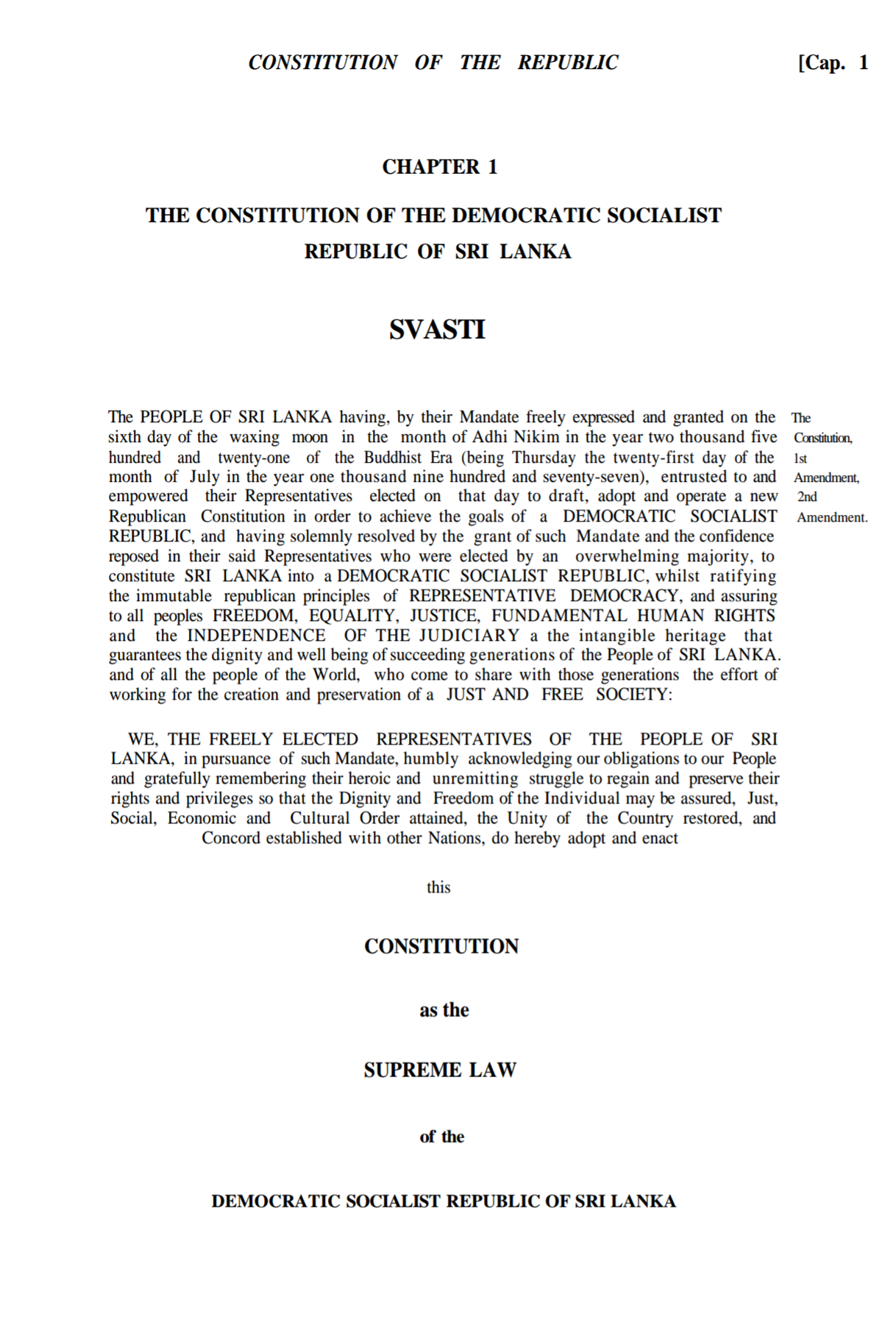
- Page one of the 1978 Constitution

Overview
- Jurisdiction: Sri Lanka
- Ratified: 31 August 1978
- Date effective: 7 September 1978; 48 years ago

History
- Amendments: 21
- Last amended: 21 October 2022
- Author: 8th Parliament of Sri Lanka
- Supersedes: Sri Lankan Constitution of 1972

The Constitution of the Democratic Socialist Republic of Sri Lanka (Sinhala: ශ්‍රී ලංකා ආණ්ඩුක්‍රම ව්‍යවස්ථාව, romanized: Śrī Laṅkā āndukrama vyavasthāva, Tamil: இலங்கைச் சனநாயக சோசலிசக் குடியரசின் அரசமைப்பு, romanized: Ilaṅkaic caṉanāyaka cōcalicak kuṭiyaraciṉ aracamaippu) has been the constitution of the island nation of Sri Lanka since its original promulgation by the National State Assembly on 7 September 1978. As of October 2022 it has been formally amended 21 times.

It is Sri Lanka's second republican constitution, replacing the Sri Lankan Constitution of 1972, its third constitution since the country gained independence within the British Commonwealth as the Dominion of Ceylon in 1948, and its fourth constitution overall.

== Former constitutions of Sri Lanka ==
Donoughmore Constitution

Soulbury Constitution

Under the Soulbury Constitution, which consisted of The Ceylon Independence Act, 1947 and The Ceylon (Constitution and Independence) Orders in Council 1947, Sri Lanka was then known as Ceylon. The Soulbury Constitution provided a parliamentary form of Government for Ceylon and for a Judicial Service Commission and a Public Service Commission. Minority rights were safeguarded by Article 29(2) of the Constitution. The governor-general, the representative of the monarch of Ceylon, the Senate and the House of Representatives exercised legislative power. The House of Representatives consisted of 101 Members, of which 95 were elected by universal suffrage and 6 were nominated by the Governor-General. That total number was increased to 151 by the 1959 Delimitation Commission and the term of the House was five years The S. W. R. D. Bandaranaike Government set up a Joint Select Committee of the Senate and the House of Representatives to consider a revision of the Constitution on 10 January 1958 but the committee was unable to come to a final conclusion on account of the propagation of Parliament on 23 May 1959. A similar attempt by the Dudley Senanayake Government failed due to such a propagation on 22 June 1968 too. The Senate consisted of 30 members (15 elected by the House and 15 by the Governor-General) was abolished on 2 October 1971.

Amendments

- 29 of 1954 on 06.07.1954 to amend section 29(2) to enable enactment of Act Nos.35 & 36 of 1954
- 35 of 1954 on 16.07.1954 to increase the number of Members to 105 for a specified period and to terminate the services of the then existing Delimitation Commissioners.
- 36 of 1954 on 16.07.1954 to make provision for the election of Members of the House of Representatives to represent persons registered as citizens of Ceylon under the Indian and Pakistani Residents (Citizenship) Act No.3 of 1949.
- 4 of 1959 on 06.02.1959 to appoint a Delimitation Commission; to amend section 47 regarding delegation of power to Parliamentary Secretaries and to repeal Act Nos. 35 &36 of 1954.
- 71 of 1961 on 30.12.1961 to include "Election judge" under section 55.
- 8 of 1964 on 12.03.1964 to place the post of Commissioner of Elections in the Constitution and to make financial provision to conduct elections.
- 29 of 1970 on 18.11.1970 to permit public officers (other than those in specified categories) to contest elections, and to make them eligible to be elected or nominated to the Senate.
- 36 of 1971 on 02.10.1971 to abolish the Senate.

Republican Constitution

Sirimavo Bandaranaike came to office as the world's first woman Prime Minister in May 1970. Her United Front Government used the parliament as a Constituent Assembly and drafted a new Republican Constitution. It was promulgated on 22 May 1972. This Constitution provided for a unicameral legislature named the National State Assembly with a term of office of 6 years and Sovereignty was entirely vested in it. A nominal President with a term of office of 4 years was appointed as the Head of State by the Prime Minister, Head of the Cabinet of Ministers responsible to the National State assembly. Ceylon was replaced by republic of Sri Lanka (Resplendent Island). This constitution containing a declaration of fundamental rights and freedom was amended on 11 February 1975 to change the basis of delimitation of constituencies from 75,000 persons per electorate to 90,000 persons. J. R. Jayewardene who came to office in July 1977 with a five-sixths majority passed the second amendment to the 1972 Constitution on 4 October 1977, which made the presidency an Executive post.

Clause 3 of the amendment specifically stated that:

"The person holding the office of Prime Minister at the commencement of this amendment shall assume the office of the President of the Republic and shall exercise and perform the powers and functions pertaining to that office."

Under its provisions, then Prime Minister Jayawardene automatically took office as the first Executive President of Sri Lanka on 4 February 1978.

== Background to the 1978 Constitution ==
Before the 1977 general election, the UNP had sought a mandate from the people to adopt a new constitution. Accordingly, a select committee was appointed to consider the revision of the existing Constitution.

The new Constitution, promulgated on 7 September 1978, provided for a unicameral parliament and an Executive President. The term of office of the president and the duration of parliament were both set at six years. The new Constitution also introduced a form of multi-member proportional representation for elections to parliament, which was to consist of 196 members (subsequently increased to 225 by the Fourteenth Amendment to the Constitution).

The Constitution provided for an independent judiciary and guaranteed fundamental rights, providing for any aggrieved person to invoke the Supreme Court for any violation of their fundamental rights. The Constitution also provided for a Parliamentary Commissioner for Administration (Ombudsman) who could investigate public grievances against government institutions and state officers and give redress. It also introduced anti-defection laws, and referendums on certain bills and on issues of national importance.

== Provisions for amendment ==
Most provisions of the Constitution of Sri Lanka can be amended by a two-thirds majority in Parliament. However, certain entrenched provisions of the Sri Lankan Constitution, such as those concerning the unitary state, sovereignty of the people, national symbols, religion, freedom of thought (Articles 1, 2, 3, 6, 7, 8, 9, 10, 11), and the referendum requirement itself (Article 83), always require both a two-thirds majority in Parliament and approval at a nationwide referendum, as specified in Article 83 of the Constitution.

Articles 30(2) and 62(2), which govern the term limits of the President and Parliament respectively, only trigger a referendum if their terms are being extended to over six years. Reductions in term lengths can be enacted without a referendum.

=== Amendments to date ===
Amendment	Date	Description
First Amendment	20 November 1978	Dealing with jurisdiction of writs to the supreme court related to special circumstances.
Second Amendment	26 February 1979	Dealing with resignations and expulsion of Members of the First Parliament
Third Amendment	27 August 1982	To enable the President to seek re-election after 4 years from the first term.
Fourth Amendment	23 December 1982	Extension of term of first Parliament
Fifth Amendment	25 February 1983	To provide for by-election when a vacancy is not filled by the party
Sixth Amendment	8 August 1983	Prohibition against violation of territorial integrity
Seventh Amendment	4 October 1983	Dealing with Commissioners of the High Court and the creation of Kilinochchi District
Eighth Amendment	6 March 1984	Appointment of President's Counsel
Ninth Amendment	24 August 1984	Relating to public officers qualified to contest elections
Tenth Amendment	6 August 1986	To repeal section requiring two-thirds majority for Proclamation under Public Security Ordinance
Eleventh Amendment	6 May 1987	To provide for a budget for the whole Island; also relating to sittings of the high court. The minimum number of judges at a court of appeal case was amended.
Twelfth Amendment	(Not enacted)	
Thirteenth Amendment	14 November 1987	To make Tamil an official language and English a linking language, and for the establishment of Provincial Councils
Fourteenth Amendment	24 May 1988	Extension of immunity of President; increase of number of Members to 225; validity of referendum; appointment of Delimitation Commission for the division of electoral districts that elects more than 10 members into zones; details of proportional representation; apportionment of the 29 National List Members
Fifteenth Amendment	17 December 1988	To repeal Article 96A to eliminate zones and to reduce the cut-off point to 1/20th
Sixteenth Amendment	17 December 1988	To make provision for Sinhala and Tamil to be Languages of Administration and Legislation
Seventeenth Amendment	3 October 2001	To make provisions for the Constitutional Council of Sri Lanka and Independent Commissions
Eighteenth Amendment	8 September 2010	To remove the sentence that mentioned the limit of the re-election of the President and to propose the appointment of a parliamentary council that decides the appointment of independent posts like commissioners of election, human rights, and Supreme Court judges
Nineteenth Amendment	28 April 2015	To annul the 18th Amendment while replacing the defunct 17th Amendment to establish the Independent Commissions and remove the Executive Presidential powers and limit the term of office of the President to five years while the President continue to function as the Head of State, Head of the Cabinet, and Head of Security Forces
Twentieth Amendment	22 October 2020	To repeal the 19th Amendment
Twenty-first Amendment	21 October 2022	To annul the 20th Amendment to curb the executive powers of the President to some extent and to empower the parliament which should serve on behalf of public interest. Also, aimed to restore independent commissions.
