= Indrajit Coomaraswamy =

Sri Lankan economist and 14th Governor of the Central Bank of Sri Lanka

- இந்திரஜித் குமாரசுவாமி ඉන්ද්‍රජිත් කුමාරස්වාමි
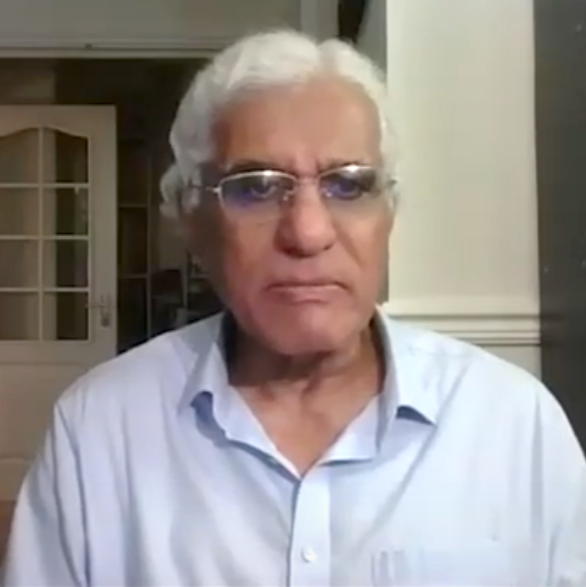
- In a Lowy Institute online discussion in 2023

Governor of the Central Bank of Sri Lanka
- In office 2 July 2016 – 20 December 2019
- Preceded by: Arjuna Mahendran
- Succeeded by: W. D. Lakshman

Personal details
- Born: 3 April 1950 (age 76) Colombo, Ceylon
- Spouse: Tara de Fonseka
- Children: Imran, Arjun
- Parent(s): Rajendra Coomaraswamy (father); Wijeyamani (mother)
- Relatives: Radhika Coomaraswamy (sister)
- Education: Emmanuel College, Cambridge; University of Sussex
- Occupation: Central Bank of Sri Lanka; Commonwealth Secretariat
- Profession: Economist

Deshamanya Indrajit Coomaraswamy (Tamil: இந்திரஜித் குமாரசுவாமி, Sinhala: ඉන්ද්‍රජිත් කුමාරස්වාමි; born 3 April 1950) is a Sri Lankan economist. He served as the 14th Governor of the Central Bank of Sri Lanka.

== Early life and family ==
Coomaraswamy was born on 3 April 1950 in Colombo, Ceylon. He was the son of civil servant Rajendra Coomaraswamy (Roving Raju) and Wijeyamani. His paternal grandfather C. Coomaraswamy was a civil servant and his maternal grandfather S. K. Wijeyaratnam was chairman of Negombo Urban Council. He has one sister, Radhika. Coomaraswamy was educated at Royal College, Colombo and at Harrow School in England. He was captain of Royal's primary cricket team. He was captain of Harrow's cricket team from 1967 to 1968 and also played rugby for the school for three years.

After school he went to Emmanuel College, Cambridge, from where he received BA (Hons) and MA degrees. He played two matches of first-class cricket for Cambridge University Cricket Club, one in 1971 and one in 1972. He then proceeded to the University of Sussex from where he obtained a DPhil degree.

Coomaraswamy is married to Tara de Fonseka. They have two sons – Imran and Arjun. Coomaraswamy is a Sri Lankan Tamil.

== Career ==
Coomaraswamy joined the Central Bank of Sri Lanka in 1973, working as a staff officer in its Economic Research, Statistics and Bank Supervision divisions until 1989. He was seconded to the Ministry of Finance and Planning between 1981 and 1989 to provide advice on macroeconomic issues and structural reforms. He worked at the Commonwealth Secretariat from 1990 to 2008, holding various posts including Chief Officer, Economics in the International Finance and Markets Section; Director of the Economic Affairs Division; and Deputy-Director of the Secretary-General's Office. He was an advisor to Prime Minister Ranil Wickremesinghe and Project Minister of Economic Reforms, Science and Technology Milinda Moragoda between 2001 and 2002.

Coomaraswamy rejoined the Commonwealth Secretariat in 2010 as Interim Director of its Social Transformation Programme Division. He was special advisor to the controversial Galleon Group hedge fund. He was director of a British company called Galleon Research Services Limited, a wholly owned subsidiary of Galleon International Management LLC. He was appointed as a non-executive director of John Keells Holdings PLC in February 2011. He was appointed as a director of Tokyo Cement Group in March 2011. He worked briefly for Hatton National Bank and was a director of SEEDS (Guarantee) Limited. He was a member of the University of Sri Jayewardenepura's Board of Study (Public Administration) and a director of Nawaloka College of Higher Studies. He was later a senior advisor to Minister of Development Strategies and International Trade Malik Samarawickrama.

Coomaraswamy was appointed Governor of the Central Bank of Sri Lanka in July 2016, replacing Arjuna Mahendran whose tenure was mired by allegations of corruption. He resigned from the position in December 2019.

== Sports career ==
Coomaraswamy played rugby for Ceylonese Rugby & Football Club and captained the national team in the 1974 Rugby Asiad. He also played cricket for the Tamil Union Cricket and Athletic Club.
