= Sajith Premadasa =

Sri Lankan politician (born 1967)

Hon. Sajith Premadasa MP
- සජිත් ප්‍රේමදාස சஜித் பிரேமதாச
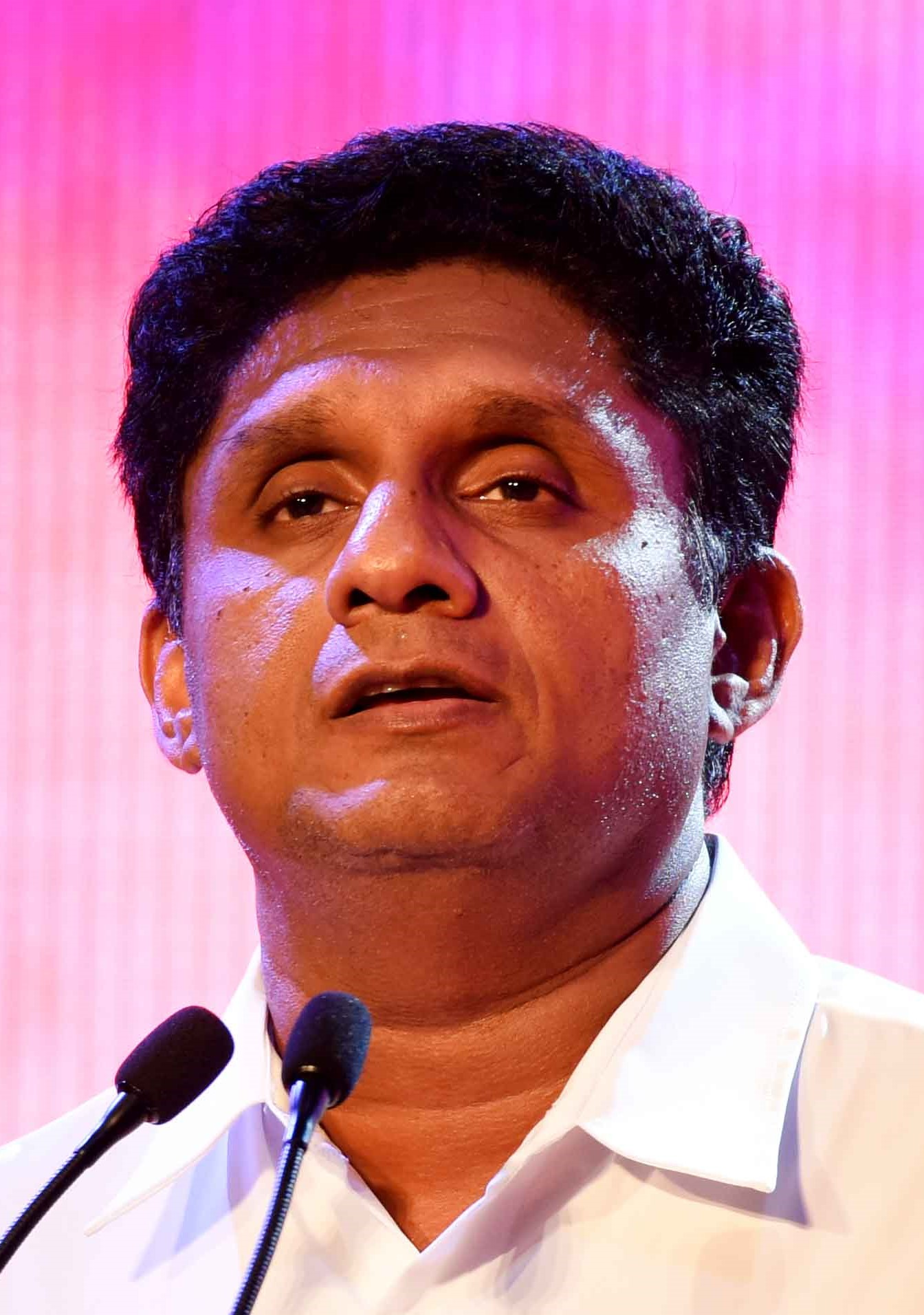
- Sajith in 2016

15th Leader of the Opposition
- Incumbent
- Assumed office 3 January 2020
- President: Gotabaya Rajapaksa; Ranil Wickremesinghe; Anura Kumara Dissanayake
- Prime Minister: Mahinda Rajapaksa; Ranil Wickremesinghe; Dinesh Gunawardena; Harini Amarasuriya
- Preceded by: Mahinda Rajapaksa

Leader of the Samagi Jana Balawegaya
- Incumbent
- Assumed office 11 February 2020
- Preceded by: Position Established

Minister of Housing, Construction and Cultural Affairs
- In office 20 December 2018 – 17 November 2019
- President: Maithripala Sirisena
- Prime Minister: Ranil Wickremesinghe
- Preceded by: Wimal Weerawansa
- Succeeded by: Mahinda Rajapaksa
- In office 12 January 2015 – 26 October 2018
- President: Maithripala Sirisena
- Prime Minister: Ranil Wickremesinghe
- Preceded by: Wimal Weerawansa
- Succeeded by: Wimal Weerawansa

Deputy Minister of Health
- In office 2001–2004
- President: Chandrika Kumaratunga
- Prime Minister: Ranil Wickremesinghe

Member of Parliament for Colombo District
- Incumbent
- Assumed office 20 August 2020
- Majority: 145,611 Preferential Votes

Member of Parliament for Hambantota District
- In office 18 October 2000 – 3 March 2020
- Majority: 112,645 Preferential Votes

Deputy Leader of the United National Party
- In office 2014–2020
- Preceded by: Karu Jayasuriya
- Succeeded by: Ruwan Wijewardene
- In office 2011–2013
- Preceded by: Karu Jayasuriya
- Succeeded by: Karu Jayasuriya

Member of the Constitutional Council
- Incumbent
- Assumed office 29 October 2020
- President: Gotabaya Rajapaksa; Ranil Wickremesinghe; Anura Kumara Dissanayake
- Prime Minister: Mahinda Rajapaksa; Ranil Wickremesinghe; Dinesh Gunawardena; Harini Amarasuriya

Personal details
- Born: 12 January 1967 (age 59) Colombo, Dominion of Ceylon
- Party: Samagi Jana Balawegaya (after 2020)
- Other political affiliations: United National Party (before 2020)
- Spouse: Jalani Premadasa (m. 1999)
- Children: One
- Parent(s): Ranasinghe Premadasa; Hema Premadasa
- Education: London School of Economics; University of Maryland
- Profession: Politician
- Website: Official website

Sajith Premadasa (Sinhala: සජිත් ප්‍රේමදාස, Tamil: சஜித் பிரேமதாச; born 12 January 1967) is a Sri Lankan politician. He is the current Leader of the Opposition of Sri Lanka and a Member of Parliament for the Colombo District. He is the current leader of the Samagi Jana Balawegaya.

Sajith Premadasa is the son of Ranasinghe Premadasa, president of Sri Lanka from 1989 to 1993. He was educated at S. Thomas' Preparatory School, Royal College, Colombo and Mill Hill School before entering the London School of Economics. He was doing his postgraduate studies at the University of Maryland when his father was assassinated in 1993.

Following his father's assassination, he returned to Sri Lanka and entered politics. He was elected to parliament in 2000, representing the Hambantota District as a member the United National Party, his father's party, and was appointed Deputy Minister of Health in 2001, serving until 2004. He was appointed deputy leader of the UNP in 2011 and was appointed Minister of Housing and Samurdhi in President Maithripala Sirisena's cabinet in 2015.

Premadasa contested the 2019 presidential election as the candidate of New Democratic Front, placing second. In December 2019, he was appointed as Leader of the Opposition and a member of the Constitutional Council of Sri Lanka. In 2020, Premadasa split from the UNP to lead his own political party, the Samagi Jana Balawegaya, and ran in the 2020 parliamentary elections as the leader and prime ministerial candidate of the new alliance. In 2024, Premadasa ran for president a second time, once again finishing in second place.

== Early life and education ==
Sajith Premadasa was born on 12 January 1967 in Colombo to Ranasinghe Premadasa, who was Minister of Broadcasting and a Member of Parliament from the Colombo District at the time, and his wife Hema Premadasa. He had one sister, Dulanjali. His father was elected as the President of Sri Lanka in 1988, having served as Prime Minister from 1977 to 1989.

Sajith Premadasa was schooled at S. Thomas' Preparatory School and Royal College, he sat for his ordinary (O/L) and advanced level (A/L) examination at Mill Hill School, London. Premadasa won the A/L prize for politics and business studies and besides being appointed a prefect, also played in the first 11 cricket team for four years, captaining the side in 1986. A graduate of the London School of Economics (LSE) and the University of London, his aegrotat degree covered the areas of economics, politics and international relations. He interned in the Foreign Relations Committee under US Senator Larry Pressler, a Republican from South Dakota. Premadasa met many other influential senators, including John McCain and 2004 presidential candidate John Kerry. Whilst completing his master's degree in the United States at the University of Maryland, College Park, he returned to Sri Lanka following his father's assassination.

== Political career ==
Sajith Premadasa entered Sri Lankan politics following the assassination of his father in 1993. Having joined his father's party, the United National Party, he was appointed district organiser of the UNP for the Hambantota District in 1994, where he launched several projects for poverty alleviation and housing development. He initiated the youth movement Tharuna Saviya, the People Development Foundation Jana Suwaya for poverty alleviation in Hambantota, and the Sasunata Aruna to aid Buddhist temples and Sunday schools in line with the 2600 Sambuddhathwa Jayanthi celebrations.

=== Parliament (2000–2019) ===
In the 2000 general election, Sajith Premadasa contested from the Hambantota district. He was elected and entered parliament, gaining 83% of the UNP preferential votes. He won 82% of the preferential votes in the 2001 general election, 84% in the 2004 general election, 89% in the 2010 general election and 86% in the 2015 general election.

He was appointed as the Deputy Minister of Health under the premiership of Ranil Wickremesinghe in 2001 and remained until 2004 when the Wickremesinghe government was dissolved by President Chandrika Kumaratunga.

For the fourth general election in a row in 2010, Premadasa won the highest percentage of preferential votes out of all UNP candidates, which was just under 90% of all United National Party votes in the Hambantota Electoral District. Premadasa was elected as the deputy leader of the United National Party in 2011, but was removed from the position in 2013. He was later reappointed on 24 September 2014.

==== Minister of Housing and Samurdhi ====
Following the 2015 presidential election, Sajith Premadasa was appointed Minister of Housing and Samurdhi in the new cabinet formed in January 2015 by President Maithripala Sirisena. As housing minister, Premadasa initiated several national housing projects for lower and middle-income families. These include Gamudawa, Jalthara Green Valley apartments, and Mount Clifford, Homagama. As Samurdhi minister, he increased the Samurdhi payment by twofold. With the addition of construction to his portfolio, he initiated the Shelter For All 2025 objective and provided over 65,000 houses to low-income families and initiated 2500 villages.

==== 2019 presidential election ====
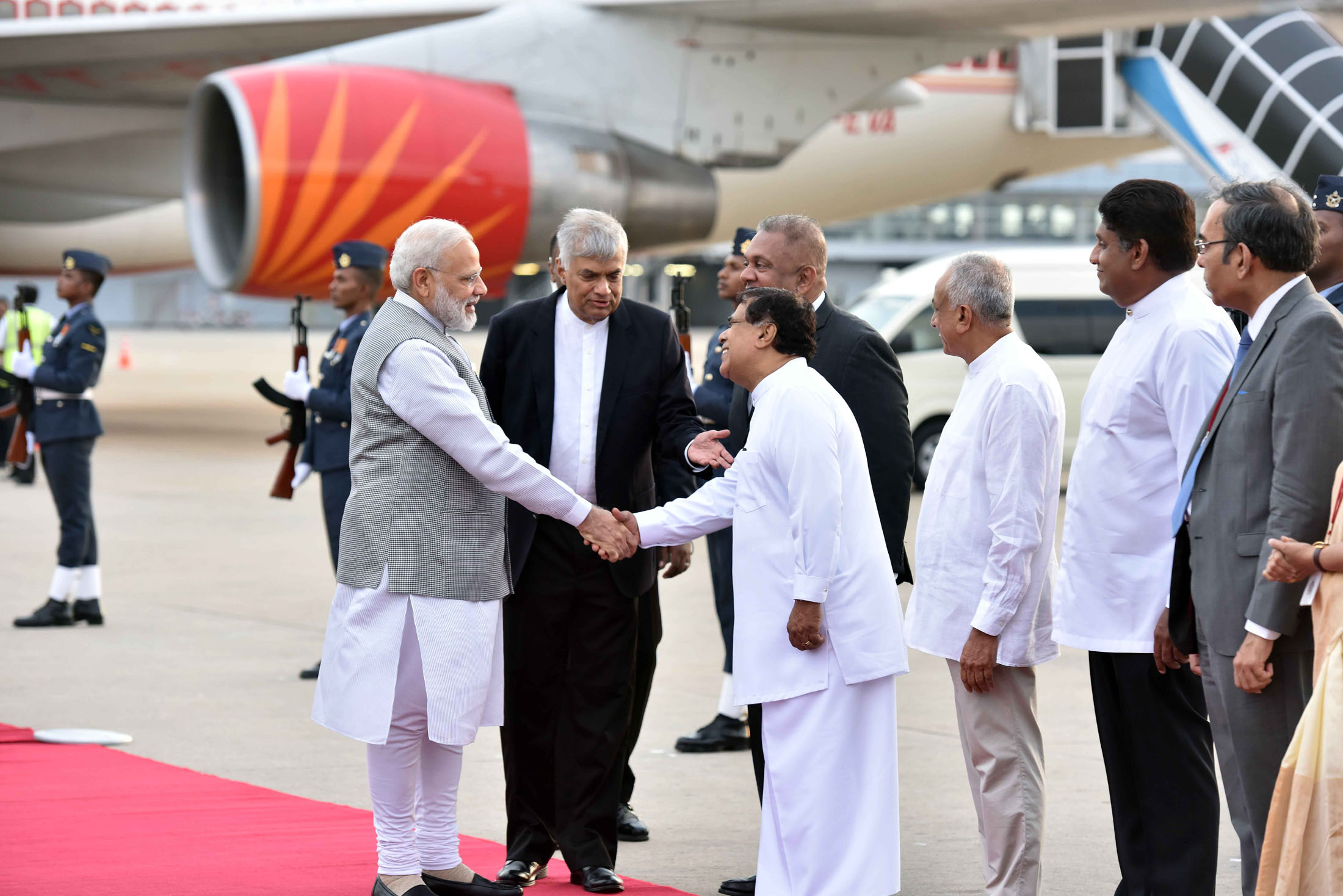
Sajith awaits to greet Indian prime minister Narendra Modi in 2017

The United National Party did not field a presidential candidate in both the 2010 and 2015 elections and instead endorsed a common candidate. Even though they won the 2015 election and elected Maithripala Sirisena through their support, relations between the president and the UNP had been shaky from the beginning. The power struggle between the president and UNP prime minister Ranil Wickremesinghe led to the 2018 Sri Lankan constitutional crisis. In the aftermath of the events, most of the UNP members publicly expressed their regret for supporting a common candidate in 2015 and promised to field their own presidential candidate in the 2019 elections.

UNP leader Ranil Wickremesinghe was the obvious choice for the candidacy and he reportedly expressed his intentions to run for the presidency in a meeting with other senior members. Meanwhile, several rebel MPs including Mangala Samaraweera, Harin Fernando, Ajith Perera, Harsha de Silva, Sujeewa Senasinghe wanted deputy leader Premadasa as the party's candidate and organised a rally in Badulla where Premadasa openly expressed his intentions to be the UNP candidate.

With the growing support for Premadasa and party leader Wickremesinghe refusing to make a move, Speaker of the parliament Karu Jayasuriya released a statement signaling his intention to run for presidency to end the confusion and avoid a rift within the party. The Premadasa faction gained strong support from fellow party members through successful rallies in Matara, Kurunegala and Matugama. Eventually, Premadasa was picked as the UNP's candidate for the election.

Premadasa was defeated by SLPP candidate Gotabaya Rajapaksa, who campaigned on a pro-nationalistic, economic development and national security platform. Rajapaksa received 6,924,255 votes (52.25% of the total votes) and a 1,360,016 vote majority over Premadasa, who polled 41.99% of the total votes. Rajapaksa won a majority in the predominantly Sinhalese areas of the island. At the same time, Premadasa gained a majority in areas dominated by Tamil and Muslim minorities, whom had been greatly affected by the country's civil war. Following the election, Premadasa stepped down from all ministerial portfolios and posts, including the post of Deputy Leader of the United National Party.

=== Leader of the Opposition (2019–present) ===
On 5 December 2019, he was nominated as the leader of the opposition and was officially named by the speaker on 3 January 2020. With his appointment as Leader of Opposition, he was automatically given a seat as a Member of Constitutional Council (Sri Lanka).

==== 2020 parliamentary election and split from the UNP ====
Premadasa was selected by his party as the prime ministerial candidate of the UNP on 30 January 2020. He was named the leader of the alliance after a majority of party front liners backed him over UNP leader Ranil Wickremesinghe. He was appointed as the leader of the newly formed Samagi Jana Sandhanaya led by the Samagi Jana Balawegaya to contest in the 2020 parliamentary elections.

==== 2022 Sri Lankan political crisis ====
Premadasa refused an invitation by President Gotabaya Rajapaksa to accept the premiership during the 2022 Sri Lankan political crisis. Following the resignation of Rajapaksa, he initially announced to run as a candidate for president in the indirect presidential election. However, the day before the election, he withdrew his candidacy and endorsed Dullas Alahapperuma.

==== 2024 presidential election ====
Premadasa contested the 2024 presidential election as the candidate of Samagi Jana Balawegaya, against his former leader and incumbent president Ranil Wickremesinghe, and Anura Kumara Dissanayake, leader of National People’s Power.

Premadasa came second behind Dissanayake with 4,363,035 (32.76%) votes in the first count of votes while Dissanayake gained 5,634,915 (42.31%) votes. Since no candidate was able to secure a majority, a second count of preferential votes was held between Dissanayake and Premadasa. However, despite gaining 167,867 additional preference votes, Premadasa trailed behind Dissanayake, who won the election with 5,740,179 (55.89%) votes at the end of the second vote count. Premadasa remained in 2nd with 4,530,902 (44.11%) votes, thus losing his second bid for presidency.

== Electoral history ==
Presidential Elections
Year	Constituency	Position	Party	Alliance	Votes	%	±	Result
2019	Sri Lanka	President	United National Party	New Democratic Front	5,564,239	41.99%	41.99	Lost
2024	Sri Lanka	President	Samagi Jana Balawegaya	Samagi Jana Sandhanaya	4,363,035	32.76%	▼9.23	Lost

Parliamentary Elections
Year	District	Position	Party	Alliance	Votes	%	±	Result
2000	Hambantota District	Member of Parliament	United National Party		98,968	83.11%	83.11	Elected
2001	Hambantota District	Member of Parliament	United National Party	United National Front	92,536	82.23%	▼0.88	Elected
2004	Hambantota District	Member of Parliament	United National Party	United National Front	82,968	83.91%	▲1.68	Elected
2010	Hambantota District	Member of Parliament	United National Party	United National Front	74,467	89.69%	▲5.78	Elected
2015	Hambantota District	Member of Parliament	United National Party	UNF for Good Governance	112,649	86.36%	▼3.33	Elected
2020	Colombo District	Member of Parliament	Samagi Jana Balawegaya	Samagi Jana Sandhanaya	305,744	78.97%	78.97	Elected
2024	Colombo District	Member of Parliament	Samagi Jana Balawegaya	Samagi Jana Sandhanaya	145,611	69.92%	▼9.05	Elected

== See also ==
- List of political families in Sri Lanka

Political offices
Preceded by Mahinda Rajapaksa	Leader of the Opposition; 2019–Present	Incumbent
