= Prasanna Jayawardena =

Sri Lankan judge (1956–2019)

Prasanna Jayawardena PC

Puisne Justice of the Supreme Court of Sri Lanka
- In office 16 June 2016 – 24 December 2019
- Appointed by: Maithripala Sirisena

Personal details
- Born: 10 March 1956
- Died: 24 December 2019 (aged 63) Colombo, Western Province, Sri Lanka
- Education: University of Colombo
- Profession: Lawyer

Prasanna Sujeewa Jayawardena, PC (10 March 1956 – 24 December 2019) was a Sri Lankan judge and lawyer. He was a puisne justice of the Supreme Court of Sri Lanka.

== Career ==
Jayawardena was educated at the Royal College, Colombo and the University of Colombo, graduating in 1978 with an LL.B. (Honours). He worked briefly as a research officer in the legal research division of Marga Institute, headed by Dr Neelan Tiruchelvam, PC. In 1979, he joined HSBC as an Executive Management Trainee, serving in many positions in Sri Lanka and overseas until 1989.

He passed his attorneys final examination at the Sri Lanka Law College with a class and apprenticed under B.J. Fernando, PC. When Fernando retired in 1991, Jayawardena started his own practice, specializing in civil law, in the areas of commercial, banking, company, industrial and intellectual property law; appearing in the Commercial High Courts, District Courts, Court of Appeal and Supreme Court. He was appointed a President's Counsel in 2012. An active member of the Bar Association of Sri Lanka he served as its Deputy President in 2013 and 2014. He was also a visiting lecturer in Commercial Law at the Faculty of Law of the University of Colombo and at the Institute of Advanced Legal Studies.

=== Supreme Court ===
Jayawardena was appointed to the Supreme Court as a judge by President Maithripala Sirisena in June 2016. In January 2017, he was appointed by President Sirisena to a three member Special Presidential Commission of Inquiry in the investigate the Bond Issuance at the Central Bank of Sri Lanka, which published its report in December 2017.

== Personal life ==
Jayawardena died at the age of 63 on 24 December 2019 while receiving medical treatment at a hospital in Colombo. He was married and had three children.
