= Committee on Public Enterprises (Sri Lanka) =

Parliamentary committee of Sri Lanka

The Committee On Public Enterprises (COPE) is a parliamentary committee established on July 21, 1979, by the Parliament of Sri Lanka.

== Mission ==
The intention of the committee is to ensure the compliance of financial discipline in Public Corporations and other Semi Governmental bodies in which the Government of Sri Lanka has a financial stake.

== Structure ==
COPE consists of 31 Members reflecting the party composition in the House established under the Standing Order 126 at the beginning of each Parliamentary Session and the Chairman is elected by the Members of the Committee at its first session. Its quorum is four.

== Past chairpersons ==
- George Abeygunasekera, M.P.
- M. S. Amarasiri, M.P.
- John Amaratunga, M.P.
- Wimal Wickramasinghe, M.P.
- Rohan Abeygunasekera, M.P.
- D. P. Wickremasinghe, M.P.
- Prof. W. A. Wiswa Warnapala, M.P.
- Reggie Ranatunga, M.P.
- Jeyaraj Fernandopulle, M.P.
- Rohitha Bogollagama, M.P.
- Wijeyadasa Rajapakshe, M.P.
- W. D. J. Senewiratne, M.P.
- D. E. W. Gunasekera, M.P.
- Sunil Handunnetti, M.P.
- Ranjith Bandara, M.P.
- Rohitha Abeygunawardena, M.P.
