= Aitken Spence =

Sri Lankan conglomerate

Aitken Spence PLC
- Logo of Aitken Spence PLC
- Type: Public
- Traded as: CSE: SPEN.N0000
- ISIN: LK0004N00008
- Industry: Tourism (Hotels, Destination Management, Airline GSA); Maritime and Freight Logistics ( Maritime & Port Services, Freight Forwarding & Courier, Airline GSA (Cargo), Education, Integrated Container Services); Strategic Investments (Printing & Packaging, Plantations, Power Generation); Services (Insurance, Money Transfer, Property Management, Elevators, BPO Services)
- Founded: 1 September 1868; 158 years ago
- Founder: Patrick Gordon Spence; Thomas Clark; Edward Aitken; S. R. Aitken
- Headquarters: Colombo, Sri Lanka
- Area served: Sri Lanka; Maldives; Bangladesh; India; Oman; Fiji; Mozambique; Myanmar; Singapore; United Arab Emirates; Cambodia; British Virgin Islands
- Key people: Stasshani Jayawardena (Chairman/Chairperson & Interim Managing Director); Dr. Rohan Fernando (Executive Director)
- Number of employees: ▲20,000+ (2026)
- Parent: Melstacorp
- Subsidiaries: Aitken Spence Hotel Holdings
- Website: aitkenspence.com

Aitken Spence PLC (Sinhala: එයිට්කින් ස්පෙන්ස්; Tamil: எய்ட்கின் ஸ்பென்ஸ்) is a Sri Lankan blue chip conglomerate listed on the Colombo Stock Exchange since 1983. It operates within 4 sectors: Tourism (Hotels, Destination Management, Airline GSA), Maritime and Freight Logistics ( Maritime & Port Services, Freight Forwarding & Courier, Airline GSA (Cargo), Education, Integrated Container Services), Strategic Investments (Printing & Packaging, Plantations, Power Generation), Services (Insurance, Money Transfer, Property Management, Elevators, BPO Services). Aitken Spence is internationally present in over 10 countries across South Asia, Middle East, Africa and Pacific.

Aitken Spence has been recognised by Forbes as one of the most successful publicly traded companies with annual sales under US$1 billion outside of United States, for three consecutive years. In 2017, 2018 and 2019, Aitken Spence was adjudged the top winner of the Best Corporate Citizen Sustainability Award presented by the Ceylon Chamber of Commerce. The company is one of the first signatories to the UN's Global Compact in Sri Lanka. Aitken Spence is the first diversified holdings company in Sri Lanka to have its near-term targets validated by the Science Based Targets Initiative (SBTi).

In February 2025, Stasshani Jayawardena was appointed as the chairperson of Aitken Spence.

== History ==
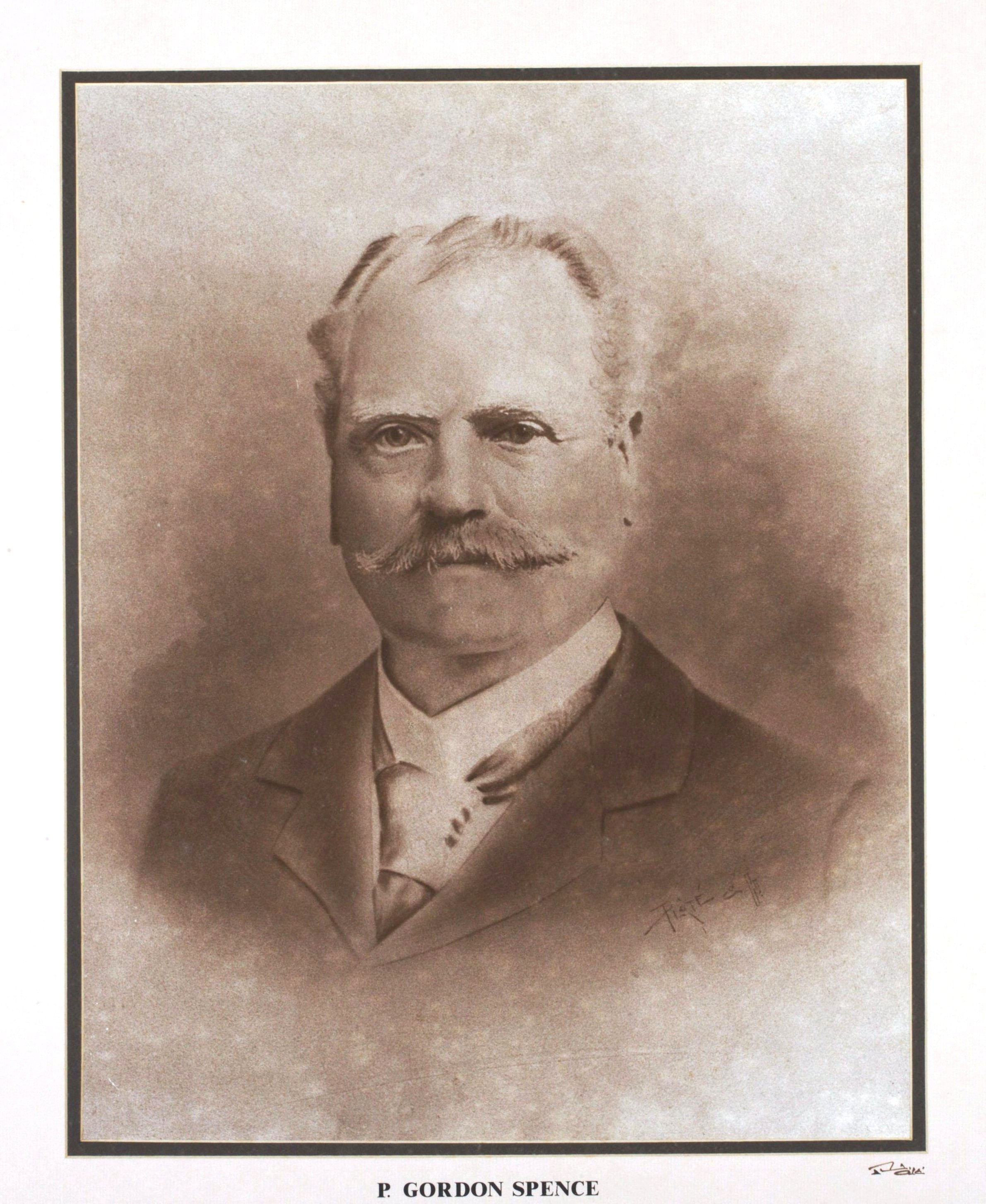
Patrick G. Spence

Whilst the roots of Aitken Spence can be dated back to Wilson & Archer Partnership of the 1830s in the early British Colonial Ceylon, the company began to take its current form after the signing of a formal partnership agreement between Thomas Clark and Patrick Gordon Spence—Scottish merchants and shipping agents in Galle—on 1 September 1868, wherein Clark Spence & Co. was established. Clark Spence & Co.'s trading segment at this stage included exports of natural vein graphite (plumbago), gems, hides, sappan wood, ebony, coffee, coconut oil, coir, arrack, and citronella oil to the United Kingdom, continental Europe, the United States and Australia; and imports of Burmese rice, and coal for steamship bunkers.

On 5 April 1871, Patrick Gordon Spence secured Clark Spence & Co. as the sole agent of Lloyd's of London in Ceylon. In order to service the agency for the Lloyd's of London for the Port of Colombo, Clark Spence & Co. partnered with Britton, Aitken & Co. to open a branch office in Colombo. On New Year's Day, 1873, E.C. Britton opted out of the Britton, Aitken & Co. partnership, resulting in Patrick Gordon Spence, Edward Aitken and S.R. Aitken coming together to form Aitken Spence & Co. to manage the operations in Colombo, whilst Clark Spence & Co. continued in partnership to operate in Galle. In 1876, Aitken Spence & Co. obtained the Lloyd's agency from Clark Spence & Co. Aitken Spence had also obtained the local agency of the Morgan Crucible Company for trading in plumbago. As Colombo became the commercial capital of Sri Lanka, Aitken Spence & Co became more prominent and subsequently its partner company, Clark Spence & Co. originally based in Galle, became a subsidiary of Aitken Spence & Co.

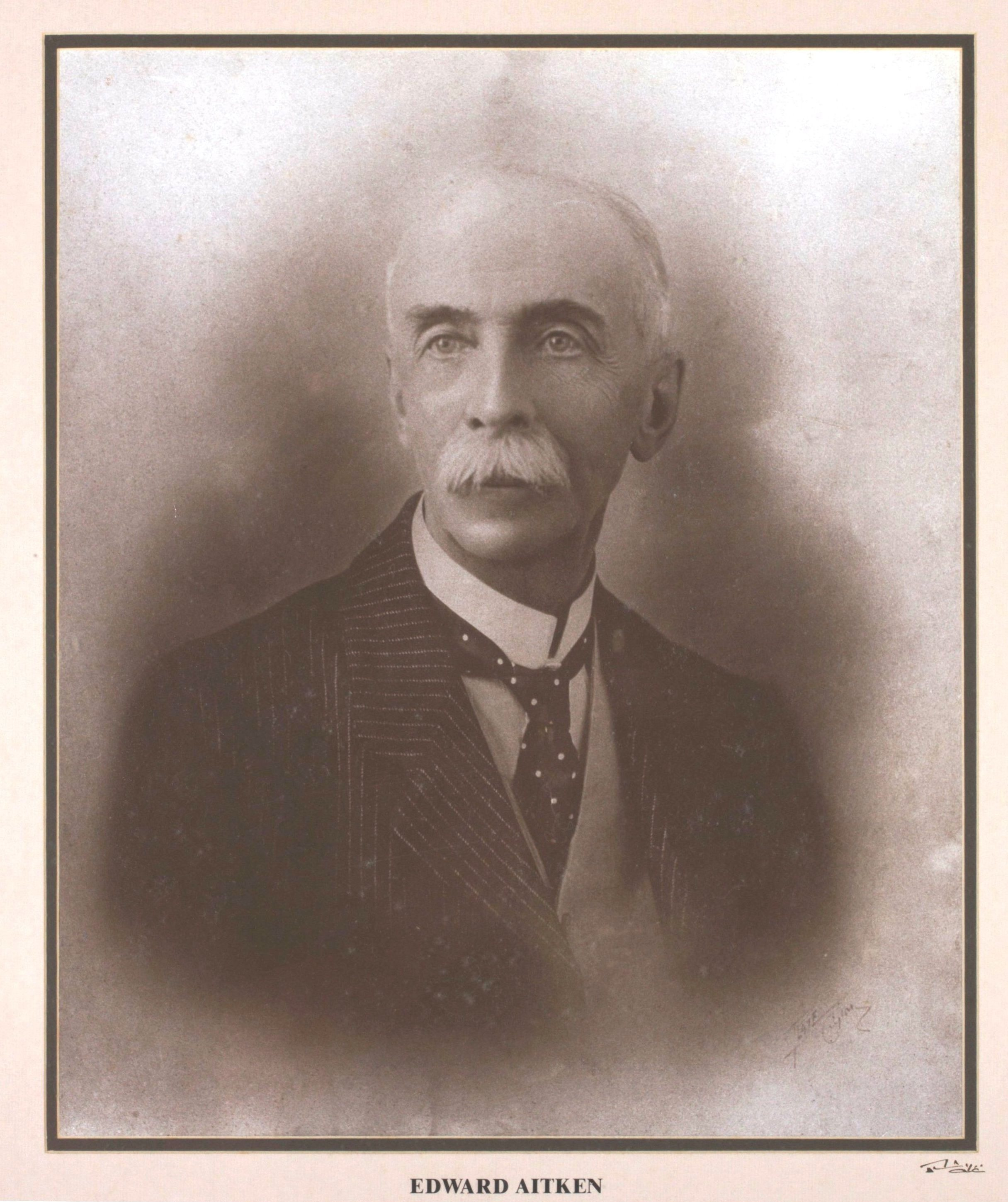
Edward Aitken

By the 1880s, Aitken Spence had also secured the shipping agencies Koninklijke Rotterdamsche Lloyd and Stoomvaart Maatschappij Nederland for Ceylon. The company moved into plantations sector as an agency house in the early 1900s and with the onset of the Great Depression, began to withdraw from its trading business. In 1918, Aitken Spence purchased the Freudenberg Building in Colombo, and made it its company headquarters having renamed the building the Lloyds Building. As a pioneer in port operations, Aitken Spence was entrusted in coordinating the Operations of Colombo Port during the Second World War.

Aitken Spence became a Private Company in 1952. In its centenary year, 1968, it appointed its first Sri Lankan Chairman, E.L. Van Langenberg. By 1971, as Sri Lanka was preparing to end British dominion and declare itself a republic, the company became a wholly Sri Lankan owned entity. In 1972, it began to offer shares to its executives, thereby broad basing its ownership. The company eventually moved on from this model and in 1983 offered its shares to the general public on the Colombo Stock Exchange with an issued share capital of Rs. 51 million.

During the early 1960s and early 1970s, Insurance and Plantations sectors—which were core business segments of Aitken Spence, where the company had been well established at the time—were nationalized. However, the Group's marine insurance segment (including its Lloyd's Agency) continued to operate as it did not fall within the purview of nationalization.

Despite the setbacks from nationalization, in realizing the then government's thrust to boost tourism, Aitken Spence launched its tourism segment in 1972 with investments in its first hotel (Neptune Hotel in Beruwala, Sri Lanka opened in 1974). The company then entered into Aviation in 1974 (as general sales agent for Singapore Airlines in Sri Lanka). In consolidating its travel agency business that had begun with the launch of Aitken Spence Hotels in 1974, Aitken Spence set up Aitken Spence Travels in 1977 as inbound and outbound tour operators in Sri Lanka and as agents for Eurail and Britrail. Tourism is now a core business segment of Aitken Spence.

With Sri Lanka adopting open market economic policies focused on export led growth in 1977, Aitken Spence forayed further into new business segments: container and allied services in 1979; garments and apparel in 1979; international courier services with TNT in 1981; and elevators in 1989 as agent of the Otis Elevator Company. With the insurance sector being deregulated in the 1980s, the Group played a pivotal role in the resurgence of private sector insurance as a proponent of the National Insurance Corporation and Union Assurance Ltd, stakes in which Aitken Spence subsequently divested. Aitken Spence reentered Plantations sector, when the sector was reprivatized in 1992, through its stake in Udapussellawa Plantation PLC that was later divested.

In response to the Power Crisis in Sri Lanka in 1996, Aitken Spence began to explore investment opportunities in power generation sector, with first two power plants coming online in 2002. The Group also maintained container vessel operations, with acquisition of five ships in a joint venture with Ceyline Group in 2003, which it later divested in 2008. In 2010, in continuing its partnership with Ceyline Group, Aitken Spence invested in CINEC, Sri Lanka's largest private higher education institution. In 2004, Aitken Spence Travels partnered with TUI Group of Germany to form a joint venture that is the largest leisure, travel and tourism company in the world.

Aitken Spence was the first Sri Lankan resort operator to embark on overseas resort operations having acquired Bathala Island Resort of Maldives in 1993. In 1996, Aitken Spence entered Bangladesh through Aitken Spence Cargo with its shipping services. A decade later, in 2006, Aitken Spence entered the Indian hospitality sector, having secured management contracts for five hotel properties in India. On the same year, the company broke new ground by becoming the first Sri Lankan company to venture into port efficiency management outside of Sri Lanka, when it undertook to improve efficiency of ports in the African continent. The company increased its global presence even further by obtaining the management of four hotel properties in Oman in 2007. In 2013, Aitken Spence announced its proposed venture into Fiji to manage the Ports of Suva and Lautoka in a public private partnership with the Government of Fiji. The Group has expressed interest to further diversify its investments in Fiji, venturing into hospitality, power and printing sectors. Currently, the company has operations in eight countries (Sri Lanka, Maldives, Bangladesh, India, South Africa, Oman, Fiji and Myanmar), spanning several continents with 13,000 employees.

== Governance structure ==
=== Chairman and Board of Directors ===
The current chairman/chairperson of Aitken Spence is Stasshani Jayawardena. She joined the board in December 2013 and was appointed Executive Chairman/Chairperson in February 2025 following the death of D. H. S. (Harry) Jayawardena, the previous chairman. She was among the youngest chairpersons of listed companies in Sri Lanka.

Parakrama Dissanayake, Deputy Chairman and Managing Director since 2019, was named Advisor to the President on Maritime, Ports and Logistics in January 2026 and resigned from the Group in February 2026. Stasshani Jayawardena began serving as interim Managing Director in April 2026.

=== Board of Directors ===
==== Executive ====
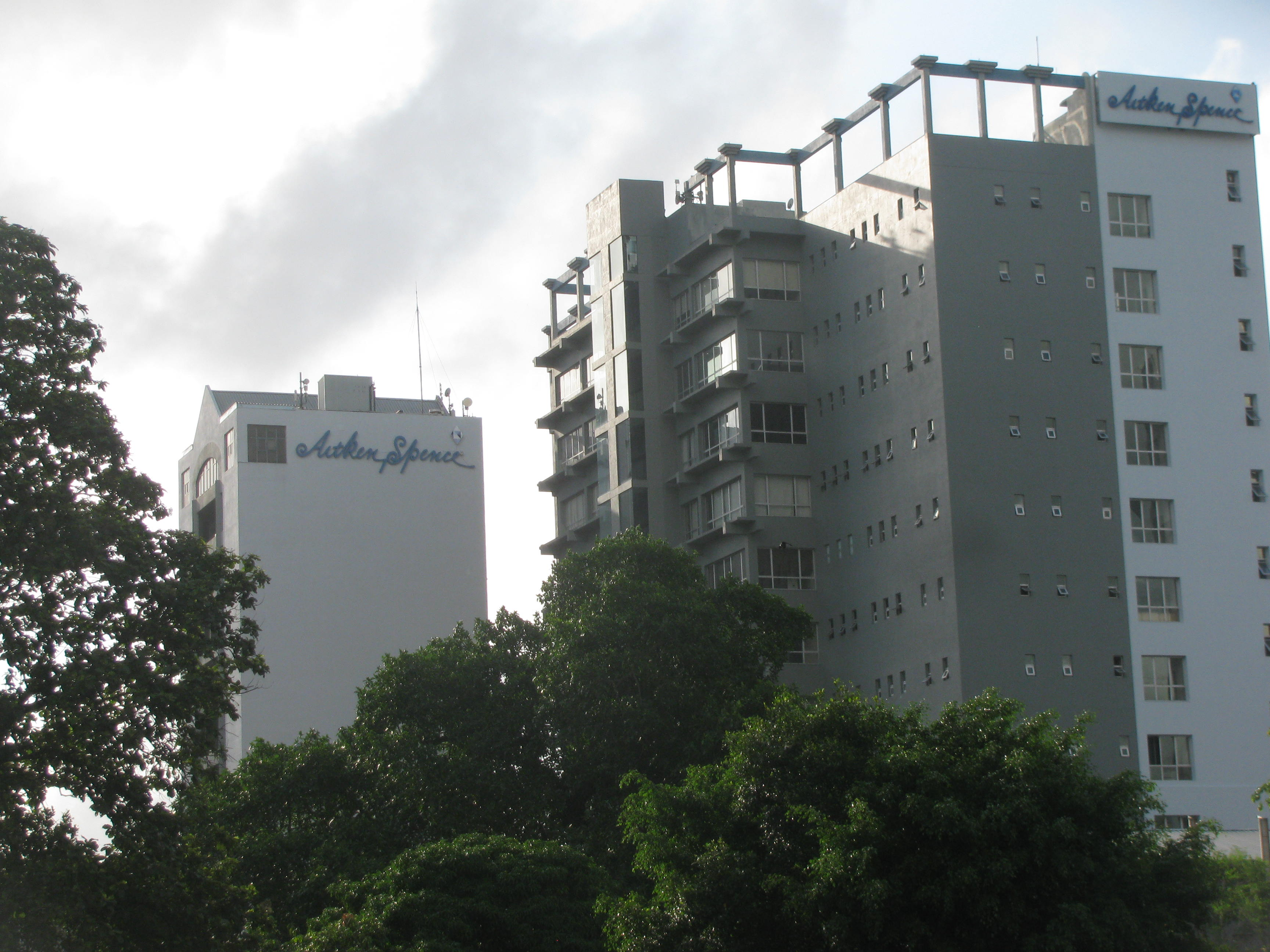
Aitken Spence Towers, Corporate Headquarters of Aitken Spence Group, in Colombo. 02.

- Ms. D. S. T. Jayawardena: Executive Chairman/Chairperson & Interim Managing Director (appointed December 2013)
- Dr. R. M. Fernando: Executive Director (April 2005)

==== Non-Independent Non-Executive ====
- Mr. J. M. S. Brito (April 2000)
- Hon. Chevalier Thakur Niranjan Joseph de S. Deva Aditya DL FRSA (September 2006)
- Mr. C. H. Gomez (April 2025)

==== Independent Non-Executive ====
- Mr. M. R. Mihular: Senior Independent Director (December 2024)
- Dr. R. A. Fernando (December 2024)
- Mr. P. Englisch (December 2024)
- Mr. C. J. Sevilla (December 2024)

=== Group Supervisory Board ===
- Ms. D. S. T. Jayawardena: Executive Chairman/Chairperson & Interim MD
- Dr. R. M. Fernando: Executive Director (Plantations, Corporate Strategy & Sustainability)
- Ms. N. Sivapragasam: Chief Financial Officer & MD (Corporate Services)
- Mr. C. M. S. Jayawickrama: MD, Aitken Spence Hotels Management
- Mr. N. A. N. Jayasundara: MD, Aitken Spence Travels
- Mr. I. S. Cuttilan: MD, Maritime Sector
- Mr. J. E. Brohier: MD, Agency Representation & Overseas Operations

=== Management Council ===
- Ms. D. S. T. Jayawardena: Executive Chairman/Chairperson & Interim MD
- Dr. R. M. Fernando: Executive Director
- Ms. N. Sivapragasam: CFO
- Mr. S. N. Muttiah: Group Chief Human Resources Officer
- Mr. C. M. S. Jayawickrama: MD, Aitken Spence Hotels Management
- Mr. N. A. N. Jayasundara: MD, Aitken Spence Travels
- Mr. I. S. Cuttilan: MD, Maritime Sector
- Mr. J. E. Brohier: MD, Agency Representation & Overseas Operations
- Mr. A. J. Gunewardena: CEO, Integrated Container Services
- Mr. V. P. Kudaliyanage: MD, GSA Singapore Airlines
- Mr. L. Wickremarachchi: MD, Power Segment Subsidiaries
- Mr. L. N. D. Silva: Director/CEO, Printing and Packaging
- Mr. A. G. Geethkumara: Director/CEO, Elpitiya Plantations PLC
- Mr. D. R. C. Hindurangala: MD, Elevators Segment & MMBL Money Transfer
- Ms. D. R. Alexander: Group Chief Supply Chain Officer & Chief Transformation Officer, Aitken Spence Hotels
- Ms. Y. M. Randeni: Group Chief Sustainability Officer & VP Corporate Strategy and Sustainability

=== Previous Leadership ===
The previous chairman, D. H. S. (Harry) Jayawardena, the previous chairman, was the founder director and current chairman/managing director of the Stassen Group of Companies – a diversified group in exports and import trade, the chairman of Lanka Milk Foods (CWE) PLC, Browns Beach Hotels PLC, Balangoda Plantations PLC, Madulsima Plantations PLC, Melstacorp PLC, Ambewela Livestock Company Ltd, Lanka Bell Ltd and also the chairman of the Distilleries Company of Sri Lanka (DCSL) PLC.

== Hotels ==
Aitken Spence Hotels owns and operates 22 hotels and resorts across Sri Lanka, Maldives, Oman and India. Currently it has the largest hotel sector portfolio in the country and a room inventory (owned and managed) of over 2,800 rooms of capacity. Its portfolio includes beach resorts and water villas, Ayurveda holiday resorts, and eco and culture resorts in the 3-5 star category.

Brands of Aitken Spence Hotels include 'Heritance', 'Adaaran', 'Turyaa' and 'Aitken Spence Hotels and Resorts'.

=== Sri Lanka ===
Aitken Spence is currently one of the largest resort operators in Sri Lanka. Also, is the largest international resort chain in the Maldives.

==== Heritance Hotels and Resorts ====
===== Heritance Ayurveda =====
Aitken Spence Group first ventured into hospitality sector in 1974, with the opening of Neptune Hotel—designed by Deshamanya Geoffrey Bawa—in Beruwala, Sri Lanka. In July 2011, the Group rebranded the hotel as Heritance Ayurveda Maha Gedara after a major renovation wherein the hotel was converted to an Ayurveda wellness resort.

===== Heritance Ahungalla =====
Heritance Ahungalla, formerly known as Triton, is Sri Lanka's first five-star beach resort—launched in 1981 in Ahungalla, a town in the southern coastal belt of Sri Lanka. Originally designed by Deshamanya Geoffrey Bawa, the 152-roomed 5-star resort was relaunched under the Heritance brand in June 2006 after a US$13 million refurbishment.

===== Heritance Kandalama =====
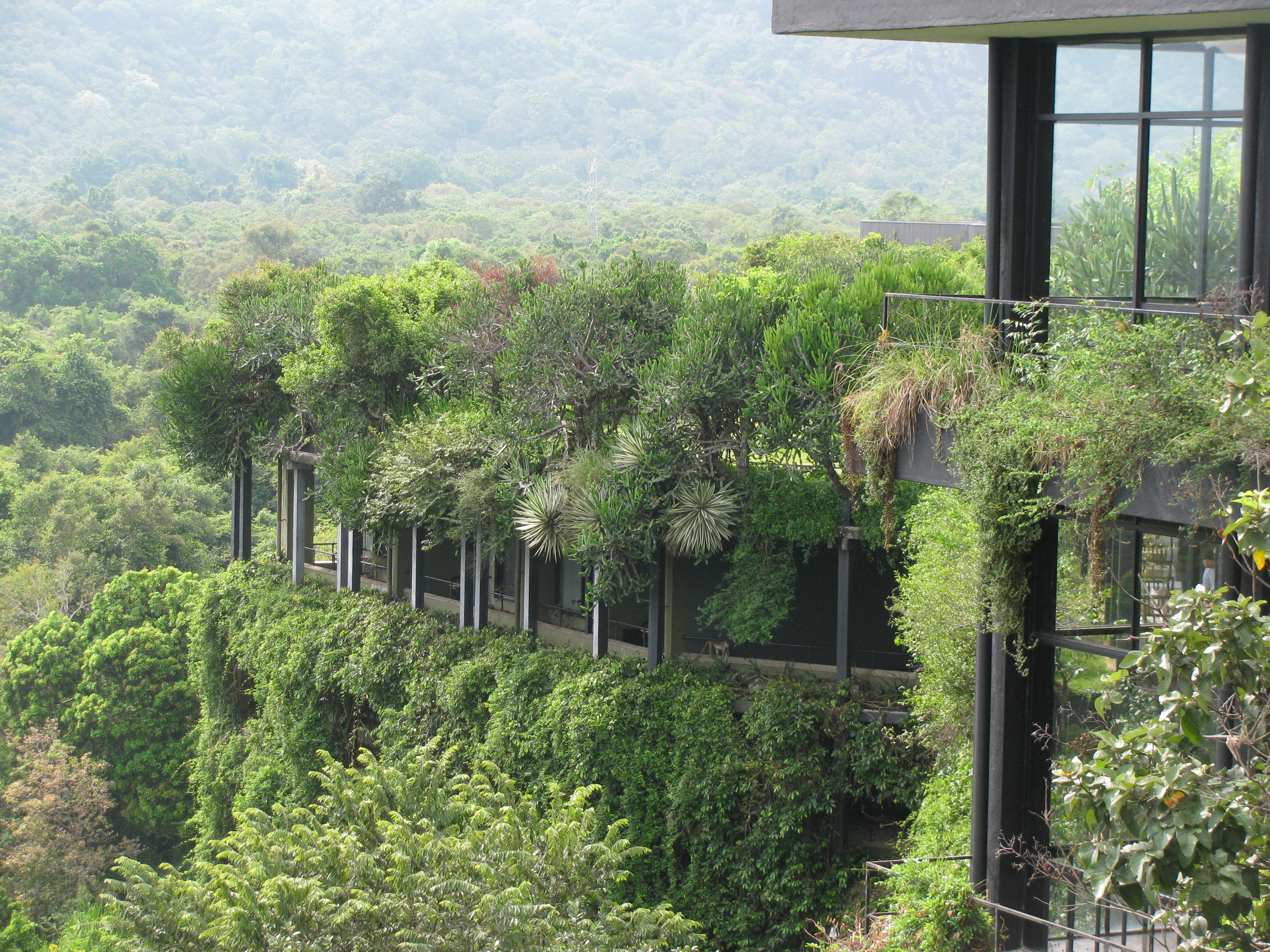
Exterior view of Heritance Kandalama

Heritance Kandalama, the flagship hotel of Aitken Spence, is located in Kandalama, Dambulla in proximity to two UNESCO World Heritage Sites— Sigiriya and Dambulla Cave Temple. The hotel is built into a natural rock outcrop within a jungle setting and overlooks the Kandalama Reservoir. Designed by Deshamanya Geoffrey Bawa,

==== Heritance Tea Factory ====
Heritance Tea Factory is a concept hotel wherein a 61-year-old dilapidated tea factory has been remodelled and conserved as a hotel. Located in Heathersett Estate (25 acre tea estate), Kandapola in the Nuwara Eliya district, the 5 star resort is considered to be the highest elevated (6,800 ft above sea level) luxury hotel in Sri Lanka. Conceptualized by G. C. Wickremasinghe, a former chairman and current board member of Aitken Spence, and designed by Nihal Bodhinayake, the hotel came to operation in 1996.

===== Heritance Negombo =====
Heritance Negombo (formally known as Browns Beach Hotel) was rebranded as Heritance Negombo.

==== Turyaa Kalutara ====
Turyaa Kalutara is a 200-room property in Waskaduwa, Kalutara, which was formerly known as "The Sands by Aitken Spence Hotels", "Ramada Kalutara" and "Golden Sun". The hotel which initially held 112 rooms was relaunched as Turyaa Kalutara after an addition of a new wing to the hotel in November 2015. Turyaa Kalutara is a beach-front resort with 200 rooms, equipped with private balconies.

==== Aitken Spence Hotels and Resorts ====
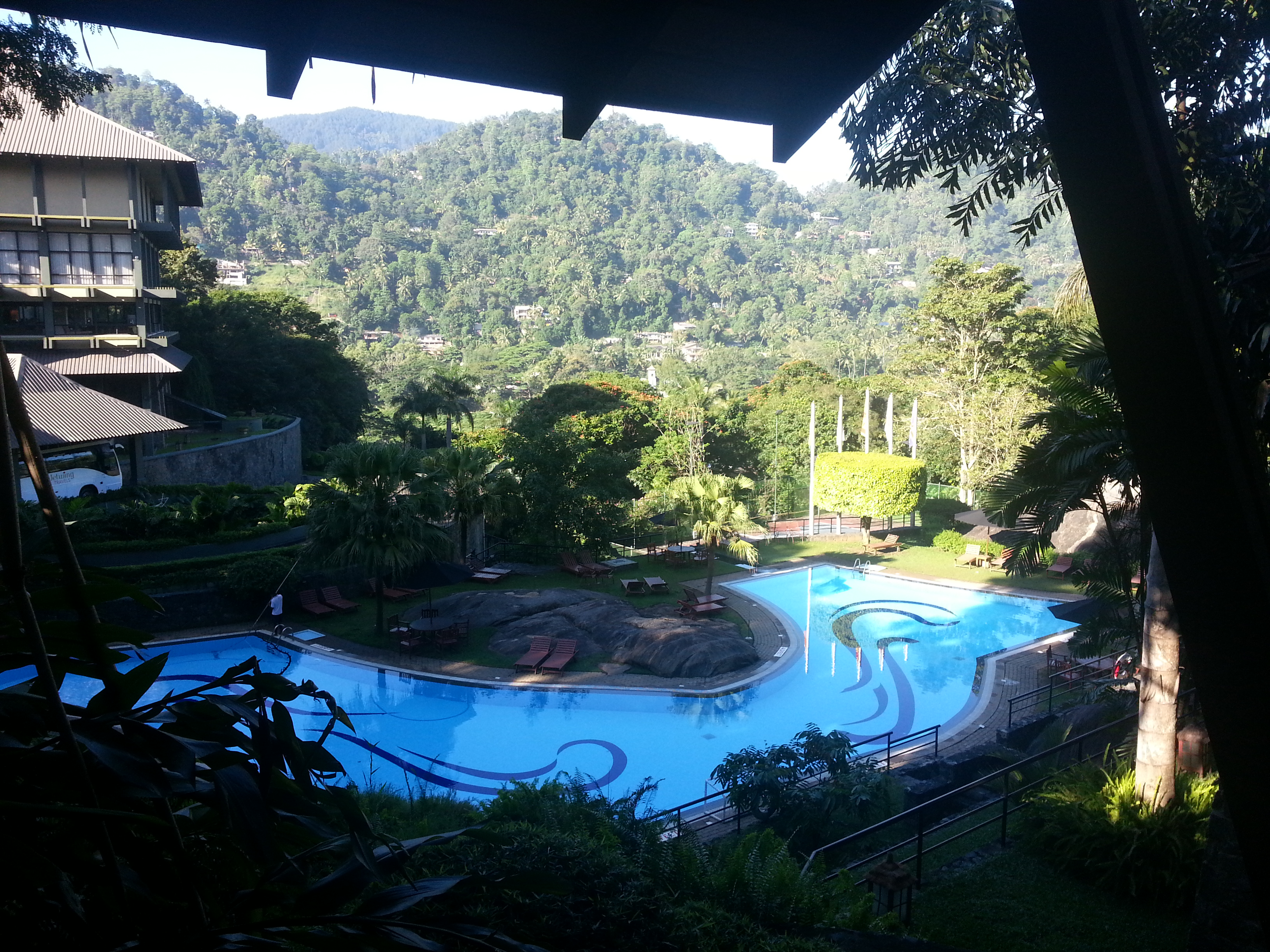
Earl's Regency-Kandy

Aitken Spence Hotels and Resorts currently operates the following hotels in Sri Lanka: Earl's Regency and Earl's Regent- Kandy. In 2012, total ownership of Hotel Hilltop Kandy was acquired; however, in 2017, the Group divested its ownership of Hotel Hilltop Kandy and took on the management of The Regent Kandy, a newly refurbished property with a four-star rating located in the centre of the city.

Aitken Spence has previously announced its interest to develop its properties in Ahungalla and Nilaveli as resort properties.

In November 2013, Aitken Spence announced its plans to enter into a joint venture with Spanish hotel chain RIU Hotels to build a 500-room, 5-star resort in Ahungalla to be opened in winter 2015. The business model for the new hotel involves attracting long haul travelers to Sri Lanka through charter flight holiday packages facilitated by TUI. Model is set on Mattala Rajapaksa International Airport & Sri Lanka's Southern Expressway providing the connectivity for tourists—disembarking from TUI's weekly 787 Dreamliner Charters—to reach the hotel. In May 2015, Aitken Spence Travels partnered with Alpitour Group and SriLankan Airlines to operate charters from Italy to attract 8000 tourists to this all-inclusive, 24-hour-service hotel on a Club Med model.

In 2016, Hotel RIU Sri Lanka came on board with its 501-room partnership venture with Spanish hotel developer and operator RIU Hotels. Although the majority stake is owned by Aitken Spence Hotel Holdings PLC, day-to-day management is done by RIU Hotels & Resorts.

In June 2014, Aitken Spence revealed plans to convert the Clan House, former headquarters of Clark Spence & Co. located within Galle Fort, to a 15-room heritage boutique hotel.

In September 2014, Aitken Spence acquired a strategic stake in Amethyst Resort, Passikudah with the management rights.

In 2014, Aitken Spence Hotels partnered with SriLankan Airlines's FlySmiLes loyalty program, which allows frequent flyers on Oneworld carriers the opportunity to gain/redeem miles for their stay at any of Aitken Spence's Sri Lankan hotels.

==== Aitken Spence School of Hospitality ====
Aitken Spence opened its School of Hospitality in November 2007 at Ahungalla, Sri Lanka with the assistance of the Austrian Chamber of Commerce and Hilfswerk to bridge the skills gap in the tourism sector. The school was initially set up to recover from the 2004 Indian Ocean Tsunami and assist locals in the Ahungalle region. However, since the ending of the Sri Lankan civil war, the school serves to assist the development in the North and the East as well as other rural areas in the country. The school has so far provided training opportunities for marginalized youth from Uva, North Central, East and Northern provinces in food and beverage services. In 2015, 27 trainees having completed a 3-month basic course in food and beverage, graduated from the Aitken Spence School of Hospitality in Ahungalla.

=== Maldives ===
Aitken Spence entered Maldivian hotel sector in 1993 with its investment in Bathala Island Resort. Aitken Spence is also the largest foreign resort operator in the Maldives and is among the five largest resort operators in the country.

==== Heritance Aarah ====
In March 2015, Aitken Spence acquired "Aarah", another island property in Maldives in Raa Atoll, to develop a 150-room, US$80 min resort, having received Maldivian Government's approval to expand buildable area in Maldivian archipelago.

Heritance Aarah from Aitken Spence Hotels will be the group's first 'Heritance' property overseas. Heritance Aarah is scheduled to open in time for the winter season of 2018.

==== Adaaran Hotels and Resorts ====
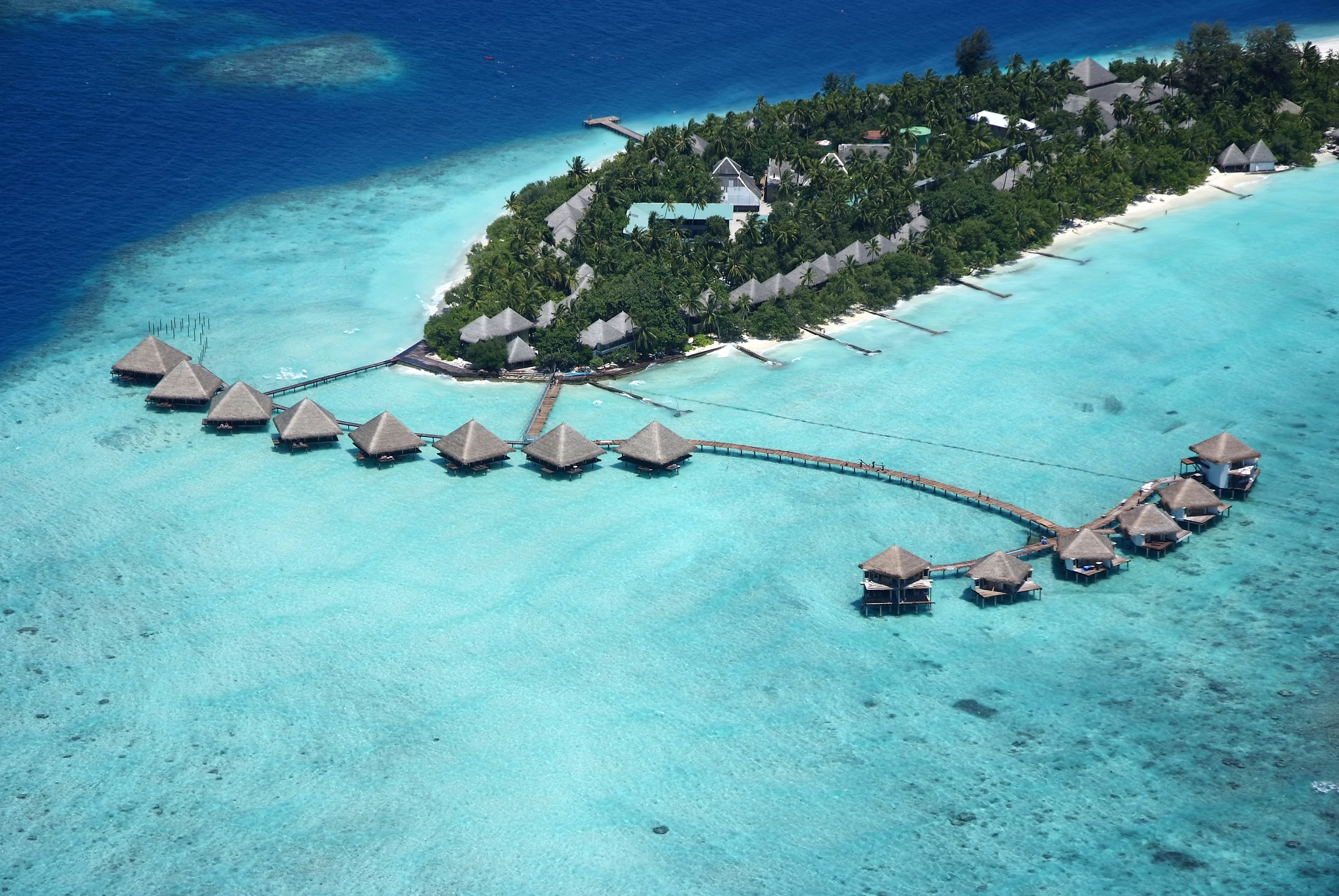
Adaaran Club Rannalhi

Branded as "Adaaran", the company currently operates 5 hotels in properties located on the islands of Vadoo, Meedhupparu, Rannalhi and Hudhuranfushi.

===== Adaaran Club Rannalhi =====
Adaaran Club Rannalhi is a 4 star resort located in Rannalhi, a southern island in the Malé Atoll, with 30 water villas (one of the first resorts to adopt over-water accommodation in Maldives) and 100 beach villas with a room capacity of 132 rooms.

===== Adaaran Prestige Vadoo =====
Adaaran Prestige Vadoo resort, acquired by Aitken Spence in October 2007 is the latest addition to the Group's resorts in Maldives. Located in close proximity to Malé, it houses 50 luxury water villas including six Japanese styled water bungalows.

===== Adaaran Select Hudhuran Fushi =====
Adaaran Select Hudhuran Fushi is a 4 star resort comprising 137 villas that includes 37 luxury villas.

===== Adaraan Select Meedhupparu =====
Situated on Meedhupparu Island in Raa Atoll, Adaaran Select Meedhupparu is a 4 star resort with 215 beach and garden villas.

===== Adaraan Prestige Water Villas =====
Adaaran Prestige Water Villas, also located in the Meedhupparu Island, consists of 20 luxury water villas.

===== Raafushi Island =====
In May 2015, Aitken Spence obtained the lease for the Raafushi Island in the Noonu Atoll to build a four star resort.

=== India ===
==== Turyaa Chennai ====
In June 2014, Aitken Spence announced the purchase of a brand new five star hotel in Chennai. The company plans to commence operations of this hotel in July 2015 under the brand Turyaa Chennai.

The 140-room property, Turyaa Chennai opened its doors on 1 October 2015.

=== Oman ===
In Oman, Aitken Spence currently owns one hotel and manages four hotels:

==== Al Falaj Hotel Muscat ====
Al Falaj Hotel is a 140 roomed 4 star resort located in the city of Muscat. Aitken Spence bought the hotel from Oman Hotels and Tourism Company for whom the company had been managing the property since 2008.

==== Al Wadi Hotel, Sohar ====
Al Wadi Hotel is a 79-room 3 star resort in Sohar.

==== Desert Nights Camp, Al Wasil ====
Desert Nights Camp is a 5-star tented resort property with 30 Bedouin style tents located in Al Wasil, a township close to Muscat.

==== Sur Plaza Hotel, Sur ====
Sur Plaza Hotel is a 4 star 95-room resort located in Sur in proximity to Green Turtle Beach at Ras-al-Hadd.

== Transport ==
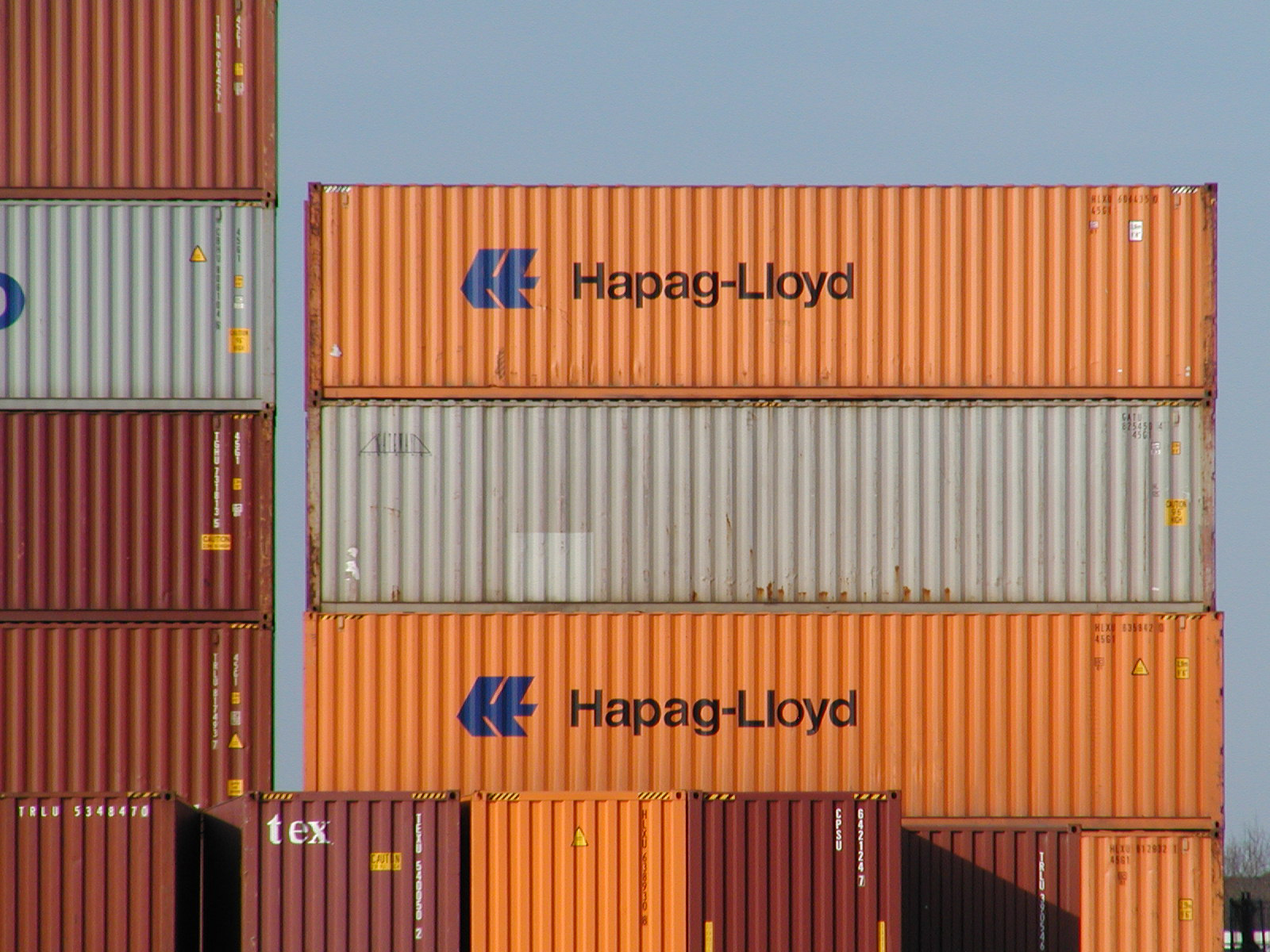
Aitken Spence Logistics offers container shipping

Aitken Spence offers integrated transportation services in air-sea freight forwarding, warehousing, distribution, couriers, ground transport and marine. Its services cover the complete physical cargo flow process from shipper to recipient. It also handles third and fourth party logistics management contracts. The company also represents DB Schenker in Sri Lanka and Maldives. Also, represents DPD Group and DTDC Express in Sri Lanka and Maldives. The segment represents the cargo GSA for Qatar Airways in Sri Lanka and the cargo GSA for SriLankan Airlines in Maldives and Myanmar, and are the managing agents for cargo GSA for SriLankan Airlines in Bangladesh.

=== Cargo consolidation and storage facilities ===
In terms of cargo consolidation, the company offers both local and multi country cargo consolidation. In Sri Lanka, it operates its own container freight station with in-house customs that complies with C-TPAT standards. Aitken Spence Cargo and Courier services provide air freight, ocean freight, supply chain management, brokerage, project cargo management and international and domestic courier as primary services and also specialize in airline cargo GSA representation Aitken Spence Logistics. Aitken Spence Logistics also services shipments of garments through its garments on hanger facilities and quality assurance centre facilities. The company also offers refrigerated storage services in terms of cold rooms and reefer containers to its clients.

With respect to warehousing facilities in Sri Lanka, Aitken Spence operates a central cargo storage complexes with a total floor area exceeding 300,000 sqft, located in Colombo, Wattala, Mabole and Katunayake Zone with a modern fleet of equipment and cargo handling machinery.

=== Container handling, repair and modification facilities ===
The container services arm of Aitken Spence Logistics that processes a container every two minutes is the first company in Sri Lanka to operate its own container depot (first at Mattakkuliya in 1979 and shifted to Mabole in 1989). In addition, Aitken Spence also runs a Lloyd's approved facility for container modification and repair services.

The company provides import and export container handling services, handling transshipment cargo, and the servicing of passenger cruise vessels, car carriers and casual callers.

=== Ground transport and project cargo handling ===
Aitken Spence also offers transportation through its transport fleet of prime movers with 20'/40' trailers, lorries and tank trucks. The Group is also capable in handling Heavy Over-Dimensional Project cargo. It is also the agent for Flexi Tank Services in Sri Lanka for Trans Ocean Distribution.

=== Freight forwarding, courier services and air cargo ===
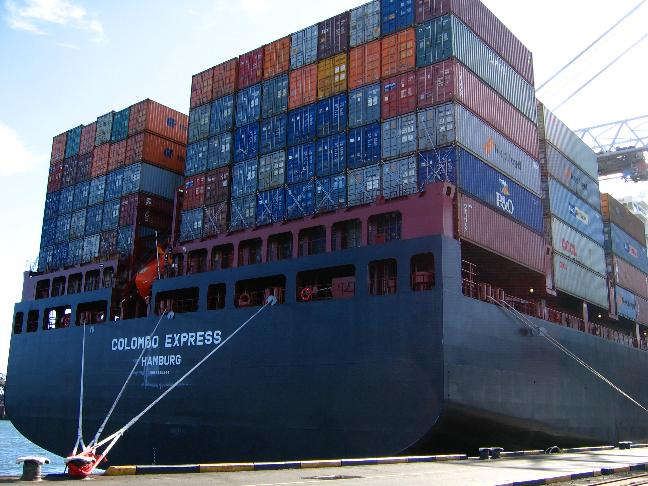
Hapag Lloyd is represented in Sri Lanka through Aitken Spence Maritime

In addition to its own haulage, Aitken Spence also provides freight forwarding through its global partner network. Aitken Spence Cargo, specialized freight-forwarding arm of Aitken Spence, provides air freight, sea freight, brokerage, customs facilitation and supply chain solutions to clients in Sri Lanka, Bangladesh and Maldives.

Aitken Spence handles cargo sales agencies for Singapore Airlines Cargo, Air Jamaica, My Travels, Qatar Airways Cargo and EVA Air in Sri Lanka. It is also the General Sales Agents (Cargo) for My Travels in Maldives & Bangladesh; Livingston Air in Bangladesh, Singapore and Thailand; Continental Airlines Cargo in Bangladesh, while being the cargo sales agents for SriLankan Airlines Cargo in the Maldives.

Aitken Spence Group represents TNT Express courier services in Sri Lanka and provides both domestic and international courier services. It also represents Spring Global Mail in Sri Lanka.

=== Maritime services ===
Aitken Spence offers services in the maritime sector through its maritime wing, Aitken Spence Maritime. Its services include liner agency representation (of G6 Alliance), cruise vessel representation, feeder and casual caller representation, break bulk facilities, and ship servicing and facilitation (crew services, bunkering, repairs, supply of provisions) for ports in Sri Lanka. It also provides ship chartering services.

In January 2005, in a joint venture with Ceyline Holdings, Aitken Spence re-entered the ship owning for time charter business in order to profit from the then shipping boom. In 2007, with the saturation of the ship chartering market, Aitken Spence exited the ship owning business and shifted its strategic focus to expanding its port management business.

In 2007, Aitken Spence in partnership with Port of Singapore Authority submitted a joint bid to build and operate the South Container Terminal of the Colombo Port Expansion Project. When the initial bidding process of Sri Lanka Port Authority (SLPA) stalled and was reactivated, Aitken Spence partnered with China Merchant Holdings International and was the sole bidder in support of the project. In 2010, the bid was approved by SLPA and construction began on the US$450 million project. However, in 2012, citing cost escalations and changes in financing requirements, Aitken Spence sold its stake to CMHI in 2012, realizing a LKR Rs. 630 million capital gain.

Aitken Spence is the first Sri Lankan company to venture into port efficiency improvement, training and container terminal management overseas with its operations in the African continent. As a result of the strategic partnership with the Port of Durban from 2006, Aitken Spence won a "ship planning and mentoring" project covering the Ports of Durban, Cape Town and Ngqura in South Africa in 2010. In 2011, Aitken Spence announced that it has won a deal to improve the efficiency of Port of Nacala in Mozambique. In 2013, Aitken Spence took over the management of two Fijian ports, Suva and Lautoka, with its purchase of 51% of Fiji Ports Terminal Ltd, a 100% owned subsidiary of Fiji Ports Corporation Ltd. The company further consolidated its presence in the Fijian maritime sector in acquiring a 20% stake in Fiji Ports Corporation Ltd. in November 2015.

In 2010, Aitken Spence renewed its alliance with Ceyline Group of Companies when it invested in Colombo International Nautical and Engineering College (CINEC). In 2012, Aitken Spence increased its stake in CINEC from 10% to 40% in a move to further strengthen its maritime portfolio. Located in Malabe, the CINEC Campus is Sri Lanka's largest private higher education institution and also has branches in Colombo, Trincomalee and Jaffna. CINEC also manages the maritime academies in Fiji and Seychelles. In 2013, further to Aitken Spence's entry into port management in Fiji, Fijian Government announced plans to invite CINEC to manage Fiji National University's maritime school.

== Services ==
In the services sector, Aitken Spence operates in a number of key domains: inbound tourism, outbound travel, airline agencies, conventions and exhibitions, elevator agency, financial services, insurance, business and knowledge process outsourcing and luxury lifestyle solutions.

=== Destination management ===
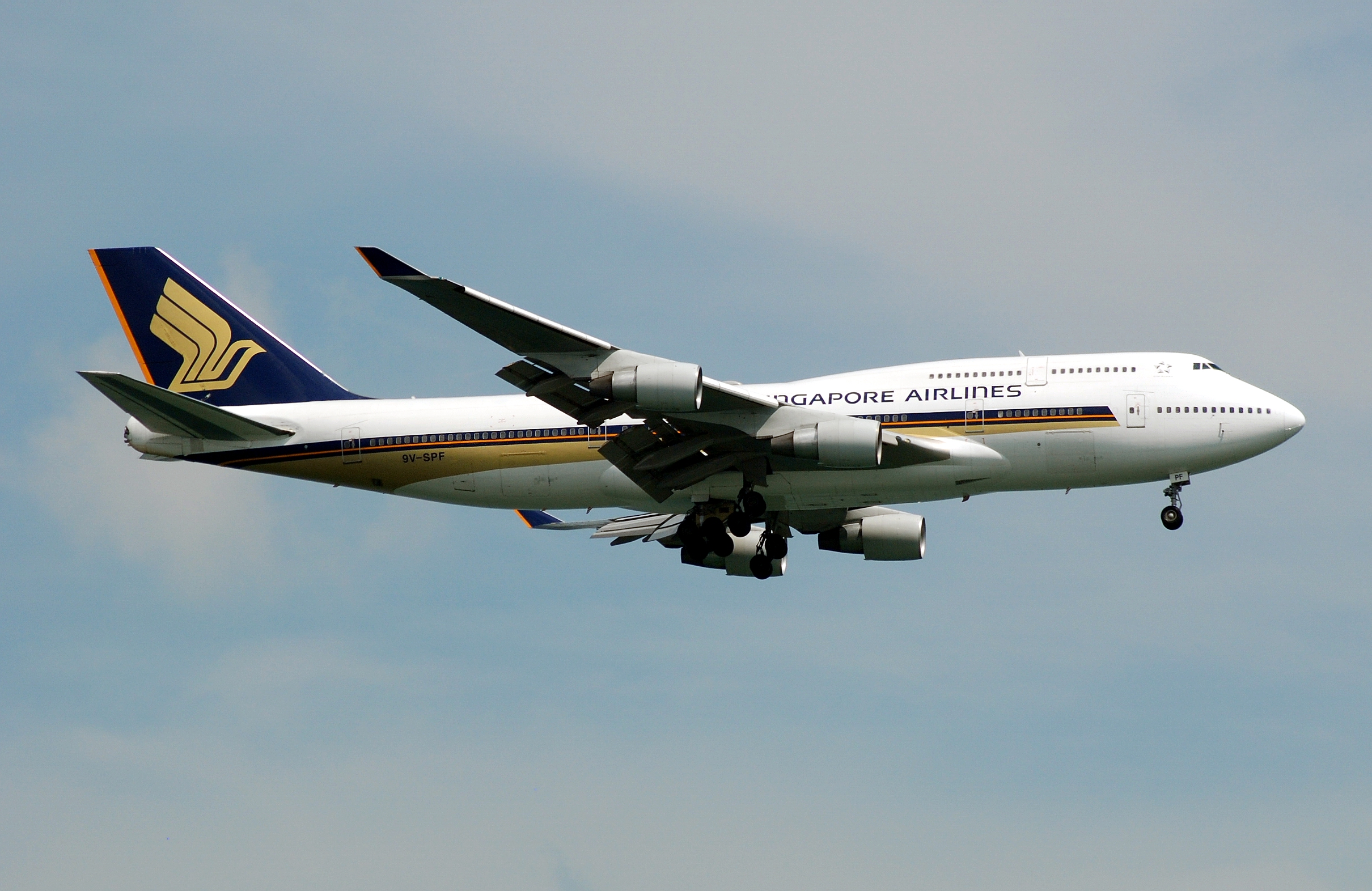
Aitken Spence has represented Singapore Airlines in Sri Lanka since 1972

With regards to inbound tourism sector, Aitken Spence Travels – a joint venture with TUI—is the largest destination management company in Sri Lanka representing over 200 international tour operators, and has been recognized with Sri Lanka's Presidential Award for the Best Destination Management Company and leading Destination Management Company at the World Travel Awards in 2017. The outbound travel arm of Aitken Spence Travels is an IATA approved outbound travel agency and has been in operation since 1975, making it one of the oldest IATA agencies in Sri Lanka. In addition to its core business of airline ticketing, it is also the general sales agent for Rail Europe, Inc. and Tradewinds. Aitken Spence Travels is also the representative in Sri Lanka for CWT, a global travel management company. Aitken Spence is also the preferred partner of Emirates Holidays in Sri Lanka. In financial year 2017/2018, Aitken Spence Travels handled over 178,000 tourists to Sri Lanka.

=== Event management and MICE ===
Aitken Spence Conventions & Exhibitions is the event management arm of the Aitken Spence PLC and is specialized in organizing Meetings, Incentives, Conferences & Exhibitions in Sri Lanka and the Maldives.Aitken Spence Conventions & Exhibitions The company also represents Pacific World MICE company in Sri Lanka and the Maldives.

=== Airline agency ===
In terms of airline agency services, Aitken Spence acts as the General Sales Agent for Singapore International Airlines in Sri Lanka and the Maldives. Aitken Spence is also the General Sales Agent for SriLankan Airlines in Maldives.

=== Financial services ===
In the financial services sector, Aitken Spence in a joint venture with Mercantile Merchant Bank, Sri Lanka offers Western Union Money Transfer services in Sri Lanka with a network of over 2000 sub-agent locations countrywide, which includes banks, financial institutions and retail outlets. As an authorized agent for Western Union in Sri Lanka, the Group's money transfer services business has a commanding 65% share of the Western Union business in Sri Lanka.

Aitken Spence serves as survey and claim settling agents for Lloyd's of London since 1876, covering the commercial ports in Sri Lanka and the Republic of Maldives. It also carries out quality surveys and hull and machinery surveys. In addition, Aitken Spence Insurance also acts as survey and claims settling agents for several other reputed insurance companies worldwide including AVIVA, People's Insurance Company of China, Oriental Insurance Co. of India, New India Assurance, Iffco-Tokio of India, Royal & Sun Alliance Group, Northern Marine Underwriters, China Pacific Property Insurance Co. Ltd, Sumitomo Fire & Marine Insurance Co. Ltd., Tokyo Marine & Fire Insurance Co. of Japan, Cesam of France, QBE Insurance of Singapore and American Home Assurance Company since 1949.

=== Knowledge and information technology ===
The Group also provides human resources consulting in Sri Lanka and overseas under brand "Genuity".

Aitken Spence Technologies offers IT in, enterprise content management (ECM), enterprise resource planning (ERP), both based on core-Oracle Applications and Technologies, and Application Development based on Open Source/Java technologies. In 2012, Aitken Spence was appointed as Oracle University Education Re-seller Partner and Approved Training Centre. Aitken Spence Technologies is also a member of IBM PartnerWorld program. In October 2013, PlantERM, the Enterprise Resource Management application developed for the first time in Sri Lanka for the plantation sector by Aitken Spence Technologies, received the NBQSA Gold Award in the General Applications category.

Aitken Spence offers financial accounting outsourcing services through its subsidiary Aitken Spence Business Solutions in Sri Lanka, Maldives and Bangladesh. The business solutions partners include; Citibank, HSBC, Deutsche Bank and Standard Chartered Bank on the electronic banking and Oracle in the ERP solutions.Aitken Spence Business Solutions

=== Elevator agency ===
Aitken Spence also provides elevator services acting as the agent for Otis Elevators (part of United Technologies Corporation) in Sri Lanka and the Maldives since 1989.

== Strategic investments ==
=== Power generation ===
Aitken Spence first entered the power sector in 1996 in a joint venture with a Japanese investor to build two thermal power plants in Sri Lanka with the Government of Sri Lanka inviting private sector to invest in resolving the then power crisis. However, due to the longevity of the process in obtaining clearances, the Japanese partner backed out and in 1999, Aitken Spence (51%) partnered with Commonwealth Development Corporation Globeleq (29%), Baneras House of India (10%) and Wärtsilä (10%) to construct the Ace Matara Power Station (24.4MW) and Ace Horana Power Station (24.4MW). Subsequently, following a Request for Proposal by Ceylon Electricity Board (CEB) in February 2002, Aitken Spence together with Caterpillar Power Ventures Corporation began the construction of the Embilipitiya Power Station (100MW), which came online in April 2005.

Ace Power Embilipitiya thermal power plant operates on a 100MW while the Branford Hydro power plant operates at 2.5MW, Ace Wind power plant at 3MW and Western Power at 10MW capacity. The Power Purchase Agreement (PPA) between the Ceylon Electricity Board and Ace Power Embilipitiya lapsed in 2015; however, renewed the agreement for a one more year in April 2016, when the country ran into power crisis after two back-to-back blackouts in late 2015 and early 2016. During the first quarter of 2018, the government decided to extend the purchasing of thermal power for three more years as the country had four seasons of back-to-back dry spells, which exhausted reservoirs and the crucial catchment areas.

==== Hydro, Wind, Solar, Waste-to-Energy and Dendro Power ====
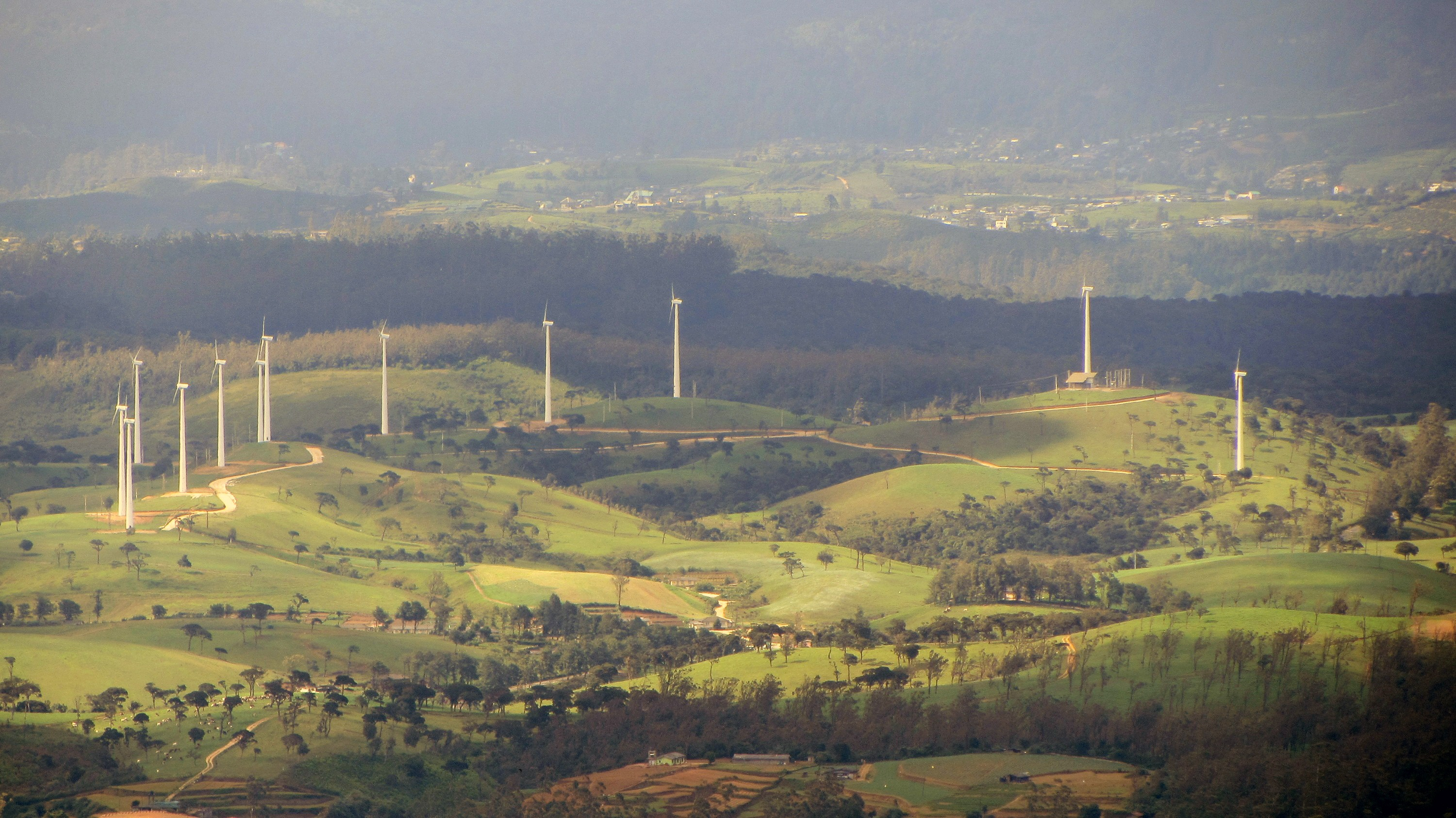
Ace Wind Power, Ambewela

Aitken Spence has also sought to diversify its power portfolio with an increased presence in the clean and renewable energy domain in Sri Lanka.

Aitken Spence Power has already completed construction of the 2.5 MW Branford Hydro Power Plant in Matale, and of Ace Wind Power power plant in Ambewela that has an installed capacity of 3 MW. Both power plants were connected to the national grid during 2012/13 financial year. Aitken Spence Power is also currently building the Aitken Spence Power Station, Waste-To-Energy Coprocessing Plant at Muthurajawela.

Ace Power embarked on a landmark project in the country's waste to energy sphere. Seen as a vital and much needed solution for the waste disposal crisis within Colombo city limits, the proposed project involves the construction of a 10MW waste-toenergy plant at Muthurajawela. The plant will be fuelled by waste collected from the Colombo Municipal Area, which was previously dumped in Meethotamulla. The plant is equipped to convert between 600 – 800 metric tonnes of municipal solid waste daily to electricity. Estimated to cost Rs. 13 billion on completion, the project is funded through a combination of equity and term loan funding. The construction work on the project commenced following the ground-breaking ceremony held in August 2017 with the participation of the president. This new waste to energy project is due to commence commercial operations in 2019.

Aitken Spence Hotels (through biomass plants and solar generation) and Plantations (through mini hydro projects) have also undertaken mini power projects of their own. Heritance Ayurveda Maha Gedara is the first hotel in Sri Lanka to enter into a net metering agreement with CEB.

=== Plantation services ===
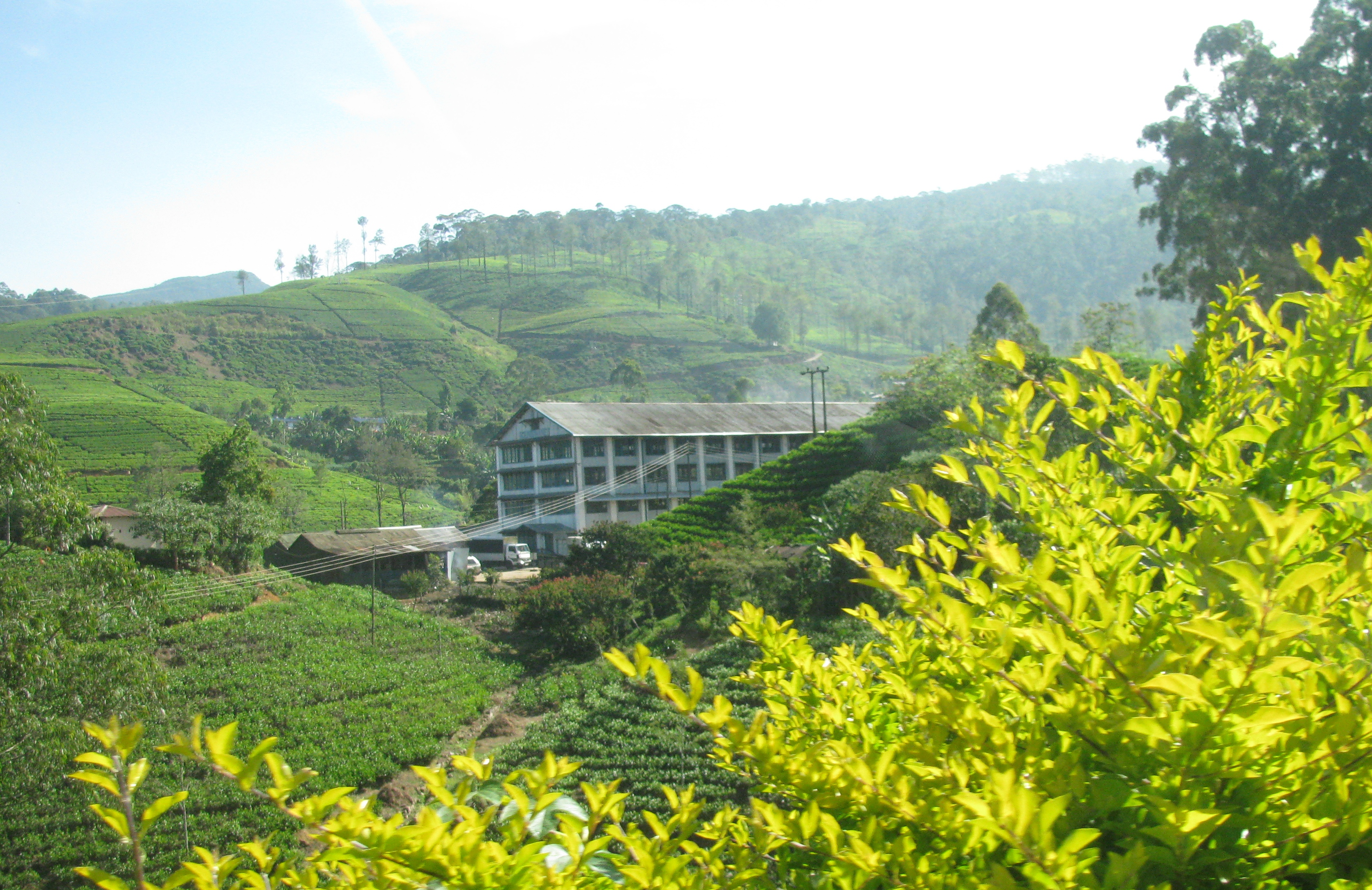
Dunsinane Estate, Nuwara Eliya

Aitken Spence has been in the plantations industry from the early 1900s. In 1975, the estates originally owned by Aitken Spence were acquired under the plantation nationalization program. In 1992, with the re-privatization of plantations industry, Aitken Spence reentered the sector in taking over the management of Udapussellawa Plantation PLC. It also invested in a minority stake in Talawakelle Plantations. Aitken Spence later divested its stake in Udapussellawa and Talawakelle Plantations

The management of Elpitiya Plantations PLC was taken over by Aitken Spence in 1997 from Carsons through Aitken Spence Plantations Managements Ltd. The Group currently manages 13 estates (with over 8800 hectares of cultivated land) in Sri Lanka, producing high, mid and low grown teas. From the 13 estates, six estates are located on the up cluster in Kandy and Nuwara Eliya districts (estates: Dunsinane, Sheen, Fernlands, Meddecombra, New Peacock and Nayapane) and seven estates in the low cluster (Deviturai, Talgaswella, Gulugahakanda, Lelwala, Ketandola, Bentota and Elpitiya). These estates conform with multiple standards on sustainability including ISO 22000 for food safety management system, Rainforest Alliance certification, Ethical Tea Partnership and Forest Stewardship Council certification. In addition to tea, Elpitiya Plantations also produces rubber, coconut, cinnamon and palm oil.

Group has diversified its plantation operations into other areas such as palm oil processing, hydropower development, speciality tea manufacturing and eco-tourism.

The Group also has its own tea brand for black tea and green tea in Sri Lanka under the name "Harrow Ceylon Choice".

In January 2013, Elpitiya Plantations PLC entered a joint venture with Dianhong International Limited, Hong Kong, a subsidiary of Yunnan Dianhong Group Company Limited of China, to grow and process tea in Sri Lanka for Chinese Speciality Tea market.

In April 2013, shares of Aitken Spence Plantation Managements Ltd was introduced to the Colombo Stock Exchange.

=== Garment manufacturing ===
Aitken Spence entered the garments manufacturing sector in 1979 with its factory at Mattakkuliya. Currently, Aitken Spence operates two factories in Sri Lanka—in Matugama (opened in 1993 in support of the 200 garment factories initiative of the then Government of Sri Lanka) and at Koggala Export Processing Zone (since 2008)—that manufactures and exports clothing for clients such as The Gap, Inc., Columbia Sportswear, Kohl's and Sears in the US, and Marks & Spencer Work Wear, Sainsbury's, Tesco, Waitrose, Boots and Marriot in Europe.

=== Printing ===
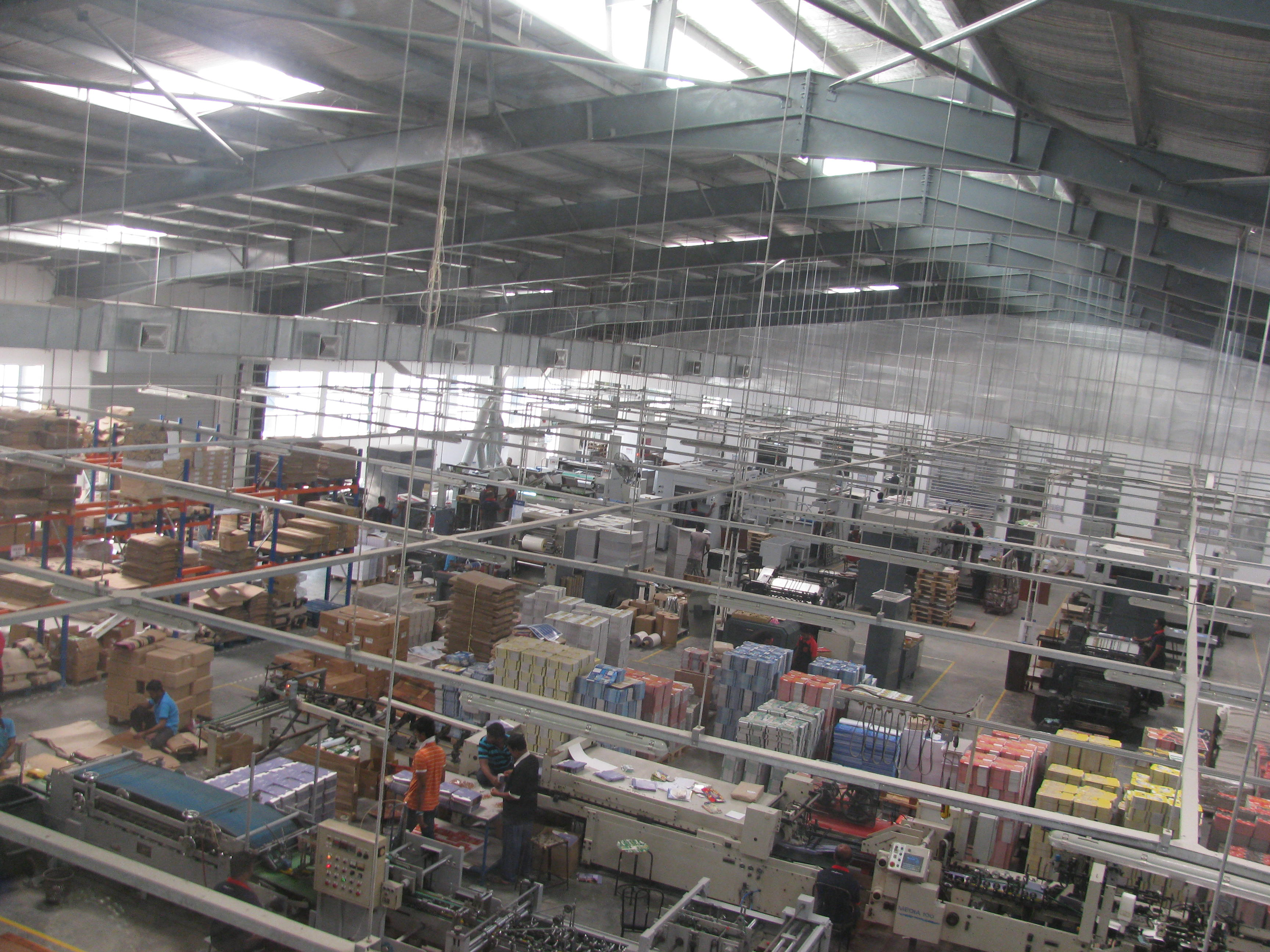
Aitken Spence Green Printing Facility

In 1955, Clark Spence & Co. opened its own press to service its internal printing needs in Galle. Printing services were gradually opened for external parties and with the higher demand, the service offering was expanded with a full-fledged printing plant. Subsequently, in 1962, printing plant was moved from Galle to Colombo (Vauxhall St. Colombo 02 premises, where current Aitken Spence Group Headquarters is located) and ownership transferred to Aitken Spence & Co.

In 1977, whole printing department was burnt from a fire and its operations were halted. In 1982, a new printing plant was built at Bloemendhal Road, Colombo 13 to resume printing services. In 2010, due to capacity constraints, the company made a decision to relocate this printing plant yet again.

The production of printed packaging materials represents about 80 percent of business for the printing segment. In regards to packaging materials, it currently caters to major brands in garment industry, FMCG, cosmetics and pharmaceuticals in Sri Lanka. The company also caters to international clients such as Marks & Spencer, British Home Stores, Tesco and DBA Europe.

=== Next Generation Technology Products ===
In October 2014, Aitken Spence invested in Eco Corp Asia, a company holding the exclusive rights in Sri Lanka to market nanotechnology based liquid glass coating product of Nanopool GmbH. The operation formulates specialized surface protection systems and applications on different materials utilizing nanotechnology; while introducing diverse innovative solutions for industries.
