= Heritance Tea Factory =

Building in Kandapola, Sri Lanka

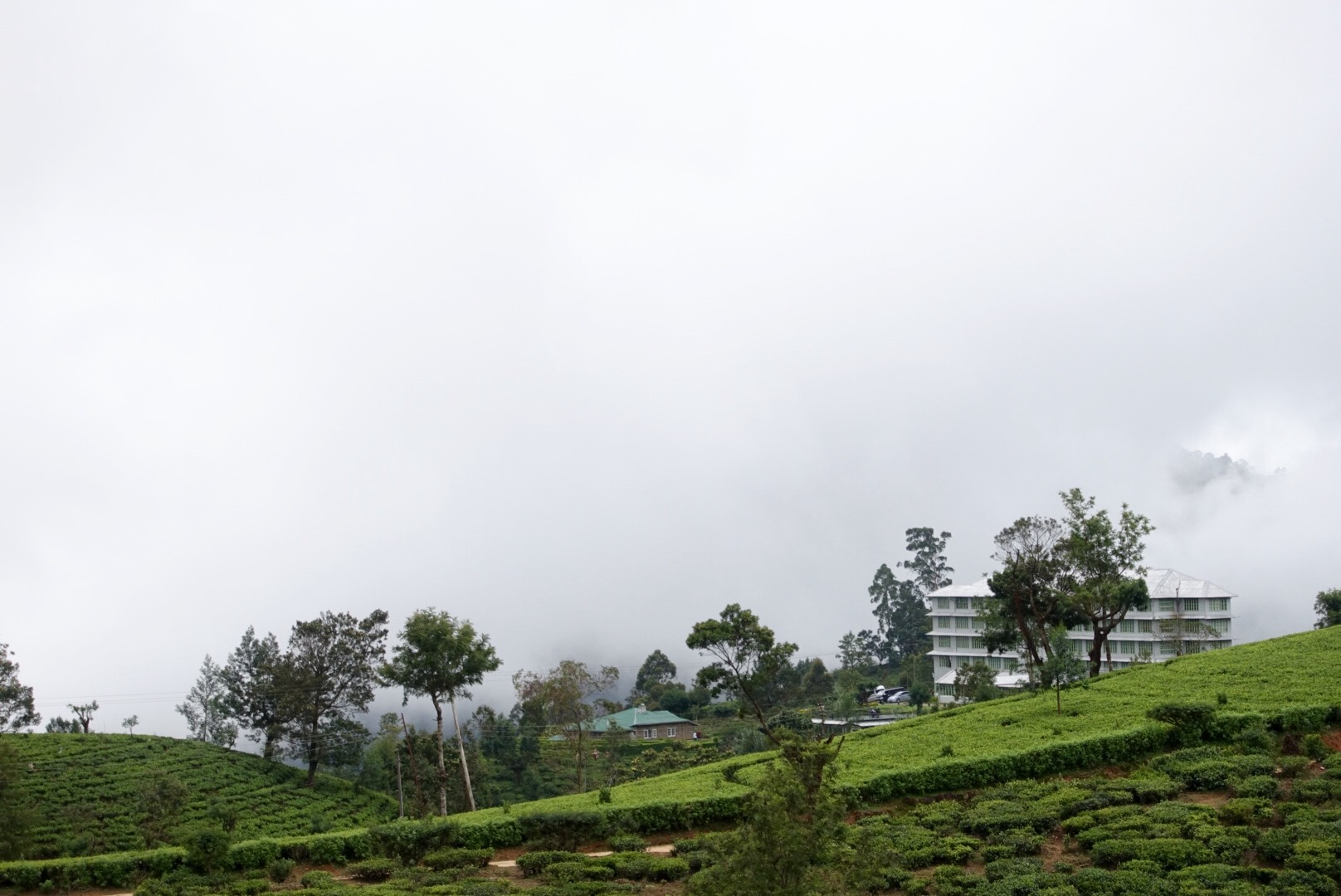
- Heritance Tea Factory is a former tea factory converted into a hotel
- Interactive map of the Heritance Tea Factory area
- Hotel chain: Heritance Hotels and Resorts

General information
- Architectural style: Colonial architecture
- Location: Kandapola, Sri Lanka
- Coordinates: 6°59′28.5″N 80°50′01.5″E
- Opened: 1996
- Owner: Hethersett Hotels Ltd (a subsidiary of Aitken Spence Hotel Holdings)

Design and construction
- Architect: Nihal Bodhinayake

Other information
- Number of rooms: 48
- Number of suites: 2
- Number of restaurants: 2
- Number of bars: 2

Website
- www.heritancehotels.com/teafactory/

Heritance Tea Factory, formerly known as The Tea Factory Hotel, is a luxury four-star hotel in Kandapola, Sri Lanka. The hotel is situated in Nuwara Eliya District, 14 kilometres (8.7 miles) from Nuwara Eliya, the district capital. Hethersett Hotels Ltd, a subsidiary of Aitken Spence Hotel Holdings, is the proprietor of the hotel. The hotel is part of Aitken Spence's Heritance Hotels and Resorts chain brand. The hotel is the brainchild of G. C. Wickremasinghe, a director of Aitken Spence. After seeing the neglected tea factory of the Hethersett Tea Estate on a visit in 1992, Wickremasinghe had the idea of converting the facility into a hotel. Nihal Bodhinayake is the architect who oversaw the transformation of the hotel. The hotel began its operations in 1996 as The Tea Factory Hotel. The hotel won the merit award at the 2001 UNESCO Asia Pacific Heritage Awards. The hotel is relaunched as Heritance Tea Factory at the end of 2009.

== History ==
The hotel was a concept of G. C. Wickremasinghe, a Aitken Spence director. On a visit to Hethersett Tea Estate in 1992, Wickremasinghe saw the old, unmaintained tea factory and envisioned converting the tea factory into a hotel. Archiecht Nihal Bodhinayake oversaw the transformation of the hotel. The public spaces and main service facilities are concentrated on the ground floor. The upper floor rooms used for wilting tea are converted to 50 bedrooms. For his conversion of the tea factory, Bodhinayake received a commendation in the South Asia Architecture Awards in 1996. The Tea Factory Hotel commenced operations in the same year. The hotel won the merit award at the UNESCO Asia Pacific Heritage Awards in 2001.

The Tea Factory Hotel is the country's first theme hotel. The hotel was rebranded as Heritance Tea Factory on 15 December 2009. It was the fourth hotel to be launched under the Heritance brand. Heritance Kandalama, Heritance Ahungalla and Heritance Madurai were the other three. The hotel is located at an elevation of about 2,000 metres (6,600 ft) above sea level. Even though there is a global demand for historic-plantation based accommodations, the government's intervention has been minimal in developing and marketing such accommodations.

== Amenities ==
The hotel's reception hall which was the old drying room incorporates a steel latticed atrium. The hotel has two fine dining restaurants: Kenmare and the TCK 6685 Restaurant. Kenmare restaurant offers a la carte menu. The TCK restaurant is created out of a train car. It serves seven-course meals.

== See also ==
- List of hotels in Sri Lanka
