= Aitken Spence Hotel Holdings =

Sri Lankan hotel holding company

Aitken Spence Hotel Holdings PLC
- Company type: Public
- Traded as: CSE: AHUN.N0000
- ISIN: LK0003N00000
- Industry: Hospitality
- Founded: March 14, 1978; 48 years ago
- Headquarters: Colombo, Sri Lanka
- Areas served: Sri Lanka; Maldives; Oman; India
- Key people: Harry Jayawardena (Chairman); Parakrama Dissanayake (Managing Director)
- Brands: Heritance Hotels & Resorts; Adaaran Resorts; Turyaa Hotels
- Revenue: ▲LKR46.060 billion (2023)
- Operating income: ▲LKR7.310 billion (2023)
- Net income: ▼LKR46 million (2023)
- Total assets: ▲LKR107.952 billion (2023)
- Total equity: ▲LKR30.180 billion (2023)
- Number of employees: ▲2,989 (2023)
- Parent: Aitken Spence
- Website: www.aitkenspencehotels.com

Aitken Spence Hotel Holdings PLC is a hotel chain holding company based in Sri Lanka. The Sri Lankan conglomerate Aitken Spence is the parent company of Aitken Spence Hotel Holdings. The company operates hotels in Sri Lanka, Maldives, Oman and India. Aitken Spence ventured into the hospitality business by building two seaside resorts designed by Geoffrey Bawa. The company was founded in 1978 as Ahungalla Hotels Ltd and is the proprietor of the Hotel Triton. Ahungalla Hotels Ltd was listed on the Colombo Stock Exchange in 1980. In 1994, after acquiring Aitken Spence Hotels Ltd, the company gained control of the properties of the hotel chain. Kandalama Hotel and the Tea Factory Hotel commenced operations in 1994 and 1996 respectively. The company opened its first resort in the Maldives in 1993.

Ahungalla Hotel Ltd changed its name to Aitken Spence Hotel Holdings in 1997. The "Heritance" brand launched in 2006 with Hotel Triton relaunched as Heritance Ahungalla. The company partnered with RIU Hotels to build a 500-room resort in Ahungalla at a cost of US$100 million in 2014. The second hotel brand, "Turyaa" was introduced in 2015 and the company opened Turyaa Chennai, the chain's first owned property in India. Heritance Negombo reopened in 2016 after an LKR5 billion renovation. Heritance Aarah, Aitken Spence's latest resort in the Maldives opened in 2019. Aitken Spence Hotel Holdings is one of the LMD 100 companies in Sri Lanka. The hotel chain has a 2,826-room inventory across 21 properties. The company owns and operates 15 properties and manages six properties.

== History ==
Aitken Spence ventured into the hospitality sector by building two Geoffrey Bawa-designed hotels. Hotel Neptune (currently known as Heritance Ayurveda) was built in 1973 and Hotel Triton (present-day Heritance Ahungalla) commenced operations in 1981. Aitken Spence named its first hotel after Neptune, the Roman god of the sea. The second hotel was named after Triton, the son of Neptune. Aitken Spence Hotel Holdings was incorporated in 1978 as Ahungalla Hotels Ltd, the proprietor of Hotel Triton. Ahungalla Hotels Ltd was listed on the Colombo Stock Exchange in 1980. In 1994, Ahungalla Hotels Ltd acquired the proprietor of Hotel Neptune, Aitken Spence Hotels Ltd, thus acquiring control of Hotel Neptune, Kandalama Hotel and Pearl Beach Hotel. Kandalama Hotel and the Tea Factory Hotel were opened in 1994 and 1996 respectively. The company ventured into the Maldives in 1993, the first Sri Lankan company to do so.

Ahungalla Hotels Ltd was renamed Aitken Spence Hotel Holdings in 1997. In 2006, the company rolled out its "Heritance" brand. Hotel Triton was relaunched as Heritance Ahungalla in June 2006 after a US$12 million refurbishment. Aitken Spence entered the hospitality sector of Oman by signing an agreement with Oman Hotels and Tourism Company to manage four of their hotels in 2008. The deal added 406 rooms to the company's inventory. The company acquired Golden Sun Resort in Kalutara in 2010. Previously, the company only managed the property. Aitken Spence partnered with Spanish hotel chain RIU to build a 500-room resort in Ahungalla in 2014. The US$100 million project was approved by the Board of Investment of Sri Lanka.

Aitken Spence Hotels launched its new brand "Turyaa" at the London World Travel Market in 2015. Turyaa Chennai was opened in the same year and Turyaa Kalutara planned to be open in the following year. Aitken Spence acquired Al Falaj Hotel in Oman 2016 for US$36 million in 2016. The company has been managing the hotel since 2008. Aitken Spence Hotels reopened Heritance Negombo in 2016 after spending an LKR5 billion on refurbishment. The hotel was previously known as the Browns Beach Hotel. RIU Sri Lanka was launched in 2016 and the hotel became the first RIU hotel launched in Asia. Aitken Spence Hotels divested its total stake in Hotel Hilltop, Kandy in 2017 for LKR740 million. The buyer was former MP Earl Gunasekara. Heritance Aarah, which has 150 water villas commenced operations in 2019.

== Operations ==
Aitken Spence Hotel Holdings is an LMD 100 company. LMD 100 ranks listed companies in Sri Lanka by revenue annually. In the 2020/21 edition published in 2022, Aitken Spence Hotel Holdings ranked 91st down from 55th rank in the previous year due to a 70% revenue decline. The hotel chain has a 2,826 room inventory across 21 properties. Aitken Spence Hotel Holdings owns and operates 15 properties and manages six properties. The hotel chain promotes its properties in brands, "Heritance Hotels and Resorts", "Adaaran Resorts" and "Turyaa Hotels".

=== Properties ===
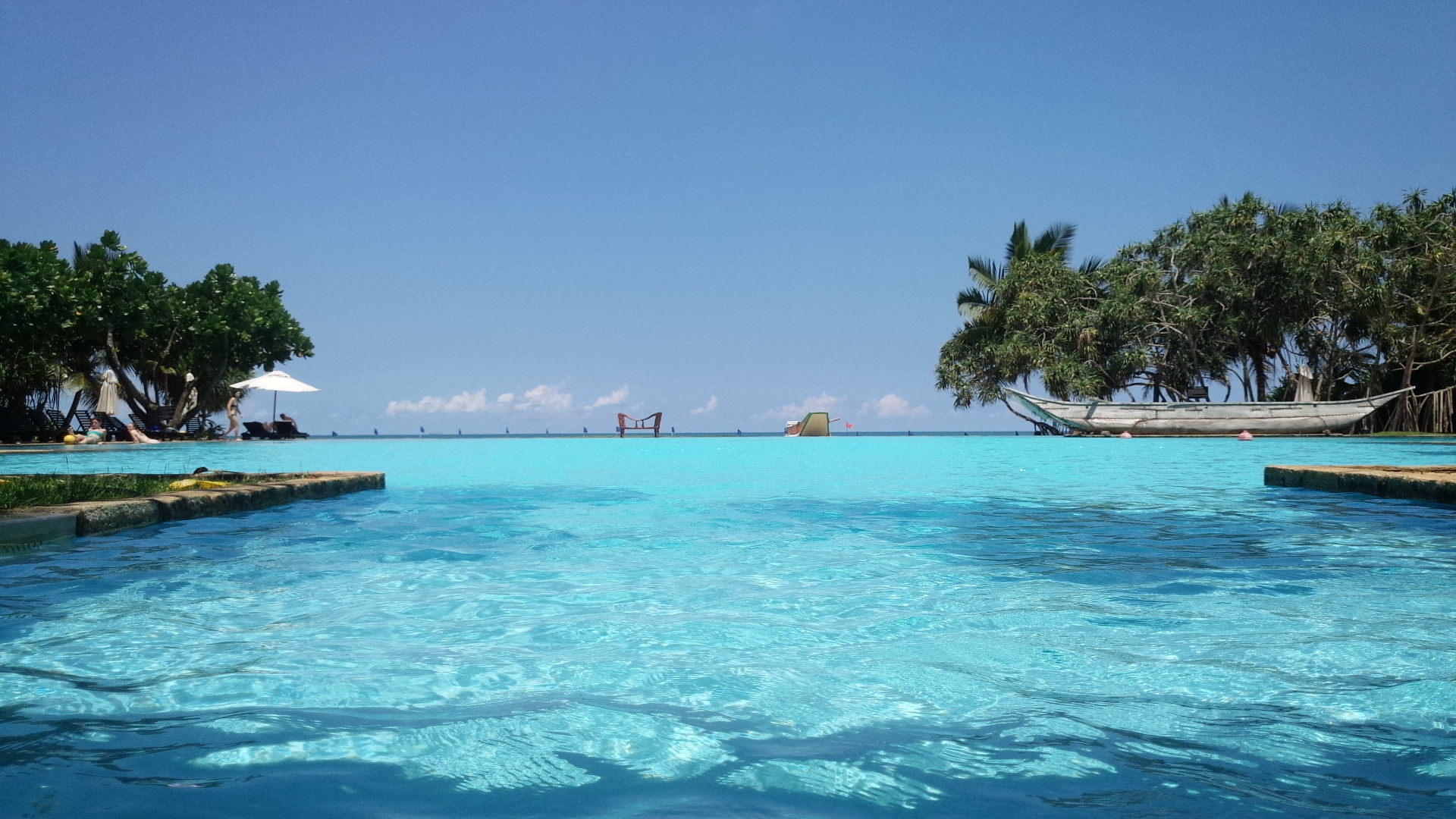
Heritance Ahungalla originally known as Hotel Triton was the second hotel built in the Aitken Spence hotel chain

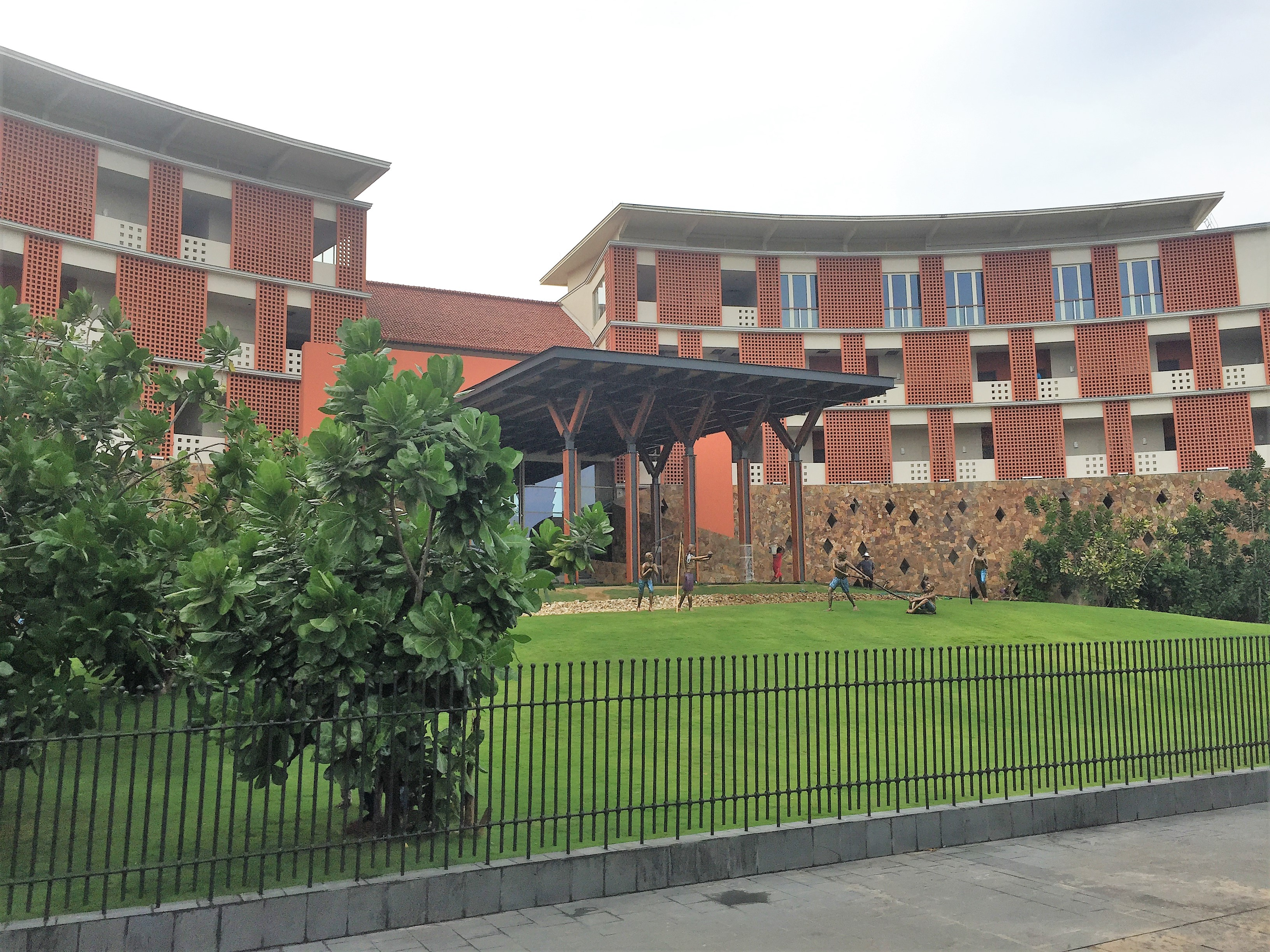
Heritance Negombo reopened in 2016 after LKR5 billion refurbishment

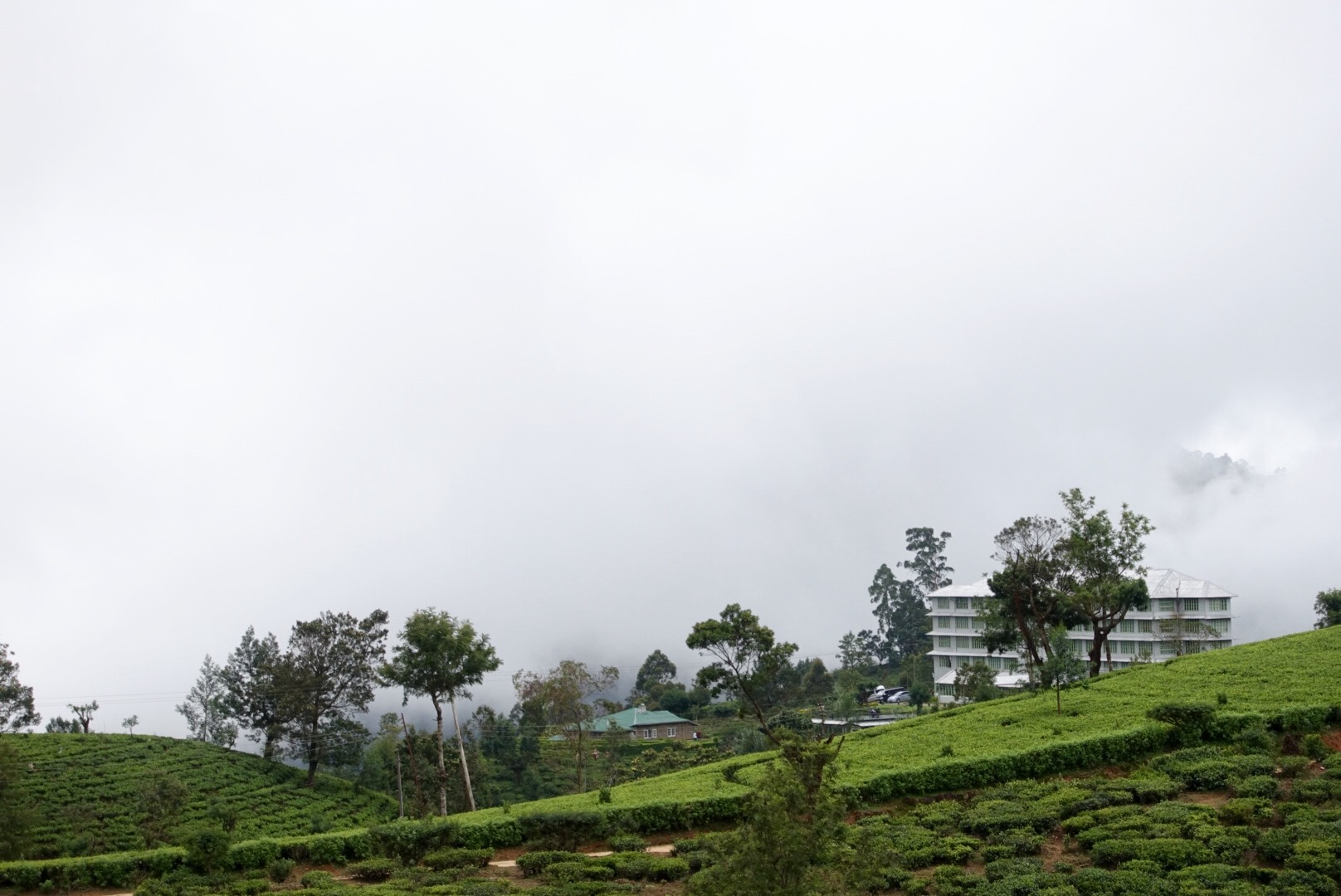
Heritance Tea Factory commenced operations in 1996, built in an abandoned tea factory

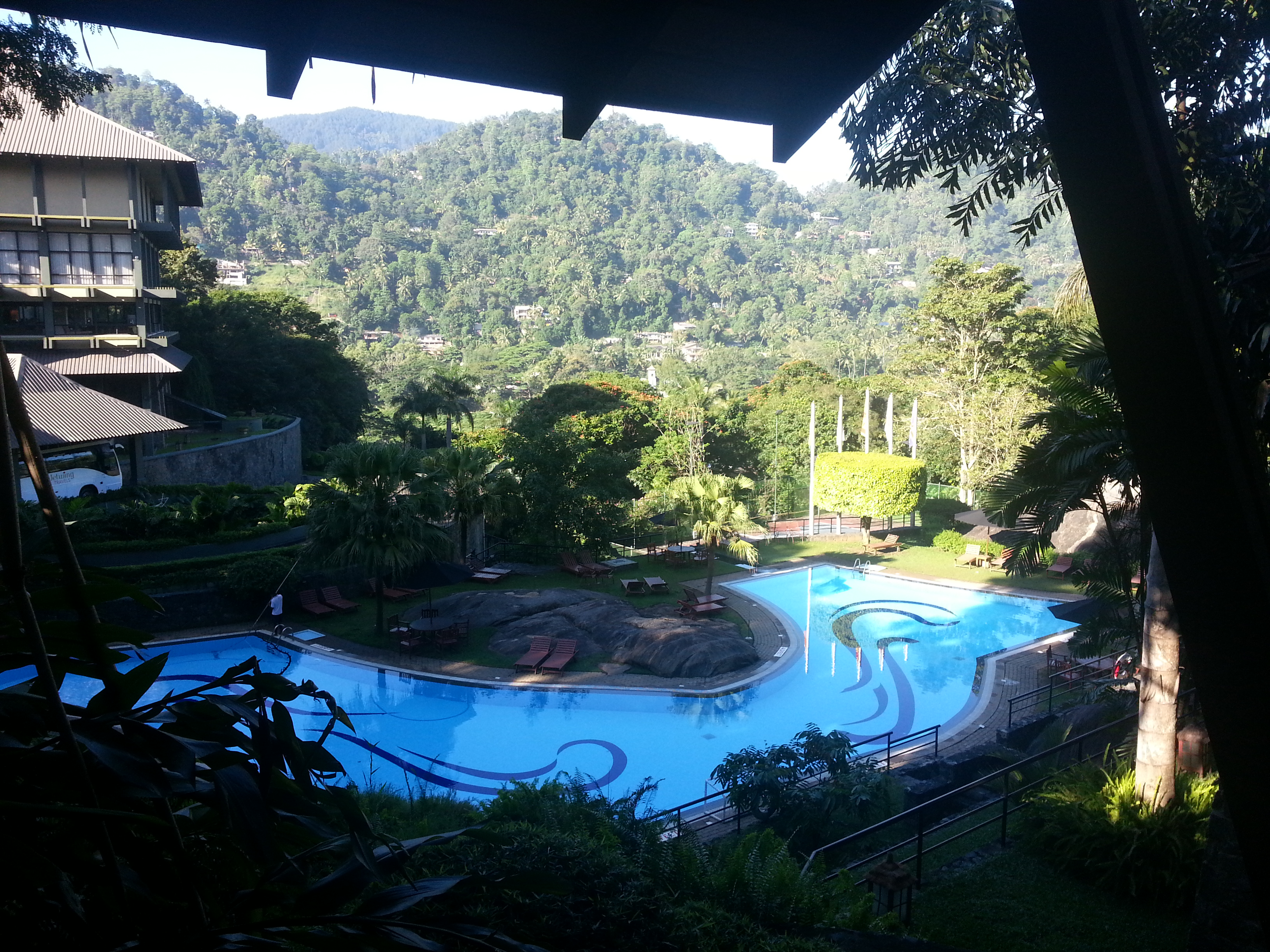
Earl's Regency, one of the three properties managed by Aitken Spence Hotel Holdings

| Property | Proprietor | Location | No. of rooms |
|---|---|---|---|
Owned properties
Heritance Hotels & Resorts
| Heritance Aarah | Cowrie Investments (Pvt) Ltd | Maldives | 150 |
| Heritance Ahungalla | Aitken Spence Hotel Holdings PLC | Ahungalla | 152 |
| Heritance Ayurveda | Aitken Spence Hotels Ltd | Beruwala | 64 |
| Heritance Negombo | Negombo Beach Resorts (Pvt) Ltd | Negombo | 143 |
| Heritance Kandalama | Kandalama Hotels (Pvt) Ltd | Dambulla | 152 |
| Heritance Tea Factory | Hethersett Hotels Ltd | Nuwara Eliya | 51 |
Adaaran Resorts
| Adaaran Club Rannalhi | Jetan Travel Services Co. (Pvt) Ltd | Maldives | 122 |
| Adaaran Prestige Vadoo | Unique Resorts (Pvt) Ltd | Maldives | 50 |
| Adaaran Select Hudhuranfushi | ADS Resorts (Pvt) Ltd | Maldives | 197 |
| Adaaran Select Meedhuparu | Cowrie Investments (Pvt) Ltd | Maldives | 215 |
Turyaa Hotels
| Turyaa Chennai | Aitken Spence Hotel Managements (South India) Pvt Ltd | Chennai, India | 140 |
| Turyaa Kalutara | Turyaa (Pvt) Ltd | Kalutara | 109 |
Aitken Spence Hotels
| Al Falaj Hotel | Aitken Spence Resorts (Middle East) LLC | Oman | 150 |
| Amethyst Resort | Paradise Resorts Passikudah (Pvt) Ltd | Pasikudah | 38 |
RIU Hotels
| Hotel RIU Sri Lanka | Ahungalla Resorts Ltd | Ahungalla | 501 |
Managed properties
Aitken Spence Hotels
| Desert Nights Camp | Oman Hotels and Tourism Company | Oman | 86 Bedouin tents |
| Earl's Regency | Earl's Hotels | Kandy | 116 |
| Sur Plaza Hotel | Oman Hotels and Tourism Company | Oman | 105 |

Source: Annual Report, 2022/23 (pp. 12, 76-80, 267)

== Finances ==
Ten-year financial summary
| Year | Revenue LKR mns | Profit LKR mns | Assets LKR mns | Earnings per share LKR |
|---|---|---|---|---|
| 2023 | 46,060 | 46 | 107,952 | (0.94) |
| 2022 | 24,571 | 1,034 | 101,640 | 1.85 |
| 2021 | 5,728 | (7,253) | 74,168 | (13.93) |
| 2020 | 19,019 | (896) | 74,350 | (1.90) |
| 2019 | 19,571 | 1,197 | 64,902 | 2.37 |
| 2018 | 18,251 | 1,583 | 58,593 | 3.43 |
| 2017 | 16,055 | 1,014 | 52,178 | 1.97 |
| 2016 | 13,378 | 2,088 | 38,448 | 4.13 |
| 2015 | 13,271 | 3,436 | 32,788 | 6.60 |
| 2014 | 12,947 | 3,517 | 25,977 | 6.92 |

Source: Annual Report, 2022/23 (p. 266)

== See also ==
- List of companies listed on the Colombo Stock Exchange
