= Rajapaksha College =

Rajapaksha College, Ahungalla, is one of the oldest secondary schools in southern Sri Lanka. Founded in 1879, it is also the 2nd oldest Buddhist school in Sri Lanka. It currently has a student population of 1,400, along with 62 faculty led by principal Swarna De Silva. Education is available from grades 1 to 13 and Advanced Level students are able to choose between commerce and arts streams.

== Computer division ==
A computer division was recently added to Rajapaksha College with aid from the secondary school modernisation project of the Asian Development Bank.
