= Meedhupparu =

Meedhupparu މީދުއްޕަރު
- Uninhabited Island
- Location within Maldives
- Coordinates: 5.456°N 72.980°E

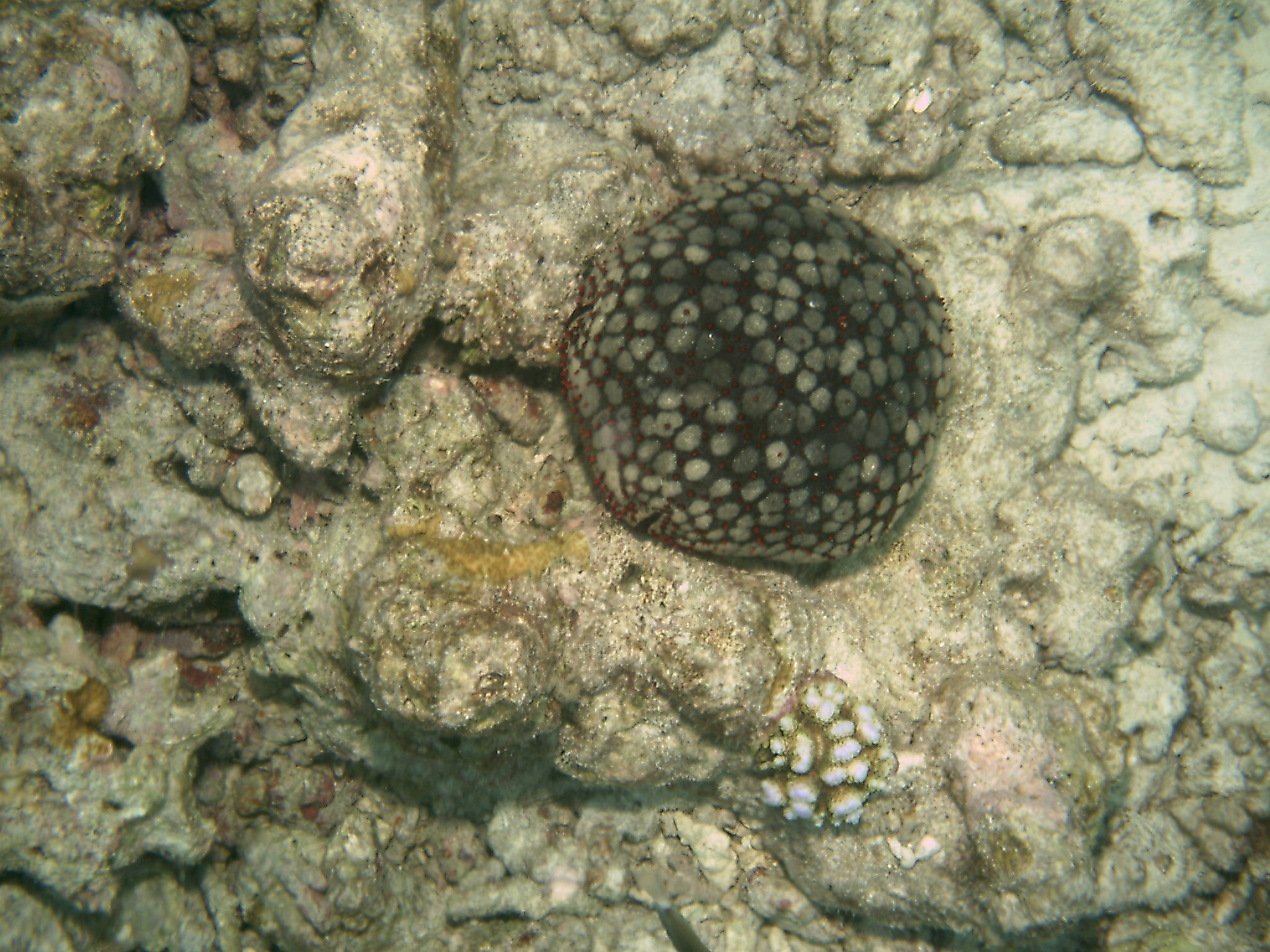
A sea star living on the reef.

Meedhupparu is a coral island on the east of the Northern Maalhosmadulu Atoll in the Maldives. Following the El Niño current that decimated the Maldives' surface coral in the late 1990s, the lagoon surrounding the island is full of dead coral, but is now interspersed with much new growth and the sea life is returning. The island was for the most part unaffected by the tsunami of December 2004.
