= Destination management =

Professional travel services company with local knowledge

A destination management company (DMC) is a professional services company with local knowledge, expertise and resources, working in the design and implementation of events, activities, tours, transportation and program logistics.

There are very few destination management organizations. Management implies control, and rarely does a tourism organisation have control over the destination's resources, such as in the case of the New Zealand government's development of the resort town of Rotorua in the first half of the 20th century. The majority of these entities are regarded as destination marketing organizations.

A DMC provides a ground service based on local knowledge of its given destinations. These services can be transportation, hotel accommodation, restaurants, activities, excursions, conference venues, themed events, gala dinners and logistics, meetings, incentive schemes as well as helping with overcoming language barriers. By acting as purchasing consortia, DMCs can provide preferential rates based on the buying power they have with their preferred suppliers.

== See also ==
- Travel agency
- Tour operator
