= CINEC Campus =

CINEC Campus (Pvt) Ltd
- Type: Private
- Established: 1990; 36 years ago
- Affiliations: Dalian Maritime University; University of Wolverhampton; Australian Maritime College; Dublin Metropolitan University; Worchester University
- Chancellor: P. K. Mukherjee
- President: Ajith Peiris
- Location: Malabe, Western Province, Sri Lanka
- Campus: Urban
- Language: English
- Colors: Blue
- Website: www.cinec.edu

The CINEC campus (pronounced /ˈsɪnɛk/ SIN-eck) is a Sri Lankan private institute of higher education. It is registered as a private limited liability company under the Companies Act. It is also the largest maritime educational training facility approved by the Directorate of Merchant Shipping in Sri Lanka. Established in 1990, The main CINEC Campus is located in Malabe with branches in Colombo (Metro Branch), Jaffna and Trincomalee. CINEC also opened two overseas branches in Fiji and the Seychelles.

CINEC Campus caters to over 20,000 students annually, who follow a range of over 200 educational and training programs. However they specialize in their officer cadet programmes which include maritime sciences, marine electrical engineering and marine engineering.
