= Ahungalla =

- Town
- Location in Sri Lanka
- Coordinates: 6°19′12″N 80°1′12″E
- Country: Sri Lanka
- Province: Southern Province
- District: Galle District
- Time zone: UTC+5:30 (Sri Lanka Standard Time Zone)
  - Summer (DST): UTC+6 (Summer time)
- Postal code: 80562
- Area code: 228

Ahungalla is a small coastal town, located in Galle District, Southern Province, Sri Lanka, governed by an Urban Council. It is approximately 76.6 kilometres (47.6 mi) south of Colombo and is situated at an elevation of 12 metres (39 ft) above the sea level.

== History ==
Ahungalla is known primarily for its sandy beach, accompanied by a wide palm belt, considered to be one of the best on the island.

The village is located about 15 kilometres (9.3 mi) south of Bentota, 40 kilometres (25 mi) north of the provincial capital Galle at Cape Point Ahungalla. The neighboring villages are Kosgoda to the north and Balapitiya in the south. Southeast of the town is the mangrove area of Madu Ganga.

The largest and most well-known building in the town is the luxury hotel, Heritance Ahungalla (formerly Hotel Triton), designed by notable Sri Lankan architect, Geoffrey Bawa, and constructed from 1979 to 1981.

As with the entire region Ahungalla was devastated by the tsunami caused by the 2004 Indian Ocean earthquake.

== Transport ==
Ahungalla is located on the Coastal or Southern Rail Line (connecting Colombo through to Matara), and the A2 highway, connecting Colombo to Wellawaya.

== Facilities ==
- Ahungalla railway station - few trains however stop at this station
- Rajapaksha College

== Attractions ==
- Ahungalla beach

== See also ==
- List of beaches in Sri Lanka
