= Heritance Kandalama =

- Heritance Kandalama logo

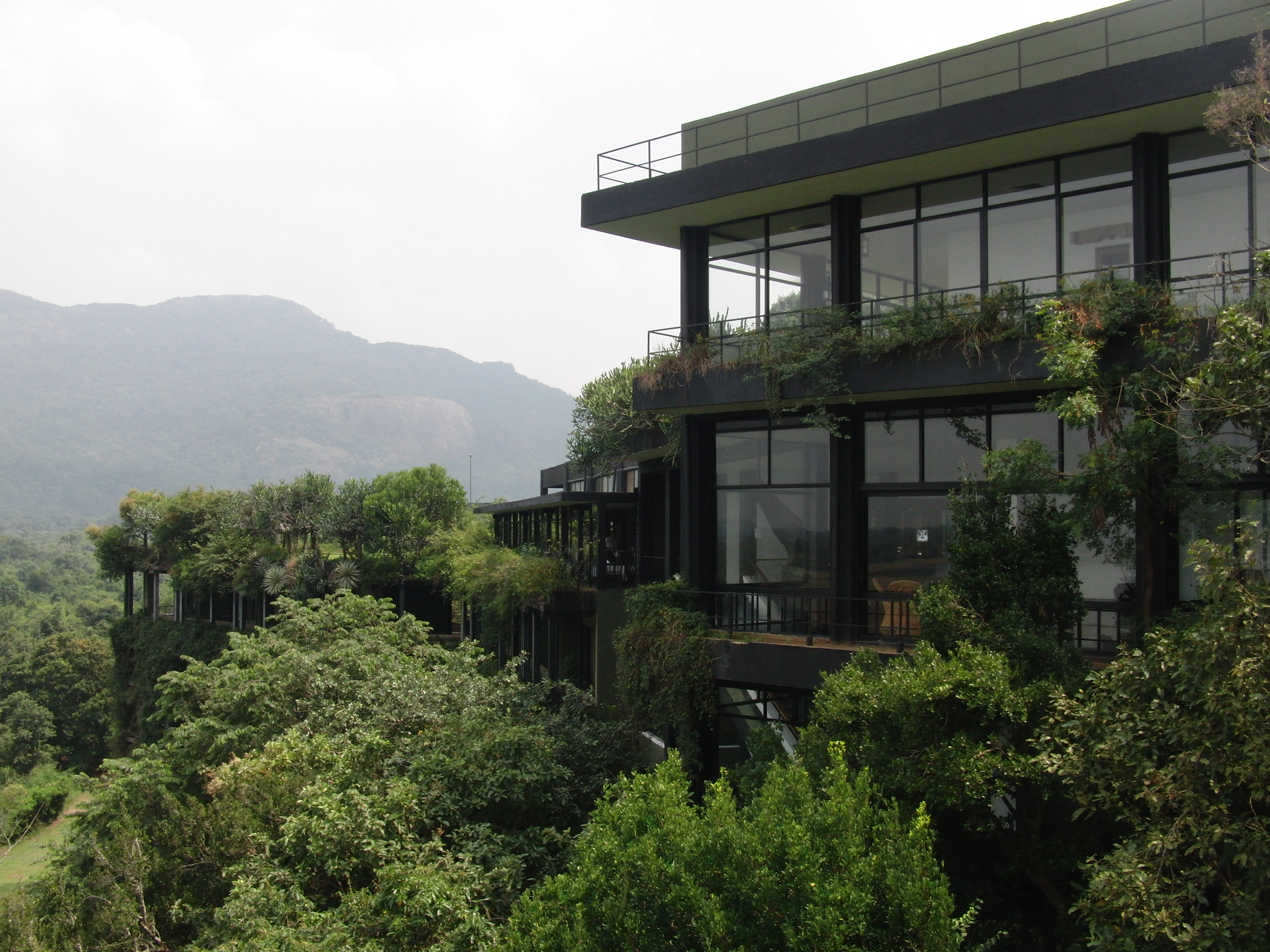
- Exterior of Heritance Kandalama
- Hotel chain: Heritance Hotels and Resorts

General information
- Architectural style: Tropical modernism
- Location: Kandalama, Dambulla, Sri Lanka
- Coordinates: 7°52′16.1″N 80°42′27.7″E
- Opened: 1995
- Owner: Kandalama Hotels (Pvt) Ltd, a sub-subsidiary of Aitken Spence Hotel Holdings

Design and construction
- Architect: Geoffrey Bawa

Other information
- Number of rooms: 152
- Number of suites: 15
- Number of restaurants: 3

Website
- www.heritancehotels.com/kandalama/

Heritance Kandalama, (Sinhala: හෙරිටන්ස් කණ්ඩලම) formerly known as the Kandalama Hotel, is a luxury five-star hotel in Kandalama, Sri Lanka, approximately 11 km (6.8 mi) south-east of Sigiriya. The hotel was built in 1991 and designed by Geoffrey Bawa. The hotel is owned and operated by Aitken Spence Hotel Holdings under its luxury hotel chain, Heritance Hotels and Resorts.

== Architecture ==
The Sri Lankan architect Geoffrey Bawa designed the Kandalama Hotel which was built between 1992 and 1995. The hotel's entrance lobby is situated at the terminus of a sloping 2.7 km (1.7 mi) long private road that branches north from a secondary arterial leading back to the centre of town. Bawa was interested in developing a spatial and visual sequence of entry that culminated in the revelation of the distant view of the monument of Sigiriya only after entry to the hotel lobby. One of the hotel's dominant design features is the large, cave-like porte-cochère abutting the western side of the cliff around which the hotel wraps. A large slanted canopy that angles down towards the entrance to an enclosed tunnel-like walkway, with a boulder-lined wall, with an expansive open-air lobby and panoramic view northward over the Kandalama Reservoir.

Kandalama is the first LEED-certified green building outside of the United States, as well as the first LEED-certified green hotel in the world. In 2000, it was awarded LEED certification as a LEED v1 pilot project.

== History ==
Kandalama Hotels Pvt Ltd is the proprietor of the Kandalama Hotel. Aitken Spence Hotels Ltd, a subsidiary of Aitken Spence Hotel Holdings PLC, controls 63% of the stake in Kandalama Hotels Pvt Ltd. The construction of the hotel was a controversial issue despite its economic advantages to the local economy. The ecological concerns dominated the debate initially, however, the perceived negative impact of the local culture was cited as the reason for opposition later. Heritance Kandalama became the first hotel in Asia to be accredited with the Green Globe standard.

Heritance Kandalama was adjudged as the best five-star hotel at the Presidential Awards for Travel and Tourism for the third consecutive year in 2010. Heritance Kandalama won the gold award at the 2011 National Green Awards concluded at the BMICH. Jeewaka Weerakone, the general manager of the hotel received the award from then-president Mahinda Rajapaksa. The hotel celebrated its 25th anniversary in 2019. The hotel commenced its operations with 80 local employees who had little or no experience in the hospitality industry.

== Amenities ==
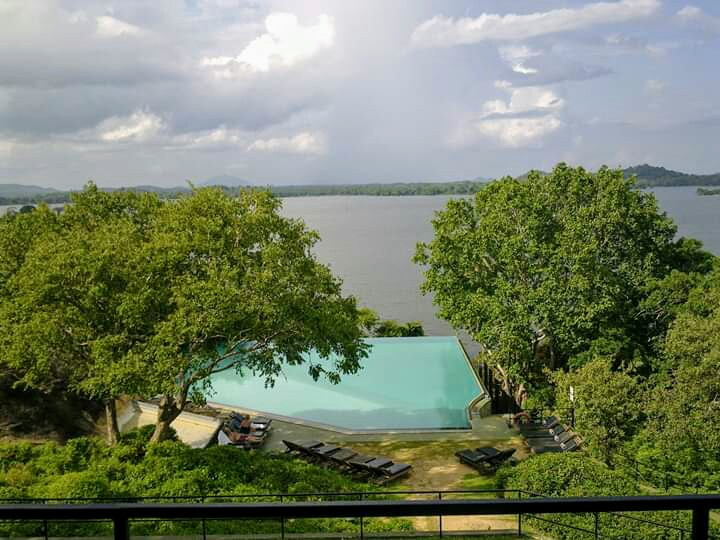
The infinity pool of the hotel overlooks the Kandalama reservoir

The 152-room Heritance Kandalama is situated 12 kilometres (7.5 mi) from Dambulla on the shores of the Kandalama Reservoir. The hotel is six-storeyed. The hotel includes three restaurants and a bar. Kanchana restaurant serves both international and Sri Lankan cuisine. Kaludiya Restaurant and Café Kachchan both are à la carte restaurants. Kanchana bar, the only bar of Heritance Kandalama has a snack menu. An infinity pool, a gym and a spa are the other amenities of the hotel.

== See also ==
- List of hotels in Sri Lanka
