= Kandapola =

Coordinates: 6°59′N 80°49′E

Kandapola කඳපොල
- Village
- Interactive map of Kandapola
- Country: Sri Lanka
- Province: Central Province
- District: Nuwara Eliya District
- Time zone: UTC+5:30 (Sri Lanka Standard Time)

Kandapola (කඳපොල) is a village in Nuwara Eliya, Sri Lanka. It is located within the Central Province.

== See also ==
- List of towns in Central Province, Sri Lanka
