= Heritance Ahungalla =

Building in Ahungalla, Sri Lanka

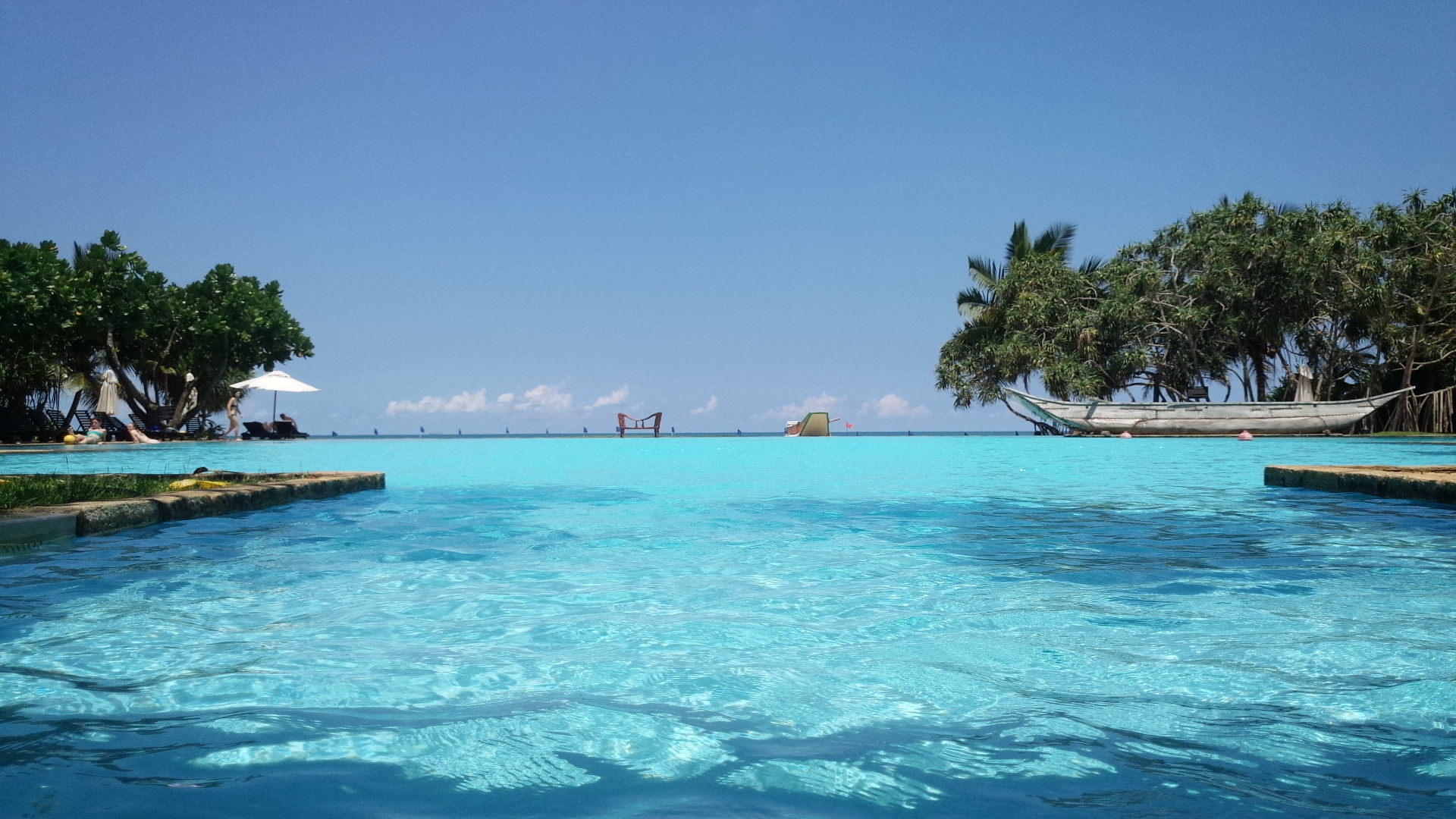
- The infinity pool of Heritance Ahungalla
- Hotel chain: Heritance Hotels and Resorts

General information
- Architectural style: Tropical Modernism
- Town or city: Ahungalla
- Country: Sri Lanka
- Coordinates: 6°18′42.0″N 80°01′55.0″E
- Opened: 1981
- Owner: Aitken Spence Hotel Holdings

Design and construction
- Architect(s): Geoffrey Bawa

Other information
- Number of rooms: 152
- Number of suites: 9
- Number of restaurants: 5

Website
- www.heritancehotels.com/ahungalla/

Heritance Ahungalla, formerly known as the Triton Hotel, is a luxury five-star hotel in Ahungalla, Sri Lanka. Triton Hotel was designed by Geoffrey Bawa and opened in 1981. Aitken Spence Hotel Holdings is the owner and operator of the hotel. The hotel is managed as a part of Aiken Spence's Heritance Hotels and Resorts brand. Aitken Spence Hotel Holdings was incorporated in 1978 as Ahungalla Hotels Ltd and listed on the Colombo Stock Exchange in 1980. The hotel was originally named Triton Hotel after the Greek god Triton. Ahungalla Hotels Ltd became the holding company of the Aitken Spence hotel chain in 1994. The company adopted its present name, Aitken Spence Hotel Holdings, in 1997. After a US$12 million refurbishment, Triton Hotel was rebranded as Heritance Ahungalla in 2006. Heritance Ahungalla is the first five-star beach resort in Sri Lanka.

== History ==
In 1979 Aitken Spence commissioned Sri Lankan architect Geoffrey Bawa to design a 125-room beachfront hotel on the site. Construction on the hotel was completed in 1981 and it opened in the same year. Ahungalla Hotels Ltd, renamed in 1997 as Aitken Spence Hotel Holdings, is the owner and the operator of the hotel. Ahungalla Hotels Ltd was incorporated in 1978. The company was listed on the Colombo Stock Exchange in 1980. Triton Hotel was the second hotel built in the Aitken Spence Hotels chain. Having named the first hotel of the chain after the god Neptune, the hotel was named after Triton, son of Poseidon, the Greek equivalent of Neptune. The company acquired Aitken Spence Hotels Ltd, the owner of Neptune Hotel, in 1994 and became the holding company of the Aitken Spence hotel chain.

Triton Hotel was damaged by the 2004 Indian Ocean tsunami. Aitken Spence had decided not to recommence operations of the hotel immediately because the hotel was planned to be closed for refurbishment in the following year anyway. After a US$12 million refurbishment, Triton Hotel was rebranded as Heritance Ahungalla in 2006 as a five-star hotel. The hotel became the first five-star beach resort in the country.

In 2012, Heritance Ahungalla offered "Pirates Fantasy", what the hotel called the 'most expensive cake in the world' priced at US$35 million. The cake had several layers with different ingredients, including cinnamon, zucchini and purple yam. The cake was decorated with ten different sapphire gems and ten different jewellery. The cake was unveiled with Sri Lankan and English national cricketers in attendance. Out of the 400 staff of the hotel more than 65% were recruited from nearby villages, and many of them have not had prior work experience in the hospitality industry. Latvian president Raimonds Vējonis and the first lady Iveta Vējone stayed at the hotel during their 2018 ten-day state visit to Sri Lanka.

== Architecture ==
The longitudinal axis of the hotel building runs parallel to the coastline. The centrepiece of the three-storey reinforced concrete building is the spacious open-air entrance, which seamlessly blends interior and exterior spaces, connecting the building with the surrounding natural environment. Bawa intentionally placed a small interior pond at the entrance, reflective polished floors in the lobby, and an infinity pool, at precisely the same level, in order to emphasise the visual flow through the building to the ocean.

The hotel has a 16 m (52 ft) wide hallway, lined by guest rooms, running parallel to the ocean. The corridor has a number of small square garden courtyards, bordered by open air spaces. The infinity pool comprises irregularly shaped rectangular blocks, which are 35 m (115 ft) wide at each of its extremes.

The hotel features simple and clean architectural detailing with very little ornamentation. The concrete walls, columns and ceilings are painted a pale gold tone with white trim. The interior spaces are light and airy, with pale tiled floors and neutral tone carpets. The planters in the open-air lobbies and hallways continue the theme of blurring the interior and exterior spaces.

== Amenities ==
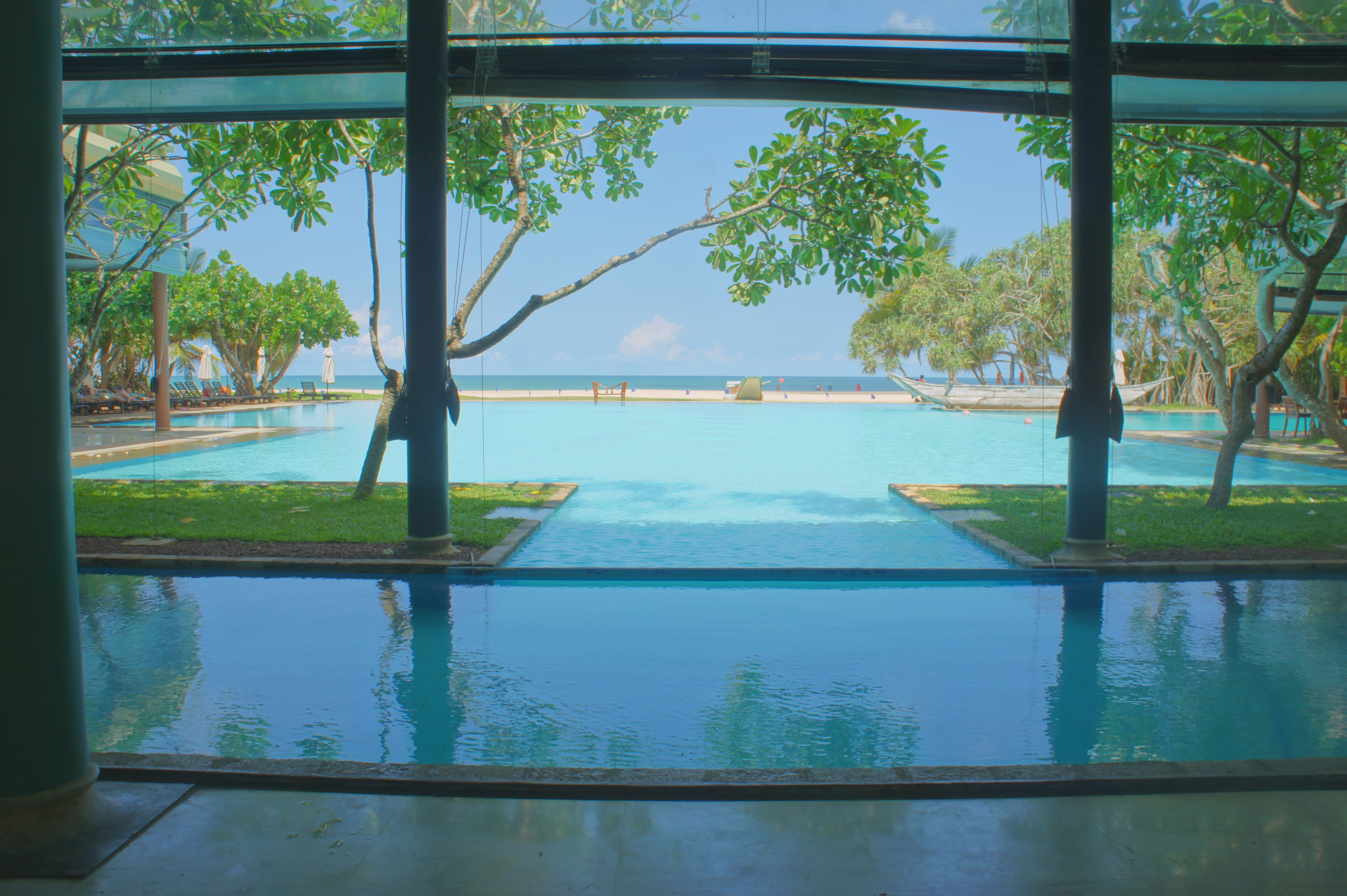
The interior of the hotel

Heritance Ahungalla is a hotel with 152 rooms. The hotel's access road is an avenue with palm trees winding around a large pond. The hotel has two swimming pools. The older pool is visible from the entrance terrace. The newer pool is in the northern wing. The hotel's fine dining restaurant accompanies a dramatic view and the hotel also has a nightclub. Meals from the nightclub and the main dining room are mainly buffets. The main restaurant gets it name, Jute, from batik-on-jute ceiling decoration by Ena de Silva. The hotel is a popular destination for MICE tourism. The hotel has an in-house fine spa.

== See also ==
- List of hotels in Sri Lanka
