= List of companies of Sri Lanka =

Location of Sri Lanka

Sri Lanka is an island country located southeast of the Republic of India and northeast of the Maldives. According to the International Monetary Fund, Sri Lanka's GDP in terms of purchasing power parity is second only to the Maldives in the South Asian region in terms of per capita income.

As of 2010, the service sector makes up 60% of GDP, the industrial sector 28%, and the agriculture sector 12%. The private sector accounts for 85% of the economy. India is Sri Lanka's largest trading partner. Economic disparities exist between the provinces, with the Western province contributing 45.1% of the GDP and the Southern province and the Central province contributing 10.7% and 10%, respectively.

== Largest firms ==
LMD 100, dubbed as "Sri Lanka's Fortune 500", annually lists the leading 100 quoted companies in Sri Lanka. Only the top 20 companies are listed below. All revenue figures reported before the financial year ending 2024.

2023/24 Rank	2022/23 Rank	Company	Revenue 2022/23 Rs (mns)	Revenue 2021/22 Rs (mns)
1	2	Hayleys	487,431	338,010
2	7	Commercial Bank of Ceylon	280,387	163,675
3	3	LOLC Holdings	333,122	224,100
4	9	Hatton National Bank	270,509	135,710
5	8	John Keells Holdings	276,640	218,075
6	4	Carson Cumberbatch	330,459	170,695
7	5	Bukit Darah	330,421	170,656
8	6	Lanka IOC	281,488	89,951
9	10	Sampath Bank	206,002	113,075
10	11	C T Holdings	196,266	136,873
11	12	Cargills (Ceylon)	195,618	136,692
12	13	Dialog Axiata	178,131	141,915
13	14	Melstacorp	178,082	106,071
14	15	Ceylon Cold Stores	126,149	84,543
15	18	National Development Bank	111,552	64,083
16	16	Vallibel One	116,855	96,859
17	17	Hemas Holdings	113,940	78,831
18	22	Seylan Bank	96,836	54,751
19	21	Ceylon Beverage Holdings	96,939	60,211
20	24	Lion Brewery (Ceylon)	94,969	58,871

== Notable firms ==
This list includes notable companies with primary headquarters located in the country. The industry and sector follow the Industry Classification Benchmark taxonomy. Organisations which have ceased operations are included and noted as defunct.

Notable companies Status: P=Private, S=State; A=Active, D=Defunct
Name	Industry	Sector	Headquarters	Founded	Notes	Status	
Aitken Spence	Conglomerates	-	Colombo	1868	Hotels, logistics, energy	P	A
Associated Newspapers of Ceylon Limited	Consumer services	Publishing	Colombo	1926	Publishing	S	A
Bank of Ceylon	Financials	Banks	Colombo	1939	State commercial bank	S	A
Barefoot	Consumer goods	Clothing & accessories	Colombo	1958	Clothing & accessories, furnishings	P	A
Airtel Sri Lanka	Telecommunications	Mobile telecommunications	Colombo	2009	Mobile network, part of Bharti Airtel (India)	P	A
CameraLK	Electronic items	Electronics	Colombo	2010	camera, electronic devices	P	A
Cargills	Conglomerates	-	Colombo	1844	Consumer goods, retail, financials	P	A
Ceylinco Consolidated	Conglomerates	-	Colombo	1938	Financials, technology, health care, travel & leisure	P	A
Ceylon Biscuits Limited	Consumer goods	Food products	Colombo	1939	Food manufacturer and confectionary	P	A
Ceylon Cold Stores	Consumer goods	Food products	Colombo	1866	Food products	P	A
Ceylon Electricity Board	Utilities	Conventional electricity	Colombo	1969	State electrical distribution and generation	S	A
Ceylon Petroleum Corporation	Oil & gas	Exploration & production	Colombo	1962	Petrochemical refining and sales	S	A
Ceylon Tobacco Company	Consumer goods	Tobacco	Colombo	1932	Tobacco products	P	A
Cinnamon Air	Consumer services	Airlines	Colombo	2012	Domestic airline	P	A
Colombo Dockyard	Industrials	Commercial vehicles & trucks	Colombo	1974	Ship building	P	A
Commercial Bank of Ceylon	Financials	Banks	Colombo	1920	Commercial bank	P	A
Country Style Foods Private Limited	Consumer goods	Food products	Colombo	1981	Beverage and dairy	P	A
Daintee	Consumer goods	Food products	Colombo	1984	Confectionery, food products	P	A
Damro	Consumer goods	Furniture, Homeware Manufacturer	Colombo	1986	Furniture, Plantations, Electronic appliances	P	A
DFCC Bank	Financials	Banks	Colombo	1955	Development bank	P	A
Dialog Axiata	Telecommunications	Mobile telecommunications	Colombo	1993	Mobile networks, broadband, part of Axiata Group (Malaysia)	P	A
Dialog Broadband Networks	Telecommunications	Fixed line telecommunications	Colombo	2005	Broadband	P	A
Dialog TV	Consumer services	Broadcasting & entertainment	Colombo	2005	Broadcasting, part of Axiata Group (Malaysia)	P	A
Dilmah	Consumer goods	Soft drinks	Colombo	1988	Tea, beverages	P	A
Distilleries Company of Sri Lanka	Consumer goods	Distillers & vintners	Colombo	1913	Distilleries and other non-alcoholic goods	P	A
Durdans Hospital	Health care	Health care providers	Colombo	1945	Hospital	P	A
Etisalat	Telecommunications	Mobile telecommunications	Colombo	1989	Mobile network, part of Etisalat (UAE)	P	A
Expolanka Holdings	Conglomerates	-	Colombo	1978	Logistics, travel & leisure, manufacturing	P	A
ExpoRail	Consumer services	Travel & tourism	Colombo	2011	Commuter railroads, part of Expolanka Holdings	P	A
FitsAir	Consumer services	Airlines	Colombo	1997	Scheduled airline	P	A
Gateway Group	Consumer services	Specialised consumer services	Colombo	1986	Education	P	A
George Steuart Group	Conglomerates	-	Colombo	1835	Food & beverages, health care, travel & leisure	P	A
Hatton National Bank	Financials	Banks	Colombo	1888	Private bank	P	A
Hayleys	Conglomerates	-	Colombo	1878	Industrials, consumer goods, travel & leisure	P	A
Hemas Holdings	Conglomerates	-	Colombo	1948	Health care, transportation, consumer goods	P	A
Hemas Hospitals	Health care	Health care providers	Colombo	2008	Hospital chain	P	A
Hutch	Telecommunications	Mobile telecommunications	Colombo	1991	Mobile network, part of Hutchison Asia Telecom Group (Hong Kong)	P	A
Independent Television Network	Consumer services	Broadcasting & entertainment	Colombo	1979	Broadcasting	S	A
Island Tea	Consumer goods	Soft drinks	Philippines	2017	Tea, beverages	P	A
JAT Holdings	Conglomerate	-	Colombo	1993	Paints and related products, Furnishing, Real estate, Exports	P	A
Jetwing Hotels	Consumer services	Hotels	Colombo	1973	Hotel chain	P	A
John Keells IT	Technology	Software	Colombo	1998	IT services, part of John Keells Holdings	P	A
John Keells Holdings	Conglomerates	-	Colombo	1870	Transportation, logistics, retail, financials	P	A
Lanka Bell	Telecommunications	Mobile telecommunications	Colombo	1997	Mobile network, part of Melstacorp	P	A
Lanka Hospitals	Health care	Health care providers	Colombo	2002	Hospital	P	A
LAUGFS Holdings	Conglomerates	-	Colombo	1995	Oil & gas, real estate, industrials	P	A
Leader Publications	Consumer services	Publishing	Colombo	1994	Publishing	P	A
Maliban Biscuit Manufactories Limited	Consumer goods	Food products	Colombo	1954	Food products	P	A
MAS Holdings	Conglomerates	-	Colombo	1986	Fabrics, clothing, financial services	P	A
MBC Networks	Consumer services	Broadcasting & entertainment	Colombo	1993	Broadcasting, part of Capital Maharaja	P	A
Melstacorp	Conglomerates	-	Colombo	1998	Food & beverage, logistics, energy, technology	P	A
Micro Cars	Consumer goods	Automobiles	Colombo	1995	Motor vehicle manufacturer	P	A
Mihin Lanka	Consumer services	Airlines	Colombo	2006	Airline, defunct 2016	P	D
MillenniumIT ESP	Technology	Software	Colombo	1996	IT	P	A
Mobitel	Telecommunications	Mobile telecommunications	Colombo	1993	Mobile network, part of Sri Lanka Telecom	P	A
MTV Channel	Consumer services	Broadcasting & entertainment	Colombo	1992	Broadcasting, part of Capital Maharaja	P	A
National Savings Bank	Financials	Banks	Colombo	1971	State savings bank	S	A
Nations Trust Bank	Financials	Banks	Colombo	1999	Bank	P	A
Nawaloka Hospital	Health care	Health care providers	Colombo	1985	Hospital	P	A
Neville Fernando Teaching Hospital	Health care	Health care providers	Colombo	2013	Hospital	P	A
Pan Asia Bank	Financials	Banks	Colombo	1995	Bank	P	A
Pelwatte Sugar Industries	Consumer goods	Food products	Buttala	1981	Sugar	P	A
People's Bank	Financials	Banks	Colombo	1961	Commercial bank	S	A
Rainco	Consumer goods	Personal products	Dehiwala-Mount Lavinia	1977	Personal goods	P	A
Richard Pieris & Company	Conglomerates	-	Colombo	1940	Manufacturing, Engineering, Retail and Plantation	P	A
Sampath Bank	Financials	Banks	Colombo	1986	Commercial bank	P	A
Sarasavi Bookshop	Consumer services	Specialty retailers	Colombo	1973	Book store chain	P	A
Seylan Bank	Financials	Banks	Colombo	1987	Commercial bank	P	A
Simplifly	Consumer services	Airlines	Colombo	2004	Charter airline	P	A
Softlogic Holdings	Conglomerates	-	Colombo	1991	I/T, health care, retail, financials	P	A
Sri Lanka Broadcasting Corporation	Consumer services	Broadcasting & entertainment	Colombo	1925	Broadcasting	S	A
Sri Lanka Insurance	Financials	Full line insurance	Colombo	1961	Insurance	S	A
Sri Lanka Ports Authority	Industrials	Marine transportation	Colombo	1979	Marine shipping	S	A
Sri Lanka Railways	Industrials	Railroads	Colombo	1858	Railroads	S	A
Sri Lanka Rupavahini Corporation	Consumer services	Broadcasting & entertainment	Colombo	1982	Broadcasting	S	A
Sri Lanka Telecom	Telecommunications	Fixed line telecommunications	Colombo	1991	Telecom, ISP	S	A
Sri Lanka Transport Board	Industrials	Delivery services	Colombo	1958	Transportation services	S	A
SriLankan Airlines	Consumer services	Airlines	Colombo	1979	Flag airline	S	A
SupremeSAT	Industrials	Aerospace	Colombo	2011	Satellite operator	P	A
Upali Newspapers	Consumer services	Publishing	Colombo	1981	Publishing	P	A
Vesess	Technology	Software	Colombo	2004	IT	P	A
MTD Walkers PLC	Conglomerates	Engineering	Colombo	1854	General Engineering	P	A
Wijeya Newspapers	Consumer services	Publishing	Colombo	1979	Publishing	P	A
WSO2	Technology	Software	Colombo	2004	IT	P	A

== See also ==
- Economy of Sri Lanka
- List of government owned companies in Sri Lanka
- List of statutory boards of Sri Lanka
