= Piyavi Wijewardene =

Sri Lankan researcher, lecturer and author

Upul Piyavi Wijewardene
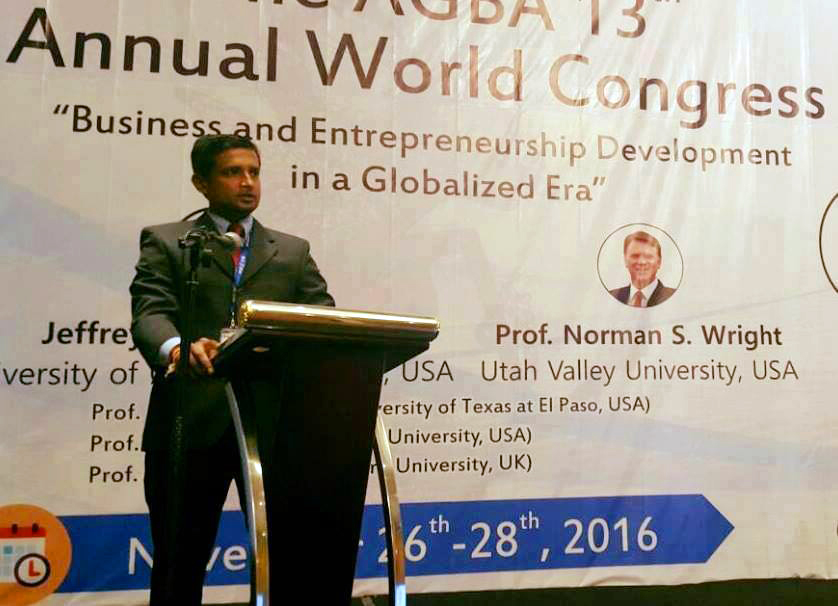
- Piyavi Wijewardene at Annual World Congress for Global Business Advancement
- Born: Upul Piyavi Wijewardene; 7 November 1982 (age 43); Colombo, Sri Lanka
- Occupations: 1. Representative - Shadow Cabinet CIVIC; 2. Representative - People's Parliament Sri Lanka; 3. Former Vice President/CEO - Odilia Group; 4. Former Director Quality Assurance - KIU Sri Lanka; 5. Former Examiner - Sri Lanka Institute of Development Administration; 6. Former Head of Academics - Management and Science University

Piyavi Wijewardene (Upul Piyavi Wijewardene) (born 7 November 1982) is a Sri Lankan researcher, lecturer, coacher and author. He serves as a representative of the Shadow Cabinet CIVIC, a non-partisan civic body, and of the People's Parliament civil initiative, both of which seek to encourage citizen participation, democratic accountability, and policy dialogue in Sri Lanka. He is the former vice president and chief executive officer of the Odiliya Group. In addition he served as the director quality assurance at KIU Sri Lanka. He is the former director of Institute of Human Capital Development and one of the former examiners at Sri Lanka Institute of Development Administration. He was a member of the Academy for Global Business Advancement and the former chapter president, Sri Lanka at the International Management Research and Technology Consortium. He served as the head of academics at the Management and Science University. He was instead worked as an executive officer at the Capital Maharaja Organization.

Piyavi attended the 13th World Congress 2016 as his doctoral research was selected by the AGBA, United States under the category of higher education. Piyavi Wijewardene delivered a special speech on the enhancement of environmental awareness at the International Forestry and Environment Symposium 2015. His joint research with co-author Dinesh Abeywickrama on Green Banking was awarded at the International Multidisciplinary Research Conference 2016.

== Early life and education ==
Born to a middle-class family in Colombo he received his initial school education at D. B Jayathilaka Vidyalaya, Colombo 10, before being admitted to Ananda College, Colombo. His father, Piyadasa Wijewardene, was a senior assessor, while his mother Vinitha Wijewardene was a government clerk. He is a degree holder from the University of Peradeniya, holds a Master's in Business Studies from the University of Colombo. Then he received his Ph.D. in Business Management from Graduate School of Management, Management and Science University, Malaysia.

== People’s Parliament and the Civic Shadow Cabinet ==
Piyavi Wijewardene is known for supporting the adaptation of the People's Parliament and the Civic Shadow Cabinet concept in Sri Lanka as a civic initiative aimed at encouraging public political engagement and policy dialogue. His efforts focused on introducing the model in a non-partisan, citizen-led format, distinct from party politics. While Piyavi promoted this idea as a grassroots platform for democratic accountability, a formal version of a Shadow Cabinet was also briefly supported by then Prime Minister Ranil Wickremesinghe, who in 2018 proposed an official shadow cabinet within the United National Party (UNP) to enhance parliamentary opposition functions.

== Ocean policy and EEZ advocacy ==
Piyavi Wijewardene, through the Shadow Cabinet CIVIC initiative, advocated for greater national focus on Sri Lanka's Exclusive Economic Zone (EEZ). He emphasized that the EEZ, which spans approximately 517,000 km^{2}, over eight times the size of the country's landmass, represents a significant but underutilized resource base. In this context, he highlighted the potential of the oceanic domain for sustainable economic growth, environmental protection, and long-term national security, while calling on the Government to adopt policies that better integrate oceanic resources and marine ecosystems into development planning.

== National media policy ==
In March 2019, he co-founded a social movement with the help of several mainstream academics and professionals to urge Sri Lankan media channels to strengthen their development orientation in prime-time news bulletins. Soon after many in the sector criticized him stating that he is countering media channels due to personal grudges. Despite criticisms, he played a leading role in developing a national media policy for a draft act aimed at emphasizing that the broadcasters will be required to make informative components about the economy, technology, arts, and culture in prime time news bulletins. Further, his media policy has aimed towards, regulation of crime reports, training media on the scientific usage of airtime, tax concessions for media channels, insurance for reporting correspondents, minimum wage for workers, monitory board for survey reports and advertising regulatory indexes. In August 2020 he was awarded a "Distinguished Service Award" by Centre of Executive Professional Development of London, for his pioneering role in setting out the plan for the national media policy in Sri Lanka.

== National food safety ==
As a researcher and advocate, Piyavi has developed key criteria for evaluating food safety practices in both formal and informal food sectors. He has contributed insights into how social behaviors, cultural norms, and knowledge dissemination impact food safety outcomes. His interdisciplinary approach combines social science research with public health and policy analysis. Recognizing that consumer knowledge and awareness are critical safety factors, Piyavi has led initiatives to improve risk communication and promote safe food handling practices across various communities. He is also involved in policy advisory roles, supporting government and non-governmental organizations in developing more inclusive and effective food safety strategies.

== Fostering entrepreneurship and enhancing educational outcomes ==
In late 2024, he led a movement focused on empowering women entrepreneurs and raising awareness about the significant impact of women's entrepreneurship on the development of the Sri Lankan economy. Additionally, he was deeply involved in a welfare project dedicated to educating school children, aiming to enhance their practical literacy. This initiative sought to equip students with essential skills to achieve better outcomes, particularly in managing stress effectively.

== System change ==
A colleague and collaborator of the vice chancellor of University of Colombo H. D. Karunaratne, the pair researched jointly for several years as influential proponents of Sri Lankan Free Trade Agreements and Custom Unions. Piyavi has written several contentious articles on both natural science and social science-related topics. His reveals on several government budgets been criticized by officials saying that he has created unnecessary fear on certain foreign trade agreements. His press reviews on Easter Sunday attacks in Sri Lanka was criticized stating that he was being pessimistic towards certain economic predictions. A BBC interview of him about the cancellation of cabinet meeting received many other disagreements pointing out that the relevance that he has made in between the relationship of cabinet meeting cancellation and country's economy is irrelevant. Several parties have claimed a strong national bias in his socio-economic opinions and stated that the materials released by many news reports "never seems able to state anything damaging to the interests of the Protectionists". He stated press that he is neither rebellious nor acquiescent, but believe that consistent focus on priorities could lead to economical development of the nation.

== Early retirement and continued contributions ==
Piyavi retired from his professional career in his early forties, choosing to step away from the conventional workforce earlier than most. Rather than settling into a quiet retirement, he redirected his time and energy toward community development, education, and social research. Embracing his role as an educationist and social scientist, Piyavi became an active voice in both local and international media, where his thought-provoking perspectives on social issues gained widespread recognition. His ability to approach topics from unconventional angles and articulate complex ideas with clarity earned him a dedicated following.

== Late blooming in sports and wellness ==
In addition to his academic and social contributions, Piyavi maintained a strong personal interest in sports. Regular participation in athletic activities not only supported his physical well-being but also played a key role in sustaining mental clarity and a sense of routine during his post-career life. This balance between intellectual engagement and physical activity helped him adapt smoothly to retirement and stay actively involved in both personal and professional spheres. His commitment to lifelong learning and holistic well-being continues to inspire others seeking purpose beyond their primary careers.

== Honors and awards ==
- "Distinguished Service Award" for his pioneering role in setting out a plan for a national media policy in Sri Lanka, By Centre of Executive Professional Development of London, 2020
- The Odiliya Group has been honored with the prestigious title of "Most Resilient Company in the Real Estate Sector", at the International Business Icon Awards 2023
- Outstanding Leadership Excellence Award 2025, at the President's Awards 2025
