= Ceylon tea =

Tea brand from Sri Lanka

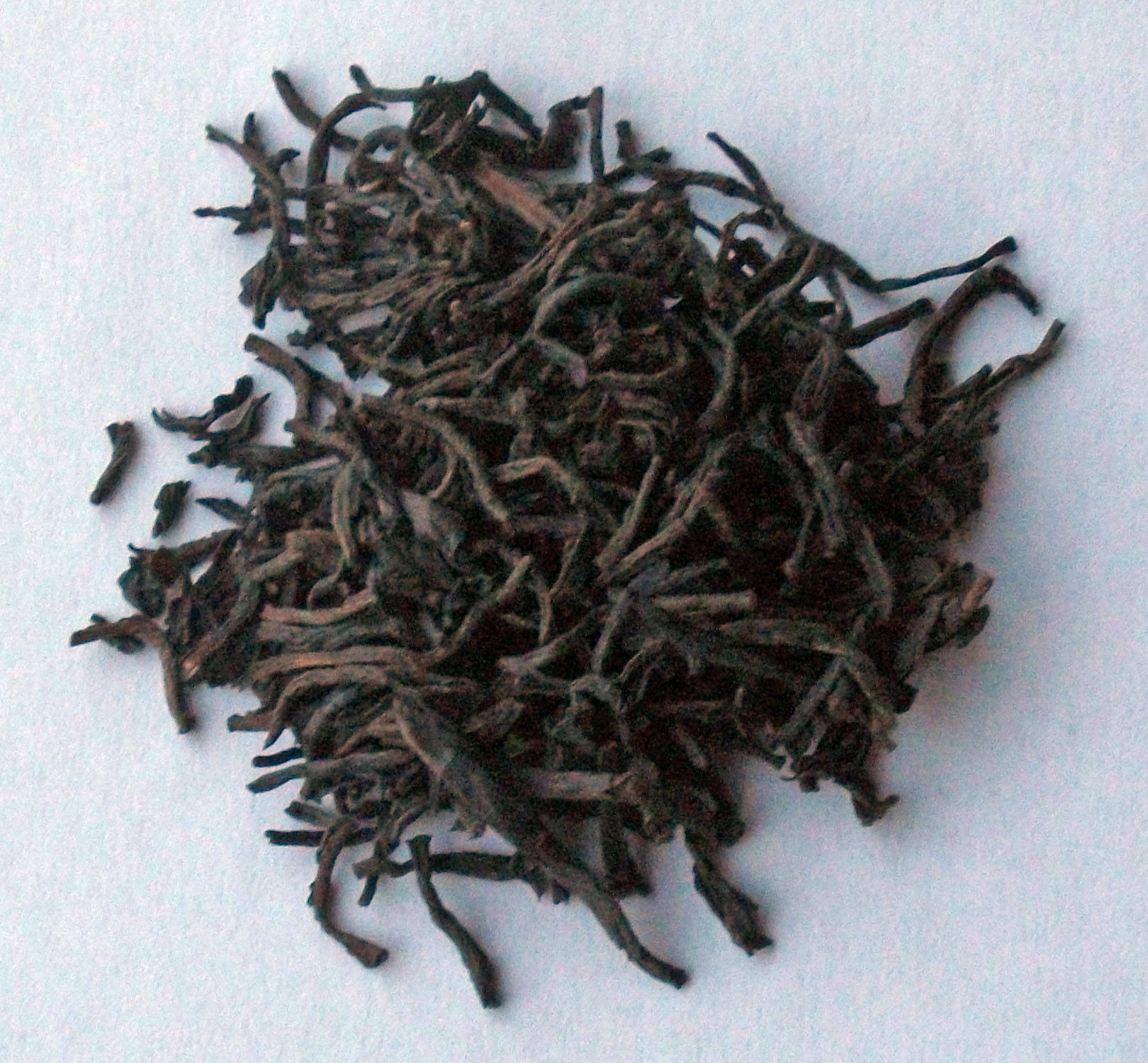
- Ceylon tea leaves
- Product type: Tea
- Current owner: Sri Lanka Tea Board
- Country: Sri Lanka
- Introduced: 1867
- Markets: Worldwide
- Previous owners: Tea Propaganda Board
- Tagline: Ceylon tea Symbol of quality
- Website: pureceylontea.com

Ceylon tea is both the brand of tea which is produced in Sri Lanka and a historic term describing black tea from that land. Ceylon tea has been described as not only a geographical descriptor but also a pillar of Sri Lankan culture, heritage, and identity. The Sri Lanka Tea Board is the legal proprietor of the Lion Logo of Ceylon tea. In 2019, Sri Lanka was the fourth largest tea producer and the third largest tea exporter in the world. The Lion Logo has been registered in 98 countries as of 2016. Ceylon tea increasingly faces rising production costs, mainly due to increasing wages, fuel prices, and utility costs.

== Lion Logo ==
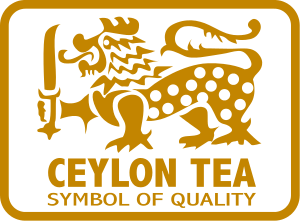
Ceylon tea logo

The Lion Logo of Ceylon tea is a logo used on a tea pack to label the authenticity of the tea. In order for the Lion Logo to appear on a tea pack, it must meet four criteria. The logo should only appear on a consumer pack, the pack should contain 100 percent pure Ceylon tea, it should be packed in Sri Lanka, and the brand should conform to the quality standards set out by the Sri Lanka Tea Board. Ceylon tea is a recognised tea because of its controlled production and should be sold in its value-refined form in order to yield higher margins. It has been suggested that restricting the usage of the logo only to licensed companies would ensure the quality of the tea and capture the interest of more customers who appreciate a certified quality product.

== Market and competition ==
The market for pure teas such as "pure Ceylon tea" is considered a niche market, occupying only 10 percent of the global market. Data analysis reveals that Sri Lanka's market share has been decreasing continuously, whereas the share of Kenyan tea has been increasing at a higher rate, penetrating into Sri Lanka's market share.

More than 50 percent of the tea exports of Sri Lanka are still in the traditional bulk tea while the value-added tea (green tea, flavoured tea, organic tea, instant tea, iced tea, and ready-to-drink tea) exports account for 40 to 45 percent of total tea exports. However all types of value-added tea products yield a higher price than the bulk tea exports. The global consumer preferences for tea are changing, therefore more convenient tea products meet a growing demand in the global market. Even though the Sri Lankan tea industry has a competitive advantage, it finds difficulties in capitalising on the advantage owing to the inability of engaging in international marketing activities.

== Sponsorships ==
Sri Lanka Tea Board signed an agreement with Sri Lanka Cricket to sponsor the Sri Lanka national cricket team and the Sri Lanka women's national cricket team commencing from June 2013, and Ceylon tea is still sponsoring the national teams.
