= Dankotuwa Porcelain =

Sri Lankan porcelain tableware manufacturer

Dankotuwa Porcelain PLC
- Logo of Dankotuwa Porcelain PLC
- Company type: Public
- Traded as: CSE: DPL.N0000
- ISIN: LK0235N00008
- Industry: Porcelain
- Founded: 1984; 42 years ago
- Headquarters: Dankotuwa, Sri Lanka
- Key people: Yudy Kanagasabai (Chairman); Channa Gunawardana (CEO)
- Revenue: ▲LKR5.913 billion (2023)
- Operating income: ▲LKR1.168 billion (2023)
- Net income: ▲LKR679 million (2023)
- Total assets: ▲LKR6.134 billion (2023)
- Total equity: ▲LKR3.255 billion (2023)
- Number of employees: 1,500 (2023)
- Parent: Ceyline Investments (68.19%)
- Subsidiaries: Royal Fernwood Porcelain Limited (95.69%); DPL Singapore Pte Ltd (100%)
- Website: www.dankotuwa.com

Dankotuwa Porcelain PLC is a porcelain tableware manufacturing company based in Dankotuwa, Sri Lanka. Dankotuwa Porcelain was incorporated in 1984 as a subsidiary of Ceylon Ceramics Corporation. Dankotuwa Porcelain was one of the four public enterprises that were privatised in December 1990. The company was converted to a public company in 1994 and listed on the Colombo Stock Exchange later in the same year. Environmental Resources Investment (currently known as Ambeon Holdings) acquired the company in 2010 for a consideration of LKR433 million. Dankotuwa Porcelain acquired Royal Fernwood Porcelain from Browns Group in December 2013 for LKR305 million.

Export sales of the company make up 83% of total sales. The company took part in the International Labour Organization's social dialogue programme of work teams. Dankotuwa Porcelain ranked 38th in LMD 100 second board in its 2021/22 edition. In 2021, Dankotowa Porcelain was adjudged as the most loved homeware brand in Sri Lanka by Brand Finance. Ceyline Investments acquired 50.1% of the stake of the company in July 2023 for a consideration of LKR2.3 billion. Subsequently, Ceyline Investments increased its stake to 68.19% through the mandatory offer.

== History ==
Dankotuwa Porcelain was incorporated on 6 January 1984 as a subsidiary of Ceylon Ceramics Corporation. General Treasury and Employees' Trust Fund were the company's other shareholders. The company was one of the four public enterprises that were privatised in December 1990. The investors were a consortium of Japanese companies. The investing company had no experience in porcelain making. As a result, after several years, the investing company did not implement its expansion plans. Dankotuwa Porcelain was converted to a public company in 1994 and listed on the Colombo Stock Exchange later in the year. Dankotuwa Porcelain received an order from The Walt Disney Company to manufacture a special commemorative plate to mark the 100th birthday anniversary of Walt Disney in 2001.

Environmental Resources Investment (today known as Ambeon Holdings) and its subsidiary, Ceylon Leather Products, acquired Dankotuwa Porcelain in 2010 for LKR433 million. The new consortium gained control of 66.67% of the shares at a price of LKR9 per share. The company changed its manufacturing method by adopting building up inventory instead of manufacturing to orders to reduce the delivery time. Dankotuwa Porcelain opened its flagship store in Union Place in 2012. Dankotuwa Porcelain acquired Royal Fernwood Porcelain Ltd in December 2013 for LKR305 million. The acquisition gave Dankotuwa Porcelain control of 76% of Royal Fernwood Porcelain shares, a subsidiary of Browns Group. The company reintroduced Laklain, its legacy brand, to the Sri Lankan market in 2018. Laklain was the first brand introduced by the company in the early 2000s and is known for its floral designs.

== Operations ==
Dankotuwa Porcelain's export sales make up 83% of the total sales. The company took part in the International Labour Organization's social dialogue programme of work teams. The company is ranked 38th in LMD 100's second board for the financial year 2021/22. LMD 100 is an annual list of public companies in Sri Lanka by revenue compiled by the business magazine LMD. Dankotuwa Porcelain was ranked among the 100 most valuable brands in Sri Lanka by Brand Finance in 2018. Brand Finance estimated the brand value of Dankotuwa Porcelain to be LKR153 million. In 2021, the company was adjudged as the most loved homeware brand in Sri Lanka by Brand Finance. Dankotuwa Porcelain won the gold award at the 2020 NCE Export Awards in large-scale manufacturing in the porcelain and ceramics sector. The NCE Export Awards is organised by the National Chamber of Exporters of Sri Lanka. Ceyline Investments, a fully owned subsidiary of Ceyline Holdings, acquired 50.1% of the stake of Dankotuwa Porcelain for LKR2.3 billion in July 2023. Ceyline Holdings is a company engaged in the shipping logistics sector. subsequently, Ceyline Investments increased its stake to 68.19% through mandatory offer. However, the offer did not include the 22.41% stake held by Ambeon Holdings.

== See also ==
- Lanka Tiles, another company that was a subsidiary of Ceylon Ceramics Corporation subsequently privatised
- List of companies listed on the Colombo Stock Exchange
