= Country Style Foods =

Country Style Foods may refer to:

- Country Style Foods Limited (UK), a bakery company in the United Kingdom
- Country Style Foods Private Limited, a producer of beverages, fruit juices, fruit preserves, snacks, and dairy products in Sri Lanka
