= H. D. Karunaratne =

Sri Lankan business economist, academic, author and administrator

Senior Professor H. D. Karunaratne
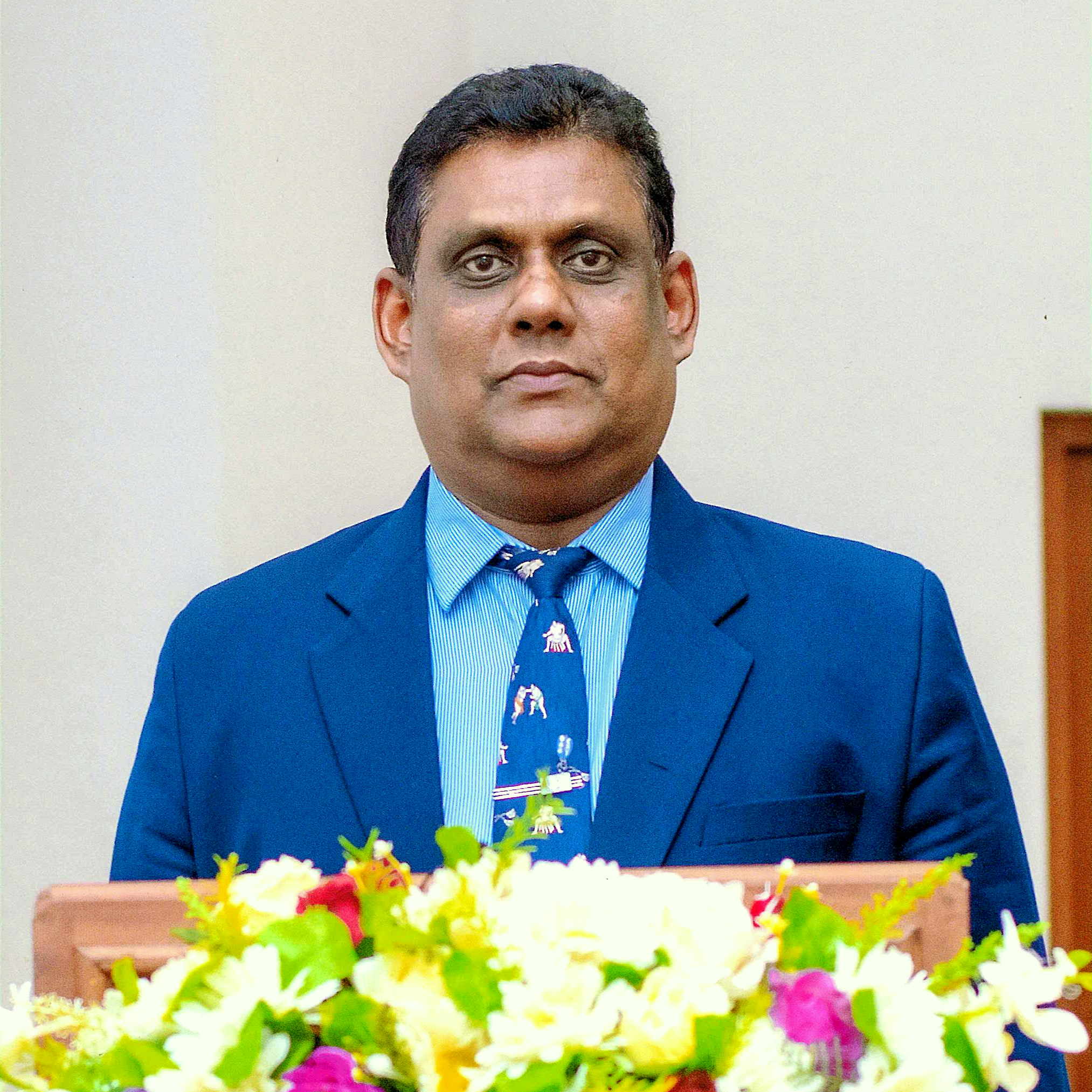
- Born: Hettige Don Karunaratne; December 11, 1964 (age 61); Colombo, Sri Lanka
- Occupations: Former Vice-Chancellor of the University of Colombo. Invited Professor, Tokyo College, The University of Tokyo. Former Chairman of the Institute of Policy Studies, Sri Lanka. Former Vice President of Sri Lanka Economic Association. A Recipient of Foreign Minister's Commendation of the Government of Japan; Former Director, Institute of Human Resource Advancement. Founding Coordinator, Doctor of Business Administration (DBA) Program, University of Colombo. Senior Professor & Former Head of the Department of Business Economics, Faculty of Management and Finance, University of Colombo. Former Dean, Faculty of Management and Finance, University of Colombo (2011 - 2014). Invited Professor, Faculty of Economics, Hosei University, Tokyo, Japan (2006 - 2008). Former Director of the University of Tokyo Sri Lanka office(2019 - Present) .

Hettige Don Karunaratne (known as H. D. Karunaratne) (born December 11, 1964) is a Sri Lankan business economist, academic, author, administrator and former Vice-Chancellor of the University of Colombo. He serves as an Invited Professor at Tokyo College, The University of Tokyo, Japan. He is the former Chairman of the Institute of Policy Studies, Sri Lanka and the Former Director of Institute of Human Resource Advancement. Karunaratne is a recipient of Foreign Minister's Commendation of the Government of Japan. He is the Former Dean at the Faculty of Management and Finance, University of Colombo and the Founding Coordinator of Doctor of Business Administration (DBA) Program, University of Colombo. He is the former Vice President of Sri Lanka Economic Association and the former Director of the University of Tokyo Sri Lanka office.

== Early life and family ==
Born to a middle-class family in the suburbs of Colombo he received his initial school education at Vidyawardana Vidyalaya, Wellampitiya before being admitted to Siddhartha Central College, Wellampitiya. H. D. Karunaratne is married to Anuradha Ruwanmali Karunaratne. He has two daughters, H. D. Sakura Lakshika Karunaratne and H. D. Midori Tharuka Karunaratne.

== Career ==
Having begun as a research assistant for Wiros Lokh Institute at Thimbirigasyaya, he was appointed Dean of the Faculty of Management and Finance, University of Colombo, Sri Lanka from 2011 to 2014. Prior to the appointment, H. D. Karunaratne was the Invited Professor at the Faculty of Economics, Hosei University, Tokyo, Japan from April 2006 to March 2008. And also he worked as the Founder and Chief Editor of the Colombo Business Journal Published by the Faculty of Management and Finance, University of Colombo.

He was Acting Dean, Acting Director of Studies and the Coordinator for MBA, MBS, MDS and PGDBM programmes of the Faculty of Graduate Studies, University of Colombo (FGS – UOC) in various years during the period from 2000 to 2015. He has served as a Member to the Board of Study for Development Studies (BSDS) and Board of Study for Professional Studies (BSPS) of the same faculty. He also has served as Acting Director to Institute of Human Resource Advancement (IHRA) of University of Colombo (from January to May in 2015). He has served as a Member to the Board of Study for Human Resource Management and Academic Syndicate of the Institute in various years. He worked as a Member to the Standing committee on Management Studies at the University Grant Commission of Sri Lanka (UGC) from 2011 to 2015. He served as the Member to the Governing Council of the National Centre for Advancement of Social Science (NCAS), UGC of Sri Lanka from 2010 to 2014.

H. D. Karunaratne was the Elected External Member to The Board of Faculty of Humanities and Social Sciences, at the Open University of Sri Lanka from 2010 to 2014. He also works as a Member of the Faculty Board at the Faculty of Graduate Studies, General Sir John Kotelawala Defence University, Ratmalana. H. D. Karunaratne became the President of The Japanese Graduates' Alumni Association of Sri Lanka (JAGAAS) in 2014. He was the Secretary to the same association from 2010 to 2013. He is the Vice President of Sri Lanka Economic Association since October 2014 and he was the editor for Sri Lanka Economic journal published by the same association from 2010 to 2013.

== Tenure as a dean ==
H. D. Karunaratne introduced two new academic disciplines to the Faculty of Management and Finance, University of Colombo as Business Economics and International Business. He was the Founder Head of Business Economics Unit which was established at the faculty in 2003 and instrumental to introduce a four-year bachelor's degree program as Bachelor of Business Administration in Business Economics in 2007. After returning from the Invited Professorship in Hosei University Tokyo, in 2008, he introduced a four-year bachelor's degree program named BBA in International Business, by accomplishing University of Colombo as the first Sri Lankan state-own university to offer the program. Subsequently, under his Deanship, he was instrumental to establish the MBA Degree program in International Business. H. D. Karunaratne is the founder of the Department of International Business in the University of Colombo in 2014.

He introduced the Career Fair concept to the Faculty of Management and Finance, University of Colombo and subsequently established the Career Guidance Unit in the faculty.

== Relations with Japan ==
H.D. Karunaratne is a recipient of Foreign Minister's Commendation of the Government of Japan. He received the Japanese Government Postgraduate Research (MONBUKAGAKUSHO) Scholarship to pursue his higher studies in Yokohama National University, Hitotsubashi University, Nagoya City University and Nagoya University from 1993 to 2000. Subsequently, he joined Japanese Graduates' Alumni Association of Sri Lanka (JAGAAS) in 2000 and became an executive committee member in the same year. He was elected as the Editor of the newsletter published by JAGAAS in 2004. He served as Assistant Secretary and Vice President and Secretary to JAGAAS, before being elected as the President of the Association in 2014 and for the second time in 2018. He was an Invited Professor at the Faculty of Economics, Hosei University, Tokyo, Japan from April 2006 to March 2008.

With the influential connections that he had with Japanese professionals and academics, H. D. Karunaratne accompanied a group of Japanese Students with Professor Esho Hideki to Gyeongsang National University, Busan, Korea in 2006. In the following years with the initiative of H. D. Karunaratne, Japanese professors, professionals and students were invited to the University of Colombo to conduct the Joint International Undergraduate Student Exchange Seminar in 2007,2012 and 2015.

H. D. Karunaratne wrote many books using the exposure and insight he gained over the years in Japan, titled, A Journey in Harmony: Sixty Years of Japan-Sri Lanka Relations (2012), Internationalization of Sri Lankan Entrepreneurship: A Study of Sri Lankan Immigrant Entrepreneurs in Japan (2009) and Distant Neighbors at Work Place: A Study of Sri Lankan Migrant Workers in Japan (2007). H. D. Karunaratne has been a member of Japan Society of International Development, Graduate School of International Development, Nogoya University Alumni Association, and East Asian Economic Association. And also he has been functioning as a member of South Asian Federation of Japanese Graduates’ Alumni Association.

== Education ==
Earning a Special Degree in Bachelor of Arts (Economics) with a First Class Honors in 1990, H. D. Karunaratne was awarded two master's degrees in Economics in 1992 and 1997 from University of Colombo, Sri Lanka and Nagoya City University, Japan. Then he received his Ph.D. in Economics from Graduate School of International Development (GSID), Nagoya University, Nagoya, Japan, 2000.

== Honours and awards ==
H. D. Karunaratne received a Japanese Government Postgraduate Research, (MONBUKAGAKUSHO) Scholarship to pursue his Masters and Doctoral research degrees in Japan, from April 1993 to February 2000. He was bestowed a gold medal for the Best Researcher in the Faculty of Management Finance, University of Colombo at the Annual Postgraduate Convocation of the University of Colombo held at Bandaranaike Memorial International Conference Hall (BMICH) in 2002. He was appointed as an Invited Professor at the Faculty of Economics in Hosei University, Tokyo, Japan from April 2006 to March 2008 and April 2017 to March 2018. Karunaratne received the Japan Foundation Fellowship in 2016-2017 at the Institute for Advanced Studies on Asia at the University of Tokyo and Long Service (25 Years’) Award at the University of Colombo in year 2017.

== Books ==
- A Journey in Harmony: Sixty Years of Japan-Sri Lanka Relations (2012)
- Internationalization of Sri Lankan Entrepreneurship: A Study of Sri Lankan Immigrant Entrepreneurs in Japan (2009)
- Snapshot of a Transformation: Mahinda Chinthana, 2005-2008 (2009)
- Distant Neighbors at Work Place: A Study of Sri Lankan Migrant Workers in Japan (2007)
- Introductory Macroeconomics-in Sinhala: ISBN 978-955-50475-3-1, Neographics, Nugogoda, Sri Lanka
- Applied Economics-in Sinhala: ISBN 978-955-50475-2-4, Neographics, Nugogoda, Sri Lanka

== Journal articles ==
=== Research articles published in refereed journals ===
- Herath, H. M. T. S.; Karunaratna, H. D. (2018). "The Role of Market Orientation in the Performance of Born Global Firms: A Multi-dimensional Construct Approach". Journal for International Business and Entrepreneurship Development. 11 (4): 285. doi:10.1504/JIBED.2018.098711.
- Herath, H. M. T. S.; Karunaratna, H. D. (2017). "Entrepreneurial Orientation of Information and Communication Technology Services Export in Sri Lanka". Journal of Business and Economics. 8.
- Karunaratna, H. D. (2017). "In Search of the Silver Line from Immigrant Entrepreneurs in Japan". Journal of Business and Technology. 2.
- Mudunkotuwa, R.; Karunaratna, H. D. (2017). "An Empirical Investigation of Macroeconomic Determinants of Tourist Arrivals to Sri Lanka". International Journal of Current Research. 9.
- Wijewardena, A. G. C. S.; Karunaratna, H. D. (2017). "Cricket as an International Business: What can Sri Lanka Learn from Indian Primer League (IPL)". International Journal of Commerce, Business and Management. 6.
- Senadheera, G. D. V. R.; Karunaratna, H. D. (2016). "Values and Diversity of Organizational Work Ethicality: Lessons Learnt from Sri Lankan Entrepreneurs". Vidyodaya Journal of Management. 2 (2). doi:10.31357/vjm.v2i2.3644.
- Senadheera, G. D. V. R.; Karunaratna, H. D. (2016). "Perception of Ethical Climate as against Entrepreneurial Values: Perspectives of Sri Lankan Entrepreneurs". Australasian Journal of Law Ethics and Governance. 2.
- Wijewardene, U. P.; Karunaratne, H. D. (2016). "The Impact of ISFTA on Exporters in Sri Lanka". Icmr 2016.
- Wijewardene, U. P.; Karunaratne, H. D. (2016). "Review of Literature on the Impact of FTA on Exporters in Developing Countries. Special Reference to Sri Lanka". Interdisciplinary Conference of Management Researchers.
- Senadheera, G. D. V. R.; Karunaratna, H. D. (2014). "Understanding Contextual Realities of Entrepreneurial Values and Ethical Ideologies: Lessons from Sri Lankan Entrepreneurs". Colombo Journal of Multi-disciplinary Research. 1.
- Senadheera, G. D. V. R.; Gamage, H. R.; Karunaratna, H. D. (2014). "Value Driven Asiatic Entrepreneurship: South Asian Way of Ethical Entrepreneurship and Sustainability". International Journal of Process Management and Benchmarking.
- Senadheera, G. D. V. R.; Karunaratne, H. D. (2014). "Understanding Contextual Realities of Entrepreneurial Values and Ethical Ideologies: Lessons from Sri Lankan Entrepreneurs". Colombo Journal of Multi-disciplinary Research.
- Karunaratne, H. D. (2010). "Sri Lankan Migrant Workers in Japan: Macroeconomic Implications for Sri Lanka". Sri Lanka Economic Journal.
- Karunaratne, H. D. (2009). "Ethnic Resource Utilization of Sri Lankan Immigrant Entrepreneurs in Japan". Sri Lanka Economic Journal. Archived from the original on 2015-10-06.
- Karunaratne, H. D. (2009). "A Profile of Sri Lankan Immigrant Entrepreneurships in Japan". University of Colombo Review. OCLC 775856947.
- Karunaratne, H. D. (2008). "International Labour Migration, Remittances and Income Inequality in a Developing Country : The Case of Sri Lanka". KEIZAI-SHIRIN (Hosei Economic Review).
- Karunaratne, H. D. (2007). "Managing Regional Income Inequality in Sri Lanka: Lessons from Japanese Experience". Journal of International Economic Studies.
- Karunaratne, H. D. (2007). "An Inquiry into the Regional Disparity in Per Capita Income and labour Productivity: A Case of Sri Lanka". Forum of International Development Studies. Archived from the original on 2015-10-06.
- Karunaratne, H. D. (2007c). "Growth and Structural Changes of Foreign Workers in Japan: Economic Implications for Sri Lanka". KEIZAI-SHIRIN (Hosei Economic Review).
- Karunaratne, H. D. (2007b). "Trade Liberalization and Wage Inequality: The Case of Sri Lanka". KEIZAI-SHIRIN (Hosei Economic Review). Archived from the original on 2016-03-17.
- Karunaratne, H. D. (2007a). "Structural Change and the State of the Labour Market in Sri Lanka". KEIZAI-SHIRIN (Hosei Economic Review).
- Karunaratne, H. D. (2006). "Impact of Industrial Structural Changes on Income Inequality Trends in Sri Lanka". University of Colombo Review. Archived from the original on 2015-10-06.
- Karunaratne, H. D. (2003). "Globalization, Service Sector Expansion and Income Inequality in Sri Lanka". Sri Lanka Journal of Social Sciences. Archived from the original on 2015-10-06.
- Karunaratne, H. D. (2001a). "An Analysis on Long-term Income Inequality Trends in Sri Lanka". Sri Lanka Economic Journal.
- Karunaratne, H. D. (2001b). "Post-war Economic Miracle in Japan: lessons for Sri Lanka". IWE Journal. 3.
- Karunaratne, H. D. (2000a). "An Analysis of Types of Income and Inequality in Sri Lanka". IWE Journal. 2.
- Karunaratne, H. D. (2000). "Age as a Factor Determining Income Inequality in Sri Lanka". The Developing Economies. 38 (2): 211–242. doi:10.1111/j.1746-1049.2000.tb00877.x.
- Karunaratne, H. D. (2000). "Income Inequality among sub-groups of population at the Sectoral Level in Sri Lanka, 1963-1997: A Decomposition Analysis" (PDF). Forum of International Development Studies.
- Karunaratne, H. D. (2000). "Income Distribution in Rural Sri Lanka 1963-1997". The Economic Science.
- Karunaratne, H. D. (1999). "Sectoral Diversity of Income Inequality in Sri Lanka: A Disaggregated Analysis by Factor Incomes", Regional Development Studies". Annual Journal of the United Nations Center for Regional Development.
- Karunaratne, H. D. (1998). "Income Inequality in Sri Lanka: A Disaggregated Analysis by Factor Incomes" (PDF). Forum of International Development Studies.
