= List of government-owned companies of Sri Lanka =

This is a list of companies owned by the central government of Sri Lanka.

== Commercial corporations ==
- Agricultural Insurance Board
- Bank of Ceylon
- Central Bank of Sri Lanka
- Central Engineering Consultancy Bureau
- Ceylon Ceramics Corporation
- Ceylon Electricity Board
- Ceylon Fisheries Corporation
- Ceylon Hotels Corporation
- Ceylon Petroleum Corporation
- Co-operative Wholesale Establishment
- Development Lotteries Board
- Employees Trust Fund Board
- Housing Development Finance Corporation of Sri Lanka
- Janatha Estates Development Board
- Lady Lohore Loan Fund
- Local Loans & Development Fund
- National Film Corporation of Sri Lanka
- National Institute of Business Management
- National Livestock Development Board
- National Lotteries Board
- National Savings Bank
- National Water Supply and Drainage Board
- People's Bank
- Sri Lanka Ayurvedic Drugs Corporation
- Sri Lanka Broadcasting Corporation
- Sri Lanka Bureau of Foreign Employment
- Sri Lanka Cashew Corporation
- Sri Lanka Cement Corporation
- Sri Lanka Export Credit Insurance Corporation
- Sri Lanka Handicrafts Board
- Sri Lanka Land Reclamation & Development Corporation
- Sri Lanka Ports Authority
- Sri Lanka Railway Authority
- Sri Lanka Rubber Manufacturing Export Co. Ltd
- Sri Lanka Rupavahini Corporation
- Sri Lanka State Plantations Corporation
- Sri Lanka Transport Board
- State Development & Construction Corporation
- State Engineering Corporation of Sri Lanka
- State Mortgage & Investment Bank
- State Pharmaceuticals Corporation of Sri Lanka
- State Pharmaceuticals Manufacturing Corporation
- State Printing Corporation
- State Timber Corporation
- Urban Development Authority

== Government owned companies ==
- Airport and Aviation Services (Sri Lanka) Limited
- The Associated Newspapers of Ceylon Ltd
- B.C.C. Lanka Ltd
- B.O.C. Bank
- CTB BUS
- Lynx BUS
- Building Materials Corporation Ltd
- Ceylon Fertilizer Company Ltd
- Ceylon Shipping Corporation Ltd
- Cey-Nor Foundation Ltd
- Colombo Sack Makers Ltd
- Independent Television Network Ltd
- Kalubovitiyana Tea Factory Ltd
- Lanka Fabrics Ltd
- Lanka Mineral Sands Ltd
- Lanka Phosphate Ltd
- Lanka Salusala Ltd
- Lanka Sathosa Ltd
- Mantai Salt Ltd
- Milk Industries of Lanka (Pvt) Ltd (MILCO)
- National Equipment & Machinery Organization
- National Paper Co. Ltd
- North Sea Ltd
- Paranthan Chemicals Co. Ltd
- Private Sector Infrastructure Development Company
- Skill Development Fund Ltd
- Sri Lanka Rubber Manufacturing Export Co. Ltd
- STC General Trading Company Ltd
- Thamankaduwa Agro Fertilizer Co. Ltd

== Other institutions ==
=== Plantations ===
- Agalawatta Plantations Ltd
- Agarapatana Plantations Ltd
- Balangoda Plantations Ltd
- Bogawantalawa Plantations Ltd
- Chilaw Plantations Ltd
- Hapugastenna Plantations Ltd
- Horana Plantations Ltd
- Kahawatte Plantations Ltd
- Kegalle Plantations Ltd
- Kelani Velly Plantations Ltd
- Kotagala Plantations Ltd
- Kurunegala Plantations Ltd
- Maskeliya Plantations Ltd
- Mathurata Plantations Ltd
- Namunukula Plantations Ltd
- Pussallawa Plantations Ltd
- Talawakelle Plantation Ltd
- Uda Pussellawa Plantations Ltd

=== Other ===
- Alexandria International (Pvt) Ltd
- Acland Insurance Services Ltd
- Air Ceylon Ltd
- Asbestos Cement Industries Ltd
- Asian Hotels Corporation Ltd
- BOC Management & Support Services (Pvt) Ltd
- BOC Property Development & Management (Pvt) Ltd
- BOC Travels (Pvt) Ltd
- Bogala Graphite Lanka Ltd
- Borwood Ltd
- Building Material Manufacturing Corporation
- Capital Development & Investment Company
- CDIC Fund 2 Ltd
- CEATO
- Ceylease Financial Services Ltd
- Ceylon Agro Industries Ltd
- Ceylon Glass Co. Ltd
- Ceylon Leather Products Ltd
- Ceylon Manufactures& Merchants Ltd
- Ceylon Oxygen Ltd
- Ceylon Port Services Ltd
- Ceylon Shipping Agency (Pvt) Ltd
- Ceylon Shipping Agency (Pvt) (Singapore) Ltd
- Ceylon Shipping Lines Ltd
- Ceylon Silks Ltd
- Ceylon Steel Corporation Ltd
- Colombo Commercial (Teas) Ltd
- Colombo Commercial Fertilizers Ltd
- Colombo Commercial Company (Engineers) Ltd
- Colombo Dockyard Ltd
- Colombo International School
- Colombo Metropolitan Bus Company
- Commercial Bank of Ceylon Ltd
- Consolidated Commercial Agencies
- Consolidated Export & Trading Co. Ltd
- Dairy Development Foundation
- Dankotuwa Porcelain (Pvt) Ltd
- Devco Showa (Pvt) Ltd
- Development Finance Corporation of Ceylon
- Distilleries Company of Sri Lanka Ltd
- Elephant Lite Corporation Ltd
- Elkaduwa Plantations Ltd
- Elpitiya Plantations Ltd
- Fruit Development Board
- Galadari Hotel
- Gampaha Bus Company
- Glaxo Wellcome Ceylon Ltd
- Grain and Pulses Research & Development Authority
- Hingurana Sugar Industries Ltd
- Hotel De Buhari
- Hotel Developers (Lanka) Ltd
- Hotel Services (Ceylon) Ltd
- Hotels Colombo (63) Ltd
- Hunas Falls Hotels Ltd
- International Dairy Products Ltd
- Investment Monitoring Board
- Janatha Fertilizer Co. Ltd
- Kadurata Development Bank
- Kahagolla Engineering Services Co. Ltd (KESCO)
- Kahatagaha Graphite Lanka Ltd
- Kalutara Bus Company
- Kandy Hotels Company (1938) Ltd
- Kantale Sugar Industries Ltd
- Kelani Tyres Ltd
- Land Reclamation & Development Co. Ltd
- Lanhua Fisheries Co. (Pvt) Ltd
- Lanka Archives Management Services (Pvt) Ltd
- Lanka Ashok Leyland
- Lanka Canneries Ltd
- Lanka Cement Co. Ltd
- Lanka Ceramic Ltd
- Lanka Electricity Company (Pvt) Ltd
- Lanka Hydraulic Institute Ltd
- Lanka Industrial Estates Ltd
- Lanka Leyland Ltd
- Lanka Loha Hardware Ltd
- Lanka Lubricants Ltd
- Lanka Machine Leasers Ltd
- Lanka Marine Services (Pvt) Ltd
- Lanka Milk Foods (CWE) Ltd
- Lanka Plywood Products Ltd
- Lanka Products Export Corporation (Pvt) Ltd
- Lanka Puwath Ltd
- Lanka Refractories Ltd
- Lanka Salt Ltd
- Lanka Securities (Pvt) Ltd
- Lanka Synthetic Fibre Co. Ltd
- Lanka Tankers Ltd
- Lanka Textiles & Emporium Ltd
- Lanka Tractors Ltd
- Lanka Transformers Ltd
- Lanka Walltiles (Pvt) Ltd
- Libra Industries Ltd
- Madulsima Plantations Ltd
- Mahanuwara Bus Company
- Mahaveli Venture Capital Co. (Pvt) Ltd
- Mahaweli Merine Cement Company Ltd
- Malwatte Valley Plantations Ltd
- Management Services Rakshana (Pvt) Ltd
- Mattegama Textiles Mills Ltd
- Merchant Bank of Sri Lanka Ltd
- Merchant Credit of Sri Lanka Ltd
- Mercantile Shipping Co. Ltd
- Mushroom Development and Training Center
- National Agricultural Diversification & Settlement Authority
- National Apprenticeship Board
- National Assets Management Ltd
- National Development Bank Ltd
- National Development Bank of Sri Lanka
- National Development Trust Fund
- National Insurance Corporation Ltd
- National Insurance Service
- National Milk Board
- National Packaging Center
- National Packaging Materials Corporation
- National Textiles Corporation
- New Eastern Bus Company
- Noorani Tile Works Ltd
- Northern Transport Company Ltd
- Nuwara Eliya Bus Company
- Ocean View Development (Pvt) Ltd
- Orient Lanka Ltd
- Paddy Marketing Board
- Panadura Tea and Rubber Co. Ltd
- Peliyagoda Ware House Co. Ltd
- Pelwatte Sugar Industries Ltd
- People 's Travels (Pvt) Ltd
- People's Venture Investment Company
- People's Leasing Co. (Pvt) Ltd
- People's Merchant Bank Ltd
- People's Property Development Co. (Pvt) Ltd
- Property Development Limited
- Pugoda Textiles Lanka Ltd
- Puttalam Cement Co. Ltd
- Puttalam Salt Ltd
- Rajarata Bus Company
- Rajarata Development Bank
- Rajarata Food Grain Processing Co. Ltd
- Resettlement and Rehabilitation Authority of North
- Rever Valley's Development Board
- Road Construction & Development Co. (Pvt) Ltd
- Robinson Club Bentota Ltd
- Ruhuna 2001- Venture Capital Co. (Pvt) Ltd
- Ruhunu 2001 Consultancy Services
- Ruhunu 2001 Human Resources Development & Training Co. (Pvt) Ltd
- Ruhunu 2001 Management & Secretarial Services (Pvt) Ltd
- Ruhunu Agro Fertilizer Co. Ltd
- Ruhunu Bus Company
- Ruhunu Cement Company Ltd
- Ruhunu Development Bank
- Sabaragamuwa Bus Company
- Sabaragamuwa Development Bank
- Sathosa Computer Services Ltd
- Sathosa Motors Ltd
- Sathosa Priners Ltd
- Sea Lion Express Ltd
- Self-employment Project
- Sevanagala Sugar Industries Ltd
- Shaw Industries Ltd
- Shell Gas Lanka Ltd (Colombo Gas Company Ltd)
- Small Industries Corporation
- Spices & Allied Products Marketing Board
- Sri Lanka Port Management & Consultancy Services Ltd
- Sri Lanka EDI Network Services (Pvt) Ltd
- Sri Lanka Industrial Development Co. Ltd
- Sri Lanka Institute of Co-operative Management
- Sri Lanka Insurance Corporation Ltd
- Sri Lanka Institute of Development Administration
- Sri Lanka Insurance & Robinson Hotel Company Ltd
- Sri Lanka-Libya Agricultural & Livestock Development Co. Ltd
- Sri Lanka State Trading Corporation
- Sri Lanka Sugar Co. Ltd
- Sri Lanka Telecom Ltd
- Sri Lanka Telecom Services Ltd
- Sri Lanka Tobacco Industries Corporation (Tobacco Industries Ltd)
- SriLankan Airlines
- Statcon Rubber Company Ltd
- State Fertilizer Manufacturing Corporation
- State Flour Milling Corpotion
- State Gem Corporation
- Taj Lanka Hotels Ltd
- Tea Small Holder Factories Ltd
- The Selinsing Co. Ltd
- The Unit Trust Management Co. (Pvt) Ltd
- Thomas De La Rue Lanka (Pvt) Ltd
- Thulhiriya Textiles Mills
- Times of Ceylon
- United Motors Ltd
- University Affiliated College - Buttala
- University Affiliated College - Central
- University Affiliated College - Eastern
- University Affiliated College - North Central
- University Affiliated College - North Western
- University Affiliated College - Sabaragamuwa
- University Affiliated College - Trincomalee
- University Affiliated College - Uva
- University Affiliated College - Western
- Uva Development Bank
- Uva Bus Company
- Vavunia Passenger Transport Services Ltd
- Vegetable Development Board
- Veyangoda Textile Mills Ltd
- Watapota Investments Ltd
- Wattawala Plantations Ltd
- Wayamba Agro Fertilizer Co. Ltd
- Wayamba Bus Company
- Wayamba Development Bank
- Weaving Supplies Corporation
- Wellawatta Spinning & Weaving Mills
- Werahera Engineering Services Co. Ltd (WESCO)
- Wijaya Tiles Ltd
- Youth Services (Dance Group) Ltd
- Youth Services Co. Ltd

== See also ==
- List of companies of Sri Lanka
- List of government-owned companies
- List of statutory boards of Sri Lanka
