= CBL Munchee Bangladesh =

Bangladeshi biscuit brand

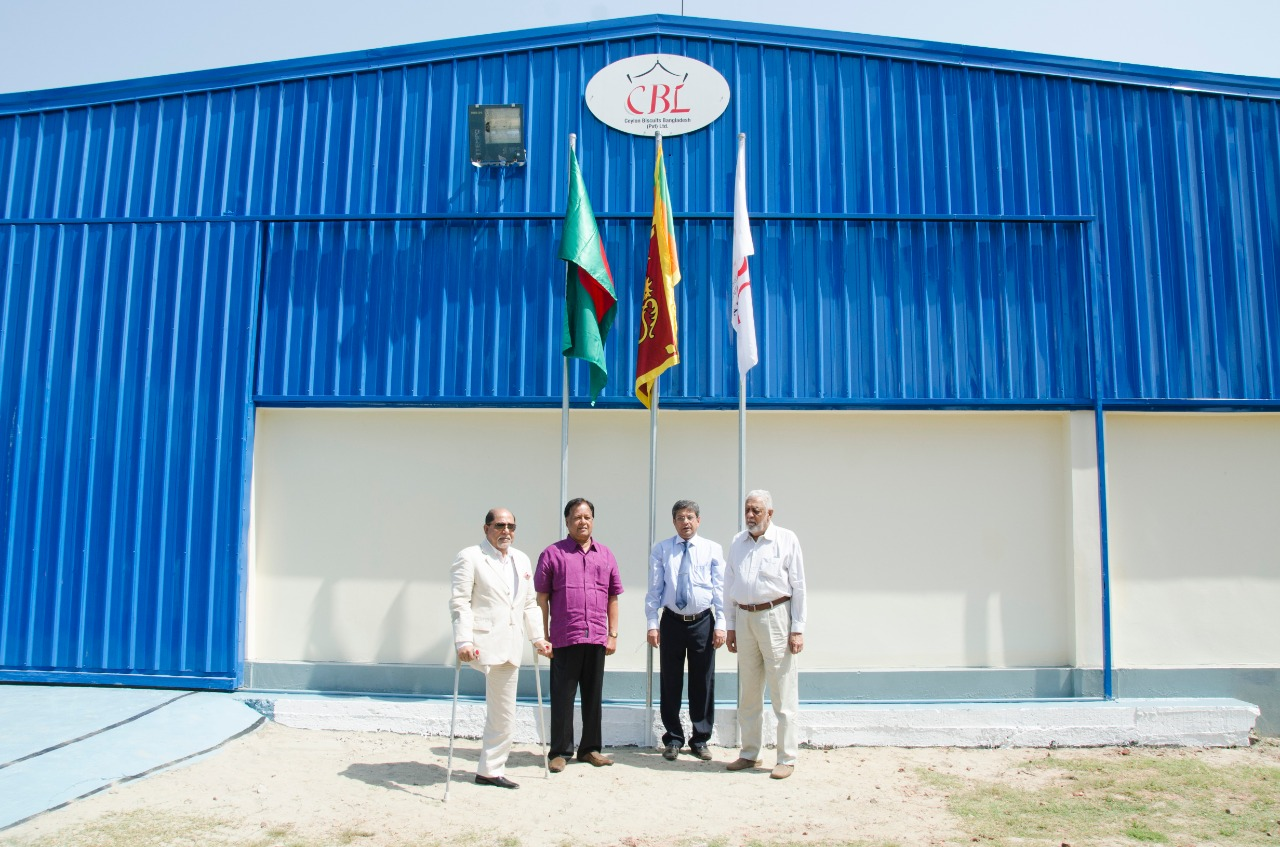
- CBL Munchee Bangladesh factory in Sreepur Upazila, Gazipur District, Bangladesh
- Product type: Confectionery
- Current owner: Ceylon Biscuits Limited
- Produced by: Ceylon Biscuits Limited Bangladesh
- Country: Bangladesh
- Introduced: 2015
- Related brands: Ringo, Premium Nice Biscuits, Milkaas, Gluco Milk, Gluco Milk, Chocolate Chips Cookies, Chocolate Wafers, Next, Choco Mo Peanut Fantasy, Chocolate Fingers, Chunky Choc, Choco Mo Regular
- Markets: 55 countries (including Bangladesh, Nepal, Bhutan, UAE)
- Tagline: King of the World of Taste (স্বাদের রাজ্যের রাজা)
- Website: www.cblmuncheebd.com

CBL Munchee Bangladesh is a flagship biscuit brand of Ceylon Biscuits Limited (CBL) in Bangladesh. CBL, the mother company with 50 years of experience and is present in 64 countries, entered Bangladesh in 2014 by setting up a factory in Sreepur Upazila, Gazipur, 35 kilometres (22 mi) from Dhaka as the first Sri Lankan owned confectionery manufacturing plant in Bangladesh, and the first Sri Lankan owned confectionery manufacturing plant overseas. The plant was set up as it was cheaper to manufacture in Bangladesh than exporting large volumes there due to high duties on confectionery imports. With the plant CBL planned to export Munchee to Nepal and Bhutan, and eventually to Europe and Persian Gulf countries from the Bangladesh plant as Bangladesh had significant concessions on its exports.

CBL Munchee started marketing in Bangladesh in 2015. By 2019, Munchee was available in 55 countries. CBL has an agreement with Concord Entertainment Co. Ltd to showcase Munchee at Fantasy Kingdom.

== Awards ==
On the Mothers Day of 2017, Munchee and The Daily Star organised social media initiative "Mayer Daka Naam" (lit. the name my mother calls me by) to post that name on Facebook, a campaign that was awarded Best Digital Advertising Campaign and Best in Social Media Engagement awards at South Asian Digital Media Awards 2017 jointly presented by World Association of Newspapers and News Publishers (WAN-IFRA) and Google. Bangladeshi major social media influencers like Ayman Sadiq, Solaiman Shukhon, Zara Mahbub, and Arif R Hossain were among those who posted their names of affection on Facebook on that Mother's Day.

AsiaOne magazine and United Research Services declared Munchee as the Fastest Growing Brand in Bangladesh in 2018.

=== Award list ===
Year	Award	Image	Awarding Body
2017	Best in Social Media Engagement awards		South Asian Digital Media Awards, WAN-IFRA
2018	Fastest Growing Brand in Bangladesh		AsiaOne

== Variants ==
Munchee has multiple variants.

Name	Description
Next	Thick coatings of sweet chocolate on crisp biscuits.
Yummy Wafers	Crispy wafers with two layers of the soft and sweet chocolate cream.
Choco Crunchee	Textured biscuit made from chocolate and biscuit released in October, 2019.
Choco Mo Peanut Fantasy	Roasted peanut in crispy biscuits covered with chocolate.
Choco Mo Regular	Thick coatings of sweet chocolate on crispy biscuits.
Choco Caramel	Sandwich biscuit released in October, 2019.
Chunky Choc Regular	Milk chocolate between two crispy biscuits.
Chunky Choc Milk Creme	Cream and milk chocolate between two crispy biscuits.
Chocolate Fingers	Crisp "finger" biscuit coated in milk chocolate.
Milkaas Butter Scotch	A chocolate sandwich biscuit enriched with reach creamy chocolate filling.
Milkaas Chocolate cream	A crunchy biscuit filled with butterscotch centre.
Kalo	A sandwich biscuit with a milk cream centred filling.
Ringo	Doughnut-shaped soft and light biscuit.
Premium Nice Biscuits	Premium soft and light biscuits with a coconut tang and drizzled white sugar.
Gluco Milk	Soft round shaped biscuits that is crusty on the outside and filled with taste of milk.
Chocolate Chips Cookies	Crispy cookies with chocolate chips.
