= SMAK (brand) =

Sri Lanka beverage brand

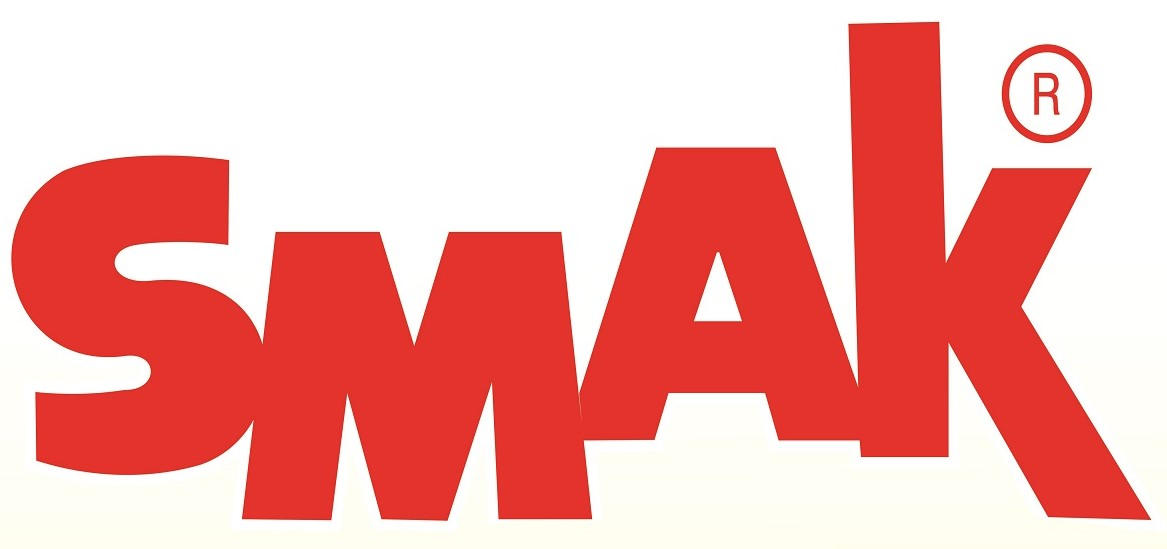
- SMAK logo

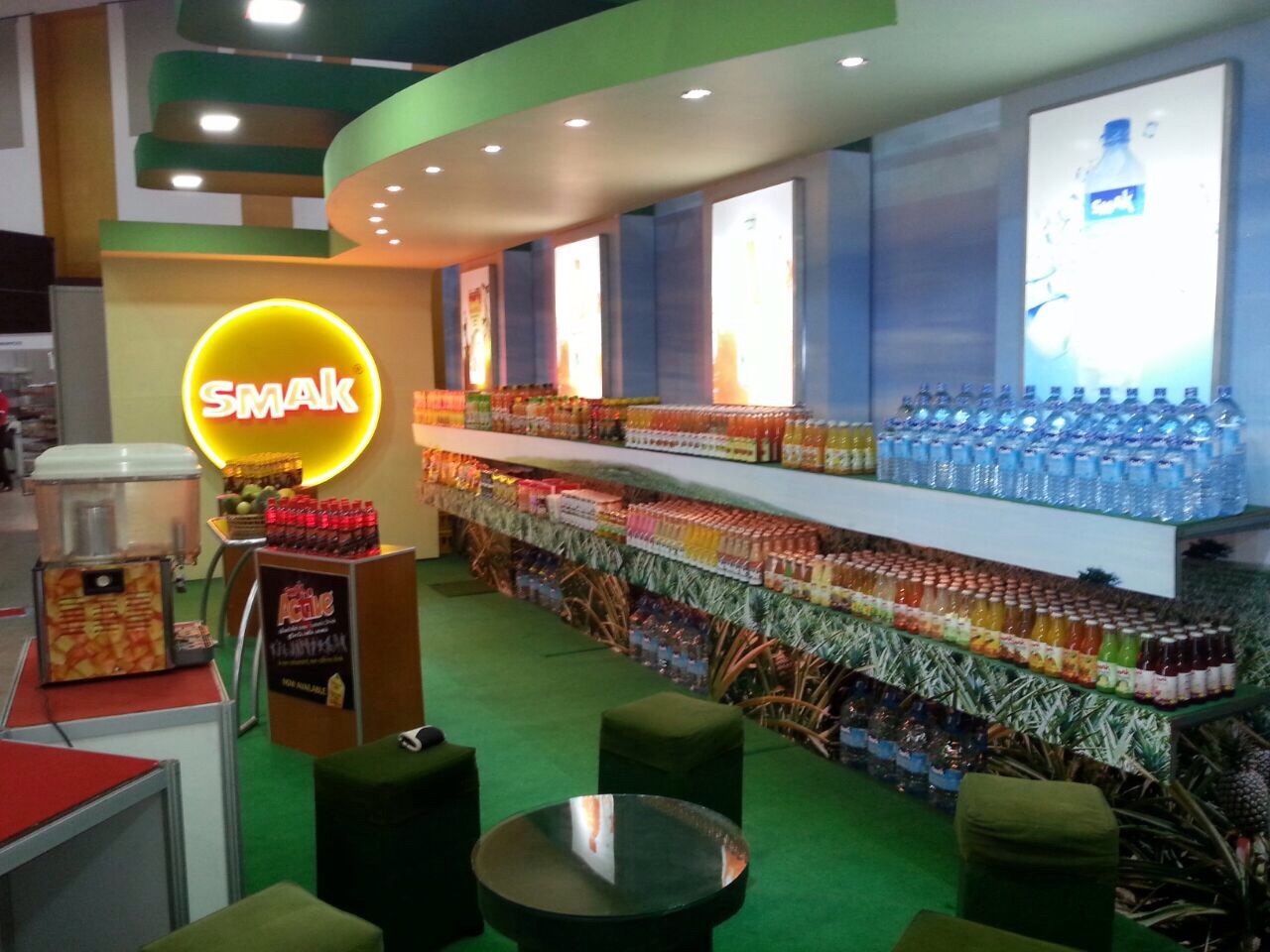
- SMAK stall in Colombo
- Product type: Natural Fruit juices Dairy products Fruit preserves Mineral water Snacks
- Current owner: Daya Kumanayake; Dharmasiri Alahakoon; Sarath Alahakoon
- Produced by: Country Style Foods Private Limited
- Country: Sri Lanka
- Introduced: February 5, 1981; 45 years ago
- Related brands: Cargills Kist; Cecil; Minute Maid; Tropicana
- Markets: Sri Lanka, Australia, Canada; England, Germany, Italy; Middle East & New Zealand
- Tagline: Full of Natural Goodness
- Website: smak.lk

SMAK is a popular and one of the largest beverage, natural fruit juice, fruit preserves, snack and dairy products brand in Sri Lanka. The brand is owned by Country Style Foods Private Limited and was established in 1981. The company holds over 70% market share in non-carbonated beverages category in Sri Lanka.

== History ==
Country Style Foods Private Limited was established on 5 February 1981 by three brothers (Daya Kumanayake, Dharmasiri Alahakoon and Sarath Alahakoon) with ten employees in Kadawatha. The company started producing natural fruit juices and jams under the brand name "SMAK". By late 1990s, the company started exporting its products to Australia, Canada, England, Germany, Italy, Middle East and to New Zealand. By 2010, the company started producing Mineral water, snacks and Dairy products under the same brand name.

== Products ==
Country Style Foods Private Limited produces natural fruit juices, fruit preserves, mineral water, snacks and dairy products under the brand name SMAK. Drinks are produced from 100% local fresh fruits and dairy without the use of any artificial colour or flavours. The fruit juices and nectar are sold in PET bottles, Tetra Paks & glass bottles.

=== Juices & Nectar ===
The company produces drinks in the following flavours;

- Ambarella
- Chocolate
- Coffee
- Iramusu
- Lime
- Mandarin & Papaya
- Mango
- Mixed fruit
- Pineapple
- Soursop
- Tamarind
- Wood apple

=== Snack ===
- Cassava Chips
- Cheese and Onion Bite
- Deviled Chickpea
- Fried dal
- Garlic mixed bite
- Hot and spicy mixture
- Indian Mixed Bite
- Onion mixed bite
- Spicy bite

== See also ==
- List of companies of Sri Lanka
