= Milco =

Sri Lankan dairy company

- Native name: Milk Industries of Lanka (Pvt) Ltd
- Type: State-owned enterprise
- Industry: Dairy products
- Predecessor: National Milk Board
- Founded: 1956 (as National Milk Board)
- Headquarters: Colombo, Sri Lanka
- Area served: Sri Lanka
- Products: Milk, milk powder, yoghurt, curd, butter, cheese, ice cream, condensed milk, ghee
- Brands: Highland
- Owner: Government of Sri Lanka
- Website: milco.lk

Milk Industries of Lanka (Pvt) Ltd (also known as Milco) is a Sri Lankan state-owned dairy producer.

== History ==
Milco was initially established as the National Milk Board (NMB) by the Government of Ceylon in 1956. The NMB was created to develop the domestic dairy industry, improve milk collection and processing, and reduce the country's dependence on imported dairy products.

In response to economic reform programs and restructuring in the 1980s, National Milk Board was renamed as Milk Industries of Lanka Company Limited in 1986. The newly re-established company assumed operations of mil processing and marketing previously performed by the NMB.

In 1998, the company was again rebranded to Kiriya Milk Industries of Lanka (Pvt) Ltd following the privatisation of a portion of government dairy operations.

By 2000, the Sri Lankan government reacquired the company, again pivoting its operations to Milk Industries of Lanka (Pvt) Ltd, commonly known as Milco.

=== Losses ===
Milco endured turbulent period from 2017 to 2019 in terms of incurring massive losses. The company's balance sheet for 2017 reflected a loss of 637 million rupees, whereas the 2018 annual report of the company reflected a loss of 820 million rupees. In 2019, Milco recorded loss of 619 million rupees in their financial statements.

In 2018, reports circulated regarding Milco's delayed payment obligations to its dairy farmers, and as a result, the dairy farmers decided to opt for alternative options to sell out their produce to Milco's longstanding rivals, including Pelwatte Sugar Industries and Cargills. It was later pointed out that the revenue generated by Milco from its operations had been predominantly spent for ambitious investment projects undertaken by the company management, thereby causing an opportunity cost in terms of not meeting the payment obligations for their dairy farmers on time.

As of October 2024, Milco had reported an outstanding bank loan of 1.8 billion rupees under the non-current liabilities column in their statement of financial position. Milco's statement of financial position also reflected an accrued interest payment of 240 million rupees under the current liabilities category. In October 2024, Milco also achieved its highest monthly earnings in its business history when it generated a monthly sales target of 2 billion rupees.

During the administration and presidency of Ranil Wickremasinghe, it was planned by the then Sri Lankan government to sell Milco due to the persistent losses incurred during their production and sales. There were sources claiming Milco could enter into privatization with a possible takeover by India's Amul Dairy Company in a Sri Lanka-India joint venture.

However, the plans to sell Milco were shelved due to the change in government after Anura Kumara Dissanayake had been elected as the president of Sri Lanka following the 2024 Sri Lankan presidential election. Anura Kumara Dissanayake's government announced plans to stabilize the operational workflow of Milco to transform it into a profitable enterprise.

== See also ==
- List of government-owned companies of Sri Lanka
