= Dankotuwa =

Coordinates: 7°17′48″N 79°53′18″E

Dankotuwa is a small town situated in Puttalam District, North Western Province, Sri Lanka. It is located 12 km (7.5 mi) away from Negombo, 47 km (29 mi) from Colombo and 62 km (39 mi) from Kurunegala. Dankotuwa is a junction town, connecting Colombo - Negombo - Kuliyapitiya main road and Negombo - Kurunegala main road. Dankotuwa Porcelain, a porcelain tableware manufacturing company, is based in Dankotuwa. The company employs 1,500 people.
