= Maliban =

Bakery product manufacturer in Sri Lanka

Maliban Biscuit Manufactories Limited
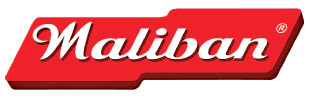
- Type: Limited liability
- Industry: Biscuits; Snack food
- Founded: 1954
- Founder: Angulugha Gamage Hinni Appuhamy
- Headquarters: Ratmalana, Colombo, Sri Lanka
- Area served: International
- Key people: A. G. Kumudika Fernando (Group Chairperson)
- Brands: Maliban Biscuits; Maliban Milk (milk powder); Maliban Mineral Waters (mineral water); Zellers Chocolates; Little Lion Bakeries
- Website: www.malibanbiscuit.com

Maliban Biscuit Manufactories, is one of the largest manufacturers, distributors and marketers of bakery products in Sri Lanka. Maliban is a privately owned limited liability company.

== History ==
The company was founded in 1954 by Angulugaha Gamage Hinni Appuhamy. Appuhamy was born 2 December 1902 in the village of Akmeemana, the son of Angulugaha Gamage Cornelis Appuhamy and Kankanamgamage Kathirinahamy. He had his early education at St. Aloysius College, Galle. At the age of seventeen, in 1922, he left school and home and traveled to Colombo to seek his fortunes. After opening his own tea kiosk on Maliban Street, Pettah in 1928, he converted the shop into a small hotel in 1935. Appuhamy opened his second hotel at First Cross Street and then moved it to a larger premises in Norris Road. He subsequently opened hotels at Baseline Road, another at Norris Road and at Chatham Street. He invited his brothers, A. G. Wickramapala and A. G. Jinadasa to join him in managing the expanding business.

Appuhamy then opened a bakery, which initially sold bread but later added hand made biscuits to their range. One of the first biscuits produced was the Maliban Marie biscuit. In order to satisfy the demand he purchased a biscuit cutter from India to assist in the biscuit manufacturing.

Appuhamy bought 0.204 ha (0.50 acres) of land at Kirulapana, where they established a dairy (which was later shifted to Nawala). The Kirulapana property was then used to commence the hand-operated bottling of Maliban Mineral Waters. He also entered into the ice cream industry, opening the Maliban Cream House in Colpetty.

In 1945 after World War II the assets of the businesses carried out by the three brothers were incorporated into Maliban Hotels Limited. The business included six hotels, one tearoom, an ice cream parlour, a mineral water company and bakery.

The company the purchased a plant from Baker Perkins and on 5 August 1954 Maliban Biscuits commenced full-scale production. In 1954 the bakery section of Maliban Hotels Ltd was subsequently converted into a limited liability company, Maliban Biscuit Manufactories Ltd.

In 1965, the company's operations were shifted to a new factory complex, which was constructed on a 4.1 ha (10 acres) site in Ratmalana. The company also has the distinction of being the first food company to achieve the National Quality Award in 1996. Winning the award again in 2010 and 2015. The company has also been awarded the 'Global Performance Excellence Award' in 2016 and 2018 by the Asia Pacific Quality Organisation. In 2020 they won the 'Brand Excellence Award' at the Sri Lanka Best Brand Awards...

In 1970, Hinni Appuhamy died leaving his company to his son, Rathnapala Samaraweera. In the 1970s and 1980s the company had over 85% of the Sri Lankan biscuit market. In 1993 a modern plant was installed at a cost of Rs 350 million, increasing capacity by further 20 t (20 long tons; 22 short tons)/day.

The company now employs over 1,800 people and works continuous 24-hour shifts, producing 36 million packs of biscuits per annum and exporting their products to over 35 countries. It has over 40% market share of the Sri Lankan biscuit market.

In 2020 the company announced that it would be diversifying into the production of pharmaceuticals, as part of the government's plans to establish a self-sufficient local pharmaceutical manufacturing industry.

On 21 August 2024, A. G. Kumudika Fernando was appointed as the new group chairperson of the Maliban Group, following the passing of her father, A. G. Ratnapala Samaraweera, the company's previous chairman.

== See also ==
- Ceylon Biscuits Limited
