= Ambeon Holdings =

Sri Lankan conglomerate company

Ambeon Holdings PLC
- Logo of Ambeon Holdings PLC
- Formerly: Walker and Greig (1874-2007); Environmental Resources Investment (2007-2013); Lanka Century Investments (2013-2018)
- Type: Public
- Traded as: CSE: GREG.N0000
- ISIN: LK0168N00001
- Industry: Holding company; Information technology; Manufacturing; Financial services; Real estate
- Founded: December 29, 1910; 115 years ago
- Founder: John Walker
- Headquarters: Colombo, Sri Lanka
- Key people: Sujeewa Mudalige (Chairman); Sanjeeva Narangoda (Chief Executive)
- Revenue: ▲LKR17,530 million (2025)
- Operating income: ▼LKR2,752 million (2025)
- Net income: ▼LKR2,025 million (2025)
- Total assets: ▲LKR30,788 million (2025)
- Total equity: ▲LKR14,168 million (2025)
- Parent: Ambeon Capital PLC
- Subsidiaries: See text
- Website: ambeonholdings.com

Ambeon Holdings PLC is a conglomerate holding company based in Sri Lanka. John Walker who established Walker Sons and Company is the founder of the company. In 1874, Walker founded Walker and Greig to supply agricultural machinery to plantations in the hill country. The company was incorporated in 1910 and in 1959, it was brought under Brown and Company. In 1970, the company was listed on the Colombo Stock Exchange.

When Lionhart Investment Limited acquired the company in 2007, operations under the new owners proved to be controversial. The Securities and Exchange Commission launched a probe into the company when a subsidiary of the company sold a platinum mine in South Africa at a profit. The directors of the company were fined for document falsification. Harsha de Silva accused the company and its parent of stock manipulation in the parliament in 2013. Taprobane Holdings, a consortium of Navitas Holdings, Galle Face Hotel Group and Hirdaramani Group, acquired the company in 2015. In 2018, the company was renamed Ambeon Holdings. Ambeon Holdings is one of the LMD 100 companies in Sri Lanka. The company is also one of the top 20 conglomerates in the country. Ambeon Holdings controls or has controlled a number of notable subsidiaries including Ceylon Leather Products (disposed in June 2023), Dankotuwa Porcelain and Royal Fernwood Porcelain (both disposed in July 2023), MillenniumIT ESP, Harischandra Mills PLC, Myland Developments PLC and Colombo City Holdings PLC.

== History ==
=== Colonial origin and post-independence Browns subsidiary ===
John Walker, a Scottish engineer who established Walker Sons and Company is the founder of the company. In 1874, Walker established Walker and Greig in Badulla and Haldumulla to supply agricultural machinery to the plantations in those areas. With the growing importance of Haputale, the Haldumulla shop was closed, and a new shop opened in Haputale. The headquarters of Walker and Greig was moved to Slave Island, Colombo later. The Colombo headquarters extended over five acres. The company was incorporated as a limited liability company in 1910. Walker and Greig Company was brought under Brown and Company in 1959. The company was listed on the Colombo Stock Exchange on 1 January 1970.

=== Lionhart acquisition and SEC probe ===
UK-based Lionhart Investments Limited acquired Walker and Greig in 2007 from Browns Group for LKR76 million. The company was renamed Environmental Resources Investment PLC in the following year. Environmental Resources Investment and Ceylon Leather Products acquired Dankotuwa Porcelain for LKR433 million in 2010. In the same year, the Securities and Exchange Commission launched a probe into Environmental Ressources Investments for stock manipulation. A platinum mine in South Africa bought by a subsidiary incorporated in the British Virgin Islands was the cause of the investigation. Despite the company selling the platinum mine at a capital gain, the investigation continued by the Securities and Exchange Commission. The UNP parliamentarian Harsha de Silva accused Lionhart of pumping and dumping in the parliament in 2013. Each of the directors of the company was charged with an LKR3.3 million fine for document falsification and non-disclosure.

=== New ownership under Taprobane ===
The company's name was changed to Lanka Century Investments in November 2013. Taprobane Holdings PLC, a consortium of Navitas Holdings, Galle Face Hotel Group, and Hirdaramani Group took control of Lanka Century Investments in 2015. Lanka Century Investments acquired MillenniumIT ESP from the London Stock Exchange Group in 2017 for LKR1079.1 million. In June 2018, the company adopted its current name, Ambeon Holdings PLC, while its parent became Ambeon Capital PLC. Collectively they are called the Ambeon Group.

== Operations ==
Ambeon Holdings and its parent Ambeon Capital both are LMD 100 companies. LMD 100 ranks Sri Lankan listed companies by revenue annually. Ambeon Capital and Ambeon Holdings are ranked 52nd and 53rd in its 2020/21 edition published in 2022. Ambeon Holdings is one of the top 20 conglomerates in Sri Lanka by brand value. Brand Finance calculates the brand value of Ambeon Holdings to be worth LKR3,224 million in 2019. Ambeon Holdings sold its subsidiary South Asia Textiles to Hayleys Fabric PLC for LKR4 billion in 2021. Ambeon Holdings acquired South Asia Textiles in 2011.

== Finances ==
Ten-year financial summary
Year	Revenue LKR mns	Profit LKR mns	Assets LKR mns	Total equity LKR mns	Net assets per share LKR
2022	14,155	2,519	22,892	10,623	24.99
2021	9,596	(2,103)	21,823	7,909	17.67
2020	10,554	409	24,462	9,775	22.88
2019	9,438	864	22,587	9,353	21.70
2018	4,528	681	20,187	8,893	21.96
2017	3,868	394	13,797	7,859	19.67
2016	3,098	(1,642)	13,063	7,392	19.21
2015	3,535	(58)	13,377	8,313	23
2014	3,799	(678)	12,332	8,356	20.98
2013	3,314	(226)	12,046	9,123	22.97

Source: Annual Report, 2021/22 (p. 143)

=== Subsidiaries ===
Subsidiary	Group holding	Fair value LKR (mns)	Activity
Ceylon Leather Products	99.90%	538	Manufacturing and retailing leather footwear
Colombo City Holdings PLC	77.63%	1,503	Real estate
Dankotuwa Porcelain PLC	77.51%	2,765	Manufacturing porcelain tableware
MillenniumIT ESP	60.75%		IT solutions. A sub-subsidiary
Royal Fernwood Porcelain	74.17%		Manufacturing porcelain tableware. A sub-subsidiary
Taprobane Capital Plus	100.00%	509	Investment management

Source: Annual Report, 2021/22 (pp. 99–100)

== See also ==
- List of companies listed on the Colombo Stock Exchange
