= Ratmalana =

Ratmalana රත්මලාන இரத்மலானை
- Suburb
- Location in Sri Lanka Ratmalana (Sri Lanka)
- Coordinates: 06°49′19″N 79°53′10″E
- Country: Sri Lanka
- Province: Western Province
- District: Colombo District

Area
  - Total: 13.0 km^{2} (5.0 sq mi)

Population (2012-03-20)
  - Total: 95,506
- Time zone: UTC+5.30 (SLST)
- Area code: 011

Ratmalana is a suburb in Colombo District, Western Province, Sri Lanka. It is inside the administration boundary of Dehiwala-Mount Lavinia Municipal Council. Ratmalana is situated 14.6 km south of Colombo city centre. Ratmalana Airport located here was the country's first and main international airport until the inauguration of Bandaranaike International Airport, Katunayake in 1967. Ratmalana is also the birthplace of Sir John Kotelawala, the third Prime Minister of Sri Lanka (then Ceylon) elected in 1953.

Maliban Biscuit Manufactories, one of the largest manufacturers, distributors and marketers of bakery products in Sri Lanka, is headquartered in Ratmalana.
