= Sarasavi Bookshop =

Book retail chain in Sri Lanka

Sarasavi Bookshop (Pvt) Ltd
- Type: Privately held company
- Industry: Retail; Bookselling; Wholesale publishing and distribution Import and export
- Founded: 1973
- Headquarters: 2B, Samudradevi Mawatha, Nugegoda, Sri Lanka
- Number of locations: 29 stores
- Area served: Sri Lanka
- Key people: Chandu Haputhanthri (Managing director)
- Products: Books, Maps
- Number of employees: 500
- Website: www.sarasavi.lk

Sarasavi Bookshop (Pvt) Ltd is a bookstore chain in Sri Lanka. Currently Sarasavi Bookshop is the largest bookstore chain in Sri Lanka with branches covering major cities in the island.
