= List of statutory boards of Sri Lanka =

This is a list of statutory boards controlled by the central government of Sri Lanka.

== Universities ==
- Buddhasravaka Bhikku University
- Buddhist and Pali University of Sri Lanka
- Eastern University, Sri Lanka
- General Sir John Kotelawala Defence University
- Open University of Sri Lanka
- Rajarata University of Sri Lanka
- Sabaragamuwa University of Sri Lanka
- South Eastern University of Sri Lanka
- University of Colombo
- University of Jaffna
- University of Kelaniya
- University of Moratuwa
- University of Peradeniya
- University of Ruhuna
- University of Sri Jayewardenepura
- Wayamba University of Sri Lanka

== Hospitals ==
- Angoda Mental Hospital
- Ayurveda Teaching Hospital, Borella
- Cancer Hospital, Maharagama
- Castle Street Hospital for Women
- Chest Hospital, Welisara
- Colombo North General Hospital, Ragama
- De Zoysa Hospital for Women
- Eye Hospital, Colombo
- General Hospital, Colombo South
- Homeopathy Hospital, Welisara
- Jaffna Teaching Hospital
- Kandy General Hospital
- Karapitiya Teaching Hospital
- Kegalle General Hospital
- Lady Ridgeway Hospital for Children
- Mahamodara General Hospital
- Peradeniya Teaching Hospital
- Sri Jayawardenapura General Hospital

== Other ==
- Arthur C. Clarke Institute for Modern Technologies
- Atomic Energy Authority
- Ayurvedic Medical Council
- Board of Investment of Sri Lanka
- Central Cultural Fund
- Central Environmental Authority
- Central Freight Bureau of Sri Lanka
- Ceylon Fishery Harbours Corporation
- Clothing Industry Training Institute
- Coconut Cultivation Board
- Coconut Development Authority
- Coconut Research Board
- Common Amenities Board
- Council for Information Technology (CINTEC)
- Energy Conservation Fund
- Fair Trading Commission
- Gamphaha Wickramarachchi Ayurveda Institute
- Gem & Jewellery Research and Training Institute
- Geological Survey & Mines Bureau
- Hadabima Authority of Sri Lanka
- Hector Kobbkduwa Agrarian Research & Training Institute
- Human Rights Commission of Sri Lanka
- Industrial Development Board
- Industrial Technology Institute (CISIR)
- Institute of Aesthetic Studies
- Institute of Construction, Training & Development (ICTAD)
- Institute of Indigenous Medicine (IIM)
- Institute of Policy Studies
- Institute of Post Harvest Technology
- Institute of Survey & Mapping
- Institute of Technology, University of Moratuwa
- Institute of Workers' Education
- Insurance Board of Sri Lanka
- Land Reform Commission
- Mahaweli Authority of Sri Lanka
- Marine Pollution Prevention Authority
- National Apprenticeship & Industrial Training Authority
- National Aquaculture Development Authority
- National Aquatic Resources & Development Agency
- National Authority on Teachers' Education
- National Building Research Organisation
- National Child Protection Authority
- National Crafts Council
- National Dangerous Drugs Control Board
- National Engineering, Research & Development Centre of Sri Lanka
- National Gem & Jewellery Authority
- National Housing Development Authority
- National Human Resources Development Council of Sri Lanka
- National Institute of Corporative Development
- National Institute of Education
- National Institute of Fundamental Studies (NIFS)
- National Institute of Fisheries and Nautical Engineering
- National Institute of Library & Information Sciences (NILIS)
- National Institute of Plantation Management
- National Institute of Social Development
- National Institute of Technical Education
- National Science & Technology Commission
- National Science Foundation
- National Transport Commission
- National Youth Services Council
- Official Languages Commission
- Palmyrah Development Board
- Post Graduate Institute of Agriculture
- Post Graduate Institute of Archaeology
- Post Graduate Institute of Management
- Post Graduate Institute of Medicine
- Post Graduate Institute of Pali & Buddhist Studies
- Post Graduate Institute of Science
- Public Enterprises Reform Commission
- Rana Viru Seva Authority
- Rehabilitation of Persons, Properties and Industries Authority
- Road Development Authority
- Rubber Research Institute of Sri Lanka
- Samurdhi Authority of Sri Lanka
- Securities & Exchange Commission of Sri Lanka
- Southern Development Authority of Sri Lanka
- Sri Lanka Accounting & Auditing Standard Monitoring Board
- Sri Lanka Council for Agricultural Research Policy
- Sri Lanka Export Development Board
- Sri Lanka Foundation Institute
- Sri Lanka Institute of Advance Technical Education
- Sri Lanka Institute of Development Administration
- Sri Lanka Institute of Local Governance
- Sri Lanka Institute of Printing
- Sri Lanka Inventors' Commission
- Sri Lanka National Designs Centre
- Sri Lanka National Library & Documentation Services Board
- Sri Lanka Press Council
- Sri Lanka Social Security Board
- Sri Lanka Standards Institution
- Sri Lanka Tea Board
- Sri Lanka Tourist Board
- Sugarcane Research Institute
- Sugathadassa National Sports Complex Authority
- Superior Court Complex Board of Management
- Tea Research Board
- Tea Small Holdings Development Authority
- Telecommunication Regulatory Commission of Sri Lanka
- Tertiary and Vocational Education Commission
- Textile Quota Board
- Textile Training & Services Centre
- Tower Hall Theater Foundation
- University Grants Commission
- University of Colombo School of Computing
- Vijaya Kumaratunga Hospital
- Vocational Training Authority of Sri Lanka
- Water Resources Board

== See also ==
- List of government owned companies in Sri Lanka
