= MillenniumIT ESP =

Sri Lanka-based information technology firm

Millennium IT ESP

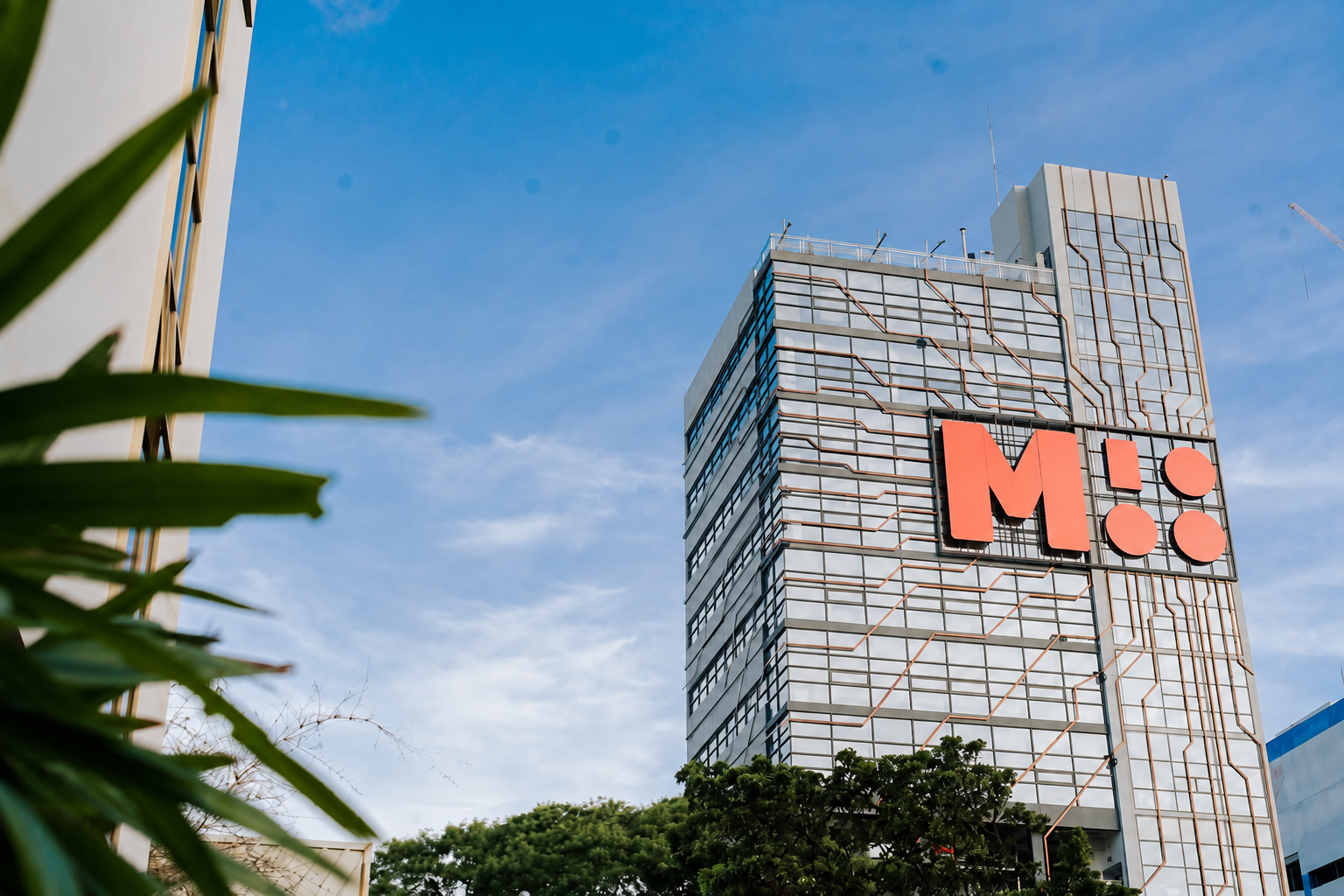
- Millennium IT ESP Headquarters, Colombo
- Type: Private
- Industry: Information Technology
- Founded: 1996; 30 years ago in Malabe, Sri Lanka
- Founder: Tony Weerasinghe
- Number of locations: Sri Lanka; Australia; Singapore; Bangladesh
- Area served: Worldwide
- Key people: Harendra Samarasinghe (CEO); Jan Verhulst(COO)
- Products: Network Solutions; Vision Platform; IOT Platforms; FQMS
- Services: Systems Integration; Software Development; Managed Services
- Revenue: ▲US$50 million (2015)
- Number of employees: 500 (2023)
- Parent: Ambeon Holdings
- Divisions: Networking & Security; Managed Services; Platforms; Business Applications; Software Development; Smart Buildings

Millennium IT ESP(MiT) is a Sri Lankan information technology company. Headquartered in Colombo, Sri Lanka, MIT was also involved in offering industry-specific solutions tailored for banking and finance, telecommunications, government, manufacturing and retail, and commercial sectors.

== History ==
=== Foundations and early years ===
The company was founded in 1996 by Tony Weerasinghe as a systems integrator and Sun Microsystems authorized reseller. MillenniumIT entered the software design field the following year when it interpreted a systems integration contract from the Colombo Stock Exchange (CSE) as an opportunity to design and install a straight-through processing system for the Exchange. The CSE system became the basis for MillenniumIT's suite of capital-markets software products. In 2000 MillenniumIT became Sun Microsystems' regional distributor for Bangladesh, Nepal and Maldives. Its capital-markets software found a number of customers around the world, and in 2001 MillenniumIT won its first major US contract and set up operations in Boston, MA.

In 2002, the firm moved into its new corporate headquarters, the first Silicon Valley style software campus in Sri Lanka. The company was awarded contracts in Boston and Nairobi. It also continued to expand by opening a UK subsidiary and office in 2004. The following year, the company was contracted to provide an automated equity, ETF and options-trading system for the American Stock Exchange (AMEX).

Live trading at the American Stock Exchange commenced in 2006, even as the company received a US patent on its Business Innovation Dynamically (BID) technology. At home in Sri Lanka, MillenniumIT commenced implementation of a countrywide intranet for the national fixed-line telecoms provider, SLT, while US operations expanded with a new office in Jersey City, New Jersey.

=== London Stock Exchange Group acquisition ===
Following a contract with London Stock Exchange (part of London Stock Exchange Group - LSEG) for a new trading platform for equities, MillenniumIT was acquired by LSEG in 2009. The acquisition gave the company a footing in international competition, and a number of orders from around the world followed shortly.

=== Acquisition by Ambeon Holdings ===
In 2017, Millennium IT ESP was acquired by Ambeon Holdings, then called Lanka Century Investments (LCI), as both management and shareholding. Under the terms of the agreement, LCI will acquire a 100% stake of MillenniumIT ESP from London Stock Exchange Group (LSEG) with management and shareholding control. As part of this acquisition agreement, LCI will also enter into a wider ownership plan with the employees of MillenniumIT ESP giving them an equity stake and enabling them to play a role in shaping the company’s future as owner managers.

LSEG will retain full ownership of MillenniumIT Software, the trading technology and software development component of the business.

== Regional offices in Singapore and Bangladesh ==
MillenniumIT ESP has incorporated offices and operations in Singapore and Bangladesh to expand its business into new markets and capture the global demand for enterprise technology solutions. The Singapore office serves as a hub for its international operations, particularly in the ASEAN region. Bangladesh serves as a location to capitalize on manufacturing enterprises in the technology area.
