= CameraLK =

Sri Lankan technological company

- Company type: Private
- Industry: Retailing
- Founded: 2010; 16 years ago
- Founder: Anushka Gunasinghe
- Headquarters: No. 623, Highlevel Road, Colombo
- Area served: Sri Lanka
- Key people: Anushka Gunasinghe (Founder & Managing Director); Noeline Pereira Gunasinghe (Directress)
- Number of employees: 63+
- Website: cameralk.com

CameraLK is a Sri Lankan retailing company which focuses on photography, electronic devices, digital cameras, and entertainment. The company was founded in 2010 by Anushka Gunasinghe as a small home business. The brand has distributed well over 35 branches island-wide and is now one of the largest independent retailers of photographic and digital equipment in Sri Lanka.

== History ==
CameraLK was founded in 2010 by Gunasinghe, who dropped out of his higher studies from an IT education institution. Later in 2011 at the age of 23, he founded the brand CameraLK as a small-scale home business. Initially, he started to sell cameras through pre-orders. After promotions through social media and online marketing platforms, the company became more well-known. Together with his wife, and within two years of its inception, the company grew considerably in the Sri Lankan camera market.

=== Expansion ===
During the first five-year period from 2011 to 2015, CameraLK showed a gradual rise in the economy and an increase in traveling leisure activities. The photography market boom coincided with a sudden flourish in the tourism industry after the end of the 30-year war in Sri Lanka. During the period, CameraLK achieved a 100% sales profit.

In late 2011, when cameras became a tax-free commodity, the company expanded itself. The company captured 65-70% of the total market share. During this period, CameraLK launched its sales campaign through its official website and recorded an annual growth of around 10-15%.

In 2014, Gunasinghe started CameraLK Photography Academy by establishing a service center in Colombo. After the establishment of the main showroom at Colombo 05 in 2015, CameraLK has constantly made donations and have been involved in annual CSR projects. In 2015, the company initiated CameraLK Annual Award Ceremony. On 8 July 2016, CameraLK hosted its second consecutive “CameraLK Awards Ceremony" at the BMICH. In 2016 CameraLK was involved in the launch of Sonys new Extra Bass headphones. Later in August 2017, CameraLK provided a special buy-back offer to buy a new Sony Camera with a discount offer for used cameras. Also in 2017, CameraLK announced the collaboration with Sony International (Singapore) Ltd. and the opening of their joint digital imaging showroom.

In January 2018, under the 'CameraLK Community Care' program, Camera LK decided to build a house for the wife and three-year-old child of the young man who was unfortunately shot dead by the police in Kataragama. In collaboration with the Sri Lanka Police, the foundation stone was laid on 25 January 2018 to begin work on the house whereas CameraLK offered to pay for the child's education up to high school. In 2018, CameraLK organized "Image Expo-2018" which is the largest photography equipment festival in Sri Lanka. The exhibition held on 5 to 7 October 2018 from 9.30 am to 7.30 pm at the “Mihilaka Madura” of the BMICH.

At the end of 2019, the company had established five showrooms in Kandy and Colombo and increased its staff capacity to 63 employees. In October 2019, The fifth CameraLK Award Ceremony 2019 was held at the ICBT Campus Auditorium. During the ceremony, the company distributed basic and advanced photography course certificates and faculty awards. In April 2020, CameraLK presented drone cameras to the Commander of the Army, Lieutenant General Shavendra Silva at the Army Headquarters in Akuregoda for use by the Sri Lanka Army to monitor COVID-19 lockdown areas.
