= Rainco =

Privately held company in Sri Lanka

- Trade name: Rainco Pvt Ltd
- Company type: Private
- Founded: 1977; 49 years ago in Kandy, Sri Lanka
- Founder: S. L. M. Fausz
- Headquarters: Colombo, Sri Lanka
- Areas served: Sri Lanka; Maldives; India; Mauritius; Seychelles
- Key people: Fazal Fausz (Chairman)
- Products: Umbrellas; Mosquito Nets; Rainwear
- Brands: Rainco
- Owner: Avarna Ventures
- Parent: Avarna Ventures
- Website: www.rainco.lk

Rainco is a privately held company in Sri Lanka which manufactures umbrellas, mosquito nets and rainwear. Starting as a home-based operation in 1977, as of 2015 the company counts four production factories across the island, a workforce of over 1200 and a dealer network of over 7000. As the first company to obtain ISO 9001-2000 certification and SLS certifications for the manufacture of umbrellas in Sri Lanka, Rainco is also the only producer of ISO 9001-2000 system certified mosquito nets in South Asia. Rainco products are currently exported to Maldives, India, Mauritius, Singapore and Seychelles. The company is also the official representative of several global brands in Sri Lanka including Cartoon Network.

== History ==
Rainco began when entrepreneur S. L. M. Fausz hired 5 employees in 1977 and started making umbrellas through a process of trial and error out of a small house in Kadugannawa, Kandy. Following an arbitrary separation with the partners, the company relaunched as Sri Lanka Umbrella Industries in 1990 and resumed the manufacture of umbrellas under the brand name Globe. In 2000, the company took the Rainco name and by 2003 became the first to obtain ISO 9001-2000 certification for umbrellas in Sri Lanka.

== Products ==
=== Umbrellas ===
Rainco produces 29 varieties of umbrellas, including compact/straight umbrellas for ladies, gents and children as well as garden and beach umbrellas in a variety of colours, designs and fabrics. The company also undertakes the manufacturing of custom-designed, “branded” umbrellas.

=== Mosquito Nets ===
Rainco produces the only ISO 9001-2000 system certified mosquito net in South Asia. The company is also the sole Sri Lankan distributor of PermaNet pre-treated mosquito nets and curtains produced by Swedish firm, Vestergaard Frandsen.

=== Rainwear ===
Rainco also manufactures raincoats and other rainwear garments in a variety of colours and designs.

=== Socks ===
Cottonmax brand of socks for adults and kids

=== Shoe polish ===
Silver brand of shoe polish and other shore care products including shoe deodorant and renovators

=== Baby gear ===
Baby mosquito nets Cot sheets Baby feeding and nursing products

== Factories ==
The company operates four production factories in Kadugannawa and Mawanella which provide employment to over 700 workers and output over half a million umbrellas and over 50,000 mosquito nets monthly.
