= Graduate School of International Development =

Graduate school in Japan

The Graduate School of International Development (GSID) at Nagoya University, Japan, was established in 1991. The school offers master's and doctoral degrees through its Department of International Development and Cooperation, with a focus on the Pacific Rim region.

== Degrees ==
GSID offers both master’s and doctoral degrees through the Department of International Development and Cooperation. The school’s research-based curriculum encourages students to critically assess development challenges, engage with international policy frameworks, and contribute to effective solutions.

== Programs ==
- Economic Development Policy and Management
- Peace and Governance
- Inclusive Society and State
- Education and Human Resource Development
- Poverty and Social Policy
- Special Program for Global Business Professionals
