= Canned tea =

Camellia sinensis leaf-derived beverage in cylindrical metal packages

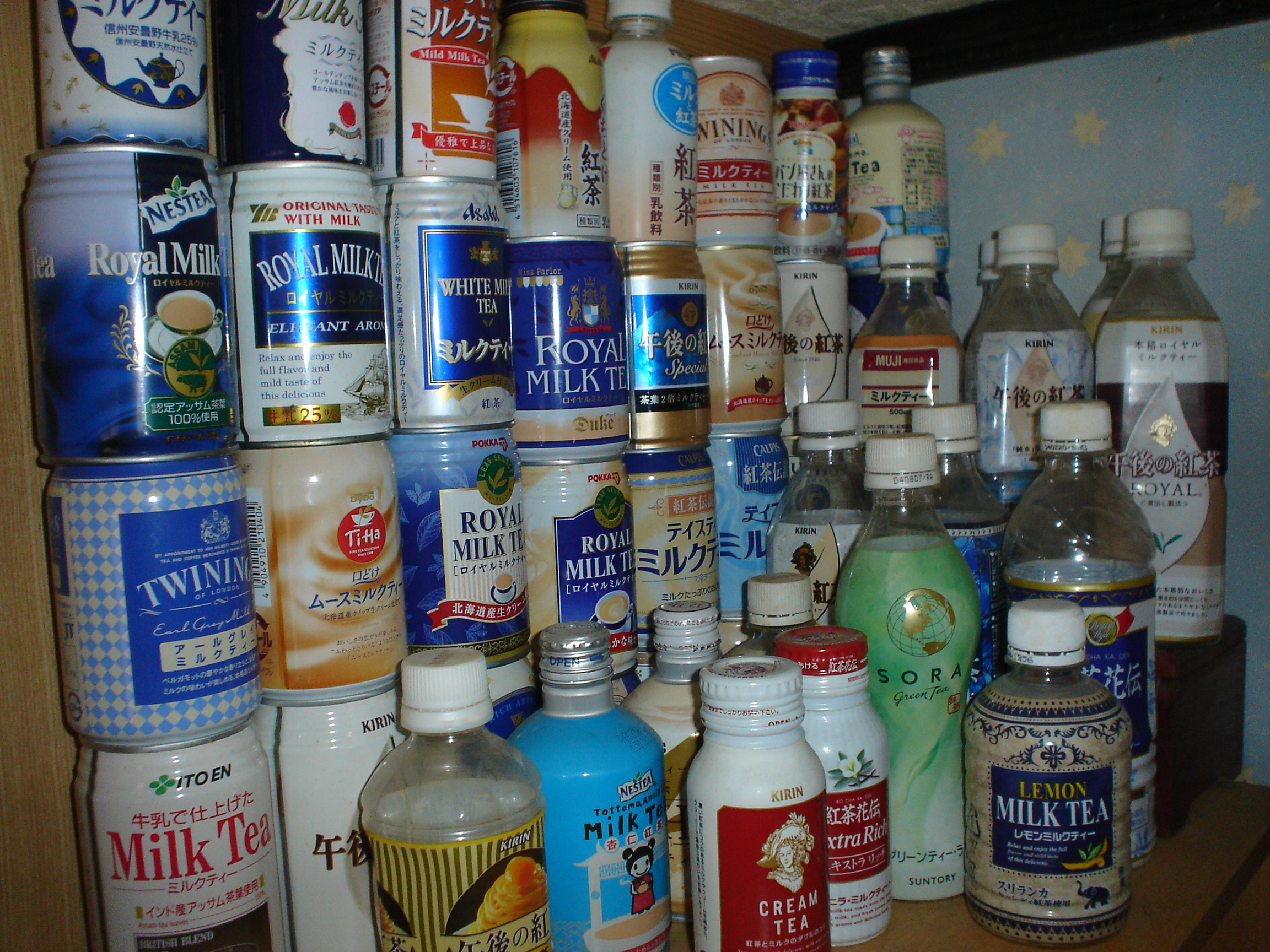
Japanese canned milk teas

Canned tea is a relatively recent method of marketing tea which has been sold traditionally as leaf tea and also, for the last 100 years, in tea bag form. It utilises the canning process to produce a ready made drink. Perceived advantages includes ease of use (minimal or no preparation time) and the possibility of additives (such as flavours or sugar); the disadvantages are the cost of shipment (and therefore the price of the product) and a lack of freshness.

== Tea ==
Tea is a beverage made by steeping processed leaves, buds, or twigs of the plant Camellia sinensis in hot water for a few minutes. The processing can include oxidation (called "fermentation" in the tea industry), heating, drying and the addition of herbs, flowers, spices and fruits. There are four main types of tea: black, oolong, green, and white. Tea is a natural source of caffeine, theophylline, theanine, and antioxidants; but it has almost no fat, carbohydrates, or protein.

Tea has been consumed in China for around 5,000 years.

== Canning ==
Canning is a method of preserving food by heating it to a temperature that destroys contaminating microorganisms, and then sealing it in air-tight jars, cans, or pouches. Patented in the UK in 1810, this method of preservation was not used extensively for soft drinks until the pull tab version was patented in the USA in 1963.

== History ==
In 1981, the first canned tea product, unsweetened oolong, was introduced in Japan by Ito En. The introduction very quickly led to more than one hundred variations, offered both in cans and in bottles. The oolong variety was well suited as the canned tea proved stable even at temperatures up to 50° - 60 °C in vending machines. The tea also appealed to consumers inclined to use vending machines for convenient access "on the street." Further, there are perceived health benefits to canned tea, as opposed to other canned soft drinks, due to tea's portrayal as an aid to maintaining a slim body build.

The introduction of oolong was quickly followed by the development of canned teas based on other tea varieties, including green and black teas. Additional flavor options also included the addition of sweeteners, sugar, milk and lemon, along with other fruit flavors. By 1991, the canned tea market was grossing US$325 million annually, after having doubled in each of the ten years since its introduction.

== Types ==
=== Black tea ===
Black tea, the most oxidized of the four main varieties, is generally stronger in flavor and contains more caffeine than the less oxidized varieties. It is the traditional tea of the western world where it is known simply as "tea".

- Iced tea (unsweetened) is an alternative to carbonated soft drinks, popular in many countries especially the hotter ones. One study has demonstrated that unsweetened canned black tea has a neutral to beneficial effect on dental health.
- Iced tea (sweetened) is popular mainly in the southern United States where it is ubiquitous and available freshly made, in bottles and cans or at self-serve soda fountains. Sweet tea (also known as southern table wine) is brewed very strong with a large amount of sugar added while the tea is still hot. The mixture of sugar and tea is cooled, diluted with water and served over ice garnished with lemon. Alternatively, the sugar and tea mixture is not diluted but rather poured hot over a full tumbler of ice to cool and dilute it. Due mainly to its high sugar content, canned sweet tea has been proven to cause tooth decay.

=== Oolong tea ===
Oolong (Chinese: 烏龍; pinyin: wūlóng) is a traditional Chinese type of tea somewhere between green and black in oxidation. Although it has a taste more akin to green tea than to black tea, it does not have the stridently grassy vegetal notes that typify green tea. The best Oolong has a nuanced flavor profile. It is commonly brewed to be strong and bitter, yet leaving a faintly sweet aftertaste. The first commercially canned Oolong tea was available in Japan in 1981.

=== Green tea ===
Green tea (simplified Chinese: 绿茶; traditional Chinese: 綠茶; pinyin: lǜchá) has undergone minimal oxidation during processing. It is popular in China, Taiwan, Hong Kong, Japan, Korea, and the Middle East. Recently it has become more widespread in the West. The first commercially canned green tea was available in Japan in 1985. Subsequently, other brands have been launched in many countries due mainly to the claimed health and diet benefits of green tea.
