= Ceylon Biscuits Limited =

Sri Lankan food manufacturer

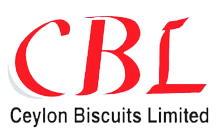
- Formerly: Williams Confectionery Limited
- Industry: Food
- Founded: 1939; 87 years ago Dehiwala, Dehiwala-Mount Lavinia, Sri Lanka.
- Founder: Simon Arthur Wickramasingha
- Headquarters: Pannipitiya, Colombo, Sri Lanka
- Area served: International
- Key people: R S A Wickramasingha (Chairman)
- Products: Biscuits; Chocolate; Cakes; Jelly; Snacks; Soy based products Cereal products Organic products Soups
- Brands: Munchee (biscuits); Ritzbury (chocolate); Tiara (cakes); Lanka Soy (soy products); Nutriline (breakfast cereals); Samaposha (breakfast cereals); Go Jelly (jellies); Samaayu (herbal porridge); Rasa Hari (soups); Cecil (fruits and nuts); Hi Tapper (treacle and jaggery); Ramba (snack foods); Revello (chocolate)
- Revenue: ▼ Rs. 1.996 billion (2018)
- Operating income: ▼ Rs. 561.730 million (2018)
- Net income: ▼ Rs. 118.604 million (2018)
- Total assets: ▲ Rs. 1.364 billion (2018)
- Total equity: ▲ Rs. 1.008 billion (2018)
- Owner: CBL Investments Limited (71.38%); People's Leasing & Finance (7.44%); Dawi Investment Trust (6.75%)
- Number of employees: 286 (2018)
- Parent: CBL Investments
- Subsidiaries: CBL Foods International; CBL Natural Foods; Convenience Foods (Lanka); Plenty Foods; CBL Exports; CBL Bangladesh; Star United
- Website: www.cbllk.com

Ceylon Biscuits Limited (branded CBL, commonly called Munchee) is a Sri Lankan food manufacturer, the maker of Munchee biscuits and one of the oldest biscuit makers in Sri Lanka. The company owns 60% of the domestic market share in Sri Lanka.

== History ==
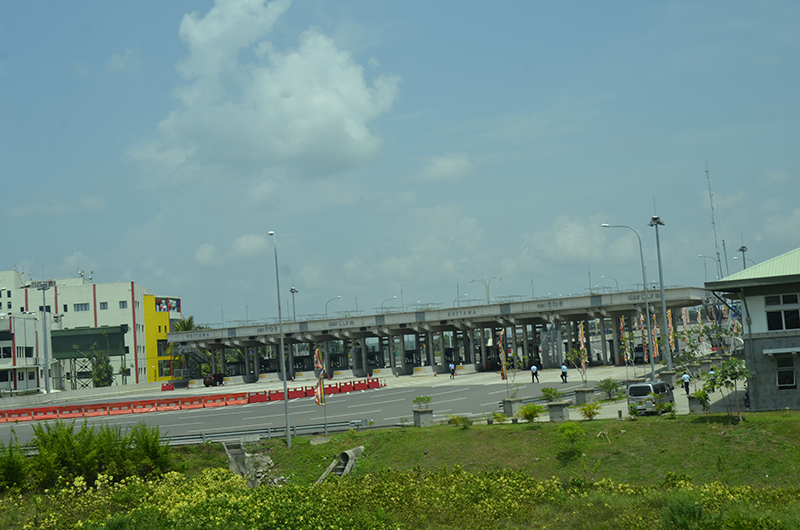
CBL's biscuits factory (on the left) is situated next to the intersection of Southern Expressway

In the 1930s Simon Arthur Wickramasingha (1902-1961) acquired a small factory that produced handmade biscuits from a local businessman called Williams. In 1939 the company Williams Confectionery Limited was formally established in Dehiwela with ten employees. In 1957 the factory was upgraded and mechanised, with Baker Perkins manufacturing lines imported from the UK. Wickramasingha's four sons, N. P. (Pali), R. L. (Ranjith), M. P. (Mineka), and R. S. (Ramya), took over the business when their father died in 1961.

In the 1960s the Ministry of Education, with the assistance of the US based organisation CARE, provided school children with a cup of milk and a bun as nutritional supplements to their midday meal. However, due to the inability to maintain the quality of the bun, CARE began assessing alternatives, eventually settling on biscuits. Mineka Wickramasingha successfully obtained the contract.

As the existing factory in Dehiwala was restricted in its capacity the company in July 1968 opened a new biscuit factory at Pannipitiya to produce the high-protein biscuit for CARE. The factory was operated by Ceylon Biscuits Limited, a newly created subsidiary of Williams (Williams owned 30%, the Wickramasingha family 30%, E. B. Creasy (an English trading company) 30%, the workers 5% and other shareholders 5%). CBL imported two biscuit manufacturing lines from Germany, one for the nutritional biscuit and the other for consumer biscuit production. CBL's involvement with the school biscuit programme continued until 1988, when the programme was terminated. With the introduction of the second plant CBL introduced a range of biscuits to the market under the brand name Munchee. These included two of its own innovations, Hawaiian Cookies and Milk Short Cake, together with generic biscuits nice, ginger and date biscuits.

In the early 1980s the company imported a third (hard dough) manufacturing line. In 1981 they entered into a partnership arrangement with Associated Biscuits (AB), with AB purchasing E.B. Creasy's 30% equity in the company. As a result of this partnership and the new manufacturing line CBL was able to produce Huntley & Palmers' cream crackers and wafers, together with its own line of cream crackers and wafers. The company then purchased a second hard dough manufacturing line from AB. In 1982 Nabisco acquired Associated Biscuits, which maintained its ongoing relationship with CBL. Through Nabisco CBL was able to purchase another soft dough biscuit line, which it used to produce a new line of cream biscuits. The relationship ended when Nabisco sold its shares in CBL to a Hong Kong-based investor.

In 1991 the company expanded into chocolate production, under the brand Ritzbury, importing a chocolate machine for individual chocolates and an enrobing plant to make chocolate coated biscuits and wafers. The chocolate production business was further expanded to include chocolate fingers following the acquisition of the Maharaja Organization's Baker's Man biscuit factory in the mid-1990s.

In 1997 CBL commenced regular exports to the United States, Canada, Australia and India and by 2000 it was also exporting its products to the UK, Sweden, the Middle East, Hong Kong, Mauritius, Fiji and the Maldives. The company also purchased the Indian business Parry's Confectionary, based in Pondicherry, establishing a 100% owned subsidiary, Ritzbury India (RI). RI commenced production of the Munchee and Ritzbury brands.

In September 2000 CBL took a 79% controlling share in Soy Foods (Lanka) Limited and their brand Lanka Soy, which, despite being the pioneer in the local soy products market, only had a 15% market share.

In 2002 the company established CBL Foods International (CBL Foods) in nearby Ranala, Homagama. CBL Foods enabled the company to establish a bakery line, producing cakes under the brand Tiara. The new factory commenced operations in 2004. CBL also shifted its chocolate manufacturing to the new plant.

Facing detrimental tariffs and poor distribution arrangements CBL dissolved Ritzbury India in 2003 and sold the manufacturing plant. However, in July 2004 CBL purchased Bakemans, based in Patiala, once the third largest biscuit manufacturer in India, with a 13% market share.

In 2004 CBL acquired a 60% stake in Cecil Food (Pvt) Limited, an organic manufacturer of dehydrated fruit products, fruit juices, desiccated coconut and cashews. In the same year CBL entered into an arrangement with Italian confectionery Ferrero SpA, to manufacture and distribute Ferrero products (such as Nutella, Tic Tac, Ferrero Rocher and Mon Chéri) in the region.

In 2014, CBL introduced their own supermarket chain Star United. As of 2014, there were 30 franchised supermarkets within the country.

In 2017 the company acquired a franchise license to operate the Spar brand in Sri Lanka as Spar Lanka. This is a joint venture between Ceylon Biscuits Limited and SPAR Group Ltd South Africa. They opened the first supermarket in Thalawathugoda, Colombo. The future plan is to open 50 outlets in the country by 2023.

At present this is one of the leading biscuit, chocolate and confectionery manufacturers and marketers in Asia.

== Competition ==
Ritzbury originally started in 1991 as number four in Sri Lanka's chocolate market. By 2006 it had beaten Kandos (Ceylon Chocolates) to the number two spot, with a 21% market share (although still behind, market leader, Edna Group's 42% share). In 2010 it had become Sri Lanka's number one chocolate producer, with a 47.2% market share. By 2013 its total share of the market had grown to 55%.

When CBL purchased Lanka Soy it had only a 15% market share; by 2002 it had reached 25% and by 2003 it was 30% and the market leader.

== See also ==
- Marie biscuit
- Maliban Biscuit Manufactories Limited
