= Sri Lanka Institute of Development Administration =

Public policy institute in Colombo, Sri Lanka

- Established: 1982; 43 years ago
- Mission: Developing and improving public service administration in Sri Lanka
- Director general: Wasantha Perera
- Key people: J.J. Rathnasiri; Chairman, Governing Council
- Owner: Government of Sri Lanka
- Formerly called: Academy of Administrative Studies
- Location: 28/10 Malalasekara mawatha, Colombo 00700, Sri Lanka
- Coordinates: 6.898965°N 79.871755°E
- Website: slida.lk

The Sri Lanka Institute of Development Administration (Sinhala: ශ්‍රී ලංකා සංවර්ධන පරිපාලන ආයතනය; Tamil: அபிவிருத்தி இலங்கை நிர்வாக நிறுவனம்) (also known as SLIDA) is a research and training institute focusing on public policy and public administration in Sri Lanka. It is operated as a government-operated company through the Ministry of Public Administration and Management and is located in Colombo.

== History ==
The training and development of the Sri Lankan civil service before 1966 came under the purview of the Organization and Methods Division of the Treasury. The 1961 Wilmot A. Perera commission (also known as the 1st Salaries and Cadres Commission) and 1965 Committee for Administrative Reforms both made recommendations that led to the establishment of a dedicated government institute for the purpose in 1966- the Academy of Administrative Studies at Glen Aber Place, Kollupitiya.

The Academy was renamed the Sri Lanka Institute of Development Administration in 1979, and was incorporated as a state-owned company through the Sri Lanka Institute Of Development Administration Act, No. 9 of 1982.

=== Directors general ===
Director general	Term
Academy of Administrative Studies
H.S. Wanasinghe	1966 – 1971
B.H. de Zoysa	1971 – 1972
Eric. J. de. Silva	1972 – 1973
Raja. G. Gomez	1973 – 1975
V.C.B. Unantenne	1975 – 1979
Sri Lanka Institute of Development Administration
V. T. Navaratne	1979 – 1987
Eric. J de Silva	4 November 1988 – 12 November 1990
M. Somasunderam	2 October 1991 – 11 September 1995
P. B. Wanninayake	12 September 1995 – 15 January 1997
Dixon Nilaweera	15 January 1997 – 31 September 1997
A. S. Gunawardena	1 October 1997 – 30 May 1998
Sanath J. Ediriweera	1 June 1998 – 20 July 2001
S. Ranugge	23 July 2001 – 20 December 2001
T.M.K.B. Tennakoon	7 February 2002 – 12 November 2007
W.M. Bandusena	1 August 2008 – 10 January 2010
B. Wijayaratne	11 January 2010 – 31 December 2013
J. Dadallage	2 January 2014 – 19 January 2015
Wasantha Deshapriya	9 February 2015 – 11 September 2015
M. Thilakasiri	18 September 2015 – 15 December 2016
Wasantha Perera	19 December 2016 – 28.09.2018

== SLIDA ==
The institute's main purpose is to train public service officers of the Sri Lanka Administrative Service, Sri Lanka Overseas Service and other government agencies. SLIDA is governed by an 11-member Governing Council under the direction of the Ministry of Public Administration and Management, and engages in postgraduate education (via a Master of Public Management), consultancy services and research, and offers training programs that includes diploma-level studies.
