= Economy of Sri Lanka =

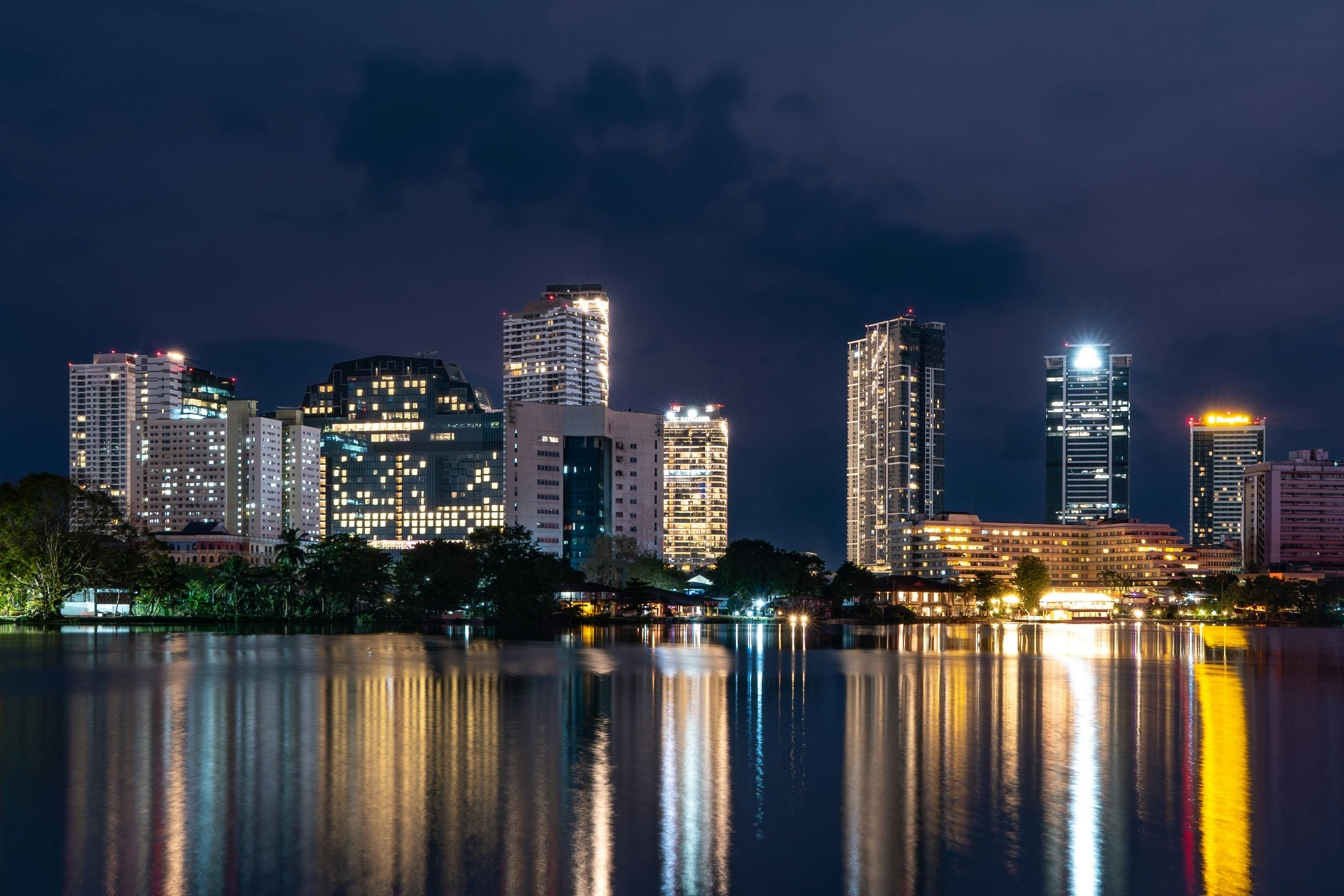
- Colombo, the financial centre of Sri Lanka
- Currency: Sri Lankan rupee (LKR, Rs)
- Fiscal year: Calendar year
- Trade organisations: WTO, WCO, SAFTA, IOR-ARC, BIMSTEC, AIIB
- Country group: Developing/Emerging; Upper-middle income economy

Statistics
- Population: ▲21,756,000 (2025)
- GDP: ▲$110.68 billion (nominal, 2026 est); ▲$398.95 billion (PPP, 2026 est)
- GDP rank: 75th (nominal, 2026 est); 60th (PPP, 2026 est)
- GDP growth: ▲5.0% (FY2025); ▲4.2% (Q2 2026); ▲4.0% (2026 est)
- GDP per capita: ▲$5,062 (nominal, 2026 est); ▲$18,250 (PPP, 2026 est)
- GDP per capita rank: 122nd (nominal,2026 est); 106th (PPP, 2026 est)
- GDP per capita growth: ▲5.7% (2025)
- GDP by sector: Agriculture: 8.4%; Industry: 25.4%; Services: 54.6%; (2025)
- Inflation (CPI): ▲5.5% (May 2026)
- Population below national poverty line: 12% lived on less than $4.20/day (2019) 53% lived on less than $8.30/day (2019)
- Human Development Index: ▼0.776 high (2023) 89th; 0.630 medium (IHDI)
- Corruption Perceptions Index: ▲35 out of 100 points (2025, 107th rank)
- Labour force: ▲8.554 million (2025 est); ▲49.4% participation rate (2025 est)
- Labour force by occupation: agriculture: 26.4%; industry: 25.4%; services: 48.3%; (2024-3Q)
- Unemployment: 4.7% (2023); ▼4.4% (2024); ▼3.9% (2025)
- Main industries: textiles & clothing, tourism, telecommunications, information technology services, banking, shipping, petroleum refining, construction and processing of tea, rubber, coconuts, tobacco and other agricultural commodities

External
- Exports: ▲$17.2 billion (2025)
- Export goods: textiles and apparel, tea and spices, IT services, rubber manufactures, Electrical and Electronic Equipment, Fish, Seafood and Aquatic Products, Gems and Jewellery, Processed food and fruits
- Main export partners: USA 22.80%; UK 9.0%; India 7.20%; Germany 5.70%; Italy 5.30%; (2025)
- Imports: ▲$21.480 billion (2025)
- Import goods: Mineral fuels including petroleum product (12.3%); Machinery including computers (9%); Electrical machinery, equipment Vehicles (7.1%); Textile fabric (5%); Plastics (3.7%); Cotton (3.3%); Heavy metals (3%); Ships and boats (2.8%); Iron, steel, aluminium (2.8%)
- Main import partners: India 23.0%; China 17.0%; UAE 10.0%; Japan 7.0%; Singapore 6.0%; (2025)
- FDI stock: ▲US$16.556 Billion (2024); ▲ Abroad: US$1.6 Billion (2024)
- Current account: ▲$1.719 Billion (2025); ▲ +1.6% of GDP
- Gross external debt: ▼$37.6 Billion (34.6% of GDP) (2025)

Public finance
- Government debt: ▼$99.6 Billion (91.6% of GDP)(2025)
- Foreign reserves: ▲$7.2 billion (February 2026)
- Budget balance: − 5.1% (of GDP) (2026)
- Revenue: Rs 5,305 Billion (2026 est)
- Spending: Rs 8,980 Billion (2026)
- Credit rating: Standard & Poor's; CCC+/C; Outlook: Stable; Moody's: Caa1; Outlook: Stable; Fitch: B− (Domestic/Foreign); B− (Country ceiling); Outlook: Stable
- All values, unless otherwise stated, are in US dollars.

Sri Lanka has a developing mixed economy. It was valued at LKR 32.7 trillion (around US$109 billion) in 2025 by gross domestic product (GDP) and $371.27 billion by purchasing power parity (PPP). Sri Lanka's economy has experienced a strong recovery in recent years, driven by rising domestic consumption, increased investment and improved performance in the industry and services sectors. GDP growth remained strong, recording 5.0% in both 2024 and 2025, with both years performing above earlier expectations. This recovery follows a period of severe economic difficulties between 2018 and 2022, including the COVID-19 pandemic, foreign exchange shortages and the 2022 economic crisis.

Sri Lanka has met the Millennium Development Goal (MDG) target of halving extreme poverty and is on track to meet most of the other MDGs, outperforming many other South Asian countries. Sri Lanka's poverty headcount index was 4.1% by 2016. Since the end of the three-decade-long Sri Lankan Civil War, Sri Lanka has begun focusing on long-term strategic and structural development challenges and has financed several infrastructure projects. The nation experienced a sovereign debt default in 2022 amid unsustainable external obligations and severe macroeconomic imbalances, rebounding in 2024 with support from the IMF.

== Overview ==
Services accounted for 58.2% of Sri Lanka's economy in 2019 up from 54.6% in 2010, industry 27.4% up from 26.4% a decade earlier and agriculture 7.4%. Though there is a competitive export agricultural sector, technological advances have been slow to enter the protected domestic sector. Sri Lanka is the largest solid and industrial tyres manufacturing centre in the world and has an apparel sector which is moving up the value chain. But rising trade protection over the past decade has also caused concern over the resurgence of inward-looking policies.

In services, ports and airports generate income for the country's newfound status as a shipping and aviation hub. Port of Colombo is the largest transhipment hub in South Asia. There is a growing software and information technology sector, which is competitive and is open to global competition. Sri Lanka's top export destinations are the United States, United Kingdom and India. China, India and the UAE are the main import partners.

With the onset of the COVID-19 pandemic, lingering concerns over Sri Lanka's slowing growth, money printing and government debt has spilled over into a series of sovereign rating downgrades. Import controls and import substitution have intensified after heightened monetary instability coming from debt monetization. Sri Lanka has been named among the top 10 countries in the world in its handling of the COVID-19 pandemic. In 2021, the Sri Lankan Government officially declared the worst economic crisis in the country in 73 years. Sri Lanka said most foreign debt repayments had been suspended from April 12, after two years of money printing to support tax cuts, ending an unblemished record of debt service. Sri Lanka started to recover after the central bank hiked rates and monetary stability returned and by 2025 per capita GDP had risen back to US $5003 from $3464.

== Economic history ==
=== Early history ===
Sri Lanka has a long history as a trading hub as a result of being located at the centre of east–west trade and irrigated agriculture in the hinterland, which is known from historical texts surviving within the island and from accounts of foreign travellers. The island has irrigation reservoirs called tanks built by ancient Kings starting after Indo-Aryan migration, many of which survive to this day. They form part of an irrigation system interlinked with more modern constructions.

Faxian (pronounced Fa Hsien), a Chinese Monk who travelled to India and Sri Lanka around 400 AD, writes of existing legends at his time of merchants from other countries trading with native tribal peoples in the island before Indo-Aryan settlement. "The country which originally had no human inhabitants but was occupied by spirits and nagas (serpent worshipers) with which merchants of various countries carried on a trade," Faxian wrote in 'A Record of Buddhistic Kingdoms'. He writes of precious stones and pearl fisheries with a 30% tax by the king.

The monk had embarked "in a large merchant vessel" from India to arrive in the island. To go back to China he "took passage in a large merchantman on board which were more than 200 men", ran into a storm where the merchants were forced to throw part of the cargo overboard and arrived at Java-dvipa (Indonesia), showing Sri Lanka had active coastal and long-distance maritime trade links.

Cosmas Indicopleustes (Indian Voyager), a merchant/monk from Alexandria of Egypt, who visited the Indian sub-continent in the 6th century, wrote in detail about Sri Lanka as a centre of commerce, referring to the island as Taprobane and Sieladiba.

"The island being, as it is, in a central position, is much frequented by ships from all parts of India and from Persia and Ethiopia, and it likewise sends out many of its own," he wrote in Christian Topography. "And from the remotest countries, I mean Tzinista [China] and other trading places, it receives silk, aloes, cloves, sandalwood and other products, and these again are passed on to marts on this side, such as Male [Malabar or South West Indian coast] ... and to Calliana [Kalyana]... This same Sielediba then, placed as one may say, in the centre of the Indies and possessing the hyacinth [sapphire] receives ... and in turn exports to them, and is thus itself a great seat of commerce."

=== Independence to 1977 ===
Sri Lanka was ahead of many Asian nations and had economic and social indicators comparable to Japan when they gained independence from the British in 1948.

Sri Lanka's social indicators were considered "exceptionally high". Literacy was already 21.7% by the late 19th century. A Malaria eradication policy of 1946 had cut the death rate from 20 per thousand in 1946 to 14 by 1947. Life expectancy at birth of a Sri Lankan in 1948 at 54 years was just under Japan's 57.5 years. Sri Lanka's infant mortality rate in 1950 was 82 deaths per thousand live births, Malaysia 91 and Philippines 102.

With its strategic location in the Indian Ocean, Sri Lanka was expected to have a better chance than most other Asian neighbours to register a rapid economic take-off and had "appeared to be one of the most promising new nations." But the optimism in 1948 had dimmed by 1960, due to wrong economic policies and mismanagement.

East Asia was gradually overtaking Sri Lanka. In 1950 Sri Lanka's un-adjusted school enrolment ratio as a share of the 5-19 year age group was 54%, India 19%, Korea 43% and the Philippines 59%. But by 1979 Sri Lanka's school enrollment rate was 74%, but the Philippines had improved to 85% and Korea was 94%.

Sri Lanka had inherited a stable macro-economy at independence. A central bank was set up and Sri Lanka became a member of the IMF entering the Bretton Woods system of currency pegs on August 29, 1950. By 1953 exchange controls were tightened with a new law.

The economy was then progressively controlled and relaxed in response to foreign exchange crises as monetary and fiscal policies deteriorated. Controls and restrictions in 1961-64 were followed by partial liberalization in 1965–70. Controls were continued after a devaluation in the wake of 1967 Sterling Crisis. Controls were tightened from 1970 to 1977 alongside the collapse of the Bretton Woods system. "In sum it was a story of tightening partial relaxing, and again tightening the trade regime and associated areas to over a perceived foreign exchange crisis," writes economist Saman Kelegama in 'Development in Independent Sri Lanka what went wrong'. "In the early 1960s strategy for dealing with the foreign exchange crisis was the gradual isolation of the economy from external market forces. It was the beginning of a standard import-substitution industrial regime with all the controls and restrictions associated with such a regime. Expropriation and state intervention in economic activities was common."

In 1960, Sri Lanka's (then Ceylon) per capita GDP was 152 dollars, Korea 153, Malaysia 280, Thailand 95, Indonesia 62, Philippines 254, Taiwan 149. But by 1978 Sri Lanka's per capita GDP was 226, Malaysia's 588, Indonesia's 370 and Taiwan's 505.

The 1970s also saw an uprising in the south from the JVP insurrection, and the roots of a civil war in the North and the East.

=== Post 1977 period ===
In 1977, Colombo abandoned statist economic policies and its import substitution industrialisation policy for market-oriented policies and export-oriented trade. Sri Lanka would after that be known to handle dynamic industries such as food processing, textiles and apparel, food and beverages, telecommunications, and insurance and banking. In the 1970s, the share of the middle class increased.

Between 1977 and 1994, the country came under UNP rule in which under President J.R Jayawardana Sri Lanka began to shift away from a socialist orientation in 1977. Since then, the government has been deregulating, privatizing, and opening the economy to international competition. In 2001, Sri Lanka faced bankruptcy, with debt reaching 101% of GDP. The impending currency crisis was averted after the country reached a hasty ceasefire agreement with the LTTE and brokered substantial foreign loans. After 2004 the UPFA government has concentrated on the mass production of goods for domestic consumption such as rice, grain and other agricultural products. however twenty-five years of civil war slowed economic growth, diversification and liberalisation, and the political group Janatha Vimukthi Peramuna (JVP) uprisings, especially the second in the early 1980s, also caused extensive upheavals.

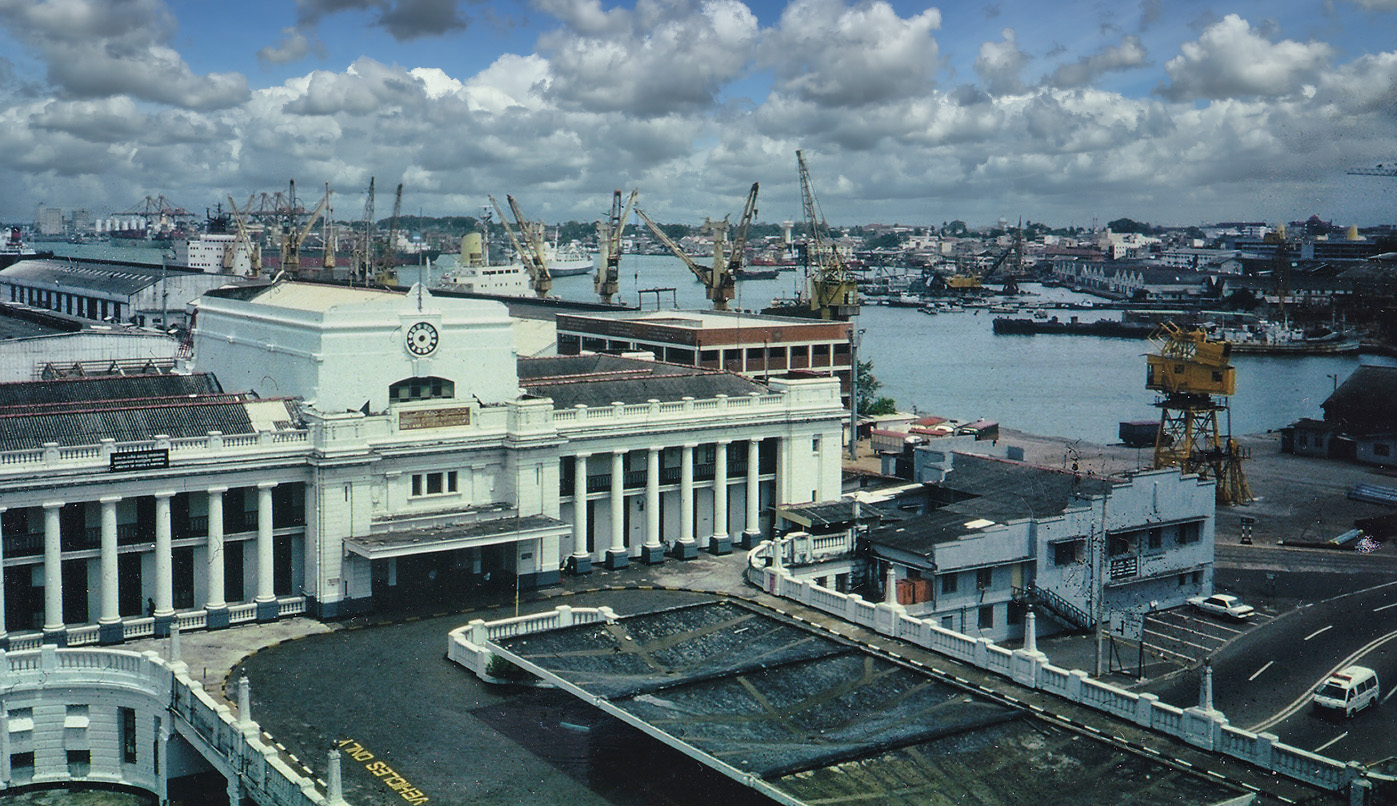
Colombo Harbour in 1992

Following the quelling of the JVP insurrection, increased privatization, economic reform and the stress on export-oriented growth helped improve economic performance, increasing GDP growth to 7% in 1993. By 1996 plantation crops made up only 20% of exports (compared with 93% in 1970), while textiles and garments accounted for 63%. GDP grew at an annual average rate of 5.5% throughout the 1990s until a drought and a deteriorating security situation lowered growth to 3.8% in 1996.

The economy rebounded in 1997–98 with a growth of 6.4% and 4.7% – but slowed to 3.7% in 1999. For the next round of reforms, the central bank of Sri Lanka recommends that Colombo expand market mechanisms in nonplantation agriculture, dismantle the government's monopoly on wheat imports, and promote more competition in the financial sector. Economic growth has been uneven in the ensuing years as the economy faced a multitude of global and domestic economic and political challenges. Overall, average annual GDP growth was 5.2% over 1991–2000.

In 2001, however, GDP growth was negative 1.4% – the first contraction since independence. The economy was hit by a series of global and domestic economic problems and was affected by terrorist attacks in Sri Lanka and the United States. The crises also exposed the fundamental policy failures and structural imbalances in the economy and the need for reforms. The year ended in parliamentary elections in December, which saw the election of United National Party to Parliament, while Sri Lanka Freedom Party retained the presidency.

During the short-lived peace process from 2002 to 2004, the economy benefited from lower interest rates, a recovery in domestic demand, increased tourist arrivals, a revival of the stock exchange, and increased foreign direct investment (FDI). In 2002, the economy experienced a gradual recovery. During this period Sri Lanka has been able to reduce defense expenditures and begin to focus on getting its large, public sector debt under control. In 2002, economic growth reached 4%, aided by strong service sector growth. The agricultural sector of the economy staged a partial recovery. Total FDI inflows during 2002 were about $246 million.

The Mahinda Rajapakse government halted the privatization process and launched several new companies as well as re-nationalising previous state-owned enterprises, one of which the courts declared that privatization is null and void. Some state-owned corporations became overstaffed and less efficient, making huge losses with series of frauds being uncovered in them and nepotism rising. During this time, the EU revoked GSP plus preferential tariffs from Sri Lanka due to alleged human rights violations, which cost about US$500 million a year.

The resumption of the civil war in 2005 led to a steep increase in defence expenditures. The increased violence and lawlessness also prompted some donor countries to cut back on aid to the country.

=== Post-civil war period ===
Pre-2009, there was a continuing cloud over the economy with the civil war and fighting between the Government of Sri Lanka and the LTTE; however, the war ended with a resounding victory for the Sri Lankan Government on 19 May 2009 with the total elimination of the LTTE.

As the civil war ended in May 2009, the economy started to grow at a higher rate of 8.0% in the year 2010 and reached 9.1% in 2012, mostly due to the boom in non-tradable sectors; however, the boom did not last and the GDP growth for 2013 fell to 3.4% in 2013, and only slightly recovered to 4.5% in 2014.

According to government policies and economic reforms stated by Prime Minister Ranil Wickremesinghe, Sri Lanka plans to create Western Region Megapolis a Megapolis in the western province to promote economic growth. The creation of several business and technology development areas island-wide specialised in various sectors, as well as tourism zones, are also being planned.

In the mid to late 2010s, Sri Lanka faced a danger of falling into economic malaise, with increasing debt levels and a political crisis which saw the country's debt rating being dropped. In 2016 the government succeeded in lifting an EU ban on Sri Lankan fish products which resulted in fish exports to EU rising by 200% and in 2017 improving human rights conditions resulted in the European Commission proposing to restore GSP plus facility to Sri Lanka. Sri Lanka's tax revenues per GDP also increased from 10% in 2014, which was the lowest in nearly two decades to 12.3% in 2015. Despite reforms, Sri Lanka was listed among countries with the highest risk for investors by Bloomberg. Growth also further slowed to 3.3% in 2018 and 2.3% in 2019. The rupee fell from 131 to the US dollar to 182 from 2015 to 2019, inflating foreign debt and slowing domestic consumption ending a period of relative stability. China became a top creditor to Sri Lanka over the last decade, overtaking Japan and the World Bank.

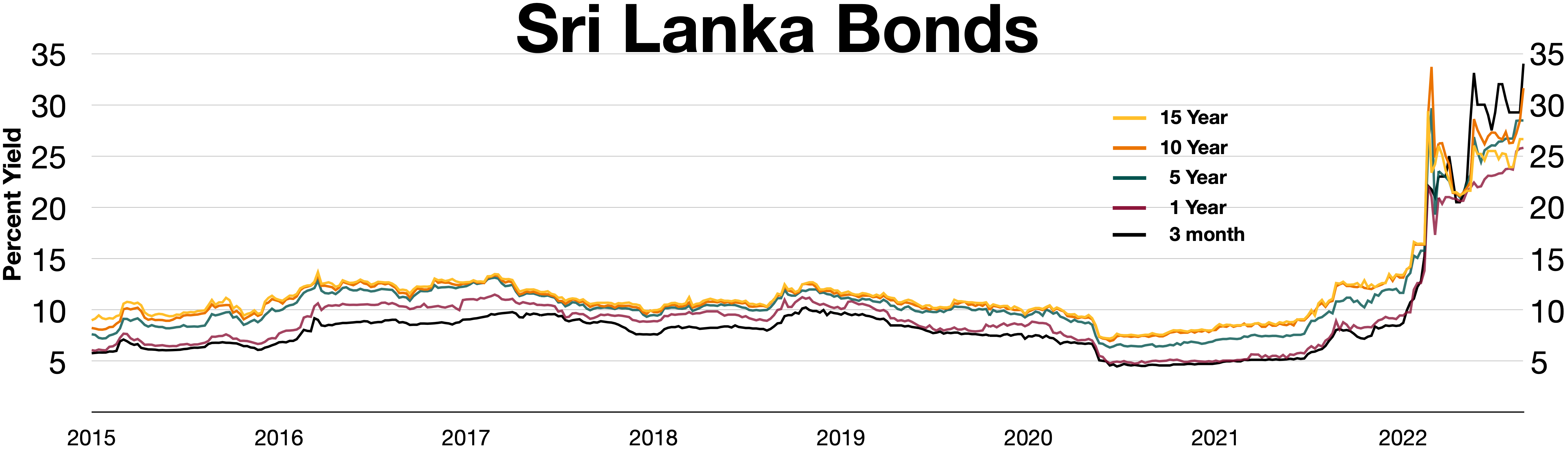
Sri Lanka bonds spiked in 2022 Inverted yield curve in the first half of 2022 15 year bonds 10 year bonds 5 year bonds 1 year bonds 6 month bonds

The main economic sectors of the country are tourism, tea export, apparel, textile, rice production and other agricultural products. In addition to these economic sectors, overseas employment contributes highly to foreign exchange.

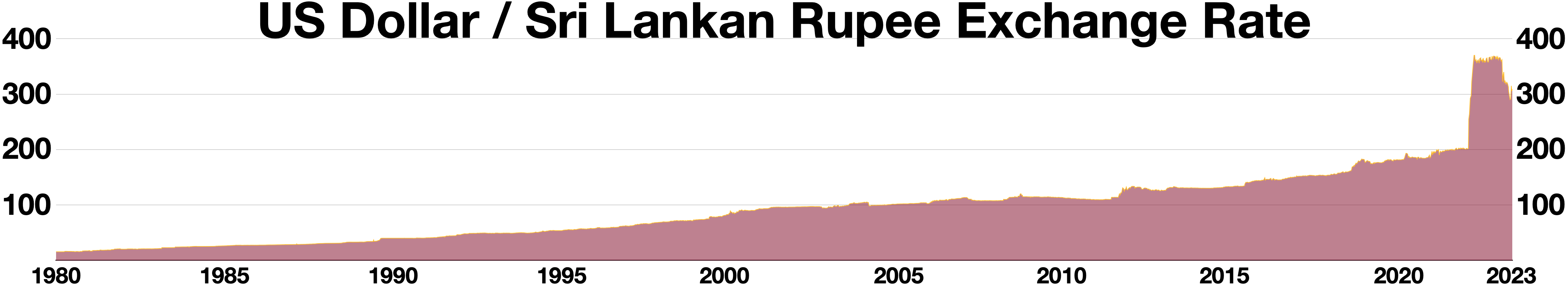
USD / Sri Lankan Rupee exchange rate. In early March 2022, the Sri Lankan Rupee began losing value quickly.

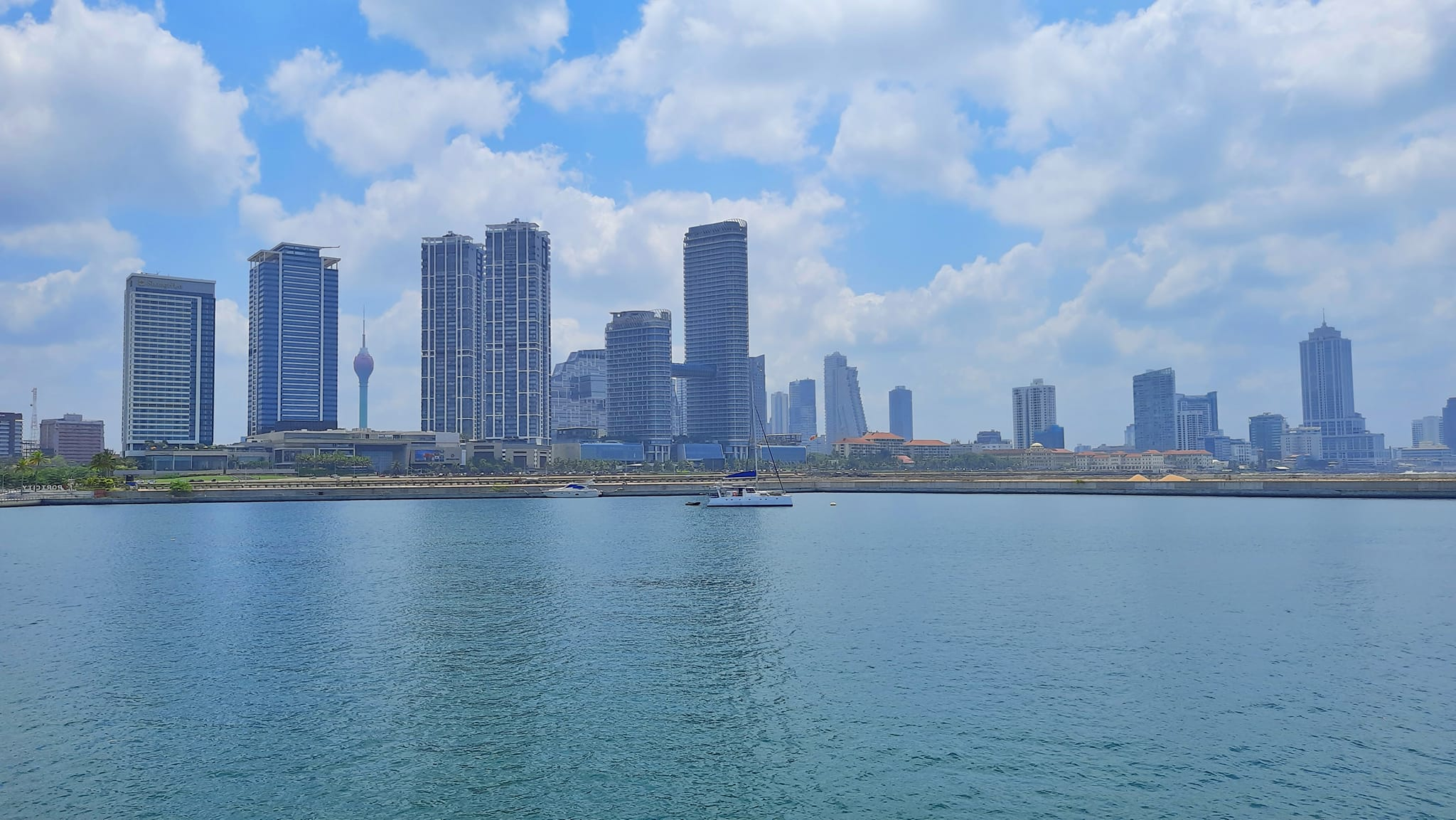
Colombo skyline in 2024

After aggressive macroeconomic policy involving tax cuts and money printing Sri Lanka started to experience severe foreign exchange shortages, resulting in food shortages and difficulties in repaying debt.

=== Post COVID-19 sovereign debt crisis and new reforms (2021–present) ===
Sri Lanka declared a 'pre-emptive negotiated default' saying most foreign debt would not be repaid from April 12. Fitch Ratings downgraded Sri Lanka to 'C' from 'CC' and said the country would be further downgraded to restricted default (RD) once the first payment was missed. Standard and Poor's downgraded the sovereign rating to 'CC' and said the country would be downgraded to selective default (SD) after a payment was missed.

Sri Lanka entered an IMF program in 2022 and fiscal tightening, including subsidy cuts, tax reforms and monetary stabilization, which helped moderate inflation sharply from nearly 70% in late 2022 to low single digits by 2024 and beyond. Sri Lanka completed debt restructuring and was removed from default status, but rating agencies are warning on external weaknesses despite better state finances.. Growth resumed to around 5% and per capita income has bounced back to US$5003. In 2026, growth prospects continue but face global risks and domestic structural challenges, with ongoing emphasis on reforms to attract investment, boost exports and ensure inclusive recovery.

== Macroeconomic trends ==
The chart below summarizes the trend of Sri Lanka's gross domestic product at market prices by the International Monetary Fund with figures in millions of Sri Lankan Rupees.

Year	Gross Domestic Product	No. of Sri Lankan Rupees in $1 US
1980	66,167	16.53
1985	162,375	27.20
1990	321,784	40.06
1995	667,772	51.25
2000	1,257,637	77.00
2005	2,363,669	100.52
2016	6,718,000	145.00
2020	14,601,600	189.00
2024	29,905,600	302.12

For purchasing power parity comparisons, the US Dollar is exchanged at 113.4 Sri Lankan Rupees only.

The following table shows the main economic indicators from 1980 to 2024. Inflation below 5% is in green.

Year	GDP (PPP, in US$ bil.)	GDP per capita (PPP)	GDP growth (real)	Inflation (in percent)	Government debt (Percentage of GDP)				
Year	1990	75	GDP growth (real)	Inflation (in percent)	Government debt (Percentage of GDP)	4562	▲6.4%	▲21.5%	▲97%
1995	▲97	▲5523	▲5.5%	▲7.7%	▼95%				
2000	▲124	▲6429	▲8.4%	▲6.2%	▲97%				
2005	▲151	▲7453	▲6.0%	▲11.6%	▼91%				
2010	▲205	▲9832	▲8.0%	▲6.2%	▼69%				
2011	▲223	▲10618	▲8.7%	▲6.7%	69%				
2012	▲242	▲11448	▲8.6%	▲7.5%	▼67%				
2013	▲252	▲12250	▲4.1%	▲6.9%	▲68%				
2014	▲268	▲12910	▲6.4%	▲3.2%	▲69%				
2015	▲280	▲13330	▲4.2%	▲3.8%	▲74%				
2016	▲294	▲13846	▲5.1%	▲4.0%	▼n/a				
2017	▲313	▲14572	▲6.5%	▲7.7%	n/a				
2018	▲320	▲14760	▲2.3%	▲2.1%	n/a				
2019	▼319	▼14637	▼–0.2%	▲3.5%	n/a				
2020	▼304	▼13887	▼–4.6%	▲6.2%	n/a				
2021	▲317	▲14316	▲4.2%	▲7%	n/a				
2022	▼294	▼13249	▼–7.3%	▲49.7%	n/a				
2023	▼287	▼13025	▼–2.3%	▲16.5%	n/a				
2024	▲301	▲13753	▲5%	▲–0.4%	n/a				

== Economic sectors ==
=== Tourism ===
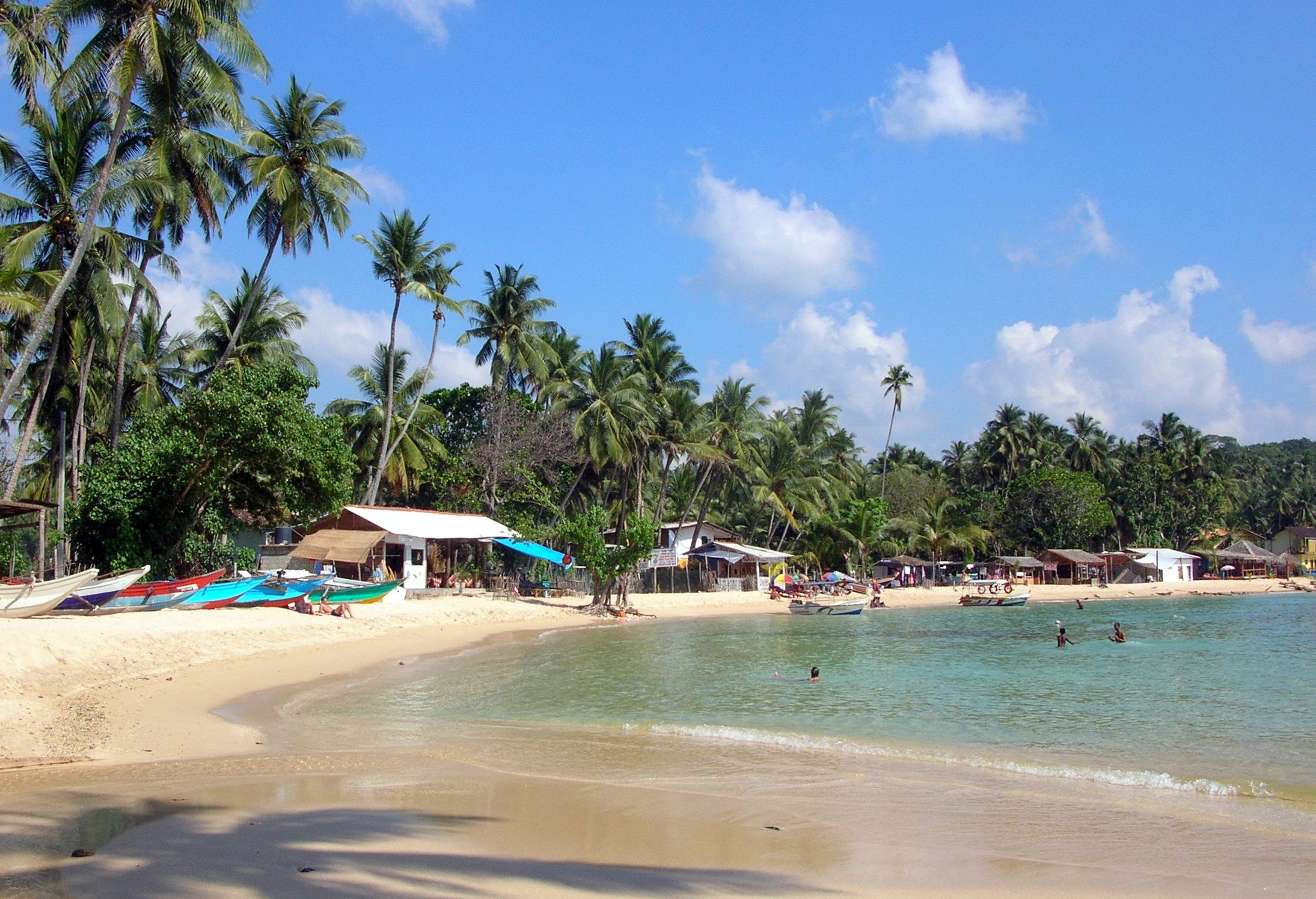
Unawatuna Beach

Tourism is one of the main industries in Sri Lanka. Major tourist attractions are focused around the island's famous beaches located in the southern and the eastern parts of the country and ancient heritage sites located in the interior of the country and resorts located in the mountainous regions of the country. Also, due to precious stones such as rubies and sapphires being frequently found and mined in Ratnapura and its surrounding areas, they are a major tourist attraction.

The 2004 Indian Ocean Tsunami and the past civil war have reduced the tourist arrivals, as a civil war intensified. Foreign visitors fell from 566,202 in 2004 during a ceasefire with Tamil Tiger separatists to 447,890 by the end of the war in 2009. From then arrivals grew rapidly to 2,333,796 in 2019. The 2019 Easter Sunday bombings reduced arrivals to 1,913,702 though authorities acted quickly to round up the group and travel advisories were relaxed by key generating markets such as the UK as early as June 2019. Lonely Planet named Sri Lanka the best destination to visit in 2019 and Travel+Leisure the best island.

The COVID-19 pandemic dealt a major blow to the industry after airports were closed in March 2020. Tourism revenues were estimated to have fallen to US$956mn in 2020 from US$3.6bn in 2019 hurting over 300,000 said to be connected to the industry. The government has announced a number relief measures including a debt moratorium, which were then extended. In 2020 arrivals fell 70 percent to 507,704 from 1,913,702 in 2019, with almost all arrivals coming before airports closed in March. In December 2020, under what was called a 'pilot project' 393 package tourists came to Sri Lanka on a charter flights from Ukraine. On January 21 tourism resumed officially allowing independent travellers to also come subject to a series of health rules and Coronavirus tests.

=== Manufacturing ===
Sri Lanka's primary manufacturing industry is apparel and is responsible for 40% of merchandise export revenue and 7% of the national GDP, employing over 350,000 people and has placed Sri Lanka as a manjor source of ethical manufacturing. Sri Lanka mainly exports to the United States and Europe. There are about 900 factories throughout country serving companies such as Victoria's Secret, Liz Claiborne and Tommy Hilfiger. Textiles & Apparels, as categorized and reported by the Sri Lanka Export Development Board, made up to around 44% of Sri Lankan merchandise exports, in the year 2017.

=== Agriculture, fishing, livestock and forestry ===
The agricultural sector of the country produces mainly rice, coconut and grain, largely for domestic consumption and occasionally for export. The tea industry which has existed since 1867 is not usually regarded as part of the agricultural sector, which is mainly focused on export rather than domestic use in the country.

Sri Lanka's agricultural and agri-allied manufacturing is likely affected by climate variations. There was a flood in May 2018 followed by floods in May 2016 and May 2017.

==== Tea industry ====
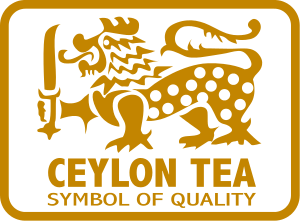
Ceylon Tea logo

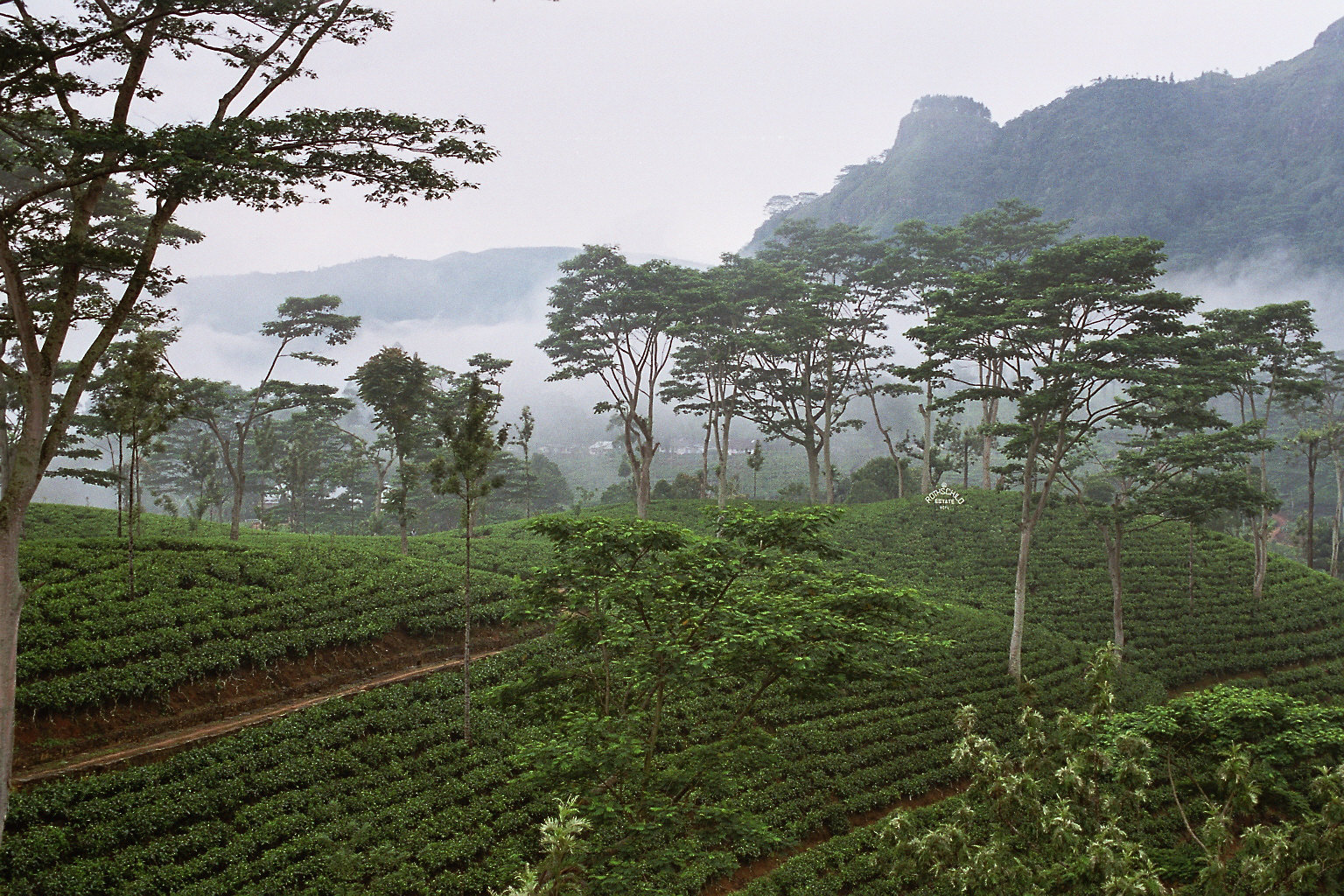
Tea estate in the central highlands

The tea industry, operating under the Ministry of Public Estate Management and Development, is one of the main industries in Sri Lanka. It became the world's leading exporter in 1995 with a 23% share of global tea export, higher than Kenya's 22% share. The central highlands of the country have a low-temperature climate throughout the year and annual rainfall and humidity levels that are suitable for growing tea. The industry was introduced to the country in 1867 by James Taylor, a British planter who arrived in 1852.

Recently, Sri Lanka has become one of the countries exporting fair trade tea to the UK and other countries. It is believed that such projects could reduce rural poverty.

==== Transition to biological agriculture ====
In June 2021, Sri Lanka started the first 100% organic farming or biological agriculture program and imposed a countrywide ban on inorganic fertilizers and pesticides. The program was welcomed by its advisor Vandana Shiva, but ignored critical voices from scientific and farming community who warned about possible collapse of farming, including financial crisis due to devaluation of national currency pivoted around tea industry. In the autumn of 2021 Sri Lanka experienced a massive drop in farming output by up to 50% and food shortages. The situation in the tea industry was described as critical, with farming under the organic program being described as 10x more expensive and producing half of the yield by the farmers. In September 2021 the government announced "economic emergency", as the situation was further aggravated by falling national currency exchange rate, inflation rising as result of high food prices, and pandemic restrictions in tourism which further decreased country's income. The government cancelled some of these measures, but importing urea remains banned. Sri Lanka is seeking to introduce peacetime rationing of essential goods.

In mid-October 2021 the ban was largely lifted "until the island was able to produce enough organic fertiliser". In November 2021, Sri Lanka abandoned its plan to become the world's first organic farming nation following rising food prices and weeks of protests against the plan. As of December 2021, the damage to the agricultural production was already done, with prices having risen substantially for vegetables in Sri Lanka, and time needed to recover from the crisis. The ban on fertilizer has been lifted for certain crops, but the price of urea has risen internationally due to the price for oil and gas. Jeevika Weerahewa, a senior lecturer at the University of Peradeniya, predicted that the ban would reduce the paddy harvest in 2022 by an unprecedented 50%.

=== Mining ===
Sri Lanka is known for producing a variety of gemstones, including chrysoberyl, corundum, garnet, ruby, spinel, and tourmaline, and is the leading producer of the Ceylon Blue sapphire. Ceylon sapphires are among the most desirable in the gemstone market and can regularly fetch thousands per carat. Contrary to popular belief Ceylon produces sapphires of all colours, including padparadscha types, though blue is the most desirable and yields the highest prices. Some of the world's largest sapphires, such as the Logan Sapphire and Blue Belle of Asia, have come from Sri Lanka.

The best-known areas for gemstone mining in Sri Lanka were Balangoda, Elahera, Kamburupitiya, Moneragala, Okkampitiya, and Ratnapura. In addition, Sri Lanka has a variety of industrial minerals, which include ball clay, kaolin, and other clays, calcite, dolomite, feldspar, graphite, limestone, Ilmenite, mica, rutile mineral sands, phosphate rock, quartz, zircon, dolomite and silica sand. Pulmoddai beach sand deposit is the most important non-ferrous mineral reserve in Sri Lanka as well as one of the world's most richest mineral sand deposits with heavy mineral concentrates of 50% to 60% and contains many minerals including titanium.

Sri Lanka is famous, especially for its highly valued and high-purity vein graphite. As of 2014, graphite was produced at the two largest graphite mines in Sri Lanka, the Bogala and the Kahatagaha Mines. Major investors in graphite mining are Graphite Lanka Ltd., Bogala Graphite Lanka Plc, Bora Bora Resources Ltd. (BBR) of Australia, MRL Corp. Ltd. of Australia, and Saint Jean Carbon Inc. of Canada.

=== IT industry ===
The export revenue from the Sri Lankan IT sector was US$1,644 million in 2025.

=== Finance and banking ===
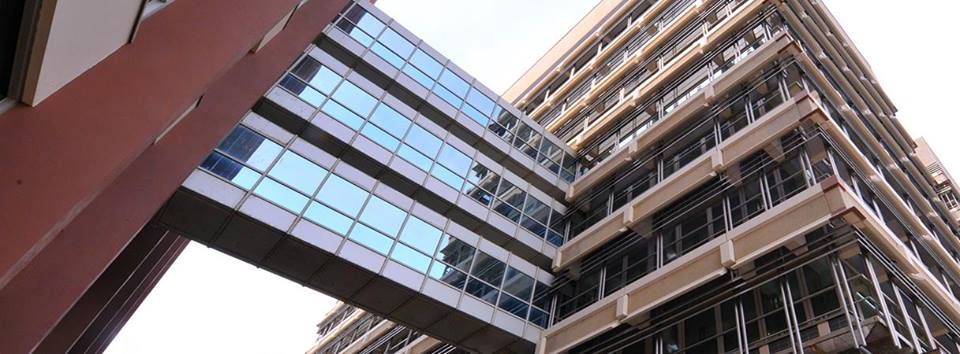
Central Bank of Sri Lanka Building

The Central Bank of Sri Lanka is the monetary authority of Sri Lanka and was established in 1950. The Central Bank is responsible for the conduct of monetary policy in the country and also has supervisory powers over the financial system.

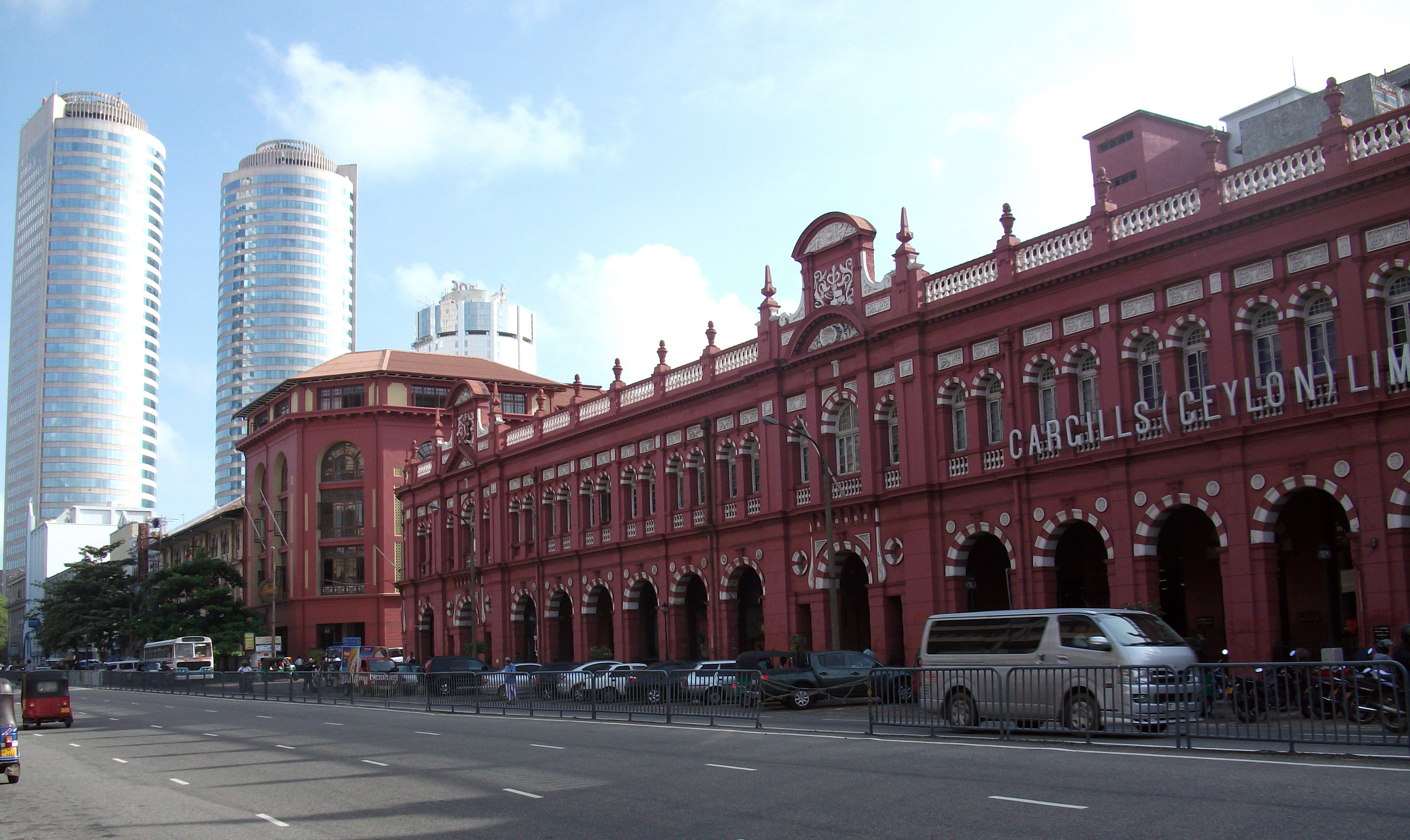
World Trade Centre Twin Towers - Colombo, home to the Colombo Stock Exchange (top left). The Cargills Ceylon Limited building is visible (right).

The Colombo Stock Exchange (CSE) is the main stock exchange in Sri Lanka. It is one of the most modern exchanges in South Asia, providing a fully automated trading platform. The vision of the CSE is to contribute to the wealth of the nation by creating value through securities. The headquarters of the CSE has been located at the World Trade Center Towers in Colombo since 1995 and it also has branches across the country in Kandy, Matara, Kurunegala, Negombo and Jaffna. In 2009, after the 30 years-long civil war came to an end, the CSE was the best performing stock exchange in the world.

=== Education ===
Education in Sri Lanka has a long history that dates back two millennia. While the Constitution of Sri Lanka does not provide free education as a fundamental right, the constitution mentions that 'the complete eradication of illiteracy and the assurance to all persons of the right to universal and equal access to education at all levels" in its section on directive principles of state policy at (27(2)(H). Sri Lanka's population had an adult literacy rate of 96.3% in 2015, which is above average by world and regional standards. (Note: In 2013, South Asia's literacy rate was 67.55%, Asia 84.32% and the world 85.20%.)

Education plays a major part in the life and culture of the country, which dates back to 543 BC. Sri Lanka's modern educational system, which is modeled after the Christian missionary system, was brought about by its integration into the British Empire in the 19th century. Education currently falls under the control of both the Central Government and the Provincial Councils, with some responsibilities lying with the Central Government and the Provincial Council having autonomy for others.

The Human Rights Measurement Initiative (HRMI) finds that Sri Lanka is fulfilling 95.5% of what it should be fulfilling for the right to education based on the country's level of income. HRMI breaks down the right to education by looking at the rights to both primary education and secondary education. While taking into consideration Sri Lanka's income level, the nation is achieving 97.7% of what should be possible based on its resources (income) for primary education and 93.3% for secondary education.

=== Healthcare ===
Development of life expectancy in Sri Lanka

Sri Lanka has a free and universal health care system. It scores higher than the regional average in healthcare having a high Life expectancy and a lower maternal and infant death rate than its neighbors. It is known for having one of the world's earliest known healthcare systems and has its own indigenous medicine system.

=== Telecommunications ===
Telecommunications in Sri Lanka commenced in 1858 after the first telegraphic circuit between Colombo and Galle was commenced. The sector continues to grow in the modern times.

== Economic infrastructure and resources ==
=== Transportation ===
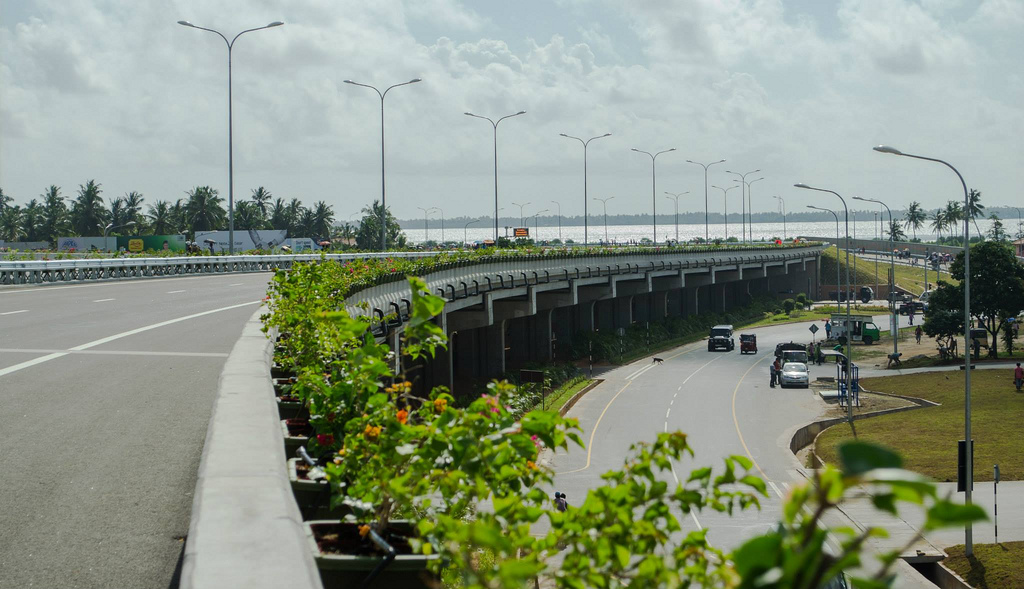
E03 expressway

Most Sri Lankan cities and towns are connected by the Sri Lanka Railways, the state-run railway operator. The Sri Lanka Transport Board is the state-run agency responsible for operating public bus services across the island.

The government has launched several highway projects to bolster the economy and national transport system, including the Colombo-Katunayake Expressway, the Colombo-Kandy (Kadugannawa) Expressway, the Colombo-Padeniya Expressway and the Outer Circular Highway to ease Colombo's traffic congestion. The government-sponsored Road Development Authority (RDA) has been involved in several large-scale projects all over the island in an attempt to improve the road network in Sri Lanka. Sri Lanka's commercial and economic centres, primarily the capitals of the nine provinces are connected by the "A-Grade" roads which are categorically organised and marked. Furthermore, "B-Grade" roads, also paved and marked, connect district capitals within provinces. The grand total of A, B and E grade roads are estimated at 12,379.49 km.

=== Energy ===
Electricity generation in Sri Lanka in terawatt-hours

The energy policy is governed by the Ministry of Power and Energy, while the production and retailing of electricity is carried out by the Ceylon Electricity Board. Policy recommendations and planning come under the oversight of the Public Utilities Commission of Sri Lanka. Energy in Sri Lanka is mostly generated by hydroelectric power stations in the Central Province.

==== Electrical sector ====
The electricity sector in Sri Lanka has a national grid which is primarily powered by hydroelectric power and thermal power, with sources such as photovoltaics and wind power in early stages of deployment. Although potential sites are being identified, other power sources such as geothermal, nuclear, solar thermal and wave power are not used in the power generation process for the national grid.

The country is expected to achieve 75% electricity generation by renewable energy by 2025.

== External sector ==
=== Trade statistics ===
Year	Totals of Merchandise & Services (in bn. US$)	
Year	Export revenue	Imports
2016	▲$13.7	▲$19.1
2017	▲$15.0	▲$20.9
2018	▲$15.9	▲$22.2
2019	▼$15.8	▼$19.9
2020	▼$12.8	▼$15.5
2021	▲$15.1	▲$20.6
2022	▼$14.8	▼$18.2
2023	▲$14.9	▼$16.8
2024	▲$16.17	▲$18.84
2025	▲$17.25	

=== Largest trading partners with Sri Lanka ===
Exports $10.3 billion (2020)

Imports $14.9 billion (2020)

Rank	Country	Exports	Imports	Total Trade	Trade Balance
1	United States	2,560	355	2,915	2,205
2	United Kingdom	793	167	960	626
3	India	668	3,220	3,888	−2,552
4	Germany	651	269	978	382
5	Italy	432	246	678	186
6	Netherlands	305	90.9	395.9	214.1
7	Belgium	285	37.7	322.7	247.3
8	China	256	3,820	4,076	−3,564
9	Canada	225	177	402	48
10	Japan	200	376	576	−176

|publisher=Fact Check |access-date=29 May 2021 |archive-date=2 June 2021 |archive-url=https://web.archive.org/web/20210602212522/http://===/ Economy ===

=== Trade account issues ===
In the recent past, the Sri Lankan Government has identified some key focal areas to address the external imbalances of the economy, especially with regard to reducing its high trade deficit (≈15% of GDP for 2012) in order to make the economy comply with the Marshall–Lerner condition. Sri Lanka's oil import bill accounts for an estimated 27% of total imports while its pro-growth policies have resulted in an investment goods import component of 24% of total imports. These inelastic import components have led to Sri Lanka's Export goods price elasticity + Import goods price elasticity totalling less than 1, resulting in the country not complying with the Marshall–Lerner condition.

Some of the suggested proposals include:

- Import substitution of investment goods and consumer goods
- Tax concessions towards value-added exports
- Negotiating longer credit periods for oil imports
- Allowing the external value of the currency to be determined by market forces (with minimal central bank intervention)

=== Capital account ===
- Within the capital account, borrowings still account for a significant proportion as opposed to Foreign direct investments
- FDIs were estimated at ~US$800mn for FY2012

=== Overall balance (BOP) ===
- The economy ended with an overall positive balance of US$151mn for 2012 (vs. a US$1,061mn deficit in FY2011)

=== Foreign investment ===
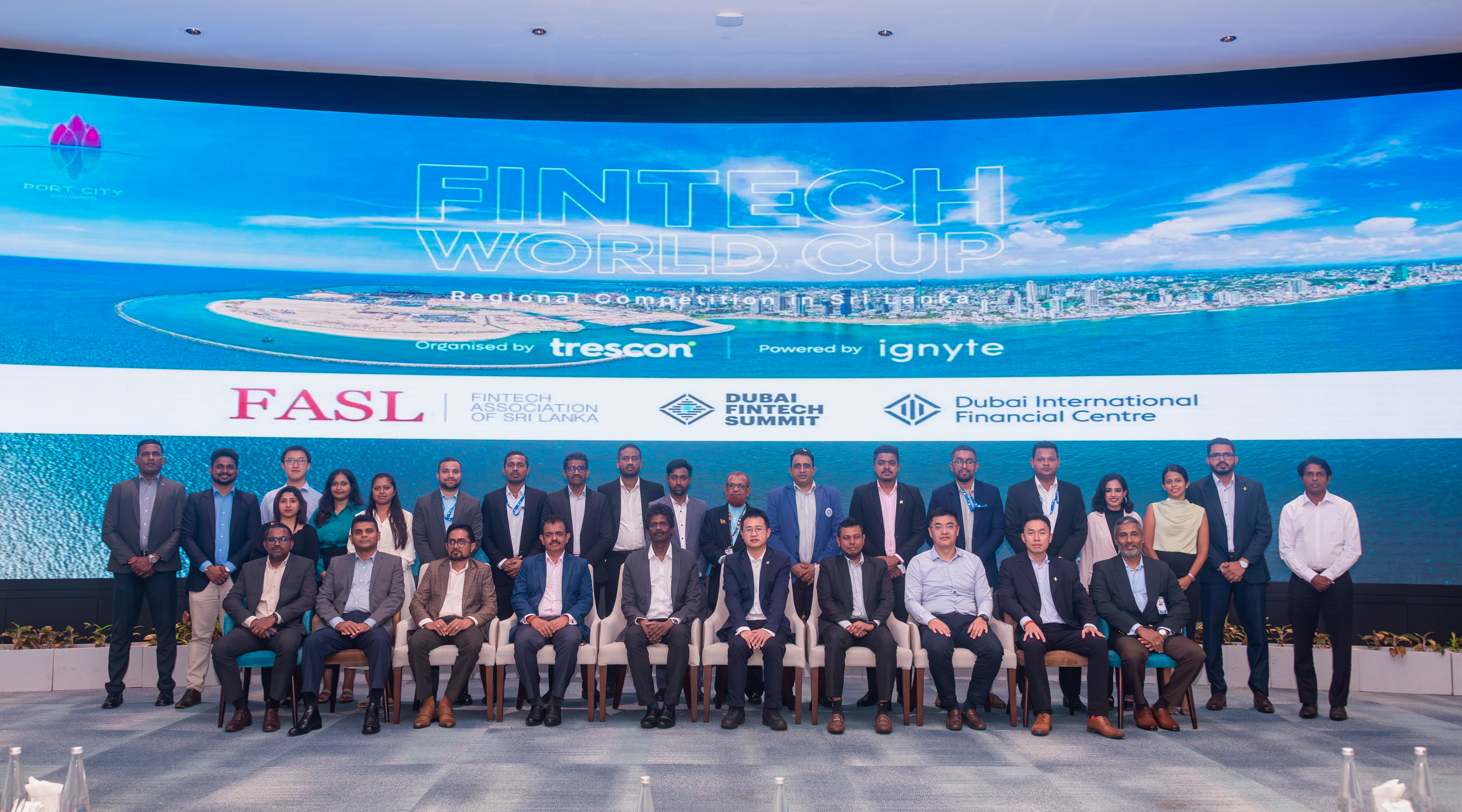
In April 2025, Port City Colombo, in partnership with the Fintech Association of Sri Lanka (FASL), hosted the Regional Competition of the FinTech World Cup at the Port City premises. The event formed part of efforts to position Port City Colombo as an emerging regional centre for financial technology and innovation.

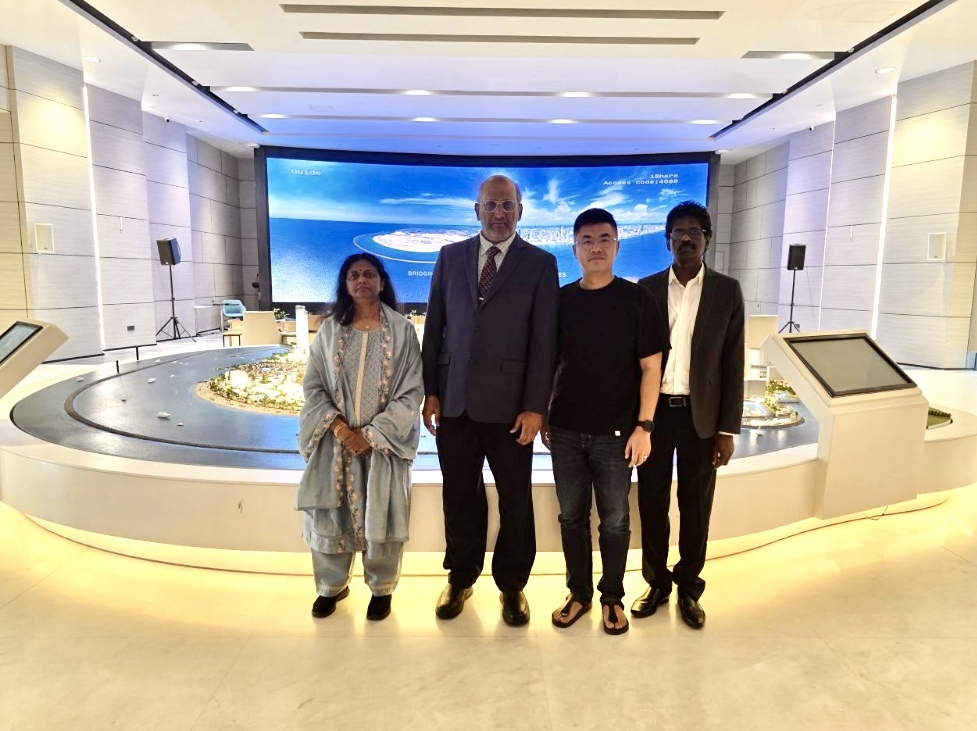
Dr. Sivaguru S. Sritharan, former provost and vice chancellor of the U.S. Air Force Institute of Technology (second from left), during a meeting with the leadership team of Port City Colombo at the site of the future Colombo International Financial Centre (CIFC) in June 2026.

Port City Colombo (Sinhala: කොළඹ වරාය නගරය, romanised: Koḷam̆ba Warāya Nagaraya) is a multi-services special economic zone located in Colombo, Sri Lanka, which is currently under construction on reclaimed land adjacent to the Galle Face Green. The land reclamation work had been completed as of January 2019. In 2017, the cost was slated to be US$ 15 billion. Port City Colombo is a multi-billion-dollar FDI-funded Public Private Partnership (PPP).

Port City Colombo aims to facilitate connections to the South Asian market through investment opportunities, international business environments, and infrastructure developments.

Upon completion, Port City Colombo will feature five distinct precincts: the Financial District, Central Park Living, Island Living, the Marina, and the International Island. The city will additionally encompass over 6.4 million square metres of new developments in residences, healthcare, education, entertainment, hotels, restaurants, retail, and commercial complexes.

In May 2021, the Parliament of Sri Lanka approved the Port City Commission Bill to establish the Colombo Port City Special Economic Zone and Economic Commission. Under this law, companies can be exempt from all taxes, personal, corporate, excise, import, and every other tax for up to forty years.

== Skilled labour force ==
Sri Lanka has a well-established education system that has successfully created a vast supply of skilled labour. Sri Lanka's population has a literacy rate of 92%, the highest literacy rate in South Asia. Information technology literacy of the urban sector population is 39.9 per cent and people around the country use web-based job boards to find skilled employment together with other sources such as newspapers and government gazette. In Sri Lanka, all persons above the age of 15 of either gender are identified as the working-age population. In the fourth quarter of 2017, Sri Lanka had an unemployment rate of 4.2 percent and is shown to reduce gradually over the years.

== Major companies ==
Sri Lanka has developed several multi-national companies and international brands. The most notable conglomerate include Cargills, John Keells Holdings, Hayleys, LOLC Holdings, and Carson Cumberbatch. The largest apparel companies are MAS Holdings and Brandix. While LAUGFS Holdings is a notable company in the energy sector. A well-known hospitality conglomerate is Aitken Spence. Dilmah is a well-known tea brand. While consumer goods brands include Ceylon Tobacco Company, Elephant House, DCSL, CBL, and Maliban.

== Global economic relations ==
Exports of Sri Lanka by product category (2019) Chemical products Transportation Machines Mineral products Plastics and rubbers Metals Foodstuffs Precious metals Textiles Instruments Animal products Vegetable products Paper goods Footwear and headwear Miscellaneous Stone and glass Wood products Animal and vegetable bi-products Animal hides Arts and antiques Weapons

Exports to the United States, Sri Lanka's most important market, were valued at $1.8 billion in 2002, or 38% of total exports. For many years, the United States has been Sri Lanka's largest market for garments, receiving more than 63% of the country's total garment exports. India is Sri Lanka's largest supplier, with imports worth $835 million in 2002. Japan, traditionally Sri Lanka's largest supplier, was its fourth-largest in 2002 with exports of $355 million. Other important suppliers include Hong Kong, Singapore, Taiwan, and South Korea. The United States is the 10th-largest supplier to Sri Lanka; US imports amounted to $218 million in 2002, according to Central Bank trade data.

A new port is being built in Hambantota in Southern Sri Lanka, funded by the Chinese government as a part of the Chinese aid to Sri Lanka. This will ease the congestion in Sri Lankan ports, particularly in Colombo. In 2009, 4456 ships visited Sri Lankan ports.

=== Trade agreements ===
FTA (Free Trade Agreements)
Effective	Under negotiation
FTA with India; FTA with Pakistan; FTA with Singapore (effective May 2018); European Union's (EU) Generalized Scheme of Preferences (GSP+); U.S. Generalized System of Preferences (GSP); South Asian Free Trade Area (SAFTA); Asia-Pacific Trade Agreement (APTA)	FTA with China; FTA with Bangladesh; FTA with Thailand

=== Foreign assistance ===
Sri Lanka is highly dependent on foreign assistance, and several high-profile assistance projects were launched in 2003. The most significant of these resulted from an aid conference in Tokyo in June 2003; pledges at the summit, which included representatives from the International Monetary Fund, World Bank, Asian Development Bank, Japan, the European Union and the United States, totalled $4.5 billion.

== See also ==
- List of companies of Sri Lanka
- List of companies listed on the Colombo Stock Exchange
- List of largest public companies in Sri Lanka
- List of Sri Lankan public corporations by market capitalisation
- Corruption in Sri Lanka
- Poverty in Sri Lanka
- Science and technology in Sri Lanka
- Squatting in Sri Lanka
- Taxation in Sri Lanka
- Economy of South Asia
