= Ranabima Royal College =

Ranabima Royal College, Kandy
- රණබිම රාජකීය විද්‍යාලය, මහනුවර ரணபிம றோயல் கல்லூரி, கன்டி

Location
- Gannoruwa; Peradeniya, Kandy District, Central Province 20400; Sri Lanka
- 7°16′45.20″N 80°35′38.20″E

Information
- Type: Public school
- Established: 2 March 1996; 30 years ago
- Founder: W. M. P. B. Dissanayake / Palitha Alkaduwa
- School district: Kandy Education Zone
- Authority: Central Provincial Council
- School number: 12503
- Principal: Malaka Perera
- Teaching staff: About 120
- Grades: 6-13
- Gender: Boys
- Age range: 10-19
- Enrollment: 1280
- Classes: 28+
- Average class size: 40 Students
- Language: Sinhala, Tamil, English
- Schedule: 7:00 - 13:30
- Colours: Blue, yellow, green
- Website: www.ranabimaroyal.lk

Location of Ranabima Royal College in Sri Lanka map

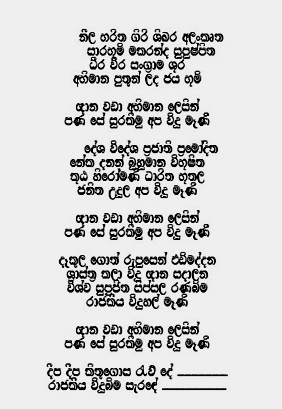
The College Anthem

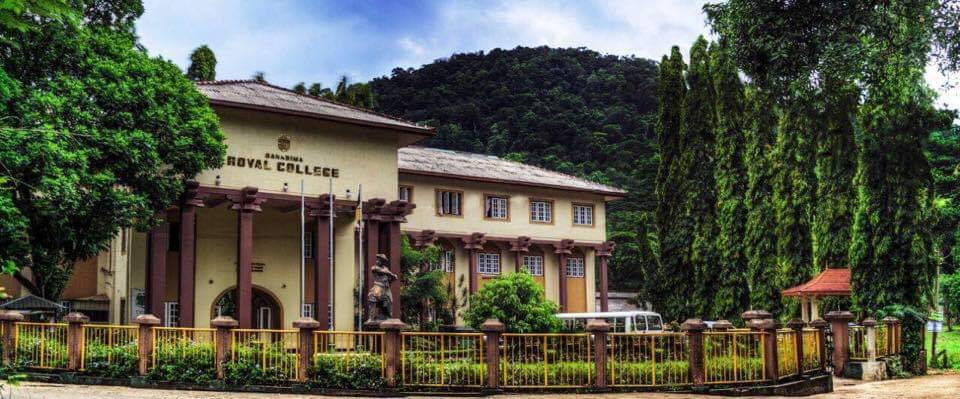
Front View Of The College

Ranabima Royal College (Sinhala: රණබිම රාජකීය විද්‍යාලය) also known as Royal College, Ranabima is a provincial school in Gannoruwa near Kandy, Sri Lanka. The school is surrounded by Gannoruwa and Hanthana Mountains, and is situated on the bank of the Mahaweli river. Dividos sanctuary is located just beside the school, as are the Royal Botanical Gardens and University of Peradeniya. The agricultural research facilities of the Department of Agriculture are also located beside the school. The school is approximately 2 km (1.2 mi) from Peradeniya via the New Colombo–Kandy highway and approximately 6 km (3.7 mi) from the centre of Kandy.

== History ==
First academic staff of the college

Ranabima Royal College was founded by W. M. P. B. Dissanayake, former Chief Minister of Central Province, and Palitha Elkaduwa, former Secretary of the Department of Education, Central Province. The school was officially opened by Central Provincial Governor Stanley Thilakarathne on 2 March 1996, the day of commemoration of the signing of the Kandyan Convention. The school's first principal was S. M. Keerthirathne and it had 16 academic staff. Their school initially had 320 students - 240 on Sinhala medium students and 80 on Tamil medium. The school's students first sat for the ordinary level and advanced level examinations in 2000 and 2003 respectively.

The land upon which the school is built on has its own historical connections. In 1638, the historic Battle of Gannoruwa was fought between the Portuguese and the Sinhala forces under King Rajasinha II and Prince Vijayapala on this land. The Battle of Gannoruwa, which ended in victory for the Sinhalese army, was the last battle fought by the Kingdom of Kandy. It was also the last battle fought between the Portuguese and the Sinhalese.

== Principals ==
	Period	Name
1st	1996-2001	S. M. Keerthirathne
2nd	2001-2003	W. Weerasooriya
3rd	2003-2005	A. K. Diwarathne
4th	2006-2010	T. C. Keerthirathne
5th	2011-2014	S. M. M. G. Abeyrathne
6th	2014-2016	E. M. Abesekara
7th	2016-2019	K. W. D. U. Chandrakumara
8th	2019–2023	Ranjith Rajapaksha
9th	2023–present	Malaka Perera

== Education ==
The only way to get admission for Ranabima Royal College is a highly competitive examination which is conducted by the Central province education department where only the students from Central Province can participate. It means neither students can get admission for Ranabima Royal College from grade 5 Scholarship Examination nor GCE Ordinary Level examination. This entrance examination consists of 3 subjects,

- First language (Sinhala or Tamil)
- Mathematics
- General Knowledge

The school consists of grades 6 through 13. There are two Sinhala medium classes, a Tamil medium class, and an English medium class in every grades until grade 11. This each class consists of forty students. The school has facilities for Physical Science, Commerce, and Biology advanced level schemes. It produces nationally high-ranking students, evidenced by the all-island positions received by students who sit for the national Ordinary Level and Advanced Level examinations. It has been ranked in best boys' school in the years among all the Boys' schools preference rankings based on Ordinary Level examinees' demand.

== Houses ==
- Super Maroon - (3 Titles)
- Bottle Green - (7 Titles)
- Royal Blue - (8 Titles)
- Golden Yellow - (6 Titles)

The four houses are named after the colours which are on the school flag (Green, Yellow and Blue) and maroon in respect of the Sinhalese forces, who gave their lives fighting against the Portuguese army in the Battle of Gannoruwa.

== See also ==
- Ranabima Baseball Club
