= Ranabima Baseball Club =

Sri Lankan college baseball club

- රණබිම බේස්බෝල් සමාජය

Information
- League: Sri Lanka National Baseball Championship League
- Location: Gannoruwa, Kandy, Sri Lanka
- Established: 2006
- League championships: Sri Lanka National Knockout Baseball Championship - 2013; National Baseball Championship - 2014; Malinda Arumadura Memorial Trophy - 2019
- Ownership: Ranabima Royal College
- Coach: T.D. Kulathunge / Kazuya yagi san, Chathuranga Ranasinghe

Ranabima Baseball Club is part of Ranabima Royal College, Kandy. The club was formed in 2006 with the guidance of Mr. C.S. Cooray - master In charge of sports of Ranabima Royal College at the time. The first-ever national level tournament was played in 2008. The registered name of the club is ' Ranabima Royal Sports Club', however often referred as Ranabima Club or Ranabima Baseball Club in Baseball arena. Only Ranabima Royal College student are qualify to the membership of Ranabima Baseball Club presently. The club is one of the leading Club in Sri Lankan Baseball, which is famous for innovative game tactics which contributes the development of the game in Sri Lanka.

== Ranabima Baseball Team Captains ==
Year	Captain
2008 - 2009	U. C. B. Udagedara
2009 - 2010	T. U. Gammanpila
2010 - 2013	L. S. Manna Uthum
2013	S. C. Abeysooriya
2013 - 2014	L. S. Manna Uthum
2014 - 2018	S. U. Jayarathne
2018–2021	Sahan Kulathunge
2021	Vimukthi Senevirathna
2022 - Present	S. Rukshan

== National Baseball Championship ==
Ranabima Baseball club have been champions and runner-up for many times:

- Sri Lanka Baseball Championship (League) 2010 - Runner-up
- Sri Lanka Baseball Championship (Knock-out) 2010 - Champion
- Sri Lanka Baseball Championship (Knock-out) 2011 - Champion
- Sri Lanka Baseball Championship (League) 2012 - Champion
- Sri Lanka Baseball Championship (Knock-out) 2012 - Champion
- Sri Lanka Baseball Championship 2013/14 (League) - Champions
- Sri Lanka Baseball Championship (Knock-out) 2013/14 - Champion
- Sri Lanka Baseball Championship (Knock-out) 2015 - 1st Runner-up
- Sri Lanka Baseball Championship 2016 - Runner-up
- Sri Lanka Baseball Championship (Knock-out) 2017 - Runner-up
- Malinda Arumadura Memorial Baseball Championship 2019 - Champion

== National baseball team members ==
Ranabima Baseball club has produced number of international baseball players. Ranabima baseball players contribution was very effective to win West Asia Baseball cup 2019 to Sri Lanka national baseball team.

=== List of national baseball team members produced by Ranabima Baseball ===
- Vimukthi Senevirathne
- Pasindu Perera
- Theekshna Gammanpila
- S. Darshan
- Lasantha Sanjeewa Manna Uthum
- S. Deeshan
- Prabhath Jayasiri
- Chanaka Nugahapola
- Sanjeewa Jayarathna
- Dilshan Priyadarshana
- Supun Chinthaka Abeysooriya
- Krishna Hapuarachchi

== See also ==
- Ranabima Royal College
- Sri Lanka national baseball team
