= Pothuwila =

Pothuwila, Sri Lanka
- Village
- Nickname: Pothuwila
- Location within Sri Lanka
- Coordinates: 7°50′00″N 80°27′37″E
- Country: Sri Lanka
- Province: North Western Province, Sri Lanka
- Elevation: 120 m (390 ft)
- Time zone: UTC+5:30 (Sri Lanka Standard Time Zone)

Pothuwila is a village near Polpithigama in Sri Lanka. It is situated in Kurunegala District within the North Western Province of Sri Lanka. To reach Pothuwila from Kurunegala need to follow A6 road towards Ibbagamuwa about 12 km (7.5 mi) and from there after following 32 km (20 mi) in Ibbagamuwa-Kumbukgete-Madagalla Road Polpithigama can be found. Then need to turn left from Kumbukulawa junction which is 0.5 km (0.31 mi) Polpithigama town. Pothuwila is about 8 km (5.0 mi) from Polpithigama. Mahawa is a close town to Polpithigama and it is about 18 km (11 mi) from Mahawa to Polpithigama via Madagalla. Pothuwila is 152 km (94 mi) from Colombo, 60 km (37 mi) from Dambulla, 25 km (16 mi) from Mahawa, 24 km (15 mi) from Yapahuwa, 76 km (47 mi) from Anuradhapura and 36 km (22 mi) from Melsiripura.

Pothuwila is located at an altitude of 120 m (390 ft) above sea level and is surrounded by coconut plantations, paddy fields and chena cultivation. The village got its name due to the nearby lake called "Pothuwila". Pothuwila village was founded by settlers came from kingdom of Kandy and nobles among the first settlers proclaimed village name Pothuwila as their surname ("Waasagama"). There are few families still bear this noble surname to this day but not many are left.

== Geography and climate ==
=== Geography ===
Topographically Pothuwila village is based on a plain area with the exception of the surrounding rock outcrops. The northern part of the town is slightly higher than the south. The Pothuwila Lake is the primary geographical feature of Pothuwila. The region comprising the Pothuwila village is located well above the sea level compared to the coastal areas of Sri Lanka. However, the region is not as high as the central hill country of the island. The nearest beaches to Pothuwila are to the western coastal areas and include Negombo and Chilaw.

=== Climate ===
Pothuwila features a tropical rainforest climate. The village's climate is tropical and hot all throughout the year. During the month of April the temperature can rise up to about 33 °C (91 °F). The only major change in the Pothuwila weather occurs during the monsoons from May to August and October to January, this is the time of year where heavy rains can be expected. While the city does experience noticeably drier weather during January and February, it does not qualify as a true dry season as average precipitation in both months are above 60 millimetres (2 in). In general, temperatures from late November to mid-February period are lower than the rest of the year.

The average annual rainfall in Pothuwila is about 2,200 millimetres (87 in).

== Important government places ==
- Siri Parakum Madayama Maha Vidyalaya
- Primary Medical Care Unit Pothuwila/CD Pothuwila

== Nature ==
- Pothuwila Lake
- Hakwatuna Oya

=== The rocks ===
Pothuwila is surrounded by several rock outcrops, a distinctive geological feature of the North Western Province of Sri Lanka. But the main one near Pothuwila is Yapahuwa, which is just 20 mins drive from Pothuwila.

== See also ==
- History of Sri Lanka
- Radala
- Kingdom of Kandy
- Kandyan Wars
