= Chena cultivation =

Chena is the oldest cultivation method in Sri Lanka, it goes far back as more than 5,000 years. (Before the Anuradhapura Kingdom) it the dry zone, the recovery of a chena plot proceeds through various stages of succession, (active chena, abandoned chena, chena re-growth, scrub with pioneer three species, scrub with secondary tree species, secondary forest, secondary forest with primary tree species and finally, the climax or steady-state forest. The smooth progress of their recovery process depends on the absence of further disturbances, such as a re-cultivation of active or abandoned chena plots, fire and human development activates such as settlements. However, in the wet zone, the process of vegetational succession and recovery take more complex routes. In moderately degraded site where the soil surface is nit servery exposed, vegetation succession can be relatively rapid with the appearance of pioneer species and then secondary species which are eventually replaced by primary species, if left intact. In contrast, highly degraded sites, (e.g:- exposed to elements of weather, the vegetation will not recover up to the level of a forest, but remain as fenlands or grasslands for a very long time. The sensitive Red-Yellow podzolic soil, on exposure, transforms into a hard laterite and becomes impoverished due to erosion of its humus layer. This edaphic transformation is least conductive to the appearance of afforest vegetation, but usually supports inly a low-stature vegetation such as fenland dominated by kekilla (Dicrnopteris linearis) A new chena, created by setting fire to it, is called a Nawadeli Hena. Those Chenas are fertile. The term Nawadeli Sena has been mentioned i the Saddharma Rathnawaliya as well. In some parts of Sri Lanka, a different term has been given to the term Nawadeli Sea. It says the term Nawadeli Sena is used for the cultivation of the nine plants, namely finger millet (Kurakkan), Kollu, Undu, Green Gram (Mun), Corn (Iringu), Millet (Thanahal), Dill and Amu. The villagers in Anuradhapura had given the name Kanaththa to name the Chenas prepared for cultivation after giving it up for a short while.

== See also ==
- Agriculture in Sri Lanka
- Economy of Sri Lanka
- Anuradhapura Kingdom
- Polonnaruwa Kingdom
