= Agriculture in Sri Lanka =

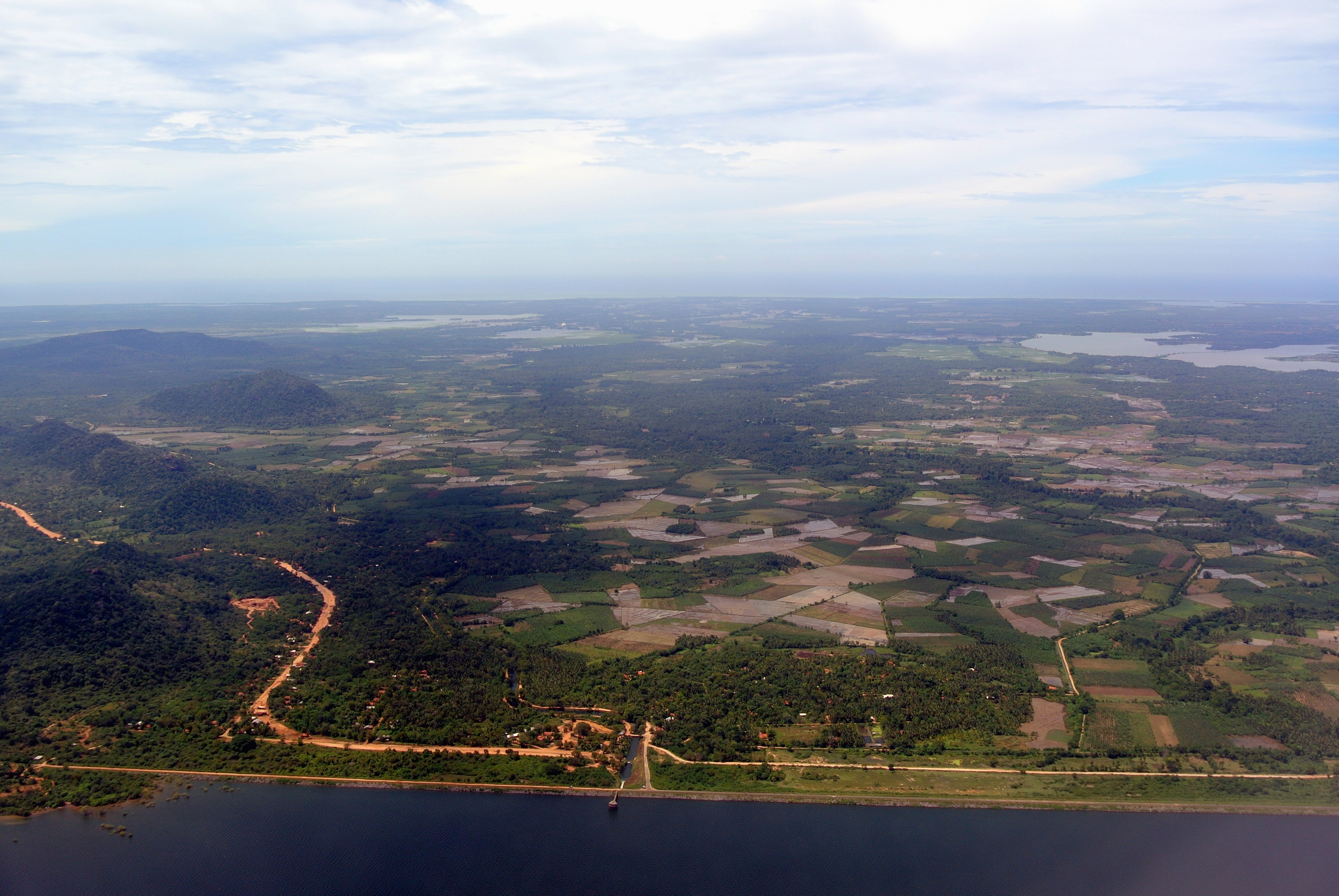
Aerial view of the Southern Province showing the land use patterns of the coastal belt.

The primary form of agriculture in Sri Lanka is rice production. Rice is cultivated during Maha and Yala seasons. Tea is cultivated in the central highlands and is a major source of foreign exchange. Vegetables, fruits and oilseed crops are also cultivated in the country. There are two Agriculture Parks abbreviated as A. Parks established by the Department of Agriculture. Out of the total population in Sri Lanka, 27.1% engages in agricultural activities. Agriculture accounted for 7.4% of the GDP (gross domestic product) in 2020.

== History ==
Sri Lanka (formerly Ceylon) has been an agricultural country since time immemorial. The chief occupation of then Sri Lanka was agriculture, and land use in ancient Sri Lanka had been mainly agricultural. People grew their own food and there was hardly any foreign agricultural food trade. The earliest agricultural settlements were in the river valleys in the northern and south-eastern plains and the main crop cultivation was paddy under rain-fed conditions. One of the main features of the civilization in ancient Sri Lanka was the development of irrigation technology. Thousands of small irrigation tanks of varying sizes and shapes, particularly in the Dry Zone provided water for paddy cultivation. Paddy was cultivated only in one season and during the dry season, the lands were left fallow. Uplands were cultivated under rainfed conditions with subsidiary food crops under a shifting cultivation system. Until the 19th-century subsistence agriculture continued to be the mainstay of the country.

The system of subsistence agriculture continued until the advent of foreigners. Coffee (Coffea arabica) was introduced in 1722 by the Dutch, (during the Dutch Ceylon) and the British (during the British Ceylon), who arrived in the country in 1796, promoted the cultivation of this crop. With the rapid increase in the consumption of coffee in England, the demand for coffee increased considerably and coffee cultivation also expanded. The fall of coffee resulted in the development of other plantation crops. Coffee lands in the central highlands were replaced by tea (Camellia sinensis) and were promoted from the 1860s onwards. While tea replaced coffee in the upcountry areas, rubber (Hevea brasiliensis) was planted in the low country. Rubber was introduced in 1876 but its cultivation began in the 1890s and gradually expanded. Coconut (Cocos nucifera) was initially cultivated in home gardens. The local planters concentrated more on coconut and by 1900 coconut covered around 40% of the cultivated area. Most of the coconuts were cultivated in the Southern and North Western province of the country. By the end of the 19th century, with the opening of lands for plantation crops, this sector became the dominant sector of the economy. However, after Sri Lanka became an independent country in 1948, there was more emphasis on the cultivation of food crops. The first Prime Minister of Ceylon late Mr. D.S. Senanayake, followed by other leaders promoted the cultivation of paddy and other food crops. Large extents of land were cleared and irrigation schemes such as Galoya were initiated to increase food production. Colonization schemes were established to settle people from densely populated areas. At present, the plantation sector and the cultivation of domestic crops constitute the agricultural sector of Sri Lanka. Around 80% of the people live in rural areas and their main income is derived from crops.

== Rice cultivation in Sri Lanka ==
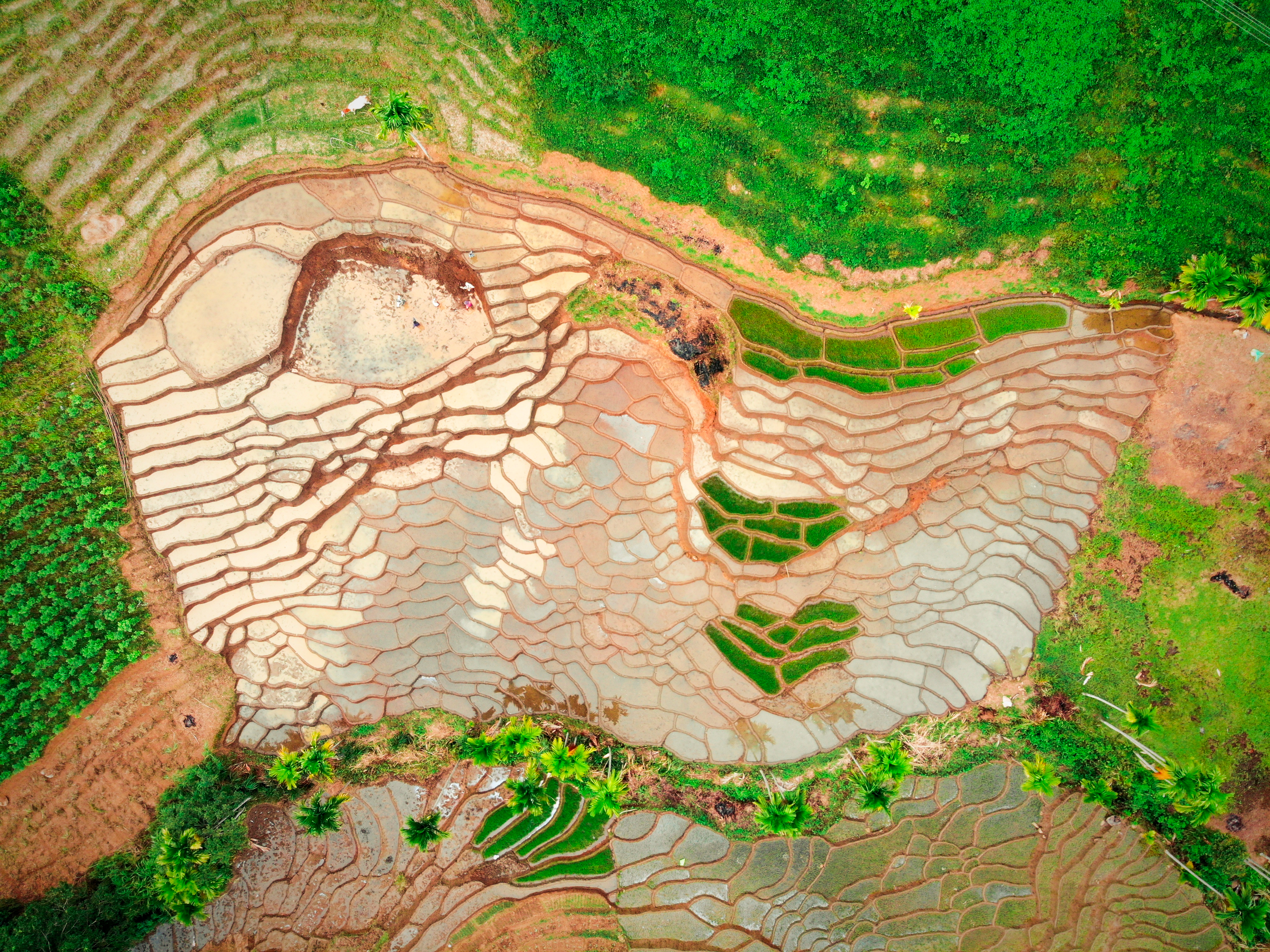
Aerial view of the Badulla showing land use patterns

The beginning of paddy cultivation in Sri Lanka dates back in history between 3,000 years and the 3rd century B.C. Mostly paddy field-based rivers or water resources.

Present-day rice production is one of the main crops and staple foods in Sri Lanka. Rice is the staple food of 21 million Sri Lankans and is the livelihood of more than 2 million farmers. More than 30 per cent of the total labour force is directly or indirectly involved in the rice sector. The annual per capita consumption of rice was around 92 kg in 1998. In the 1990s total production was near 3 million metric tonnes of rough rice (paddy), which is about 60 per cent of the national requirement (2013). Sri Lanka needs about 3–4 million metric tonnes annually. Today 30–40% of rice is imported from India. Because Sri Lankan farmers left farming. It cultivates mostly the North Central and East provinces of Sri Lanka. The seasons are called the Maha season and the Yala season. Maha Season starts in September and ends in March. Yala season starts in May and ends in August. Maha season is the main and most important paddy season.

== Tea plantations ==
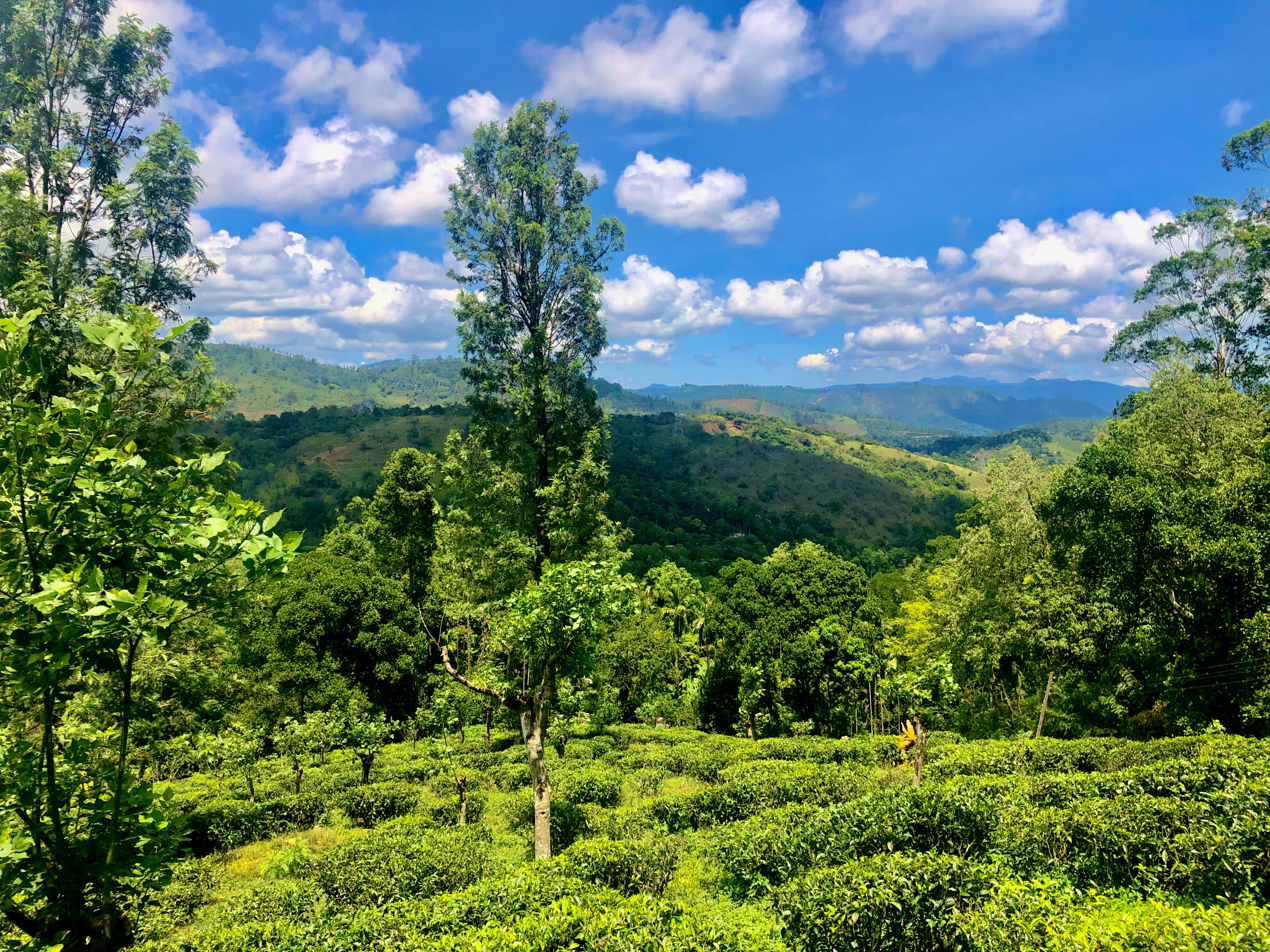
Tea plantation at about 1,800 m above sea level in Namunukula, Hill Country

As an attempt to recuperate the losses caused by the downfall of coffee plantation (such as 1869 Hemileia vastatrix disease and the drooping prices of coffee cultivatable lands during 1847), Tea was planted in Sri Lanka as an experimental crop. Several research groups were sent to Assam to study and identify the necessary prerequisites for the new crop. In between this tea industry was introduced to the country in 1867 by James Taylor, the British planter who arrived in 1852, in Lool Kandura. It is one of the main sources of foreign exchange for Sri Lanka and accounts for 2% of GDP, generating roughly $700 million annually to the economy of Sri Lanka. It employs, directly or indirectly over 1 million people, and in 1995 directly employed 215,338 on tea plantations and estates. Sri Lanka is the world's fourth largest producer of tea. In 1995, it was the world's leading exporter of tea, (rather than producer) with 23% of the total world export, but it has since been surpassed by Kenya.

The humidity, cool temperatures, and rainfall in the country's central highlands provide a climate that favors the production of high quality tea.

The major tea growing areas are Kandy and Nuwara Eliya in Central Province, Badulla, Bandarawela and Haputale in Uva Province, Galle, Matara and Mulkirigala in Southern Province, and Ratnapura and Kegalle in Sabaragamuwa Province.

== Fruits and vegetables ==
Around eighty different varieties of fruits and vegetables are grown in Sri Lanka's varied agro-climatic areas. The cool and salubrious climatic conditions in the hill country are ideal for temperate crops such as carrot, leek, cabbage, cauliflower, salad leaves, beet, bean, bell pepper, and salad cucumber. The well-demarcated low country and dry wet areas are suitable for a variety of tropical fruits and vegetables ranging from green chilli, red onion, pumpkin, bitter gourd, melon, sweet and sour banana types, queen pineapple, papaya, mango, lemon and gherkins.

Certain indigenous yams colloquially named innala (Lecranthus) and kiri ala (Xanthasoma sagittifolium), underwater stems of kohila (Lasia spinosa) and nelum ala (Nymphea lotus) and fruits and pods of perennial crops such as breadfruit, young jak and murunga are foreign exchange spinners of the country. It is the same with special flavoured Sri Lankan pineapple, mangosteen, ripe jak, avocado, rambutan, starfruit and anoda.

Sri Lanka produces more than 800,000 metric tons of fruits and vegetables annually and exports both fresh and processed varieties to many destinations in the world. 90% of the fresh produce is exported to the Middle East and the Maldives, and approximately 75% of the processed products go to the European market.

Currently Sri Lanka is looking to obtain arid-climate-resistant fruit species from Egypt to develop agriculture in the dry zones of Sri Lanka.

== Oilseed crops ==
Oilseed crops such as groundnut, sesame, sunflower and mustard are also cultivated in Sri Lanka. Groundnut is grown mainly in Moneragala, Hambantota, Kurunegala, Anuradhapura, Badulla, Ratnapura and Puttalam districts. Though groundnut is an oil crop, it has a demand as a snack and confectionery in Sri Lanka.

== Cocoa Beans ==
In 2019, Sri Lanka produced 1,499 Metric Tons of cocoa beans (2018: 2,115) and was number 32 among the cocoa-producing countries. The export of cocoa beans accounts for 0.5% of global exports. The area around Matale and Dumbara Valley have always been the most important regions where cocoa beans are grown.

== Agrotechnology parks ==
Sri Lanka's first agrotechnology park was established in the Kandy district. The park is bounded on three sides by the river Mahaweli in the historically important place of Gannoruwa in Kandy and lies at an altitude of 473 m (1550 ft) above sea level in a total area of two square kilometres. The second agrotechnology park was established in the Hambantota district adjoining the government farm in Batatha.

== Spices ==
In 2015 alone, Sri Lanka's spice exports amounted to US$377 million, up from US$264 million the previous year.

Sri Lanka's most famous export, cinnamon is the island's premier spice export. Industry insiders classify the spice into two forms, Ceylon cinnamon (Cinnamomum Zeylanicum), and Cassia Cinnamon. Ceylon cinnamon is the costlier variety and is considered to be a much more upmarket product by those in the West. Sri Lanka exported US$128 million worth of cinnamon in 2014, which accounted for 28% of global cinnamon exports for that year.

Black pepper is the second largest export spice in Sri Lanka. Most black pepper is exported to India. But India and Vietnam re-export to Europe Sri Lankan pepper under the Indian/Vietnam label.

Cardamom, one of the most important spices in the traditional cuisine of Sri Lanka, is mainly grown in the province of Sabaragamuwa around Deniyaya and Rakwana, but 90 to 95% percent of the cardamon which is harvested are consumed in the country itself.

Sri Lankan spices
English name	Sinhala Name	Tamil Name
Curry Leaves	කරපිංචා	கறிவேப்பிலை
Turmeric	කහ	மஞ்சள்
Clove	කාරාබුනැටි	கிராம்பு
Cinnamon	කුරුඳු	இலவங்கப்பட்டை
Pepper	ගම්මිරිස්	மிளகு
Cardamom	එංසහල්	ஏலக்காய்
Lemongrass and Citronella	සේර	எலுமிச்சை
Nutmeg and Mace	සාදික්කා, වසාවාසි	ஜாதிக்காய், மெஸ்
Vanilla	වැනිලා	வெண்ணிலா
Ginger	ඉඟුරු	இஞ்சி

== Development issues ==
According to the World Bank:

- Weaknesses in strategy and policy
- Heavy public sector regulatory interventions in commodity and input/factor markets
- Weak delivery of services in rural areas
- Destructive impact of civil conflict and tsunami

== See also ==
- Economy of Sri Lanka
- Plantation industry in Sri Lanka
