= List of largest public companies in Sri Lanka =

This article lists the largest companies in Sri Lanka terms of their revenue, net profit and total assets, according to the Colombo Stock Exchange business magazines

== 2022 list ==
This list is based on the Sri Lanka Parliament, which ranks the Sri Lanka's largest public companies.

Rank	Name	Financial statistics in millions US$			Industry
Rank	Name	Revenue	Profit	Assets	Industry
1	Ceylon Petroleum Corporation	3,016	9.9	1,477	Oil and gas
2	Bank of Ceylon	1,316	413	13,290	Banking
3	Ceylon Electricity Board	1,268	-138.12	4,127	Electricity generation
4	SriLankan Airlines	1,017	-230.28	1,273	Airline
5	People's Bank	1,013	70	10,320	Banking
6	National Savings Bank	672.42	36.89	6,370	Banking
7	Sri Lanka Telecom	474.85	34.92	1,154	Telecommunications
8	Sri Lanka Ports Authority	248.25	5.77	1,988	Commercial ports
9	Sri Lanka Insurance	242.5	28.55	941.5	Insurance
