= Marshall–Lerner condition =

Economic concept

The Marshall–Lerner condition (after Alfred Marshall and Abba P. Lerner) is satisfied if the absolute sum of a country's export and import demand elasticities (demand responsiveness to price) is greater than one. If it is satisfied, then if a country begins with a zero trade deficit then when the country's currency depreciates (e.g., in case the US is the country in focus, it takes more dollars to buy the Japanese yen), its balance of trade will improve (e.g., the U.S. will develop a trade surplus with Japan). The country's imports become more expensive and exports become cheaper due to the change in relative prices, and the Marshall-Lerner condition implies that the indirect effect on the quantity of trade will exceed the direct effect of the country having to pay a higher price for its imports and receive a lower price for its exports.

Suppose the U.S. exports 100 million tons of goods to Japan at a price of $1/ton and imports 100 million tons at a price of 100 yen/ton and an exchange rate of $.01/yen, so the trade balance is zero, $100 million of goods going each way. Then the dollar depreciates by 10%, so the exchange rate is $.011/yen. The immediate effect is to hurt the U.S. trade balance because if the quantities of imports and exports stay the same the value of exports is still $100 million but imports will now cost $110 million, a trade deficit of $10 million. It takes time for consumers around the world to adapt and change their quantities demanded; the shorter the time frame, the less elastic is demand. In the long run, consumers react more to changed prices: demand is more elastic the longer the time frame. Japanese consumers will react to the cheaper dollar by buying more American goods-- say, a 6% increase to 106 million tons for $106 million-- and American consumers will react to the more expensive yen by buying less Japanese goods-- say, a 10% decline to 90 million tons for $99 million, creating a trade surplus of $7 million.

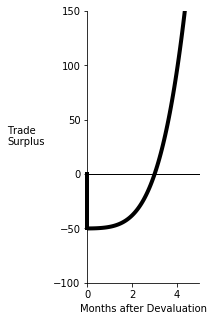
The J-Curve

This example has an elasticity of Japanese demand for American exports of .6 (= 6%/10%) and elasticity of demand for American imports of -1 (= -10%/10%), so it satisfies the Marshall-Lerner condition that the sum of the magnitudes of the elasticities (|-.6| + |-1|) exceeds 1. The direct negative price effect of the depreciation on the balance of trade is outweighed by the indirect positive quantity effect. This pattern of a short run worsening of the trade balance after depreciation or devaluation of the currency (because the short-run elasticities add up to less than one) and long run improvement (because the long-run elasticities add up to more than one) is known as the J-curve effect.

Essentially, the Marshall–Lerner condition is an extension of Marshall's theory of the price elasticity of demand to foreign trade, the analog to the idea that if demand facing seller is elastic he can increase his revenue by reducing his price.

== Mathematical derivation ==
Normalize domestic and foreign prices in their own currencies to each equal 1. Let X and M denote the quantities of exports and imports and e denote the price of foreign currency in terms of domestic currency. The trade surplus in domestic currency (dollars in this equation) is dollar exports minus dollar imports:

$$Surplus = ( X \;tons) \cdot  (\$1/ton) - (M\; tons)\cdot  (1 yen/ton) \cdot(\$e/yen)$$

or more simply, eliminating the units and putting everything into dollars,

$$Surplus = X - eM$$

The derivative of Surplus with respect to the exchange rate e is

$$\frac{dSurplus}{de} = \frac{dX}{de}    -  e\frac{dM}{de} - M$$

Multiplying and dividing by M we get

$$\frac{dSurplus}{de}= M\left( \left[\frac{dX}{de}\frac{e}{X}\right] \frac{X}{eM} - \left[ \frac{dM}{de}\frac{e}{M}\right]  -1\right).$$

Since the elasticity of Y with respect to X is (dY/dX)(X/Y), we can write this in terms of the elasticities of demand of exports and imports, $\epsilon_x$ and $\epsilon_m$.

$$\frac{dSurplus}{de}=
M\left(  \epsilon_x \frac{X}{eM} -  \epsilon_m  -1\right).$$

Subtract and add eM to the numerator of the first term to get

$$\frac{dSurplus}{de}  = M\left(  \epsilon_x   \frac{X-eM}{eM}+  \epsilon_x    -  \epsilon_m  -1\right)$$

If the value of exports minus imports equals zero so the trade surplus is X - eM = 0, the last equation simplifies to

$$\frac{dSurplus}{de}  = M\left(     \epsilon_x    -  \epsilon_m  -1\right),$$

so the trade surplus rises if the absolute values of the two elasticities add to more than 1, which is the Marshall-Lerner condition.

If the initial trade surplus is positive so X - eM > 0, the sum of the magnitudes of the elasticities can be less than 1 and the depreciation can still improve the balance of trade, resulting in an even bigger surplus than initially. That happens because when X is bigger than EM, a smaller value of $\epsilon_x$ will still result in a big effect on the value of X; the smaller percentage increase from $\epsilon_x$ still has a big effect when X is big. Similarly, if the economy starts out with a trade deficit and X - eM < 0, the elasticities have to add up to more than 1 for depreciation to improve the balance of trade, because the initial harmful price effect is bigger, so the quantity responses have to be bigger to compensate. Suppose initially the US exports 60 million tons of goods to Japan and imports 100 million tons of other goods under an exchange rate of $.01/yen and prices of $1/ton and 100 yen/ton, for a trade deficit of $40 million. The initial effect of dollar depreciation to $.011/yen is to make imports cost $110 million, and the deficit rises to $50 million. If the long-run export and import elasticities equal .5 and -.5, exports will rise 5% to $63 million and imports will fall 5% to $104.5 million. The long-run result is a trade deficit of $41.5 million, smaller than the short-run deficit but bigger than the original deficit of $40 million before the depreciation.

Note that a common source of confusion is the price used in the elasticities, which determines whether an elasticity is positive or negative. Demand elasticities are ordinarily the elasticity of demand for a good with respect to the price of the good, and they ordinarily are negative numbers. Here, we have been using the elasticity of demand with respect to the exchange rate--- defined as domestic/foreign ($e/yen). For domestic consumers, when the exchange rate rises, imports are more expensive, so they buy less and we see a negative elasticity, the usual result. For foreign consumers, when the exchange rate rises, the exports they buy are cheaper for them and they buy more, so we see a positive elasticity. This is not an upward sloping demand curve; their price has actually fallen. For American consumers the price of imports from Japan is $e/yen, but for Japanese consumers the price of exports from America is yen/($e).
