= Poverty in Sri Lanka =

Poverty in Sri Lanka was estimated at 16.9% of the population as of 2025, according to World Bank calculations down from a high of 20.7% in 2023, after an economic crisis but is projected to fall to 15.8% in 2026. Persistently high rates of child stunting point to lasting effects of the crisis on the most vulnerable, the World Bank said in a report.

Sri Lanka's life expectancy and literacy rate are nearly on par with those of developed countries, and top the rankings for the South Asia region. While all these indicate that Sri Lanka should be experiencing a high standard of living, until recently it has only ranked in the medium category of the Human Development Index (HDI). This is despite the fact that Sri Lanka has been experiencing moderate GDP growth, averaging 5.5 per annum between 2006 and 2009. One of the reasons is its relatively low GDP per capital. The Sri Lankan government has been successful in reducing poverty from 15.2% in 2006 to 8.9% in 2010, urban poverty was reduced from 6.7 to 5.3% while rural poverty was reduced from 15.7 to 9.5%, and the nation has made significant progress towards achieving Millennium Development Goals on eradicating extreme poverty and hunger.

== Population ==
As of reports from 2024, 24.5% of the population lives below the poverty line.

This highlights a link between isolation from social and economic infrastructure, cities and markets, and higher levels of poverty incidence. One explanation could be that it limits these people from earning income through off-farm activities. In addition, with more than 40 per cent of the rural poor people being small farmers, their production systems may be hampered by the usual suspects of fragmented landholdings, poor economies of scale, low investment levels resulting from poor financial services as well as inappropriate or limited technology.

According to the Asian Development Bank, the population of Sri Lanka was 19.71 million in 2015. In 2014, 6.7% of the country lived below the national poverty line. During the same year, it was also reported that 50.5% of the population aged 15 years and above were employed.

== Regional poverty ==
Percent of population living on less than $2.15, $3.65 and $6.85 a day, international dollars (2017 PPP) as per the World Bank.

Percent of population living on less than poverty thresholds
District	< $2.15 a day	< $3.65 a day	< $6.85 a day	Year
Colombo	0.41%	3.85%	27.82%	2016
Gampaha	0.45%	6.07%	40.29%	2016
Kalutara	0.91%	13.28%	47.88%	2016
Kandy	2.22%	17.97%	56.02%	2016
Matale	1.64%	15.30%	56.91%	2016
Nuwara Eliya	1.53%	21.86%	71.01%	2016
Galle	1.00%	10.35%	49.42%	2016
Matara	1.22%	17.11%	58.25%	2016
Hambantota	0.19%	6.64%	47.28%	2016
Jaffna	1.73%	23.16%	68.24%	2016
Mannar	0.21%	10.63%	64.29%	2016
Vavuniya	0.72%	5.98%	49.18%	2016
Mullaitivu	5.65%	40.15%	77.75%	2016
Kilinochchi	7.62%	41.06%	85.85%	2016
Batticaloa	3.82%	31.47%	78.84%	2016
Ampara	0.68%	11.24%	61.55%	2016
Trincomalee	3.85%	29.76%	72.08%	2016
Kurunegala	0.81%	9.91%	49.05%	2016
Puttlam	0.72%	8.48%	47.36%	2016
Anuradhapura	1.17%	9.44%	48.85%	2016
Polonnaruwa	1.41%	12.10%	55.23%	2016
Badulla	0.77%	22.54%	65.17%	2016
Moneragala	1.12%	19.31%	67.11%	2016
Ratnapura	2.42%	25.11%	69.81%	2016
Kegalle	2.85%	18.67%	61.34%	2016
Sri Lanka	1.3%	13.9%	52.8%	2016

== Development ==
In 2008, it was reported that tens of thousands of men from impoverished villages were joining the Sri Lanka Armed Forces and Sri Lanka Police Service to escape rural poverty, as the wages offered by the security services significantly raise the standard of living for soldiers and their families.

In order to reduce rural poverty (and thus poverty as a whole), rural development in terms of infrastructure is important. The need for a better road network and transport system to link up the rural areas as well as better credit facilities to aid in the investments of new technology and farming techniques are just a start in ensuring that the rural poor are not left behind.

While it is identified that development in the rural areas is crucial for poverty alleviation, the government cannot possibly channel unlimited funds into development plans without constraints, disregarding potential developments in urban areas, or more importantly, not considering the state of its overall economy. Therefore, the Sri Lankan government faces a dilemma of pursuing growth that is equitable; trying to promote economic growth without leaving the poor in the rural area behind.

Apart from government policies, Non-Governmental Organizations (NGOs) help ease the situation too. One of them is Sarvodaya. Sarvodaya is Sri Lanka's largest NGO, which includes many other divisional units dedicated to different development projects. Sarvodaya Economic Empowerment Development Services (SEEDS) began its operation as a separate division in 1986 and now reaches 18 of Sri Lanka's 25 districts. SEEDS is responsible for building the economic capacity of the poorest groups within the communities. Its aim is to stimulate an attitude of entrepreneurship, innovation, thrift and sustainable development in the rural areas.

Although SEEDS does not directly deal with the lack of physical infrastructure in rural areas, i.e. development plans in building roads, bridges, etc., it has helped people in rural areas to be a financially independent and improved livelihood, which in turn helps reduce rural poverty. It hopes that through their aid, villages can become self-governed and capable of serving their community's economic and social needs.

SEEDS provides saving and credit services for starting a small enterprise or to improve livelihood as well as non-financial services such as business counselling, training in technical skills and market information. It uses the village banking microfinance model to help the rural communities. Village banking treats the whole community as one unit and establishes semi-formal or formal institutions through which micro-finance is dispensed. The banks are run by their own people: they choose their members, elect their own officers, establish their own by-laws, distribute loans to individuals, and collect payments and savings. Their loans are backed, not by goods or property, but by moral collateral: the promise that the group stands behind each individual loan. Therefore, this is a means of ensuring that each individual will be disciplined in saving up to repay their own loans. 86% of SEEDS beneficiaries actually had functioning micro-enterprises. Statistics have shown that 51% of SEEDS beneficiaries showed increased revenues while 73% of them showed increased profits.

There are 1,129,344 members in these village banks, out of which 60% of the members are females. This in itself has empowered women as they are less dependent on others for their capital needs. They have more bargaining power within the households and thus need not feel as insecure as before. Secondly, they have guaranteed and sure access to capital thus removing uncertainty and permitting a confidential basis to stay in business and even expand. This is a major empowerment both socially and economically for these women, as this micro-finance model not only raises their level of productivity but also allows women to contribute to family income, leading to an overall reduction in poverty levels in the rural areas. Other than financial services, SEEDS has been able to integrate spiritual revival, social change and economic development. It has helped restore a person's sense of pride and self-esteem, as well as that of the village community. The earlier feeling of humiliation and of powerlessness vanishes with the collective sense that is generated.

== See also ==
- Sri Lankan sporting disappearances
