= Department of Agriculture (Sri Lanka) =

The Department of Agriculture (DOA) functions under the Ministry of Agriculture of Government of Sri Lanka is one of the largest government departments with a high profile community of agricultural scientists and a network of institutions covering different agro ecological regions island wide. DOA focuses on maintaining and increasing productivity and production of the food crops in the country. Two Agriculture parks functions under the department.

== Main Functions ==
- Research
- Agriculture Extension
- Seed and planting material production
- Regulatory Services (Plant Protection Act, Soil Conservation Act, Control of Pesticide Act, Seed Act)

== Management Structure ==
The Management structure of DOA consists of three research institutes:

1. Rice Research and Development Institute.
2. Field Crops Research and Development Institute.
3. Horticultural Crops Research and Development Institute.
4. Fruit Research and Development Institute

and six technical service centers:

1. Seed Certification and Plant Protection Centre.
2. Seed and Planting Material Development Center.
3. Extension and Training Centre.
4. National Agriculture Information & Communication Centre
5. Socio Economics and Planning Center.
6. Natural Resource Management Center.
7. Progress Monitoring and Evaluation Unit.

== Agro technology Parks ==
Agro Technology Park is one of the initiatives for agriculture extension, education and agro tourism implemented by the Department of Agriculture, Sri Lanka. The first Agro Park was established in Kandy district. The park is bounded in three sides with the river Mahaweli in the historically important place of Gannoruwa in Kandy and, lies at an altitude of 473 m (1550 ft) above sea level in a total area of 2 square kilometers. The A parks comprise the majority of the institutions of the Department of Agriculture. The second A-Park was established in Hambantota district adjoining to the Government Farm in Batatha.
