= Gannoruwa =

Coordinates: 7°17′N 80°35′E

- Village
- Interactive map of Gannoruwa
- Country: Sri Lanka
- Province: Central Province
- Time zone: UTC+5:30 (Sri Lanka Standard Time)

Gannoruwa is a village in Sri Lanka. It is located within Central Province. Gannoruwa has its own historical connections. In 1638, the Battle of Gannoruwa was fought between the Portuguese and the Sinhala forces under King Rajasinha ll and Prince Vijayapala on this land. The Battle of Gannoruwa, which ended in victory for the Sinhalese army, was the last battle fought by the Kingdom of Kandy. It was also the last battle fought between the Portuguese and the Sinhalese.

== See also ==
- List of towns in Central Province, Sri Lanka
- Battle of Gannoruwa
