= Zahira College, Colombo =

Zahira College

Location
- Zahira College Colombo, Orabi Pasha Street, Maradana, Western Province, 01000; Sri Lanka
- 6.927351°N 79.864175°E

Information
- Former name: Madarasathul Zahira
- Type: Semi government
- Motto: Arabic: Alhamdulillah (Praise be to Allah)
- Established: 21 August 1892; 133 years ago
- Founder: Ahmed Orabi, A. M. Wapchi Marikar and M. C. Siddi Lebbe
- School district: Colombo
- School number: +(94) 11 2695062
- Principal: A. R. M. Trizvy Marikkar (2013 - present)
- Teaching staff: 250+
- Grades: 1–13 (English, Sinhala and Tamil Medium)
- Gender: Boys School
- Age: From 6 years to 19 years
- Enrollment: 5500+
- Colours: Green, white, maroon
- Alumni: Old Zahirians
- Website: zahiracollege.lk

Zahira College (commonly known as Zahira) (Sinhala: සහිරා විදුහල, Tamil: சாஹிரா கல்லுரி) is an Islamic school in Maradana, Colombo, Sri Lanka, founded in 1892 as Al Madrasathul Zahira by Islamic lawyer and educationalist, M. C. Siddi Lebbe, with the patronage of Ahmed Orabi Pasha of Egypt. The college's campus features one of the oldest mosques in the country.

The word Zahira means "excellence" in Arabic.

== History ==
Zahira College was established as a school mainly for Muslims in 1892. It was conceived by Islamic lawyer and educator M. C. Siddi Lebbe, during a time when English education was viewed with suspicion due to its association with proselytism. At the time, almost all schools in Sri Lanka were run by Christian missionaries, and English education was seen as a tool for converting non-Christians to Christianity. This posed a challenge for Muslims who wanted to provide their children with a modern education but were wary of exposing them to religious conversion.

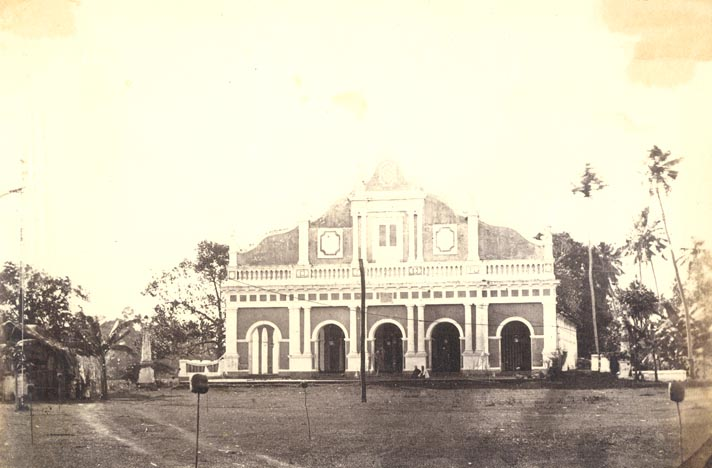
Photo of the Zahira College Mosque, also known as the Maradana Mosque. The mosque was established long before the college was started and was patronised by A. M. Wapchie Marikar.

In a public speech in 1891 at the Maradana Mosque Hall (which later became the college mosque), M. C. Siddhi Lebbe appealed to the Muslim community to unite to promote the educational advancement of the community. This appeal led to the formation of the Colombo Muslim Educational Society, with I. L. M. Abdul Aziz as the first secretary and Arasi Marikar Wapchie Marikar as the first treasurer and headmaster, assisted by Ahamed Orabi Pasha, an Egyptian exile in Ceylon. On Monday, 22 August 1892, Zahira College opened its doors to students. The school started with 37 students, rising to 125 by the end of its first year of operation.

The Zahira College magazine is entitled Crescent.

== Governance ==
Zahira College is overseen by a board comprising 18 governors drawn from the executive committee of the Maradana Mosque, the Zahira College Welfare Society, the Zahira College Parent-Teachers Association, and the Zahira College Old Boys' Association. M. Fouzul Hameed took over as chairman of the Board of Governors in 2006.

Notable former principals of the college include Tuan Burhanudeen Jayah (1921-1947), A. M. A. Azeez (1948-1961), and R. I. T. Alles (1983-1985). The current principal, since 2013, is A. R. M. Trizviiy Marikkar.

== Sports facilities ==
The project to build a college swimming pool was proposed and funded by the Old Boys Association. It was initiated in 2010 and completed on 14 July 2012, opening for students, alumni, and the public (after school hours).

The college began constructing a major sports complex in 2020.

== Notable alumni ==
Name	Notability	Reference
Ahmed Hilmy Didi	Vice President of the Maldives (1975–1977)	
V. Anandasangaree	Member of Parliament - Kilinochchi (1970–1983), Jaffna (2000–2004)	
U. L. M. Mohideen	Member of Parliament - Ampara (1994–2001)	
Sir Razik Fareed	Member of Parliament, Minister of Trade	
A. H. M. Fowzie	Member of Parliament - National List (2015–present), Colombo (1994–2015), Mayor of Colombo (1974–1977)	
Abdul Bakeer Markar	Speaker of the Parliament (1977–1983), Member of Parliament - Beruwala (1960–1988), Governor of Southern Province (1988–1993)	
Ali Sabry	Minister of Foreign Affairs (2022–Present), Minister of Finance (2022), Minister of Justice (2020–2022), Member of Parliament - National List (2020–present)	
Badi-ud-din Mahmud	Minister of Education (1970–1977),(1960-1963), Member of Parliament	
Abdul Caffoor Mohamad Ameer	32nd Attorney General of Sri Lanka	
Shibly Aziz	37th Attorney General of Sri Lanka	
Alavi Moulana	Governor Western Province (2002–2015), Minister of Labour (2001–2002)	
Naina Marikkar	Minister of Finance (1988–1989)	
Prof. Tuley De Silva	Chancellor of the WUSL	
Prof. Achi Mohamed Ishaq	Chancellor of the SEUSL	
A.H.M. Azwer	Member of Sri Lankan Parliament for national list (1989–1994, 2010–2014)	
Prof. M.T.A. Furkhan	Academic, Inductee- Global Management Accounting Hall of Fame	
Ameer Ali	Minister of Disaster Relief Management (2007–2010), Member of Sri Lankan Parliament (2015–present)	
A. M. Merza	Member of Sri Lankan Parliament for Kalmunai (1952–1956)	
M. H. M. Ashraff	Minister of Ports, Shipping and Rehabilitation (1994–2000), Member of the Sri Lankan Parliament (1989–2000)	
M. L. M. Aboosally	Member of the Sri Lankan Parliament, Minister of Labor, Rugby Player	
Fareez Yusuf	Retired Major General of the Sri Lankan Army	
Meerasahib Abdul Majeed	Former Member of the Parliament of Sri Lanka, Retired Senior Superintendent of Police	
M. H. Omar	Founder of Brandix	
Mohamed Uvais Mohamed	Chairman and CEO of Ceylon Petroleum Corporation, Chairman and CEO of Ceylon Petroleum Storage Terminals	
Jumar Preena	CEO and Founder of CH17 Loyalty	
Fouzul Hameed	Managing Director of Hameedia, Founder of Envoy London	
Fathhi Mohamed	Co-Founder of PickMe	
Mohamed Shahey Faleel	Senior General Manager of Dialog	
Mohammed Rizvie	Chief Executive Officer of Softlogic Holdings Middle East, Chief Executive Officer of Softlogic Holdings Retail	
Mujibur Rahman	Member of Parliament - Colombo (2015–present)	
Saleem Marsoof	Puisne Justice of the Supreme Court of Sri Lanka (2005–2014)	
S. Z. M. Mashoor Moulana	Senator - Senate of Ceylon	
A. J. M. Muzammil	Mayor of Colombo (2011–2016), Governor of Western Province (2019), Governor of North Western Province (2019–present)	
Rishad Bathiudeen	Minister of Industry and Commerce (2010–2019), Member of Sri Lankan Parliament for Vavuniya (2001–present)	
Rezvi Sheriff	academic, physician	
S. Selvanayagam	Academic, Professor Jaffna University	
Karthigesu Sivathamby	emeritus professor (Tamil studies), author	
R. Sivagurunathan	Academic, Lawyer and Editor Thinakaran	
Mohamed Azmeer	Academic (ICT), Head of the Department of Applied IT at SLTC Research University, Head of the Department of Multimedia at SLTC Research University,	
Hasen Ali	Member of Parliament - National List (2004–2015)	
Dharmadasa Banda	Cabinet Minister for additional plantation crops (2007–2010) and Member of Parliament Monaragala (1989–2000, 2004–2010)	
M. M. Zuhair	Member of parliament for the nationalist (1994–2000), Chairman Rupavahini and Sri Lankan Ambassador to Iran	
Ben Navaratne	First class cricketer (1940–1952)	
Ibrahim Hamid	Member of the Sri Lanka National Rugby Team, Former Retired Senior Superintendent of Police	
Mohamed Amanulla	Captain of Sri Lanka National Football Team	
Hisham Abdeen	Member of the Sri Lanka National Rugby Team	
Muttaiah Devaraj	First class cricketer (1964–1967)	
Ghulam Razick	First class cricketer (1960s)	
Mohammed Shamaaz	First class cricketer (2020–Present)	
