= Teejay Lanka =

Knitted fabric manufacturer in Sri Lanka

Teejay Lanka PLC
- Logo of the Company
- Type: Public
- Traded as: CSE: TJL.N0000; S&P Sri Lanka 20 Index component
- ISIN: LK0394N00003
- Industry: Apparel
- Founded: 2000; 26 years ago
- Headquarters: Avissawella, Sri Lanka
- Key people: Ajit Gunewardene (Chairman); Pubudu de Silva (CEO)
- Revenue: ▲LKR49,587 million (2022)
- Operating income: ▲LKR2,573 million (2022)
- Net income: ▲LKR2,531 million (2022)
- Total assets: ▲LKR59,893 million (2022)
- Total equity: ▲LKR28,225 million (2022)
- Owners: Brandix Lanka Limited (32.40%); Pacific Textured Jersey (27.34%)
- Number of employees: ▲2,819 (2022)
- Subsidiaries: Teejay Lanka Prints; Ocean Mauritius Limited; Teejay India
- Website: www.teejay.com

Teejay Lanka PLC formerly known as Textured Jersey Lanka is a knitted fabric manufacturer in Sri Lanka and is one of the constituents of the S&P Sri Lanka 20 Index of the Colombo Stock Exchange. The company is a supplier to the brands such as Nike, PVH, L Brands, Marks & Spencer, Decathlon, Lidl, and Calzedonia.

== History ==
In 2000, Textured Jersey Lanka was founded as a joint venture between Linea Clothing and Textured Jersey UK. In 2004, Pacific Textile Holdings acquired Textured Jersey UK's stake in the company. In 2007, shareholding changed with Brandix joining Pacific Textiles, and in 2011 the company was listed publicly. In 2016, the company was rebranded as Teejay Lanka. Sri Lankan business executive, Ajit Gunawardene was appointed as the chairman of the company in 2022.

== Operations ==
The company carries out manufacturing operations in Sri Lanka as well as in India. During the pandemic Tejay Lanka moved to manufacture personal protective equipment or PPE as a strategic decision.

== Legal issues ==
On August 10, 2020, the Colombo Magistrate Court issued a notice on the company to appear before the court in connection to an alleged attempt to dump hazardous waste into the ocean through a contract.

== Recognition ==
The company received the award of the best textile exporter in Sri Lanka at the Presidential Export Awards in 2019 and ranked amongst the 100 most respected companies in the country by the LMD magazine. In 2021, Teejay Lanka won the award for the best textile exporter at the Presidential Export Awards for the third consecutive year.

== See also ==
- List of Sri Lankan public corporations by market capitalisation
- Apparel industry of Sri Lanka
