= Ada Derana Sri Lankan of the Year =

- Current: 2nd Ada Derana Sri Lankan of the Year
- Awarded for: Excellence in international recognition
- Country: Sri Lanka
- Presented by: TV Derana
- First award: 2016
- Final award: 20 September 2017
- Website: www.adaderana.lk

Ada Derana Sri Lankan of the Year (Sinhala: අද දෙරණ වසරේ ශ්‍රී ලාංකිකයා) is an annual award presented to Sri Lankans who have raised Sri Lanka's profile in the international arena through their careers and lifted the name Sri Lanka globally. The awards are presented by the Sri Lankan television channel TV Derana. The awards were established in 2016 and are presented in a number of categories including arts, sports and civil servants.

== 2016 awards ==
- Sports – Matthew Abeysinghe (swimming)
- Global Entertainer – Jacqueline Fernandez (film actress)
- Entrepreneur – W. K. H. Wegapitiya
- Classical Entertainer – Arunthathy Sri Ranganathan
- Entertainer / Popular Category – Bathiya and Santhush (music)
- Global Businessman – Merrill Joseph Fernando
- Global Scientist – Malik Peiris
- Popular Award – Kumar Sangakkara (cricket)
- Special Award – Jayanthi Kuru-Utumpala (mountain climbing)
- Public Service – Mahinda Deshapriya
- Unsung Hero – Ajith C. S. Perera/ Princy Mangalika/ Wilbert Ranasinghe
- Gallant Soldier – Personnel Representing the Tri-Forces
- ICON of the Year – Kumar Sangakkara

== 2017 awards ==
2nd awards ceremony.

- Sports – Dinesh Priyantha (Paralympic javelin throw)
- Entertainer Classical Category – Ravibandu Vidyapathi (dancing)
- Entertainment Distinguished Achievement – Iranganie Serasinghe (cinema)
- Entrepreneur – Aban Pestonjee
- Global Businessman – Mahesh Amalean (MAS Holdings)
- Global Scientist – Chandra Wickramasinghe (astrobiology)
- Global Entertainer – Rohan de Silva (music)
- Global Professional – Cecil Balmond
- Popular Category – Chamara Weerasinghe (music)
- Public Service – Gamini Wijesinghe
- Unsung Hero – Lily Violet/ Thilini Nadeeka Shalwin
- Bravery Award – Naveen Danushka/ Nihal Sarath Kumara/ Eranga Wikumsiri
- Lifetime Achievement – Lester James Peries (cinema)
- ICON of the Year – Muttiah Muralitharan (cricket)

== 2018 awards ==
3rd awards ceremony.

- Sports – Dilantha Malagamuwa (motor racing) / Anusha Koddithuwakku (boxing)
- Entertainer Classical Category – Rohana Weerasinghe (music)
- Entertainment Distinguished Achievement – Channa Wijewardena (dancing)
- Entrepreneur – M.G Kularatne (MAGA Engineering)
- Global Businessman – Ashroff Omar (Brandix)
- Global Scientist – Prof. Gehan Amaratunga (physics)
- Emerging Global Scientist – Asha de Vos (marine biology)
- Global Entertainer – Alston Koch (music) / B. H. Abdul Hameed (media)
- Global Professional – Ranjan Madugalle (cricket)
- Global Inventor – Bandula Wijay (doctor)
- Special Honorary Award – Johann Peries (hiking) / Col. Rathnapriya Bandu (military) / Sri Lanka national netball team
- Public Service – Samantha Gunasekara (conservationist)
- Unsung Hero – Martin Wijesinghe
- Bravery Award – Sergeant Dilan Sampath (police) / Keerthi Bandara Padmasiri (driver) / Tharindu Weerasinghe & Sachintha Lakshan
- Lifetime Achievement – Vajira Chitrasena (dancing)
