= Doug Barrowman =

Scottish businessman (born 1965)

- Born: Douglas Alan Barrowman; 1 March 1965 (age 61); Glasgow, Scotland
- Education: University of Glasgow (B.Acy.)
- Occupation: Businessman
- Spouse: Michelle Mone (m. 2020)
- Children: 4

Douglas Alan Barrowman (born 1 March 1965) is a Scottish businessman. He founded the Knox Group of Companies and has invested in Ve Interactive, Aston Ventures and Equi Capital.

In 2022, in a series of investigative pieces, The Guardian reported that Barrowman, Mone and their children had secretly received £45.8 million in payments to offshore accounts from government PPE contracts, which they had lobbied for during the COVID-19 pandemic. The police launched an investigation into Barrowman's activities in January 2022.

On 17 December 2023, Barrowman denied any wrongdoing when interviewed with his wife on BBC's Sunday with Laura Kuenssberg. He explained that as a businessman and Isle of Man resident he had led a consortium that were awarded UK PPE contracts. He stated neither his wife or children had received proceeds from the business deal but admitted that profits had been placed in a Trust from which they might benefit upon his death.

== Early life ==
Barrowman was born on 1 March 1965 in Glasgow, Scotland. He was raised in Simshill, before moving to Rutherglen at the age of 13, where he attended King's Park Secondary School. He later attended Glasgow University, graduating with a Bachelor of Accountancy degree in 1985.

== Career ==
=== Early career ===
After graduating, Barrowman completed his professional examinations and qualified as a chartered accountant. He worked for 3i, a private equity fund. Barrowman resigned from 3i in 1992, to set up his own corporate finance practice during the 1990s. He exited from the practice in 1999.

=== Aston Ventures ===
In 1999, Barrowman founded Aston Ventures, a private investment vehicle. Over the next ten years, Aston Ventures made 13 acquisitions of "old economy" businesses, including the third largest cable making company in the world, B3 Cables, with a total turnover of about £400 million over that period.

=== The Knox Group ===
In 2008, Barrowman moved to the Isle of Man and founded The Knox Group of Companies which owned several businesses, including Aston Ventures. Barrowman was also a director of Aston Management Ltd (AML), which provided tax advice and offshore loan schemes to freelance workers including social workers, locum doctors, nurses and engineers. AML's services came under scrutiny after the UK government announced in 2017 that it would be claiming back tax from 50,000 scheme users through the Loan Charge measure, leading to criticism in the House of Commons. AML ceased trading in 2010 before the tax rules changed.

In October 2020, a BBC report highlighted how thousands of AML customers were left facing a retrospective Loan Charge by HMRC. In January 2024, the Daily Mail published an article that claimed Barrowman made £300 million from dubious tax-avoidance schemes that ruined thousands and led to two suicides. Barrowman subsequently complained to the Independent Press Standards Organisation that this Daily Mail article breached Clause 1 (Accuracy) of the Editors’ Code of Practice but the complaint was not upheld.

In 2011 Barrowman co-founded the KHG Private Equity Fund.

==== VE Interactive ====
VE Interactive collapsed into insolvency in 2018. Barrowman and other directors bought the insolvent company for £2m but the directors were removed by a court following accusations they botched the sale. The High Court of Justice case shone a light on controversial “pre-pack” administrations that allow companies to go bust, shed their debts and immediately be sold.

==== Pitch@Palace ====
In 2021, Knox House Trustees (UK) became the legal owner for Andrew Mountbatten-Windsor's company Pitch@Palace Global Limited. Barrowman's lawyer told the BBC in 2025 that he "at no time... had any business or personal involvement with the duke". Arthur Lancaster, an accountant and tax adviser with ties to both Mountbatten-Windsor and Knox Group, was appointed as director of Pitch@Palace Global in December 2020. He has served as director at several companies connected to Knox Group, including companies involved in the AML tax avoidance case, Knox House Trustees (UK), and PPE Medpro. As its sole director, Lancaster filed for dissolution of the company in November 2025.

=== Financial Provisions Solutions ===
Knox Group owned Financial Provisions Solutions, which went into voluntary liquidation in January 2019. In December 2022, the Daily Record reported that Army veterans lost tens of thousands of pounds when they transferred out of the final salary Army scheme to Financial Provisions Solutions.

=== Other business activities ===
In 2017, Barrowman became the interim chairman of Ve Interactive, after an emergency cash injection and investment into the firm. In the same year, Aston Plaza and Residences, a residential and commercial property development in Dubai priced in bitcoin, was launched.

=== PPE Medpro ===
The Guardian released a set of articles, first in 2020 and again in November 2022, detailing Barrowman and Mone's implication in lobbying for government PPE contracts during the COVID-19 pandemic in the United Kingdom, and the personal financial rewards they saw from these government contracts. PPE Medpro Limited was incorporated in May 2020 by a consortium of investors led by Barrowman. In June 2020, following a recommendation by Mone, the company was awarded its first government contract worth £80.85m to supply masks to be used by NHS workers. The contract was obtained through a so-called VIP lane, waiving normal requirements for competitive tenders under Covid-19 emergency regulations which allowed the UK government to award contracts directly. Two weeks later, the company was awarded a second contract worth £122m for the supply of sterile gowns. In December 2020, the delivery of the gowns was rejected after more than 70% percent of the gowns tested proved not to be sterile. The DHSC demanded a refund from PPE Medpro and eventually took legal action against the company for breach of contract in 2022.

The National Crime Agency opened a fraud investigation into PPE Medpro in connection with the government PPE contracts in May 2021. As part of this investigation, a UK court ordered in December 2023 that £75 million of assets linked to Barrowman and Mone be placed under restriction ("frozen") following an application by the Crown Prosecution Service. As of October 2025, the NCA's investigation was ongoing.

In October 2022, the Guardian obtained an internal report by HSBC bank which stated that Barrowman had received at least £65 million in profits from PPE Medpro, with £45.8 million transferred to his private offshore accounts. According to the report, Barrowman transferred £28.8m originating from PPE Medpro profits in October 2020 to an offshore trust he set up for his then fiancée Michelle Mone and her adult children as beneficiaries. The trust's bank account had been opened in May 2020, around the time Mone recommended PPE Medpro as a PPE supplier to the government..

Arthur Lancaster was appointed as sole director and shareholder of PPE Medpro in 2023. He was also a director of many of the companies involved in the AML tax avoidance case. In October 2025, the BBC reported that PPE Medpro had been ordered to pay £122m in damages after a judge ruled it breached a government contract for the supply of personal protective equipment (PPE) during the Covid pandemic. The High Court ruled Medpro failed to prove whether or not the surgical gowns it delivered had undergone a validated sterilisation process. PPE Medpro filed for administration on 30 September 2025, one day before the High Court's ruling, and subsequently failed to meet the deadline to repay the amount due. Documents filed by PPE Medpro's administrator in November 2025 showed that the company also owes 39 million in tax to the HMRC.

== Personal life ==
Barrowman has four children from his first two marriages. He married Michelle Mone in 2020.

The Prince's Trust Doug Barrowman Centre in the Ancoats area of Manchester opened in 2019 following a donation by Barrowman of £2 million to the Prince's Trust.

Barrowman has six homes, a collection of fifteen cars and a private jet. He was featured on a 2015 episode of the television series Million Pound Mega Yacht, featuring his 55-metre yacht named Turquoise.
