= Michelle Mone =

British businessperson (born 1971)

The Right Honourable The Baroness Mone OBE
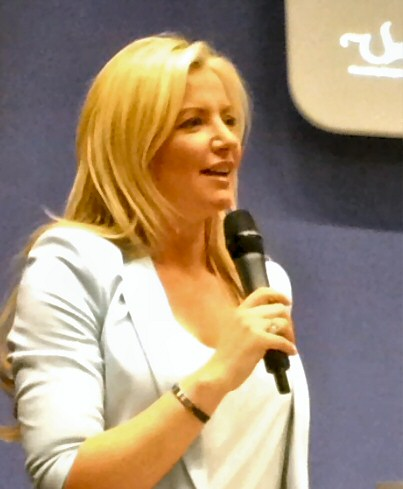
- Mone in 2013

Member of the House of Lords
- Lord Temporal
- Life peerage 30 September 2015

Personal details
- Born: Michelle Georgina Allan; 8 October 1971 (age 55) Glasgow, Scotland
- Party: Independent
- Other political affiliations: Labour (until 2009); Conservative (until 2023)
- Spouses: Michael Mone (m. 1992; div. 2011); Doug Barrowman (m. 2020)
- Occupation: Businesswoman; parliamentarian
- Known for: Founder of Ultimo

Michelle Georgina Mone, Baroness Mone, OBE (née Allan; born 8 October 1971) is a Scottish businesswoman and life peer. She has set up several businesses, including MJM International Ltd in 1996 and the lingerie company Ultimo along with her then husband Michael Mone. Other ventures include naturopathic 'weight-loss' pills, a fake tan product via Ultimo Beauty, overseas residential development and cryptocurrency. Mone became a Conservative life peer in 2015.

During the COVID-19 pandemic, Mone's husband's company, PPE Medpro, was awarded £200 million of contracts to provide personal protective equipment (PPE) by the UK government. The company made a profit of £60 million and some of the products they provided were defective and went unused. From 2020 to 2023, Mone vehemently denied that she or her husband had any involvement with the contracts. In January 2022, the House of Lords Commissioner for Standards and National Crime Agency launched investigations into Mone's links to the contracts. Mone announced in December that year that she was taking a leave of absence from the House of Lords "to clear her name" amid the allegations. Shortly afterwards the UK government announced plans to sue PPE Medpro for £122 million plus costs over the defective items.

In December 2023, Mone disclosed that she had been involved with PPE Medpro and claimed she had previously denied it to protect her family. In February 2024, a leak revealed that five months prior to £29 million of PPE Medpro's profits being transferred into a trust that Mone would benefit from, she assured the government that she would not gain "any financial benefit whatsoever", and that there were "no conflicts whatsoever" with regard to the company she had recommended to the government.

== Early life ==
Born on 8 October 1971, Michelle Allan grew up in Dennistoun in the East End of Glasgow. She recounted how she had lived with her family in a one-bedroom house with no bath or shower until she was 10 years old. She also told of how her younger brother, who had spina bifida, died at the age of eight, when she was 10 years old, and that her father, who was suffering from cancer, lost the use of his legs when she was 15.

She left school aged 15, with no qualifications, to pursue a modelling career.

== Business career ==
Mone obtained a marketing job with the Labatt brewing company when she was 19 and, within two years, had risen to become its head of marketing in Scotland. She has since said that she invented qualifications to help get the job there. She was then made redundant by the company, prompting her, at the age of 23, to set up her own business using the redundancy compensation she received from Labatt.

=== MJM International ===
In November 1996, Mone founded MJM International with her then-husband Michael. In August 1999, Mone launched the Ultimo lingerie brand at Selfridges department store in London. Mone came up with the idea for the Ultimo bra, the brand's first product, when she was wearing an uncomfortable cleavage-enhancing bra one day and believed she could create a more comfortable cleavage-enhancing bra. Mone had read about a new silicone product while on holiday in Florida and approached the company to obtain its European licence to produce bras. Mone has claimed that an Ultimo bra was worn by Julia Roberts in the Hollywood film Erin Brockovich, but this was denied by the film's creators. Ultimo went on to include other products, such as backless dresses and shapewear, which led to MJM International's growth.

Mone portrayed herself as rich and successful but the accounts of MJM International show that between 2007 and 2009 she exaggerated about the turnover and number of staff employed by the business. The Independent estimated she would have earned £250k before tax in 2008, but she also borrowed £600k from the business. By 2011 the company had a turnover of £8.4m but was not profitable.

Mone left MJM International briefly in 2013 following the breakdown of her relationship with her then husband. The business assets were transferred to its parent firm, Ultimo Brands International Ltd, in a partnership with MAS Holdings. MJM International was then dissolved. In November 2014, Mone sold 80% of her stake in Ultimo Brands International to MAS Holdings. In 2014, a former operations director for MJM won a claim for unfair dismissal from her company after discovering that Mone had authorised electronic bugging of his office.

Mone threatened to sue her critics when it was revealed her company MJM International had paid a substantial sum of money into a controversial tax avoidance scheme, criticised by Chancellor George Osborne as "morally repugnant". Following a test case brought by HMRC against Rangers Football Club, the scheme utilising an employee benefit trust (the type of tax avoidance scheme used by MJM International) was exposed as ineffective in November 2015. Mone said she had "not done anything wrong" in relation to tax avoidance and that her ex-husband had "dealt with all the finance". In August 2015, Mone resigned her directorships of both MJM and Ultimo, saying she had sold 80% of the latter.

=== TrimSecrets and weight loss ===
TrimSecrets were weight loss pills formulated by the "naturopath" Jan de Vries. The product also used diet and exercise advice. In 2006 MJM formed a joint venture with de Vries, taking a 50% share in the product. Mone claimed that exercise and reduced calorific intake had no effect on her weight and credited TrimSecrets pills for her weight loss. Mone falsely claimed the efficacy of the product had been proven in clinical trials. However, when questioned further, she said that approximately 60 users had completed a questionnaire but was unable to produce the results.

In October 2013, Jan de Vries sold his interest in the company with Mone having 60% of the business and a silent business partner the remaining 40%. In August 2015 it was reported that the company had made a loss in each of the last four years for which accounts were available.

In November 2015, Mone was criticised for using her "Baroness Mone"-styled Twitter account to promote TrimSecrets pills, although a spokesman for Mone said she had disposed of her ownership of the firm before her tweet. A spokesman for the British Dietetic Association said "there is no scientific basis or rationale for these products, they are making claims which are unfounded and feeding into public confusion around nutrition and pseudo-science."

On the ITV programme Loose Women in 2020, Mone said she lost weight during the COVID-19 lockdown by exercising three times a day. She stated: "When I was overweight and in a very uncomfortable horrible marriage, my way of coping with that was to continuously eat."

=== Ultimo Beauty/Ubeauty Global ===
In 2012 Mone's company, Ultimo Beauty, launched a fake tan product. In 2014 when announcing that she had sold most of her stake in Ultimo, she confirmed she had taken 100% control of Ubeauty Global, consisting of the assets of Ultimo Beauty.

In 2016, after she was made a peer, Mone changed the company formation so that it no longer had to publish public trading accounts. In February 2017 accounts for the company were published, covering the time from 2014 to 2016 and it was revealed the company had assets of £23,000. In March 2017, Mone announced that she had sold the company.

=== Aston Plaza development ===
In 2017, Mone and her partner Doug Barrowman launched a £250 million residential development in Dubai which they claimed was to be the "first-ever development to be priced in bitcoin". In April 2019, The Sunday Times reported that the development was "on hold" with the construction incomplete, while a spokesman for Mone said that it was going "extremely well" and was in the process of being redesigned.

=== Equi cryptocurrency ===
In 2018, Mone and her partner Doug Barrowman launched a cryptocurrency called Equi through a company called Equi Capital. It aimed to raise $US80 million which would be invested in startup companies. Mone described herself as "one of the biggest experts in Cryptocurrency and Blockchain" and promoted the project as the "bitcoin of Britain". The company recruited 1,000 people to promote the cryptocurrency through social media, but they only raised £1,600. According to Barrowman, £5.4 million of tokens were sold in a "pre-sale offering" but the public sale beginning in March 2018 raised only £540,000. By August 2018, The Sunday Times reported that the project had "flopped" and all investors had been refunded. The Financial Times reported that it had "ended in a fiasco that exposes the total absence of oversight in the ICO market".

== Media appearances ==
Mone was profiled in 2002 in a BBC Two documentary, Trouble at the Top: Boom or Bust. She was a presenter on a 2005 BBC One series of programmes, Mind Your Own Business, in which she gave advice to a number of small businesses. Mone appeared on nine episodes of BBC Two's The Apprentice: You're Fired! between 2007 and 2009, and was a contestant on a 2009 celebrity edition of The Apprentice. She appeared as a contestant on an ITV show, 71 Degrees North in 2010. She was a contestant on Celebrity MasterChef in 2011. She was the subject of a BBC Radio 4 profile in 2015 on taking up a role as a government entrepreneurship tsar.

== Political career ==
Mone says she previously supported the Labour Party, as did her family, but withdrew her support in 2009 after the prime minister, Gordon Brown, increased the top income tax rate to 50%, also indicating that she would leave the UK. She further stated that Brown and his government mismanaged the country's finances during the 2008 financial crisis.

During the London riots in August 2011, Mone called for the army to be brought in and tweeted "People who riot, steal, cover face deserve zero human rights". In January 2012, she gave an interview to The Sunday Times stating her intention to move herself and her business to England were Scotland to become independent following the 2014 referendum on the issue. However, despite Scotland voting No in the referendum, Mone confirmed a few months later that she was leaving Scotland.

On 10 August 2015, the government announced that Mone would lead a two-part review into entrepreneurship and small businesses, particularly focusing upon setting up small businesses in deprived areas, under the Work and Pensions Secretary, Iain Duncan Smith. On 27 August 2015, the prime minister, David Cameron, announced a list of new creations of life peers, including Mone. Her inclusion drew criticism from other business leaders. Some Conservatives questioned her suitability for the House of Lords.

Mone was criticised on Twitter when her first vote in the House of Lords was to vote against a motion to delay government cuts to tax credits of around £1,300 a year for three million low-income families. Mone responded to the controversy by tweeting that people should "work hard" and not "look for excuses" for their own poverty. In October 2016 she said that she was wrong to support the cuts and she regretted the way she voted.

=== Attendance in House of Lords ===
In her maiden speech in the House of Lords, Mone stated: "I look forward to playing a full and active role in your lordships' house". The Times reported in 2018 that in the previous year, Mone had only attended the House of Lords on 12% of the days in which it was sitting, missing important debates including on the Brexit bill. Her low attendance led SNP MSP Rona Mackay to describe her as the "Layabout Lady of Mayfair" and businessman Douglas Anderson, who had criticised her original appointment, called for her to resign. By early 2022, Mone had made only five speeches in the House of Lords and asked 22 written questions. In December 2022, Mone's spokesperson said she was taking a leave of absence from the House of Lords in order to "clear her name" of allegations [see PPE Medpro controversy, below] that had been "unjustly levelled against her". At that time, Mone had not spoken in a debate since March 2020 and had last voted in April 2022.

=== PPE Medpro controversy ===
PPE Medpro Limited was incorporated on 12 May 2020 as a private limited company in England and Wales, registered to an address on the Isle of Man, at that time wholly owned and controlled by Anthony Page. Page had business connections with both Mone and her husband, Doug Barrowman. On the same day that PPE Medpro was incorporated, Page resigned as business as secretary for MGM Media, the company owned in whole by Mone that manages and receives payment for Mone's branding and media engagements. Page also was a company director of the Knox House Trust until September 2022. The Knox House Trust, wholly owned by Barrowman, has two divisions; one providing offshore wealth management services to high net worth clients, and the second, which was run by Page, is Barrowman's “family office”, also known as the Knox family office, which oversees his and his family's financial affairs.

On 12 June 2020, PPE Medpro was awarded its first contract to supply personal protective equipment (PPE) to the NHS COVID-19 pandemic after one month of incorporation. This first contract was valued at £80.85m for the supply of 210m facemasks. Two weeks later, the company secured its second contract valued at £122m for the supply of 25m surgical gowns. The government awarded both contracts for PPE without competitive tenders under COVID-19 emergency regulations that waived normal requirements.

The Guardian later reported that throughout 2020 lawyers acting for both Mone and Barrowman "consistently and emphatically" denied any involvement with PPE Medpro when questioned; in November 2020, Mone's lawyer told The Guardian that Mone "is not connected in any way with PPE Medpro". Barrowman's lawyers repeatedly denied that he was an investor in the company or a consortium supporting it, and said he "never had any role or function in PPE Medpro". In December 2020, a lawyer instructed by Mone and Barrowman told The Guardian that "any suggestion of an association" between Mone and PPE Medpro was "inaccurate", "misleading" and "defamatory".

In November 2021, a Freedom of Information request revealed that Mone personally recommended the company to the government by lobbying Theodore Agnew (then the Minister of State for Efficiency and Transformation and cabinet minister responsible for procurement during the COVID-19 pandemic) and cabinet minister Michael Gove (then the chair of the COVID-19 operations subcommittee) through its VIP fast-track lane for firms with political connections and that the company was awarded £200 million in government contracts. This high-priority process was set up in the early stages of the COVID-19 pandemic in order to bypass the normal competitive tender process for procurement that was considered urgent. It further emerged in January 2022 that Mone personally recommended Medpro for a government contract five days before PPE Medpro had been formed; in one key email, sent on 8 May 2020, Mone, using her private email address, proposed supplying large quantities of PPE face masks to the government, saying they could be sourced through “my team in Hong Kong”.

Despite Mone first claiming her involvement in the company went no further than a single recommendation, many further emails detailed extensive lobbying of multiple ministers and staff for months. Leaked WhatsApp messages seen by The Guardian appeared to show Mone further discussing intimate details of the orders including the size of garments that formed part of a contract. Mone was also shown to have lobbied for LFI Diagnostics, a company established as a secret entity of her husband Barrowman's family office, Knox family office. Lawyers for Mone and her husband denied the allegations. An unnamed source told The Guardian that Mone was "in a class of her own in terms of the sheer aggression of her advocacy" for LFI Diagnostics. Mone's lobbying of government was later described as bullying and hectoring ministers by Whitehall, and with her lobbying later accused of being "extraordinarily aggressive" and "threatening" by Matt Hancock, the then Minister of Health.

Following a complaint by the Labour peer George Foulkes, the House of Lords commissioner for standards launched an investigation into the relationship between Mone and PPE Medpro in January 2022. On 27 April 2022, Mone's homes in London and on the Isle of Man and associated business addresses were raided by the police, who launched an investigation into potential fraud. The National Crime Agency is pursuing a tandem investigation into PPE Medpro. It was reported that the NCA is liaising with the Crown Prosecution Service and could, ultimately, seek to bring charges under bribery or fraud laws.

In November 2022, The Guardian reported that an Isle of Man trust, of which Mone and her adult children are beneficiaries, had received £29 million originating from PPE Medpro via a series of offshore transactions involving Barrowman. Her lawyer had previously said she did not declare PPE Medpro in the House of Lords register of financial interests as "she did not benefit financially and was not connected to PPE Medpro in any capacity." The Financial Times reported that according to a leaked HSBC report, the bank had frozen bank accounts linked to Mone and Barrowman in 2020 during an investigation into possible corruption in securing government contracts. The bank accounts were unfrozen in November 2020 after assurances from Barrowman that neither Barrowman nor Mone had any role advising UK government officials on PPE procurement and that Mone had no involvement in the business activities of PPE Medpro. Despite such denials, the HSBC report also documented Mone telling the bank that she and Barrowman advised government ministers on procurement, with Mone complaining that the frozen accounts were damaging PPE Medpro “indicating [she] may indeed have had an interest” in the supplier.

On 6 December 2022, Mone's spokesperson said she was taking a leave of absence from the House of Lords with immediate effect "in order to clear her name of the allegations that have been unjustly levelled against her."

On 19 December 2022, it emerged that the government would sue PPE Medpro for £122 million plus costs. The government said that medical gowns which were supplied by the company "did not comply with the specification in the contract" and could not be used in the NHS. PPE Medpro said it would "rigorously" defend the claim.

In November 2023, after three years of denials, Mone acknowledged via The Guardian that both herself and Barrowman were involved with PPE Medpro. The couple then appeared in a BBC interview in December 2023 where they apologised for lying about their role in the business deals, and having previously denied financial gain from the contracts, admitted that Mone and her children were beneficiaries; however, as for any wrongdoing, Mone said: "I don't honestly see there is a case to answer. I can't see what we have done wrong."

Also in December 2023, as part of a public relations media "fightback” a PPE Medpro-commissioned and funded documentary (titled The Interview: Baroness Mone and the PPE Scandal) was released on YouTube, produced by the investigative journalist Mark Williams-Thomas. Besides film production, Williams-Thomas, a former police officer, had also been employed as private investigator to help try to identify the suspected source of articles in The Guardian that revealed that Mone and Barrowman had been lying to the public. The PPE Medpro-funded documentary came in for other criticism after two participants in the film told The Sunday Times that they had not been informed during production that the film was funded by PPE Medpro.

On 26 January 2024, assets controlled by Mone and her husband were frozen under a court order obtained by the Crown Prosecution Service. The Financial Times reported that restrictions had been placed over £75m worth of assets, including a townhouse in Belgravia, properties in Glasgow, an estate on the Isle of Man and numerous bank accounts.

In June 2024, it was reported that a 46-year-old man, who was not named, had been arrested in connection with the criminal investigation into PPE Medpro, on suspicion of conspiracy to commit fraud and attempting to pervert the course of justice.

On 1 October 2025, the High Court ruled that PPE Medpro had breached its £122 million contract with the Department of Health and Social Care to supply 25 million sterile surgical gowns during the COVID-19 pandemic. Justice Cockerill found that the gowns failed to meet validated sterilisation standards and lacked required certification, rendering them unsuitable for NHS use. PPE Medpro was ordered to repay £121,999,219 in damages by 15 October.

== Awards and recognition ==
On 21 November 2002, Paisley University awarded her an honorary doctorate. Mone was appointed Officer of the Order of the British Empire (OBE) for her "services to the lingerie industry" in the 2010 New Year Honours.

After consultation with the College of Arms, on 30 September 2015, she was created a life peer as Baroness Mone, of Mayfair in the City of Westminster. She was introduced in the House of Lords on 15 October by fellow Conservative peers Lord Freud and Baroness Morris of Bolton.

She was recognised as one of the BBC's 100 women of 2017.

== Personal life ==
Aged 17, Allan met her future husband, Michael Mone, and by 18 was pregnant with her first child, Rebecca. She then converted from Protestantism to Catholicism and married Michael, an anaesthetist's son from a Catholic family in 1992. She divorced Michael Mone in December 2011.

In November 2013 Mone gave Hello! a tour of her home in Glasgow and falsely claimed that Albert Einstein once lived there. When questioned about this claim by The National in 2023, she threatened to take legal action against the newspaper.

Mone's autobiography, My Fight to the Top, was published in 2015.

On 26 December 2018, Mone announced her engagement to Scottish businessman Douglas Barrowman. They were married on 29 November 2020.

In December 2021, a wealth manager of Indian heritage accused Mone of sending racist text messages to him after the two were involved in a 2019 yachting incident in Monaco, which resulted in the death of a person. He said that Mone called him "a waste of a man's white skin" via text. A spokesperson for Mone said she was not a racist and "Baroness Mone and her husband have built over 15 schools in Africa in the past three years"; this was followed by a message from her lawyers, who said that Mone could not access her messages and had no "detailed memory of them". Mone's spokesperson said it was "illogical she would have made such a comment or made it with the slightest racist intent as, at the time, she had no knowledge that the complainant was anything other than white British, as his appearance is 100% white, with a cut-glass English accent." The allegations of racism were referred to the House of Lords Commissioner for Standards, but commissioners did not investigate the matter as Mone's comments were said in a personal capacity and not in her capacity as a member of the House of Lords. In January 2022, the Metropolitan Police announced they were investigating the incident after receipt of an allegation of a racially aggravated malicious communication. In August 2022, Mone reached a settlement "on a no fault or damages basis in relation to the alleged racist claim", according to The Guardian; the settlement also involved a payment to the other party.

Mone and Barrowman own the Ballakew estate in St. Mark's on the Isle of Man. The estate is set over 154 acres. The nine-bedroomed house was described by Country Life as having "a list of leisure facilities which would make a 5-star hotel blush" with "tennis courts, helipad and grand architecture which will turn heads". The house also has an indoor pool and an amphitheatre. It was put up for sale in 2019 for £25 million.
