= M. C. Ahamed =

Sri Lankan politician (1931–2008)

Hon. Mohamed Cassim Ahamed MP

Member of the Ceylon Parliament for Kalmunai
- In office 20 July 1960 – 22 March 1965
- Preceded by: M. S. Kariapper
- Succeeded by: M. S. Kariapper
- In office 18 February 1968 – 21 July 1977
- Preceded by: M. S. Kariapper
- Succeeded by: A. R. Mansoor

Personal details
- Born: 20 February 1931 Kalmunai, British Ceylon
- Died: 3 July 2008 (aged 77) Colombo, Sri Lanka
- Party: Sri Lanka Freedom Party
- Other political affiliations: Illankai Tamil Arasu Kachchi; Independent
- Spouse: Seyathu Natchi Sehulebbe
- Children: 9
- Profession: Politician

Mohamed Cassim Ahamed (20 February 1931 – 3 July 2008), commonly known as M. C. Ahamed or M. C. Ahmed, was a Sri Lankan politician who represented the Kalmunai electorate in the Parliament of Ceylon. He also served as chairman of the Kalmunai Town Council.

Ahamed was initially associated with the Illankai Tamil Arasu Kachchi, commonly known as the Federal Party, and later joined the Sri Lanka Freedom Party (SLFP). He served in Parliament from July 1960 until March 1965 and again from February 1968 until July 1977.

He was regarded as a close political associate of Prime Minister Sirimavo Bandaranaike and was known for serving people from different ethnic and religious communities.

== Early life and family ==
Ahamed was born on 20 February 1931 to Mohamed Cassim Kariapper, who was originally from Kalmunai, and Madania Kariapper, a sister of politician M. S. Kariapper. He had two sisters and one brother. His parents died when he was young, and he was subsequently raised by his maternal uncle.

Ahamed belonged to the Kariapper family, a prominent political family from Sri Lanka's Eastern Province. M. S. Kariapper was his maternal uncle, while M. H. M. Ashraff, the founder of the Sri Lanka Muslim Congress, was his cousin.

He married Seyathu Natchi Sehulebbe, who died in 1993. The couple had nine children, one of whom died approximately two months after birth. Their daughter Sabriya died in 2004. Ahamed had several grandchildren and great-grandchildren at the time of his death.

His son-in-law, M. M. Mustapha, also served as a member of Parliament.

== Political career ==
Ahamed first contested the Kalmunai electorate as an independent candidate at the March 1960 Ceylonese parliamentary election. He received 1,280 votes but was not elected.

At the July 1960 Ceylonese parliamentary election, Ahamed contested as a candidate of the Federal Party against his maternal uncle, M. S. Kariapper. Ahamed received 7,616 votes and defeated Kariapper, who received 5,651 votes.

At the 1965 Ceylonese parliamentary election, Ahamed contested as an independent candidate. M. S. Kariapper regained the Kalmunai seat, receiving 6,726 votes, while Ahamed received 5,838 votes.

Kariapper was subsequently disqualified from Parliament after being found guilty of accepting a bribe, resulting in a vacancy in the Kalmunai seat.

Ahamed contested the resulting by-election on 18 February 1968 as the SLFP candidate. He received 10,599 votes and defeated Federal Party candidate Masoor Moulana by a majority of 1,254 votes.

According to a commemorative article published in Thinakaran, Ahamed's victory in the 1968 Kalmunai by-election contributed to a growing nationwide wave of support for the Sri Lanka Freedom Party and helped create the political momentum that preceded the SLFP-led coalition's landslide victory at the 1970 general election.

At the 1970 Ceylonese parliamentary election, Ahamed retained the Kalmunai seat as an SLFP candidate. He received 8,779 votes, defeating A. R. Mansoor, who received 7,827 votes, and Federal Party candidate A. Udumalebbe, who received 4,960 votes.

Ahamed remained the member of Parliament for Kalmunai until the 1977 Sri Lankan parliamentary election, when the seat was won by A. R. Mansoor. Ahamed received 5,922 votes at the election. In total, he served in Parliament for approximately 17 years.

Ahamed initially represented the Federal Party but later left the party because of political differences. He subsequently sat as an independent member before contesting elections as an SLFP candidate.

During his parliamentary career, Ahamed also served as chairman of the Kalmunai Town Council. At the time, parliamentarians were permitted to hold positions in local government while serving in Parliament.

== Public service and achievements ==
Ahamed was associated with several educational, institutional, agricultural, healthcare and infrastructure-development initiatives in Kalmunai and the wider Ampara District.

=== Education ===
Ahamed played a leading role in the establishment and development of Mahmud Ladies' College in Kalmunai and strongly promoted women's education. At a time when educational opportunities for girls in the predominantly Muslim area were limited, his efforts helped expand access to education for women in Kalmunai and neighbouring towns.

During his tenure, science subjects were introduced at the GCE Advanced Level at Zahira College, Kalmunai. This enabled students from the school to pursue higher education in fields such as medicine and engineering.

Ahamed also helped secure funding for the establishment and development of science laboratories. Through the Ministry of Education, he supported the appointment of qualified teachers from outside the area to strengthen science education in local schools.

His educational initiatives were not limited to the Kalmunai electorate. He also assisted schools elsewhere in the Ampara District in obtaining science laboratories, teachers and other educational resources through the Ministry of Education.

In 1974, Ahamed spoke in Parliament about the need to establish a university in Sri Lanka's Eastern Province.

=== Government institutions and local development ===
Through Ahamed's efforts, several government institutions and state-sector organisations commenced operations in Kalmunai, including the People's Bank, the Co-operative Wholesale Establishment (CWE) and Salu Sala.

These institutions expanded access to banking, consumer goods and public services for residents of Kalmunai and surrounding areas. He also assisted people from the region in obtaining employment in government institutions and other sectors.

=== Infrastructure and agriculture ===
Ahamed supported the construction and improvement of roads and bridges and the expansion of the Kalmunai bazaar.

He also promoted the construction and improvement of drainage and irrigation canals to reduce flooding and support agricultural cultivation in the area.

=== Healthcare ===
Ahamed advocated for the establishment of a fully equipped hospital in Kalmunai. As sufficient funding was not made available by the Ministry of Health at the time, he used funds allocated to the Kalmunai Town Council to support the establishment of an Ayurvedic hospital.

The development of a fully equipped hospital in Kalmunai was later advanced through the efforts of M. H. M. Ashraff and A. H. M. Fowzie. The hospital subsequently became known as the Ashraff Memorial Hospital.

=== Fisheries ===
To support the development of the local fisheries industry, Ahamed facilitated the provision of some of the first motorised fishing boats to fishermen in the area.

== Recognition and legacy ==
In November 2007, Ahamed was honoured at a felicitation ceremony held at the Town Hall in Kalmunai in recognition of his public service. At the ceremony, Minister D. M. Jayaratne stated that Ahamed had served the people of the Ampara District for more than 17 years and had treated members of minority communities equally.

The event recognised Ahamed's service to people from different ethnic and religious communities in the Eastern Province.

Ahamed has also been described in a Tamil commemorative article as a leading figure in the modern development and social advancement of Kalmunai.

== Personal life and death ==
Ahamed continued to live with his family following his retirement from active politics. He died in Colombo on 3 July 2008 at the age of 77. He was survived by his children, grandchildren and great-grandchildren.
