= Kalmunai Electoral District =

Electoral district of Sri Lanka

Coordinates: 7.4167°N 81.8167°E

Kalmunai Electoral District was an electoral district of Sri Lanka between August 1947 and February 1989. The district was named after the town of Kalmunai in Ampara District, Eastern Province. The 1978 Constitution of Sri Lanka introduced the proportional representation electoral system for electing members of Parliament. The existing 160 mainly single-member electoral districts were replaced with 22 multi-member electoral districts. Kalmunai electoral district was replaced by the Ampara (Amparai) multi-member electoral district at the 1989 general elections, the first under the PR system, though Kalmunai continues to be a polling division of the multi-member electoral district.

== Members of Parliament ==
Key

Independent ITAK Lanka Prajathanthravadi Pakshaya SLFP UNP

Election	Member	Party	Term
1947	M. S. Kariapper	United National Party	1947-1952
1952	A. M. Merza	Independent	1952-1956
1956	M. S. Kariapper	Illankai Tamil Arasu Kachchi	1956-1960
1960 (March)	M. S. Kariapper	Lanka Prajathanthravadi Pakshaya	1960-1960
1960 (July)	M. C. Ahamed	Illankai Tamil Arasu Kachchi	1960-1965
1965	M. S. Kariapper	Independent	1965-1970
1970	M. C. Ahamed	Sri Lanka Freedom Party	1970-1977
1977	Abdul Rasak Mansoor	United National Party	1977-1989

== Elections ==
=== 1947 Parliamentary General Election ===
Results of the 1st parliamentary election held between 23 August 1947 and 20 September 1947:

Candidate	Party	Symbol	Votes	%
M. S. Kariapper	United National Party	Key	6,886	51.17%
K. Kanapathipillai		Elephant	3,592	26.69%
M. A. L. Kariapper		Hand	2,978	22.13%
Valid Votes			13,456	100.00%
Rejected Votes			406	
Total Polled			13,862	
Registered Electors			22,753	
Turnout			60.92%	

=== 1952 Parliamentary General Election ===
Results of the 2nd parliamentary election held between 24 May 1952 and 30 May 1952:

Candidate	Party	Symbol	Votes	%
A. M. Merza	Independent	Star	6,078	42.69%
M. A. I. Kariapper		Pair of Scales	4,414	31.01%
M. S. Kariapper	United National Party	Key	3,744	26.30%
Valid Votes			14,236	100.00%
Rejected Votes			228	
Total Polled			14,464	
Registered Electors			22,120	
Turnout			65.39%	

=== 1956 Parliamentary General Election ===
Results of the 3rd parliamentary election held between 5 April 1956 and 10 April 1956:

Candidate	Party	Symbol	Votes	%
M. S. Kariapper	Illankai Tamil Arasu Kachchi	House	9,464	47.80%
M. A. Abdul Majeed		Tree	6,095	30.78%
N. T. Francis Xavier	Lanka Sama Samaja Party	Key	4,242	21.42%
Valid Votes			19,801	100.00%
Rejected Votes			183	
Total Polled			19,984	
Registered Electors			27,841	
Turnout			71.78%	

M. S. Kariapper defected to the government within six months of the election.

=== 1960 (March) Parliamentary General Election ===
Results of the 4th parliamentary election held on 19 March 1960:

Candidate	Party	Symbol	Votes	%
M. S. Kariapper	Lanka Democratic Party	Umbrella	5,743	41.27%
S. Z. M. M. Moulana	Illankai Tamil Arasu Kachchi	House	5,520	39.67%
M. C. Ahamed		Cockerel	1,280	9.20%
M. A. L. Kariapper		Ladder	1,153	8.29%
C. Cader Mohideen		Pot	219	1.57%
Valid Votes			13,915	100.00%
Rejected Votes			189	
Total Polled			14,104	
Registered Electors			17,762	
Turnout			79.41%	

=== 1960 (July) Parliamentary General Election ===
Results of the 5th parliamentary election held on 20 July 1960:

Candidate	Party	Symbol	Votes	%
M. C. Ahamed	Illankai Tamil Arasu Kachchi	House	7,616	57.41%
M. S. Kariapper	All Ceylon Islamic United Front	Sun	5,651	42.59%
Valid Votes			13,267	100.00%
Rejected Votes			138	
Total Polled			13,405	
Registered Electors			17,762	
Turnout			75.47%	

=== 1965 Parliamentary General Election ===
Results of the 6th parliamentary election held on 22 March 1965:

Candidate	Party	Symbol	Votes	%
M. S. Kariapper	Independent	Umbrella	6,726	35.26%
S. Z. M. M. Moulana	Illankai Tamil Arasu Kachchi	House	6,235	32.69%
M. C. Ahamed	Independent	Cockerel	5,838	30.61%
C. Abdul Cader Mohideen	United National Party	Elephant	275	1.44%
Valid Votes			19,074	100.00%
Rejected Votes			173	
Total Polled			19,247	
Registered Electors			22,363	
Turnout			86.07%	

=== 1970 Parliamentary General Election ===
Results of the 7th parliamentary election held on 27 May 1970:

Candidate	Party	Symbol	Votes	%
M. C. Ahamed	Sri Lanka Freedom Party	Hand	8,779	40.71%
A. R. Munsoor	United National Party	Elephant	7,827	36.29%
A. Udumalebbe	Illankai Tamil Arasu Kachchi	House	4,960	23.00%
Valid Votes			21,566	100.00%
Rejected Votes			107	
Total Polled			21,673	
Registered Electors			24,693	
Turnout			87.77%	

=== 1977 Parliamentary General Election ===
Results of the 8th parliamentary election held on 21 July 1977:

Candidate	Party	Symbol	Votes	%
Abdul Rasak Mansoor	United National Party	Elephant	12,636	48.78%
A. M. Samsudeen	Tamil United Liberation Front (Muslim United Liberation Front)	Sun	7,093	27.38%
Ahamed Mohamed Cassim	Sri Lanka Freedom Party	Hand	5,922	22.86%
Thuraiappa Muthukrishnan		Lamp	253	0.98%
Valid Votes			25,904	100.00%
Rejected Votes			101	
Total Polled			26,005	
Registered Electors			28,826	
Turnout			90.21%	
