= Martin Trust =

American business person

- Born: 1934; Brownsville, Brooklyn, New York
- Died: 12 September 2019 (aged 84–85); Boston, United States
- Occupations: Business person, entrepreneur
- Known for: Father of Apparel industry of Sri Lanka
- Spouse: Dena Trust (m. 1960-2019)

Martin Trust also known as Marty Trust (1934 – 2019) was an American business magnate entrepreneur and philanthropist who was also known for his contributions to the economy of Sri Lanka by modernising the country's apparel industry. He is also known as the 'father of the modern Sri Lankan apparel industry', as he was instrumental in making the country one of the global leaders in the apparel industry. He is still regarded as one of the pioneers of American fashion retail sector. He died on 12 September 2019 at his home at the age of 84 in Boston, US.

== Early life ==
Martin was born in Brooklyn, New York in 1934 in a middle class family. He joined his father Max Trust on his bread truck routes, delivering bread from the factories to restaurants.

== Career ==
He received his Bachelor's degree in mechanical engineering from the Cooper Union for the Advancement of Science and Art and after graduation, he decided to enter into the apparel industry.

He co-founded the MAST Industries with small capital along with his wife in 1970, which later went onto become one of the important fashion industries in US. In 1978, Limited Brands acquired MAST Industries. He also introduced the Martin Trust Center for MIT Entrepreneurship in 1990s which is a scholarship scheme to the Massachusetts Institute of Technology.

Trust began working with the Sri Lankan textiles and apparel companies in 1985. Trust continued to work with those companies, establishing MAST Industries first joint venture with Sri Lanka's Omar Group (formerly called as LM Apparels, part of Brandix) in 1986. In 1987, the MAST Industries under Trust's leadership established another joint venture with Amalean Group of Sri Lanka.

Trust invested in over twenty different businesses in Sri Lanka over a period of thirty years, which enabled the growth in the Sri Lankan economy. In 1994, the Government of Sri Lanka honored him by awarding the title, Sri Lanka Ranjana, for his outstanding and active involvement in the development of the country’s apparel industry. He also founded Trust Family Industries in 2001 and launched Brandot International in the same year.

== Personal life ==
He met Diane, who was later known as Dena, Kagen in 1957, and they married three years later.

== Legacy ==
In 2011, the Massachusetts Institute of Technology (MIT) honored him by giving new services in respect of him.
