= Muslim Nesan =

Arwi-language newspaper in Ceylon

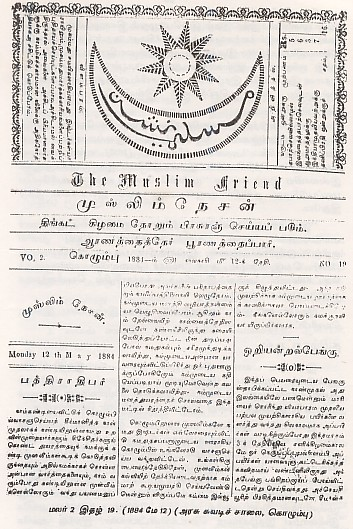
- 1884 issue of Muslim Nesan
- Type: Weekly newspaper
- Editor: M. C. Siddi Lebbe
- Founded: 21 December 1882
- Ceased publication: 1889
- Language: Arwi/English
- Headquarters: Colombo, British Ceylon

Muslim Nesan (مسليم نشن, Tamil: முஸ்லிம் நேசன், "The Muslim Friend") was an Arwi (Arabic Tamil) and English-language weekly newspaper, published from Colombo, British Ceylon between 1882 and 1889. M. C. Siddi Lebbe was the publisher, owner and editor of Muslim Nesan. He founded Muslim Nesan in Kandy in December 1882. The name of the publication was possibly inspired by the journal Ilankai Nesan ("Friend of the Ceylonese") of Arumuka Navalar. In setting up the newspaper Cittilevvai was inspired by the Aligarh Movement, Navalar and Colonel Henry Steel Olcott. The first issue appeared on 21 December 1882.

Muslim Nesan carried news from Muslim countries. The newspaper purposefully sought to politicize the Muslim community. Muslim Nesan had subscribers in Ceylon, South India, Penang and Singapore. Muslim Nesan was, along with Sarvajana Nesan, one of the two most prominent Muslim newspapers in the Tamil-speaking world at the time. Muslim Nesan had a network of correspondents in different parts of South-East Asia. Material from Muslim Nesan was reproduced in other publications, such as Singai Nesan.

Between 1883 and 1885 Muslim Nesan carried a series of articles on the history of Ceylonese Muslims, authored by Cittilevvai. In the page of Muslim Nesan Cittilevvai argued for educational reforms in the Muslim community and reproduced articles by Syed Ahmad Khan, a North Indian social reformer. The newspaper also carried an interview with the exiled Egyptian nationalist leader Ahmed Orabi, soon after his arrival in Ceylon. Cittilevvai also argued in Muslim Nesan that Muslims should adopt Arabic as their day-to-day language.
