= M. S. Kariapper =

Sri Lankan politician, Grandfather of Ruhi Kariapper

Hon. M. S. Kariapper

Member of the Ceylon Parliament for Kalmunai
- In office 20 September 1947 – 30 May 1952
- Succeeded by: A. M. Merza
- In office 10 April 1956 – 20 July 1960
- Preceded by: A. M. Merza
- Succeeded by: M.C. Ahamed
- In office 22 March 1965 – 18 February 1968
- Preceded by: M.C. Ahamed
- Succeeded by: M.C. Ahamed

Personal details
- Born: 29 April 1899
- Died: 17 April 1989 (aged 89)
- Education: Wesley College, Colombo
- Profession: Headmen

Gate Mudaliyar Mohammed Samsudeen Kariapper (1899–1989) was a Sri Lankan headmen and politician. He was the Parliamentary Secretary to the Minister of Justice and Member of Parliament for Kalmunai.

== Early life and government service ==
Kariapper was born in 1899 and educated at Wesley College, Colombo. He served as the Vannia, Karavaku Pattu in the Eastern Province, Sri Lanka and was appointed a Gate Mudaliyar.

== Political career ==
Kariapper was elected to Parliament at the 1947 parliamentary election to represent Kalmunai, as a United National Party candidate. He was defeated at the 1952 parliamentary election.

Kariapper entered local politics and became chairman of Kalmunai Town Council. He was elected to Parliament at the 1956 parliamentary election to represent Kalmunai, this time as an Ilankai Tamil Arasu Kachchi candidate. He crossed over to the government within six months of the election. He was appointed Parliamentary Secretary to the Minister of Justice. He was re-elected to Parliament at the March 1960 parliamentary election, this time as a Lanka Democratic Party candidate.

Kariapper formed the All Ceylon Islamic United Front in 1960 and contested the July 1960 parliamentary election as an ACIUF candidate. He was defeated. In late 1960 he was found guilty of corruption by the Thalagodapitiya Bribery Commission.

Kariapper made a second parliamentary comeback when he was elected to parliament at the 1965 parliamentary election to represent Kalmunai, this time as an independent candidate. However he lost his seat and his civic rights were suspended for seven years following the enactment of the Imposition Of Civic Disabilities (Special Provisions) Act (No. 14 of 1965) based on the Thalagodapitiya Bribery Commission Report.
