= M. C. Siddi Lebbe =

Sri Lankan educator (1838–1898)

M. C. Siddi Lebbe மு.க.சித்திலெப்ப
- Rs. 1 commemorative stamp issued on 11 June 1977
- Born: Mohamed Cassim Siddi Lebbe; 12 June 1838; Kandy, British Ceylon
- Died: 5 February 1898 (aged 59); Kandy, British Ceylon
- Known for: Sri Lankan independence movement
- Parent: Muhammed Lebbe
- Awards: National Hero

Muhammad Cassim Siddi Lebbe (11 June 1838 – 5 February 1898), also known as Mukammatu Kacim Cittilevvai, was a Ceylonese lawyer, educationist, scholar, philosopher, seer, writer, publisher, social reformer, and Muslim community leader.

== Genealogy ==
The Lebbe family claimed ancestry from Arabs who settled on the western coast of Ceylon and later penetrated the Kandyan District, where his father was born. His father, Muhammad Lebbe Siddi Lebbe, was one of the first Ceylonese proctors and was also the Head Moorman in 1833.

== Early life ==
Lebbe was born in Kandy as the third of five siblings. Education was important to his upbringing and he became well-versed in Arabic, Tamil and English. Lebbe found himself a lawyer at 24 and practiced in settings ranging from local municipal courthouses to the Supreme Court to which he was appointed in 1864. Siddi Lebbe had an older brother named Muhammad Lebbe, an Arabic-educated Alim, under whom he learnt to read the Qur'an and study Tamil and English. He was later admitted to the 'General Schooling' and was educated in English.

== Establishments and services ==
- In 1884, he established the first Anglo-Mohammedan school in Colombo with the assistance of Orabi Pasha and Wapichie Marikkar.
- In 1882, he introduced a madrasa called 'Madrasatul Zahira' in Maradana, Colombo. Later in 1892 the 'Madrasatul Zahira' became a school under the name of Zahira College.
- Established schools in Kandy, Gampola, Polgahawela and Kurunegala.
- Founded a Girls' school in Kandy.
- Published the first Muslim journal Muslim Nesan in Tamil language on 12 December 1882.
- Printed school textbooks and distributed them for free to students.
- Established Siddhi Lebbe Maha Vidyalaya, Kandy

His extensive efforts to educate the Muslim community led to the establishment of Zahira College, which gained the support of the community's elite due to the generosity of Wapchi Marikar. He also founded several Tamil and Arabic schools across the Central Province, some of which he personally managed and financed. In Kandy, he established a Girls' School where his sister served as the head teacher. Proficient in Arabic, he studied many significant works of Islamic scholars and possessed religious knowledge that surpassed that of the local Ulema of his time. The educational movement in Colombo, which he initiated with Wapchi Marikar, necessitated his presence in the city, although he occasionally visited his hometown in Kandy.

== Journals and works ==
- Muslim Nesan - "The Muslim Friend" in English and Tamil, aimed at educating the Muslim community.
- Torch of Wishdom - A monthly journal aimed at teaching Muslims Islam and advocated Muslims learn Arabic.
- Gjana Theepan (1892)
- Assan Beyudaya Kadhai (Note: Tamil: அஸன்பேயுடைய கதை, Asaṉpēyudaiya Katai) (1885) - "The Story of Hassan Bey" was the second novel written in Tamil, and the first Tamil novel written in Ceylon. It chronicles an Egyptian protagonist who is kidnapped as a child, and raised in India. The child receives an English education, later returning to Egypt, reuniting with his family.
- Hidayathul Cassimiya
- Tuhuwathul Nahwa - "Key to Grammar"
- Shurut As Salat - "Observance of Prayer"
- Arabic Study Book Part I & II
- Tamil Primer
- History of the Turkish and Greek War
- History of the Moors of Ceylon

He used the medium of newspaper articles, books, and speeches to induce the Muslim community to make an attempt to uplift themselves from the backward condition they were in. Though numerous were his friends and admirers he did have his share of opponents too, who were not convinced of his understanding of the interpretation and philosophical understanding of Islam.

== Legacy ==
Lebbe was made a National Hero by the Central Government for his life and work. A Rs. 1 stamp was issued on June 11, 1977, to commemorate him.

== Bibliography ==
- Citti Levvai Maraikkār; S. M. Kamaludheen (1974). Acaṉpē Carittiram அசன்பே சரித்திரம் [Hassan Bey History] (in Tamil). Tiruchirappalli: Islamiya Ilakkiya Kazhagam.
