= Ghulam Razick =

Sri Lankan cricketer (1942–2019)

Personal information
- Full name: Gnani Seguabdulcader Mohamed Sheni Abdul Razick
- Born: 10 December 1942; Thiruppalaikudi, Madras, India
- Died: 26 October 2019 (aged 76); Colombo, Sri Lanka
- Batting: Right-handed
- Bowling: Right-arm medium-pace

Career statistics
Competition	First-class
Matches	5
Runs scored	80
Batting average	10.00
100s/50s	0/0
Top score	24
Balls bowled	420
Wickets	2
Bowling average	102.50
5 wickets in innings	0
10 wickets in match	0
Best bowling	1/29
Catches/stumpings	6/0
- Source: Cricinfo, 20 January 2020

Gnani Seguabdulcader Mohamed Sheni Abdul Razick, known as Ghulam Razick (10 December 1942 – 26 October 2019) was a cricketer who played for Ceylon in the 1960s.

Ghulam Razick was a hard-hitting right-handed batsman, a right-arm fast-medium bowler and an outstanding slip fieldsman. He attended Zahira College, Colombo, where he captained the cricket team in the 1963–64 season. He played successfully for Moors in senior domestic cricket in Ceylon, and was selected to play for Ceylon. He was less successful at first-class level, but he played a leading part in Ceylon's victory over the touring English team in a one-day match in 1968–69, taking three wickets and scoring the winning runs.

Razick was born in India when his father was there temporarily on business. He continued the family business of manufacturing shoes and running a garment factory. He and his wife Zeenath Munawar had one daughter and two sons.

In September 2018, he was one of 49 former Sri Lankan cricketers honoured by Sri Lanka Cricket for their services before Sri Lanka became a full member of the International Cricket Council.
