= Mahesh Amalean =

Sri Lankan engineer and industrialist

Deshamanya Mahesh Amalean
- Born: 4 April 1955 (age 71)
- Education: National Institute of Technology, Tiruchirappalli; Royal College Colombo
- Occupation: Chairman of MAS Holdings
- Years active: 1978 - present
- Employer: MAS Holdings
- Awards: Deshamanya

Deshamanya Mahesh Amalean (born 4 April 1955) is a Sri Lankan engineer and industrialist. He is the current Chairman of MAS Holdings.

== Early life and education ==
Amalean was born to parents with Gujarati ancestry,. his father was in the family textile business. He studied at Royal College Colombo and graduated from Regional Engineering College, Tiruchirappalli (now known as National Institute of Technology, Tiruchirappalli) with a BTech degree in chemical engineering.

== Career ==
Returning to Sri Lanka in 1978 Amalean took up the family businesses. Thereafter he started a manufacturing company with his brothers named Sigma Industries which began operations in Ratmalana, in August 1985. Moving into the apparel industry he founded MAS Holdings which is a leader in the apparel industry in Sri Lanka catering to major brands such as Victoria's Secret. For his contribution to Sri Lankan industry in 2005 he was conferred with the title of Deshamanya by the government of Sri Lanka.

In 2011, The Open University of Sri Lanka conferred an honorary doctorate (honoris causa) to Mahesh in recognition of his contribution to the country.

Amalean is also one of the five global business leaders recognised with a UN Award at the WEP’s inaugural Leadership Awards presentation where he received the award for Cultural Change for Empowerment. He is also the recipient of the CNBC-IIFA Global Leadership Award and is ranked amongst the Top 20 Progressive Asian Leaders by the World Business Magazine. In 2017, he won Global Businessman award of Ada Derana Sri Lankan of the Year.
