= Bandula Wijay =

Sri Lankan inventor

Bandula Wijerathne
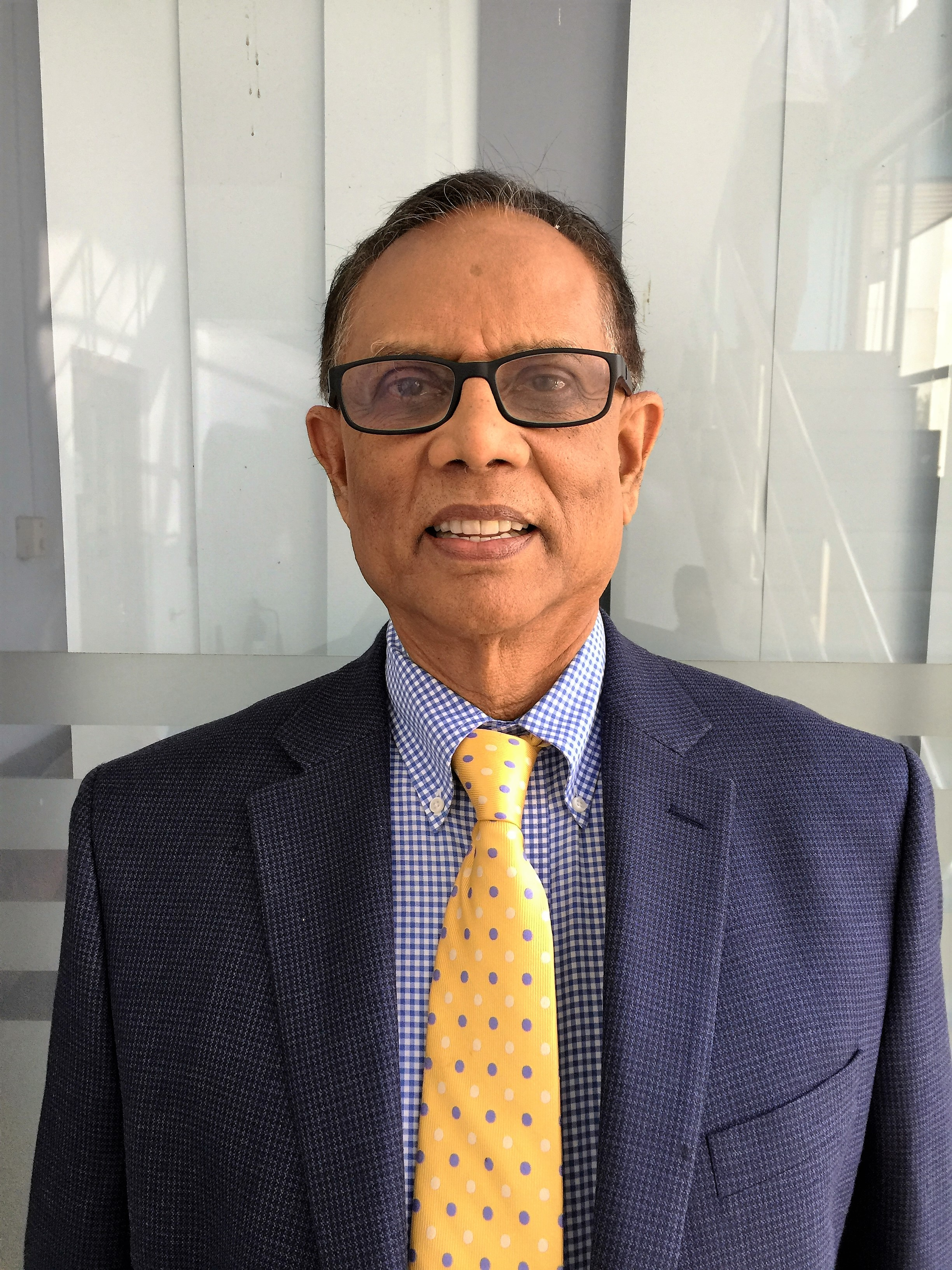
- Born: Bandula Wijayarathna; 1946 (age 79–80); Galle, Sri Lanka
- Education: University of Southern California
- Occupations: Inventor; Engineer; Educator; diplomat
- Years active: 1967–present
- Known for: Inventing Perfusion angioplasty catheter and perfusion pump; Nested loop Stent; Low-profile angiography imaging catheters
- Title: President at LeoMed
- Awards: Vidya Jyothi

Bandula Wijerathne (born 1946 in Galle, Sri Lanka) is a Sri Lankan inventor, businessman, and diplomat who lives in the USA. He also serves as a professor of clinical medicine at the Kotelawala Defense University and he is appointed as an Ambassador for Science Technology and Innovation for Sri Lanka. In addition, Wijay is the current president of LeoMed LLC, a medical device company. Wijay is an expert in innovative cardiovascular.

Wijay has received Lifetime Achievement Award from Maithripala Sirisena, President of Sri Lanka in 2016; Vidya Jyothi award in 2017; and Ada Derana Sri Lankan Global Inventor of the Year in 2018.

== Early life and education ==
Wijay was born in the southern city of Galle in Sri Lanka. His father, Benny Wijayarathna was a principal and his mother Katherina Wijayarathna was the headmistress in a primary school. Wijay attended Mahinda College until he completed the Advanced Level examination. After finishing Advanced Level examination, Wijay attended on an Indian Government Cultural scholarship, India in 1967 to complete a degree in chemical engineering. In 1974, he received the Fulbright Scholarship to pursue higher studies at the University of Southern California, where he first completed a master’s degree in chemical engineering and then a master’s degree in mechanical engineering. Later, he completed his doctorate in chemical engineering from the University of Southern California.

== Career ==
In 1984, he started his entrepreneurial career, Wijay along with Dr. Paolo Angelini of the Texas Heart Institute, developed the angioplasty balloon catheter system along with the coronary artery perfusion pump system to be used during angioplasty.

In 1995, Bandula invented the "Nested Loop" vascular stent, used in treating stenotic arteries after balloon angioplasty.

== Selected awards ==
- 1995: Entrepreneur of the year, by Merrill Lynch
- 1998: Business Professional of the Year from the South Asian Chamber of Commerce
- 2004: Lifetime Achievement Award from the Sri Lanka Foundation
- 2016: Lifetime Achievement Award from Maithripala Sirisena, President of Sri Lanka
- 2017: Vidya Jyothi Award
- 2018: Ada Derana, Global Inventor award
- 2018: Global Citizen award from the United Nations Chapter in Houston, Texas.

== Memberships and appointments ==
- 2012-2017: Honorary Consul of Sri Lanka in Texas by Mahinda Rajapaksa, President of Sri Lanka
- 2013-2016: Visiting Instructor of Bioengineering at the University of Houston (Victoria)
- 2016-2019: Advisor, TMCX
- 2016: Advisor, OPEN Entrepreneurship Network
- 2017: Honorary Professor of Clinical Medicine at the Kotelawala Defense University.
- University of Ruhuna – Advisor for Mechanical Engineering Design Examination
- 2017: The Ambassador for Science, Technology, and Innovation for Sri Lanka by Maithripala Sirisena, President of Sri Lanka
