= Singai Nesan =

Historic Tamil-language newspaper in Singapore

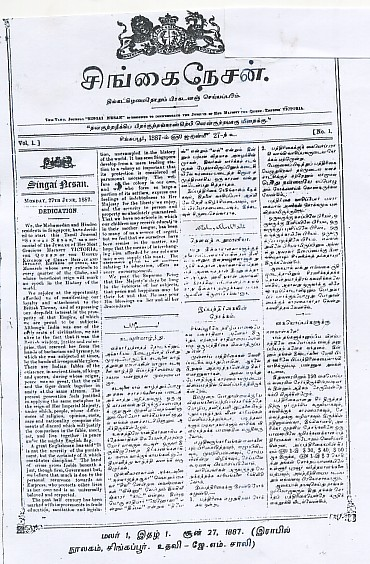
- Cover of first issue of Singai Nesan, 27 June 1887
- Type: Weekly
- Editor: S.K. Makadoom Saiboo
- Founded: 27 June 1887
- Ceased publication: 1890
- Language: Tamil language
- Headquarters: Singapore

Singai Nesan (Tamil: சிங்கை நேசன், English: Singapore Friend, also transliterated as Cinkai Necan) was a Tamil language weekly newspaper published from Singapore from 1887 to 1890. The newspaper also carried material in English and Malay. It is the oldest Tamil newspaper in Singapore of which a substantial number of issues has been saved in archives. The issues of Singai Nesan contains historical material on the religious life of Hindu and Muslim communities of Singapore. S.K. Makadoom Saiboo was the editor of Singai Nesan.

The first issue of the newspaper was published on 27 June 1887, in commemoration of the Golden Jubilee of Queen Victoria. The inaugural issue carried editorial articles in Tamil and English in honour of the Queen. The issue also carried a small editorial in Tamil in tribute to the Ottoman Sultan Abdul Hamid II.

Singai Nesan had the majority of its subscribers in Singapore, but subscribers were also found in Batu Pahat, Klang, Kuala Lumpur, Penang, Siam, Porto-Novo, Sibolga, Padang, Medan, Langkat, Saigon and Melaka. The majority of subscribers were Muslims, but the readership also included Hindus and Christians. It was published by Denodaya Press, which printed both Malay and Tamil literature.

Large chunks of the material printed in Singai Nesan were borrowed from the English-language press and the Reuters agency. Whilst it provided the Colombo-based newspapers Muslim Nesan and Sarvajana Nesan with article material from South-East Asia, the newspaper copied material from them on Middle Eastern affairs.
