= M. M. Zuhair =

Sri Lankan politician

Honourable M. M. Zuhair PC

Sri Lanka Ambassador to Iran
- In office 2006–2012
- President: Mahinda Rajapaksa

Member of Parliament for National List
- In office 1994–2000

Chairman of Rupavahini Corporation
- In office 2004–2006

Personal details
- Born: Mohamed Mohamed Zuhair; June 11, 1947 (age 79) Colombo, Sri Lanka
- Education: Zahira College
- Occupation: Attorney at law

Mohamed Mohamed Zuhair, PC (born 11 June 1947) is a Sri Lankan politician, President's Counsel and former Member of Parliament from the People's Alliance national list from 1990 to 2000.

== Career ==
Zuhair studied at Zahira College, whee he qualified at the G C E (Advanced Level), in 1965. In 1968 he entered the Sri Lanka Law College, where he won the Asia Foundation Scholarship. He passed out as an Advocate in 1970 and was enrolled as an Advocate of the Supreme Court in 1972.

Zuhair was encouraged by the then Senior State Counsel, later Justice P. Ramanathan of the Supreme Court, to join the Attorney-General's Department as a State Counsel, which he joined in 1973. He served the State for nearly ten years, firstly as a State Counsel in the civil division for five years and as a Senior State Counsel and prosecutor in the criminal division during the next five years. He appeared for the State in a large number of cases both civil and criminal. He prosecuted in the High Court in murder cases and appeared in criminal appeals in the Appellate Courts. In 1983, he resigned as Senior State Counsel and returned to private practice.

Zuhair became a Member of Parliament from the People's Alliance National List, nominated by the Sri Lanka Muslim Congress (SLMC), in the Government of Chandrika Bandaranaike Kumaratunga, serving from 1990 to 2000. In 2001, he was appointed a President's Counsel.

From 2004 to 2005, Zuhair served as chairman of the Board of Governors of Zahira College while serving during the same period as the Chairman of the Sri Lanka Rupavahini Corporation.

Following the victory of Mahinda Rajapaksa in the 2005 Presidential Election, he was appointed as chairman of the state-owned Media Rupavahini Corporation.

In 2006, Mr. Zuhair was appointed Sri Lanka's Ambassador to the Islamic Republic of Iran, where he served until 2012. During his tenure as Ambassador to Iran he played a key role in arranging an Iranian credit line that helped Sri Lanka obtain fuel supplies on concessionary terms at a critical stage of the war against the LTTE. The interest-free oil package that he successfully negotiated for Sri Lanka with the then Iranian government headed by President Mahmoud Ahmedinejad brought in much needed Iranian funds, aggregating by August 2008 to US$675 million, helping the cash stricken Sri Lankan governmentsubstantially.

M M Zuhair is also a public speaker and an author.
