= Princy Mangalika =

Sri Lankan social activist

- Born: Ragama, Sri Lanka
- Occupations: entrepreneur, art educator
- Organization: Positive Women's Network
- Awards: Red Ribbon Award

Princy Mangalika is a Sri Lankan social activist and a HIV/AIDS victim who is also well known for her efforts in fighting AIDS infection in Sri Lanka. She is the founder of Positive Women's Network, a NGO which helps people who are infected by the AIDS virus. In March 2019, she was acknowledged as one of twelve female change-makers in Sri Lanka by the parliament, coinciding with International Women's Day.

== Biography ==
Princy was born and raised up in Ragama, Western Province of Sri Lanka. In 2003, she was found to have diagnosed with HIV positive which she had contracted from her husband. She was discriminated in the society ever since becoming a victim to the disease and it inspired her to lay the foundation to the Positive Women's Network. Her husband was infected with the disease while he was working in a hotel in abroad. Her husband committed suicide due to the infection and her family was chased away by the villagers.

== Career ==
Being ill-treated in the society, at the age of 53, she co-founded Positive Women's Network along with a HIV affected doctor Kamalika Abeyratne in 2009 with the aim of taking care of people who are affected by the AIDS. In 2012, her organization Positive Women's Network received the Red Ribbon Award from United Nations for the outstanding community services to the people who are diagnosed with AIDS. She was also honored with the Unsung Heroine award as a part of the Ada Derana Sri Lankan of the Year in 2016.

== See also ==
- List of HIV-positive people
