= All Ceylon Islamic United Front =

- Abbreviation: ACIUF
- Founder: M. S. Kariapper
- Founded: 1960

Election symbol
- Sun

All Ceylon Islamic United Front was a political party in Sri Lanka, founded in 1960 by M. S. Kariapper. It was one of the first Muslim based national political parties formed in the country. The ACIUF contested two seats, Kalmunai and Pottuvil at the July 1960 legislative election, but failed to win either seat. The party was later disbanded.
