= Sarvajana Nesan =

Sri Lankan Arabic-Tamil language newspaper

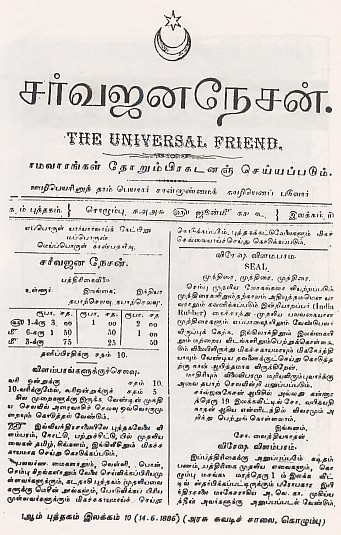
- Cover of Sarvajana Nesan
- Type: Weekly
- Publisher: A.L.C. Mohideen
- Founded: 1886
- Ceased publication: 1889
- Language: Arabic Tamil
- Headquarters: Colombo

Sarvajana Nesan (Tamil: சர்வஜன நேசன், 'The Universal Friend') was an Arabic Tamil weekly newspaper published from Colombo, Ceylon 1886-1889. Sarvajana Nesan covered general issues on politics, business and education. Sarvajana Nesan was formed by a group of Ceylonese Muslims to oppose M.K. Cittilevvai, and Sarvajana Nesan served as a rival to his Muslim Nesan. A.L.C. Mohideen was the printer and publisher of Sarvajana Nesan.

Sarvajana Nesan was, along with Muslim Nesan, one of the two most prominent Muslim newspapers in the Tamil-speaking world at the time. Sarvajana Nesan covered news from the Middle East, whilst it relied on material printed in Singai Nesan for news from South-East Asia.
