= Thulhiriya =

Thulhiriya තුල්හිරිය
- Village
- Location within Sri Lanka
- Coordinates: 7°16′15.48″N 80°13′13.62″E
- Country: Sri Lanka
- District: Kegalle

Population
  - Total: 2,755
- Time zone: UTC+5:30 (SLST)
- Postal code: 71610
- Area code: 037

Thulhiriya is a village in the Kegalle District, Sabaragamuwa Province, Sri Lanka.

== History ==
In 1968 the government established the state-owned Thulhiriya Textile Mill, it was privatised to Bombay Dyne in 1980 and then Kabool Lanka until 2003. This was the largest textile mill in Sri Lanka. The mill was constructed in an area of 5.7 ha (14 acres) and under one roof. In 2006 MAS Holdings established a fabric park in Thulhiriya, the country's first privately owned apparel intensive free trade zone. The fabric park spans 66.6 ha (165 acres) and provides employment to over 8,200 people. Since it was established a further eight companies have set up factories in the fabric park.

Thulhiriya has well-established road and railway links. The village is located on the A6 (Colombo - Kurunegala) highway and near the Alawwa railway station, which is on the Main Line (Colombo to Badulla).
