= Ultimo (brand) =

Scottish designer lingerie brand

- Company type: Private
- Headquarters: Glasgow, Scotland
- Area served: Worldwide
- Products: Lingerie
- Website: ultimo.co.uk

Ultimo was a Scottish designer lingerie brand, majority owned by Sri Lanka–based lingerie group MAS Holdings. It was founded in 1996 by Michelle Mone, via her company MJM International Ltd., with her then-husband Michael. In 2013, after their marriage collapsed, Ultimo was transferred to joint venture company Ultimo Brands International Ltd, an equal partnership between Michelle Mone and MAS Holdings. In November 2014, Mone sold the majority of her stake to MAS Holdings. In August 2015, Mone resigned from the boards of MJM International Ltd and Ultimo Brands International Ltd.

== History ==
Michelle Mone was born and grew up in the East End of Glasgow, Scotland. After an early career as a model, she ran Labatt's Scottish sales and marketing team. After being made redundant and having her second child, in October 1996 she decided, while wearing a very uncomfortable cleavage enhancing bra at a dinner dance, that she could create a better design. Her stated aims were to create a bra that was both more comfortable, and better looking, creating more cleavage.

With her then-husband Michael, Mone founded MJM International Ltd in November 1996. After three years of research, design and development, the company patented the Ultimo bra. In August 1999, Mone launched Ultimo at Selfridges department store in London. In May 2000, Ultimo was launched in the United States at the Saks Fifth Avenue store in New York.

In September 2003, MJM launched their third design, The Ultimo Miracle Body, a backless and front-less bra. In April 2004, the company launched a new lingerie brand with Asda, branded "Michelle for George", and in September 2006, launched "Adore Moi" for Debenhams. In May 2007, MJM moved beyond lingerie, with the launch of the "Trim Secrets" diet pill.

MJM International signed a deal with Debenhams CEO Rob Templeman to open stand alone Ultimo stores within Debenhams. The first Ultimo shop opened in Glasgow's Debenhams Silverburn in October 2007. As of June 2008, there were twelve Ultimo stores across the UK and Ireland. In addition, MJM International supplied Debenhams, Selfridges, House of Fraser, Next, Grattan, Littlewoods, Figleaves, and ASOS.com, along with a number of independent lingerie stores.

In April 2018, Ultimo announced that it would cease trading within the UK.

== Marketing ==
Ultimo has named numerous celebrities as the face and body of the brand, as well as other underwear ranges that fall under its banner. Among them are models Kelly Brook and Helena Christensen, actresses Gemma Atkinson (Ultimo D-G cup) and Kara Tointon (Michelle for George), singers Mel B, Sarah Harding, and Samantha Mumba (Per Amore), television presenters Jenni Falconer, Peaches Geldof, Melinda Messenger, and Melanie Sykes. The last high-profile Ultimo model was Petra Nemcova.

The first Ultimo girl was Scottish model Mary Kennedy, but the brand went global after Mone claimed Julia Roberts had worn an Ultimo prototype in Erin Brockovich, although the film's costume designer, Jeffrey Kurland, has since denied this.Penny Lancaster, the future wife of singer Rod Stewart, became the first high-profile Ultimo girl. However, she was replaced a year later by Stewart's ex-wife Rachel Hunter. The decision, dubbed "Bra Wars" by the British press, was seen as a publicity stunt which infuriated Stewart who described Mone as a "manipulative cow", yet two of his daughters – Kimberly and Ruby – would later model for Ultimo.

In 2010, Mone promoted her brand by posing in specially designed underwear after losing six stone. Following the success of her Ultimo debut, in 2011 and 2014 she recruited non-models to front a new 'real woman' campaign. In 2014, Mone's daughter Rebecca became the face of Ultimo, modelling the DD-G range.

== See also ==
- Michelle, Baroness Mone
