= Ve Global =

Technology company based in London, England

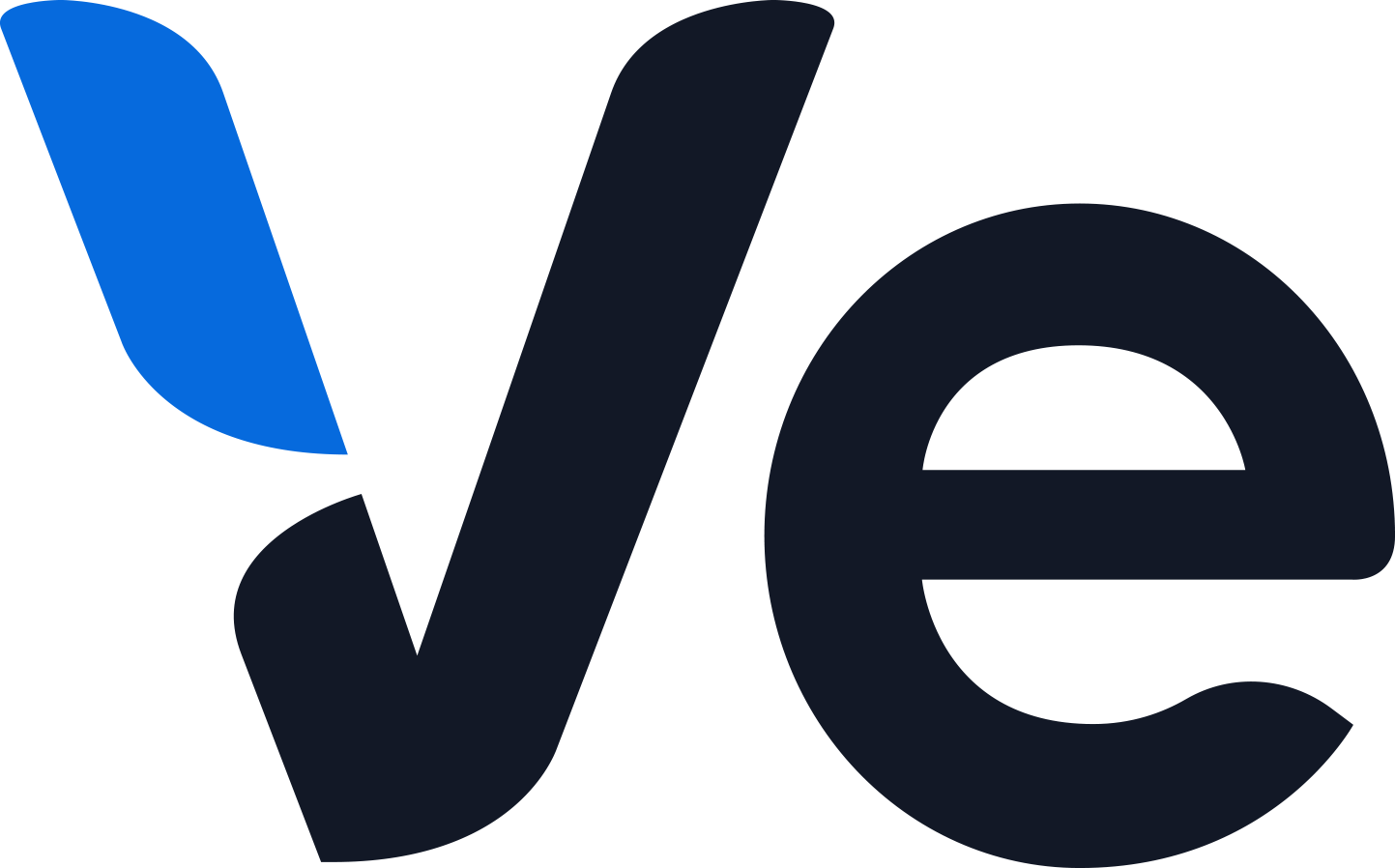
- Type: Private
- Industry: Digital advertising, e-commerce, re-engagement, website optimisation
- Founded: 2009
- Founders: Steve Clucas/David J. Brown
- Headquarters: Old Street, East London,
- Area served: Worldwide
- Key people: David Marrinan-Hayes CEO
- Products: Programmatic advertising, digital assistants, email remarketing
- Number of employees: ~150
- Website: ve.com

Ve Global ("Ve"), formerly Ve Interactive, was a technology company based in London which has about 400+ staff.

Founded in 2009, it was bought out of administration for £2 million in 2017. In September 2017, Ve announced a £15 million investment from existing investors to strengthen its worldwide business.

Ve supplies companies in the e-commerce industry with video, customer prospecting, online customer service and email marketing. Ve's global headquarters are in the White Collar Factory on Silicon Roundabout in Old Street, London.

== History ==
Ve was established in London in October 2009 as a technology start-up. As of 2018 it operated offices in 18 territories globally.

Much of the company's growth has been organic, however the company has also expanded through several acquisitions;

- June 2012: Ve acquired Adaptive Consultancy, making Ve’s platform the world’s first eCommerce software to have both remarketing technology and built-in basket recovery.
- April 2014: Ve acquired adGenie, a prospecting and retargeting advertising solution provider.
- November 2014: Ve acquired GDM Digital, an adtech and digital advertising company, for £7 million. All their staff were transferred over to Ve's team.
- November 2014: Ve acquired Qunb, a Paris-based data visualisation start-up, for $12 million, adding all their staff to Ve's Paris office.
- December 2015: Ve acquired the Display Retargeting business from eBay Enterprise Marketing Solutions.
- September 2016: Ve acquired video advertising company Optomaton for the sum of €5.13m, for cash and shares in Ve.
- December 2016: Ve acquired London-based media agency Crave & Lamb (established in 2012) for the sum of £3m.
- January 2019: Ve acquired a Swedish e-commerce analytics platform Divvit in a deal that involved both cash and Ve’s stock.

In April 2017, Ve Interactive was bought out of administration by a consortium of existing investors for £2m. In September 2017, the company moved from WeWork to a permanent office at the White Collar Factory on Silicon Roundabout in Old Street, London.

Later that month, Ve announced it had secured a £15million investment from existing shareholders which was used to strengthen its worldwide business.

The company relaunched its brand at dmexco, an international exposition and conference for the digital industry in Germany.

In January 2018, Ve announced the appointment of Lady Michelle Mone OBE as a non-exec board member alongside financial trading expert Duncan MacInnes and experienced investor Mark Turner.

A portion of Ve Interactive’s funding comes from a group of Angel Investors. In May 2017 Ve Interactive, previously valued by some investors at £1.5 bn, was bought out of administration for £2 million.

In September 2017, Ve announced it had secured a £15million investment from existing shareholders which will be used to strengthen its worldwide business.

In April 2018, Ve appointed David Marrinan-Hayes as CEO replacing Morten Tonnesen who left after successfully consolidating and strengthening Ve's position.

== Awards ==
Ve was included in Tech City's Future Fifty annual list of top 50 digital startups in 2017. The company has since been awarded a Campaign Creative and European Digiday Award for its work with Nissan and Virgin Media/Athletics Ireland, respectively.

== Clients and Partnerships ==
As of 2018, Ve Global has approximately 4,000 clients including both large and small companies. In late 2017, Ve formed a partnership with igaming giant NetEnt to offer programmatic advertising. Ve also has long-standing strategic alliances with Microsoft and Sabre.

== Funding ==
A portion of Ve Interactive’s funding came from a group of Angel Investors. After Ve was bought out of administration, the company announced it had secured a £15million investment from existing shareholders which will be used to strengthen its worldwide business.
