= S. Z. M. Mashoor Moulana =

Sri Lankan politician

Hon. S. Z. M. Mashoor Moulana
- மசூர் மௌலானா

Kalmunai Municipal Council (mayor)
- In office 2009–2011

Chairman, Karaivakupattu Village Council (1966–1974)

Senator, Senate Council of Ceylon Parliament

Member, Eastern Provincial Council (1988–1991)
- In office 1966–1974

First Secretary, Indian Tamil Nadu High Commission (1991–1993)

Personal details
- Born: 31 January 1932 Maruthamunai, Sri Lanka
- Died: 4 December 2015 (aged 83) Colombo, Sri Lanka
- Party: Illankai Tamil Arasu Kachchi
- Other political affiliations: Sri Lanka Muslim Congress
- Spouse: Bushrathul Naheema
- Domestic partner: S. Z. M. Sakkaf Moulana (brother)
- Children: 7 Mibuhani Moulana(d) Yasmin Moulana Akram Moulana Shiham Moulana Mafahir Moulana Ilham Moulana Noushad Moulana
- Education: Al-Manar Central College Maruthamunai, Shivananda National College, Batticaloa, Zahira College, Colombo, Sri Lanka Law College
- Occupation: Politician
- Profession: English teacher

Alhaj S. Z. M. Mashoor Moulana (மசூர் மௌலானா, 31 January 1932 – 4 December 2015), born in Maruthamunai, Eastern Province, was a Sri Lankan politician.

He began his political career alongside the Illankai Tamil Arasu Kachchi leader, S. J. V. Chelvanayakam, with whom he was very closely associated in all his political activities.

He addressed on the Illankai Tamil Arasu Kachchi platform and contested the 1960 General Election and lost the seat by a narrow margin of 112 votes. In 1966 he became the chairman of the Karaivakupattu Village Council, a position that he remained in until 1974.

Moulana served as senator and the chairman of the Hotels Corporation during President J.R. Jayewardene and Prime Minister R. Premadasa's tenure, and thereafter as a member of the Eastern Provincial Council.

Moulana was also then Mayor of the Kalmunai Municipal Council between 2009 and 2011.
