= A. M. Merza =

Sri Lankan businessperson (1907–1979)

Hon. Abdul Majid Merza
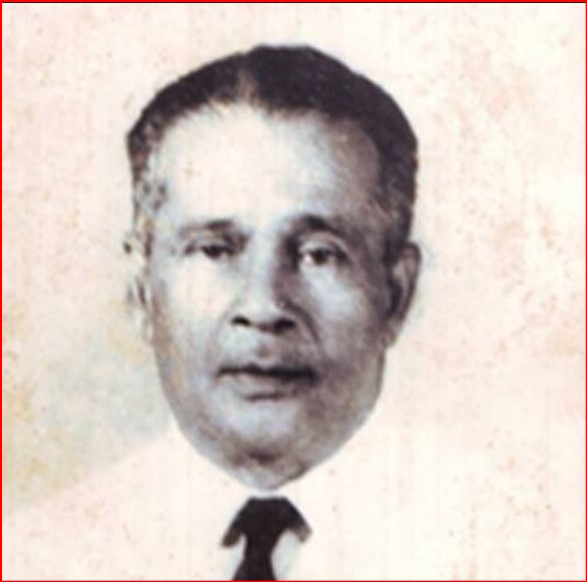

Member of the Ceylonese Parliament for Kalmunai
- In office 1952–1956
- Preceded by: M. S. Kariapper
- Succeeded by: M. S. Kariapper

Personal details
- Born: 17 May 1907 Sammanthurai, British Ceylon
- Died: 30 December 1979 (aged 72) Sainthamaruthu, Sri Lanka
- Party: Independent politician
- Spouse: Fathima Mohammed Hussain
- Children: Inpa Laksana Maryam Jaffer, Ifthikar Rustam Mirza, Imru Shiras Mirza
- Website: http://www.worldgenweb.org/lkawgw/gen203.htm

Abdul Majid Merza was a Sri Lankan Muslim businessman and politician.

Merza ran as an independent at the 2nd parliamentary election, held between 24 May 1952 and 30 May 1952, in the Kalmunai electorate. He won the seat, polling 6,078 votes (43% of the total vote), defeating the sitting United National Party member, M. S. Kariapper by 3,908 votes.

Merza didn't contest his seat at the 1956 parliamentary election and was appointed to the board of the Valaichchenai Paper Corporation, where he subsequently became the corporation's chairman for a number of years.
