= Apparel industry in Sri Lanka =

The apparel industry in Sri Lanka employs about 15% of the country's workforce, accounting for about half of the country's total exports, and Sri Lanka is among the top apparel-producing countries in the world relative to its population.

Textile and clothing industries have been Sri Lanka's largest gross export earner since 1986 and accounted for more than 52% of the total export earnings of the country. It is also the country's largest net foreign exchange earner since 1992.

== Development ==
Sri Lanka's apparel industry began to grow significantly in the 1980s as an alternative to India's garment manufacturers, because of its open economic policy as well as the trade and investment-friendly environment. Under the Multi Fibre Agreement, quota regime Sri Lanka became an attractive new venue for businesses. In 1985, Martin Trust, one of the pioneers in the development of "speed sourcing" for the American fashion retail sector, began working with Sri Lankan textile and apparel companies. In 1986 and 1987 he established joint venture partnerships with The Omar Group (formerly known as LM Apparels and part of the Brandix group) and The Amalean Group which helped make the country more competitive through knowledge transfers and technology, attracting further foreign investors. These were the first of nearly two dozen joint venture companies in Sri Lanka which made the country competitive in the garment sector. Including Trust's partnership with German brassiere maker, Triumph International, and Sri Lankan company, MAS Holdings, to create a new venture called Bodyline.

When the US and other countries eliminated quantitative restrictions on garments produced in China, many garment facilities in Sri Lanka were consolidated. As of 2010, most of the exports to the US are from MAS, Brandix and Hirdaramani Group with smaller amounts coming from Jay Jay Mills Groups. Together, these three companies account for a majority of the value of exports of garments to the US market.

== Economic growth ==
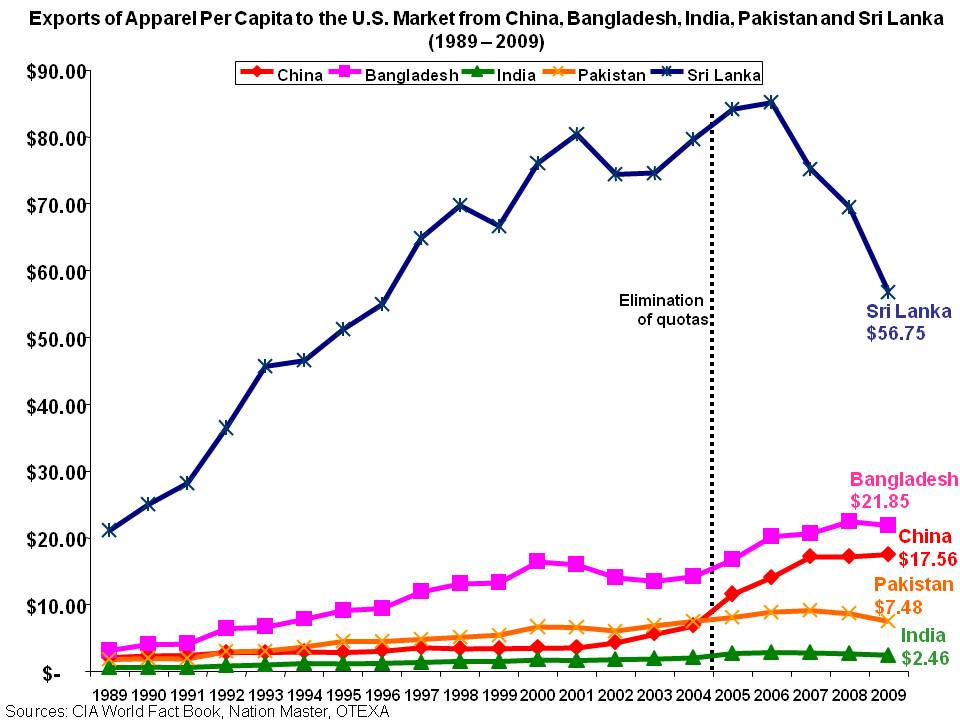
Exports of apparel per capita to the US market from leading garment-manufacturing countries, 1989–2009.

Over the last few decades, the apparel industry grew to represent Sri Lanka's number one export. Following a 38% increase in textile-based revenue from 1996 to 1997, in which the industry generated $2.18 billion in earnings, 50 new textile factories opened in Sri Lanka in 1998. As of 1998, the Sri Lanka apparel industry employed about 300,000 people in 800 factories. Sri Lanka nationals are primary owners of 85% of the small-to-mid-sized factories, while larger operations are typically joint ventures or foreign-owned.

The end of Sri Lanka's civil war in 2009 relieving pressure on the country's garment industry. After fighting ceased, Brandix, a garment manufacturer with 25,000 employees, announced that its factory in Punani would double its exports. Later that year, Sri Lanka held its largest ever Design Festival, highlighting the country's high-fashion merchandise, upcoming designers and advancing the industry's desire to become known as a hub for design, as well as manufacturing. More exhibits followed once the Conference and Exhibition Management Services began operating out of Sri Lanka in 2010. In doing so, the global company announced three international textile exhibits in Sri Lanka, each to highlight a different aspect of the local textile and apparel industry while allaying fears about political instability and showing that Sri Lanka can compete with the EU market.

As of the late 2000s (decade), the Sri Lankan textile industry contributes 39% to the industrial production of the country and represents 43% of the country's total exports. Since the 1970s, the industry has grown to become the country's largest single source of export revenue.

== Trade partnerships ==
The United States is the main importer of textile goods from Sri Lanka, accounting for 76% of total exports from Sri Lanka. As of 2009, Sri Lanka ranked 12th among apparel exporters to the United States in terms of value.

Sri Lanka's partnership was advanced in 2000 in part by setting up logistics centres at key US ports to smooth the importation of Sri Lankan goods. Beginning in 2004, Sri Lankan officials have sought to increase textile deals in North Carolina, the American state with the largest concentration of textile industries.

== Revenue Statistics ==
Year	Total Revenue (in million. US$)
2019	▲$5,577
2020	▼$4,406
2021	▲$5,415
2022	▲$5,933
2023	▼$4,864
2024	▲$5,050
2025	▲$5,300

== Social responsibility ==
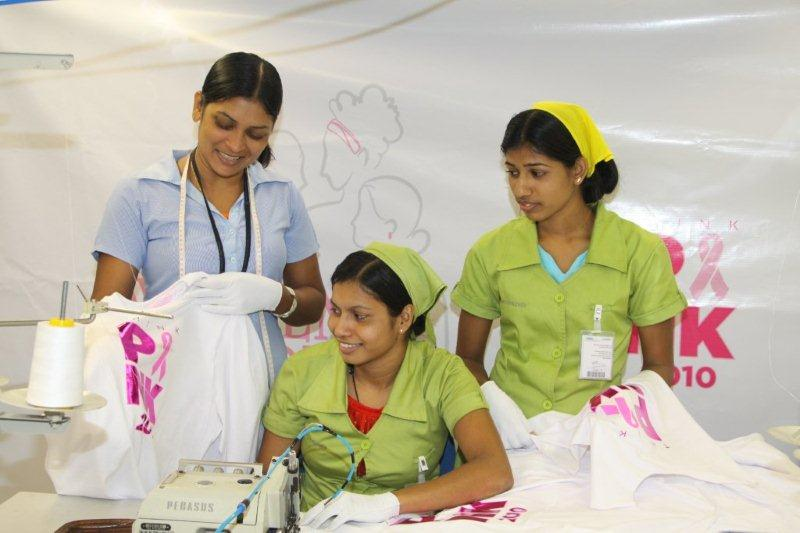
Women working in Sri Lanka apparel industry.

Sri Lanka's apparel industry has invested much in achieving recognition for what the Daily Mirror calls its "conscientious standpoint in apparel production". Through the long-running Garments without Guilt campaign, the industry's trade association, Sri Lanka Apparel has called attention to its adherence to ethical considerations, including its opposition to child labour. Sri Lanka Apparel is a signatory to 39 conventions of the International Labour Organization, the only country with a significant manufacturing industry to do so. Child labour is outlawed in the country, and the minimum statutory age for employment is 18, though some conditional exemptions exist for those over 16. Sri Lankan law also mandates that employers contribute 3% of an employee's salary to a trust fund, which the employee receives after he or she leaves the company.

Among the largest firms in the Sri Lanka apparel industry, employing about 100,000 people, is MAS Holdings, which is a supplier to Gap, Marks and Spencer, Nike and Victoria's Secret, among others. In recent years, MAS has placed a strong emphasis on corporate social responsibility, for which it has been recognised with a CIMA Financial Management Award in 2007.

=== Women in the workforce ===
Women make up a significant share of the industry's workforce. As of 2023, Sri Lanka's apparel industry provided around 350,000 direct jobs.

== See also ==
- Economy of Sri Lanka
- Textile industry
