= MAS Holdings =

Sri Lankan apparel company

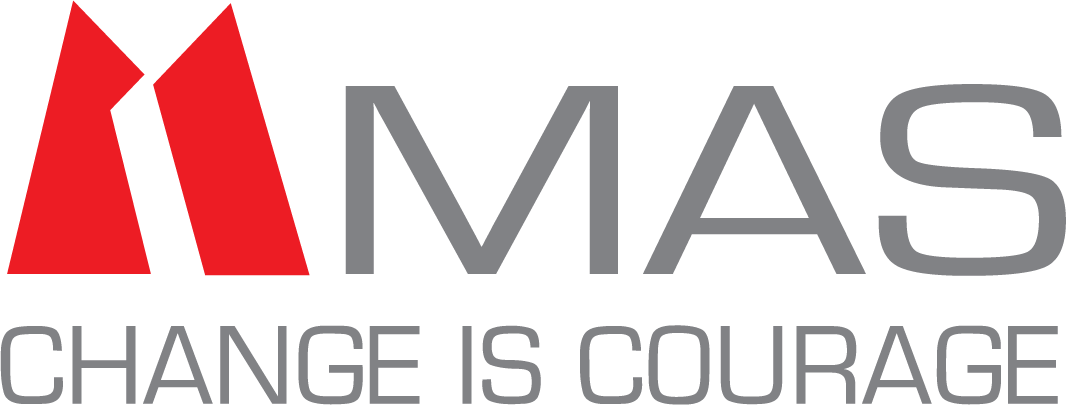
- Native name: ඇම්.ඒ.එස්. හෝල්ඩින්ග්ස්
- Formerly: Sigma Industries (1984 – 1987)
- Type: Private
- Industry: Apparel & Textile
- Founded: 1987; 39 years ago in Panadura, Sri Lanka
- Founders: Mahesh Amalean; Sharad Amalean; Ajay Amalean
- Headquarters: Colombo, Sri Lanka
- Areas served: 16 countries
- Key people: Deshamanya Mahesh Amalean (Chairman); Sharad Amalean (Deputy Chairman); Ajay Amalean (Co-Founder); Suren Fernando (CEO)
- Products: Intimate wear Sports and active wear Performance wear Textiles; IT; Brands; Industrial parks Swimwear amantè, Become (clothing), Spryng
- Revenue: US$ 2 Billion ( 2018 )
- Number of employees: 99,000+ ( 2019 )
- Subsidiaries: MAS Intimates (Pvt) Ltd; MAS Active (Pvt) Ltd; MAS Kreeda (Pvt) Ltd; MAS Brands (Pvt) Ltd attune Consulting rizing Bodyline (Pvt) Ltd
- Website: masholdings.com

MAS Holdings is a Sri Lankan apparel manufacturer. The company was founded in 1987 by Mahesh, Sharad and Ajay Amalean. MAS Holdings began as an underwear manufacturer and later diversified into sportswear, performance wear and swimwear.

MAS Holdings has 53 manufacturing facilities in 17 countries employing over 100,000 people globally (Sri Lanka - 90,040 in 2021/22). The company has design and development hubs in New York, London, Hong Kong and Colombo.

The company manufactures apparel accessories, fabrics, and finished garments. MAS Holdings’ current portfolio encompasses businesses in IT, brands and industrial parks.

== History ==
=== Early ages ===
==== 1980s to 1990s ====
In 1984, they pooled US$10,000, bought 40 sewing machines and founded an apparel company named Sigma Industries.

In 1986, MAS formed its first joint venture with MAST Industries, to manufacture women’s synthetic dresses.

==== 2000s ====
In 2000, MAS launched its first in-house intimate apparel brand, amantèin India.

In 2004, Nike formed a strategic partnership with MAS Holdings.

In 2007 and 2008, MAS holdings opened Fabric Parks in Sri Lanka and India.

In 2008, MAS Holdings unveiled Thurulie, touted as the world’s first carbon neutral, eco-manufacturing apparel plant.

==== 2010-Present ====
MAS opened up facilities in Killinochchi, northern Sri Lanka, to provide employment opportunities.

== Global Operations ==
After 2010, MAS Holdings gradually began expanding globally, opening manufacturing facilities in Bangladesh, Indonesia, Honduras, Jordan, Vietnam and USA.

=== Expansion ===
In 2016, the company announced its investment into manufacturing facilities in Caracol Industrial Park, Haiti. In 2017, the company acquired Acme-McCrary as its first manufacturing and development centre in Asheboro, USA.

== Key Business Units ==
=== Apparel Manufacturing ===
==== Intimate Wear (MAS Intimates and Bodyline) ====
MAS Intimates - includes bras, briefs and corsetry. Through MAS Design and its design and development centres in Asia, America and UK, the company works with its customers from the initial concept development process. In 2011, MAS partnered with Marks and Spencer to create what was promoted as the world’s first carbon neutral lingerie product range for the UK High Street.

==== Dedicated Sportswear (MAS Active and MAS KREEDA) ====
MAS Active - Established in 2005, MAS Active is a provider of sportswear, athleisure and T-shirts, underwear, and boxers. MAS Active manufactures performance wear (sports bras, performance bra tops and pants, yoga wear), sleepwear and "lifestyle wear" (hoodies, T-shirts, pants, jackets). As of September 2017, MAS Active consisted of multiple operation centers, a 'design and innovation studio', 6 factories in Sri Lanka and overseas ventures in Haiti, Italy and USA.

MAS KREEDA derives its name from the Sinhalese word for sports and is MAS Holdings’ exclusive partner for Nike. MAS KREEDA has 14 manufacturing facilities across Jordan, India and Sri Lanka and was launched in 2017.

==== Swimwear (Linea Aqua) ====
MAS Holdings partnered with Speedo International (UK) and Brandot International (USA) in 2001, to form Linea Aqua. Linea Aqua has manufactured competition swimwear for Speedo for the 2004 Athens Olympics and 2006 Melbourne World Championships.

=== Twinery - Innovations by MAS ===
Twinery-Innovations by MAS (formerly known as MAS Innovation) was formally launched in 2013 and is a formal cohesion of the fragmented research and development divisions within the organization. The company develops its own products through in-house teams.

At the wearable technologies show in San Francisco in 2017, MAS unveiled ‘Firefly’, the result of a collaboration with Flex to integrate IoT into clothing. The smart clothing embeds a series of flashing LED lights in an attempt to provide better safety measures for runners, cyclists and construction workers.

MAS Innovation has partnered with international universities such as Massachusetts Institute of Technology and Stanford University as well as Sri Lankan universities to research on areas such as wearable technology, health, wellness, digitization, and customization.

=== MAS Brands ===
amantè, an MAS-owned lingerie brand designed for South Asian women, was launched in India in 2007. amantè was subsequently launched in Sri Lanka in 2012 in Pakistan in 2016 and in Maldives in 2017.

In November 2014, MAS Brands gained controlling stake of Ultimo, a Glasgow headquartered designer lingerie brand.

=== MAS Fabric Parks ===
MAS Holdings has established two fabric parks – one in Thulhiriya, Sri Lanka and another in Chennai, India. MAS Fabric Park, India was a joint venture partnership on a 737-acre area, located close to the Krishanapatnam Seaport and Chennai airport.

The MAS Fabric Park in Thulhiriya was Sri Lanka’s first privately owned apparel intensive free trade zone. The eco-friendly fabric park in Thulhiriya spans 165 acres and provides employment to 8,200 associates.

In 2017, the company announced the launch of a new industrial park in Giriulla, Sri Lanka. The abandoned lace facility, which was shut down for twelve years, was handed over to MAS Holdings to develop and run, by Prime Minister of Sri Lanka, Ranil Wickremesinghe.
