= Brandix =

Sri Lankan apparel manufacturing company

Brandix Apparel Limited
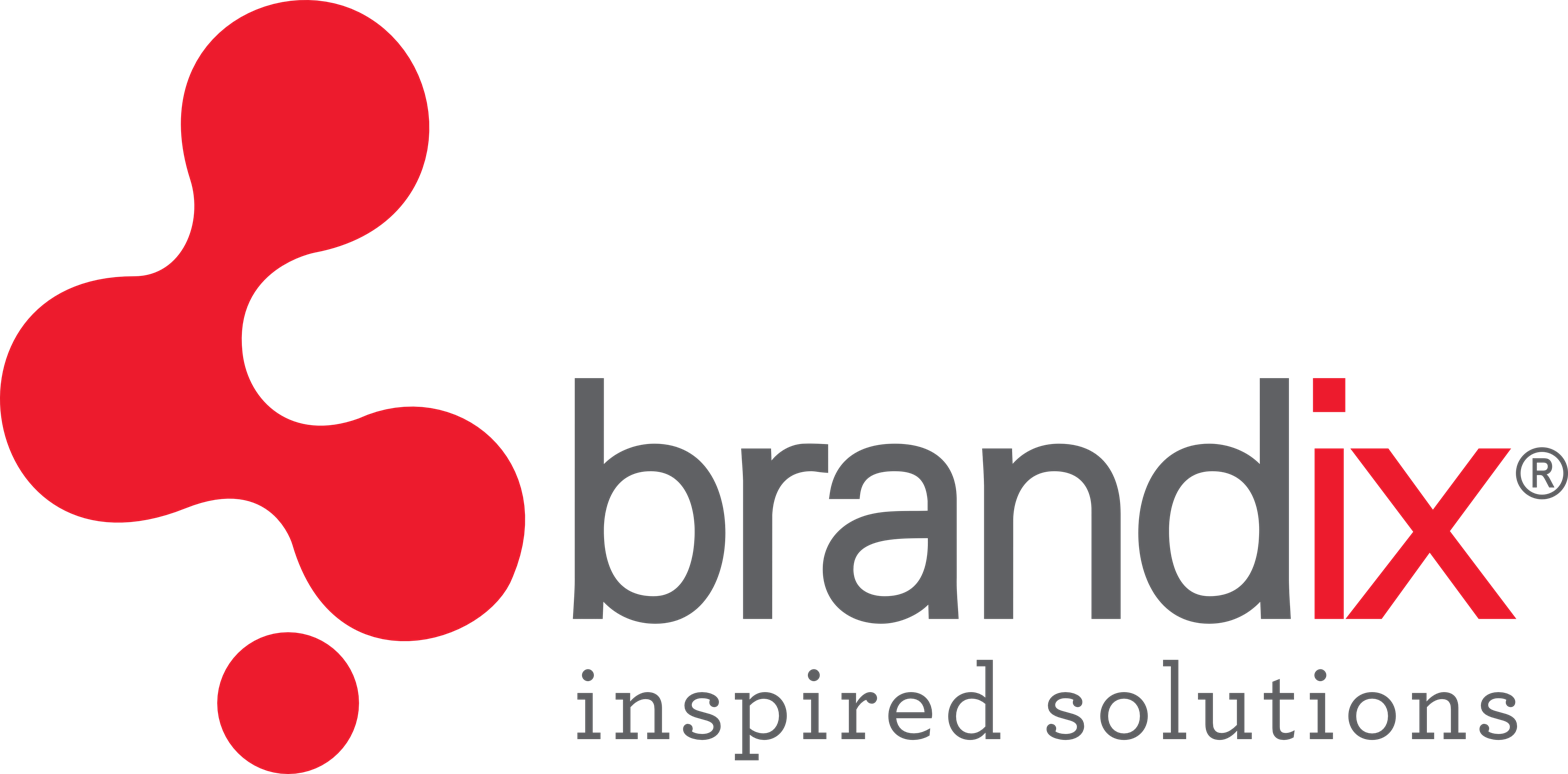
- Native name: බ්‍රැන්ඩික්ස්
- Company type: Private
- Industry: Manufacturing, fashion
- Founded: 1969; 57 years ago in Colombo, Sri Lanka
- Founder: M. H. Omar
- Headquarters: Colombo, Sri Lanka
- Area served: Worldwide
- Key people: Priyan Fernando (Chairman); Ashroff Omar (CEO)
- Products: Casualwear; Intimatewear; Sleep and loungewear Activewear
- Revenue: ▲US$820 million (2020–21)
- Number of employees: 60,000+
- Subsidiaries: Moose Clothing Company, Fortude
- Website: brandix.com

Brandix Apparel Limited is an apparel manufacturer headquartered in Sri Lanka. The company has branches in the United States of America, United Kingdom, Australia, Singapore, Hong Kong, India, Bangladesh, Cambodia, Mauritius, and the Cayman Islands. It is the single largest employer in Sri Lanka's export sector and the highest foreign exchange earning company.

== History ==
Brandix was founded in Sri Lanka in 1969 with the assistance of Martin Trust, an American who is regarded as the father of the modern apparel industry in Sri Lanka. The company began operations in 1972 as a conglomerate which was formally a part of Omar Group.

The business was incorporated as a private limited company in 2002 under the Companies Act No 7 of 2007 as Brandix Pvt Ltd. In 2008, the firm opened a branch in Seeduwa and the branch of the Brandix firm secured the world's first LEED (Leadership in Energy and Environmental Design) platinum certification. The company is headquartered in Colombo and has domestic branches in Seeduwa, Mirigama, Batticaloa and Pannala

Brandix became the first apparel firm in the world to obtain the ISO ISO 50001 standard system certification scheme in 2011.

In June 2019, the Batticaloa branch became the first factory in the world to achieve Net Zero Carbon status.

Brandix Lanka Group received the Exporter of the Year Award at the 2018/19 National Export Awards from the Export Development Board. Ashroff Omar is the company's CEO.

== Moose Clothing Company ==
Moose Clothing Company, which was established in 2018, is a subsidiary of Brandix Lanka Limited. Moose Clothing became a co-sponsor of South African cricket tour of Sri Lanka in 2018. In 2023, the company entered into the Singaporean market when it signed an agreement with Mustafa Centre.

== Fortude ==
Established in 2012 as Brandix i3, Fortude was rebranded in 2017. The company operates as a subsidiary of Brandix Lanka Limited, providing enterprise technology software and consulting.
