= Pelwatte Sugar Industries =

Sugar manufacturer in Sri Lanka

Pelwatte Sugar Industries PLC
- Type: Public
- Traded as: CSE: SUGA.N0000
- Industry: Sugar
- Founded: 1981; 45 years ago
- Headquarters: Buttala, Sri Lanka
- Key people: D. H. S. Jayawardena (Chairman)
- Products: Sugar; Dairy; Alcohol
- Revenue: ▲ Rs 42 billion (2019)
- Net income: ▼ Rs 926 million (2019)
- Total assets: ▲ Rs 105.560 billion (2019)
- Total equity: ▲ Rs 4.248 billion (2019)
- Number of employees: 5,100 (2019)
- Parent: Melstacorp
- Divisions: Pelwatte Sugar Distilleries (Pvt) Limited
- Subsidiaries: Pelwatte Agriculture & Engineering Services; Pelwatte Dairy
- Website: www.pelwattesugar.com

Pelwatte Sugar Industries PLC is a Sri Lankan sugar manufacturing company, which is listed on the Colombo Stock Exchange. The main sugar factory of the group is located in Buttala in the Moneragala District, Uva Province, about 225 kilometres (140 mi) from Colombo to the east of the country. Pelwatte Sugar was incorporated on 19 February 1981 as Pelwatte Sugar Company Ltd. It became a Public Limited Liability company on 10 December 1982. In 1990, the holding company changed its name to Pelwatte Sugar Industries Ltd. It was first quoted on the Colombo Stock Exchange in 1984.

== History ==
In 1978 a World Bank funded study was undertaken to identify areas in Sri Lanka that are suitable for sugar cane cultivation to reduce the country's dependency of imported sugar. Based on the findings Booker Tate PLC of United Kingdom (formerly known as Booker Agriculture International Ltd) carried out a feasibility study into the introduction of cane cultivation under rain fed conditions and the establishment of a sugar factory at Pelwatte in the Moneragala District, of the Uva Province in Sri Lanka. In 1981 Pelwatte Sugar Company Ltd was incorporated as a state owned company and functioned under the management of Booker Tate PLC.

In 1997 the company established a subsidiary, Pelwatte Sugar Distilleries (Pvt) Ltd, which began operations in September, processing ethanol and bio-compost from molasses a by-products of the company's sugar manufacturing process.

In 2002 the Government of Sri Lanka sold its stake in the company on the Colombo Stock Exchange. A Sri Lankan company, Master Divers (Private) Limited, purchased 53.5% of the Company for Rs. 300 million.

In 2006 the company launched a new subsidiary, Pelwatte Dairy Industries (Pvt) Limited, investing Rs. 1.8 billion on a dairy processing plant and animal feed production factory in the Monaragala District.

In March 2011 Master Divers sold approximately 47% of the issued capital of the company to Melstacorp, which is a subsidiary of Distilleries Company of Sri Lanka PLC. Master Divers (Private) Limited and related parties holding approximately 36% of the capital.

In November 2011 the government expropriated full ownership of Pelwatte Sugar and Sevanagala Sugar Industries Co Ltd, and its subsidiaries, under the controversial legislation, ‘The revival of Underperforming Enterprises and Underutilized Assets Act’. In March 2013 the Commercial High Court of Western Province issued a winding-up order for the company.

The Distilleries Company of Sri Lanka still maintain that they are the legal owners of the company but they have also lodged an official claim with the Compensation Tribunal for their losses.

== Operations ==
Pelwatte Sugar (PSIL) produces approximately 450,000 metric tons (440,000 long tons; 500,000 short tons) of Sugar. Pelwatte Sugar Distilleries (Private) Ltd, a subsidiary company, began operations in September 1997 to process ethyl alcohol and biocompost from molasses a by-product of the sugar manufacturing process. The group employs about 1,300 permanent workers, about 3100 casual and seasonal workers. The Company operates a sugar factory that has a crushing capacity of 3,000 metric tons (3,000 long tons; 3,300 short tons) of sugar cane. It has the lease ownership of a nucleus estate of approximately 2,000 hectares (4,900 acres), settler area of 3,000 hectares (7,400 acres) and large number of growers in the Uva province.

== See also ==
- Sugar production in Sri Lanka
