= Distilleries Company of Sri Lanka =

Sri Lankan alcoholic beverage company

Distilleries Company of Sri Lanka PLC
- Company type: Public
- Traded as: CSE: DIST.N0000
- ISIN: LK0191N00003
- Industry: Beverages
- Founded: 1913; 113 years ago
- Headquarters: Colombo, Sri Lanka
- Key people: Hasitha Jayawardena (Chairman); Jagath Kahanda (Managing Director)
- Revenue: ▲LKR107.057 billion (2022)
- Operating income: ▲LKR13.061 billion (2022)
- Net income: ▲LKR7.985 billion (2022)
- Total assets: ▲LKR25.160 billion (2022)
- Total equity: ▼LKR6.373 billion (2022)
- Number of employees: 945 (2022)
- Parent: Melstacorp (92.44%)
- Subsidiaries: DCSL Breweries Lanka
- Website: dcslgroup.com

Distilleries Company of Sri Lanka PLC (DCSL) is a diversified Sri Lankan conglomerate listed on the Colombo Stock Exchange with a market capitalisation of US$600 Million. It was one of the first Sri Lankan companies included in Forbes's list of non-US Best Managed companies valued under US$1 billion. The company has also been featured in the business magazine Business Today as one of its Top 10 listed companies in Sri Lanka.

== History ==
=== Under State ownership (1913–1992) ===
It was established in 1913 as the liquor producing division of the Excise Department of Ceylon. In 1974, the State Distilleries Corporation was established to take over the liquor distilling and producing activities of the Excise Department of Ceylon. On 17 November 1989, State Distilleries Corporation was converted into a company with shares. Thus, Distilleries Company of Sri Lanka Limited was born, under the Conversion of Public Corporations Act No: 23 of 1983. On 20 February 1992, 60% of the company was sold on the Colombo Stock Exchange to the highest bidder, a consortium of investors formed by Milford Exports Ceylon Limited, Lanka Milk Foods (CWE) Limited (both companies controlled by Sri Lankan businessman Harry Jayawardena) together with Smith New Court Investors from Singapore.

=== Privatisation (1992) ===
Distilleries Company of Sri Lanka PLC has been called "a landmark success in privatization". A state-owned company producing liquor, it was privatized by the state in 1992. After less than two decades of privatization, DCSL has become a conglomerate with diversified interests in many areas of the country's economy.

=== Conglomerate in the making (1995–2016) ===
In 1995, the company entered into a joint venture with Pernod Ricard of France, one of the top 5 liquor producers in the world, to incorporate Periceyl Limited to produce whiskeys, brandies, and other international liquor in Sri Lanka for the Sri Lankan market. The company represents world-renowned brands such as Chivas Regal and Jameson Irish Whiskey in Sri Lanka. In 1995, the company subsequently acquired the century-old Beruwala Distillery Limited.

In 1996, the company signalled its intention of diversifying into non liquor sectors and acquired tea and rubber plantations by purchasing significant stakes in Madulsima Plantations PLC and Balangoda Plantations PLC under the government's privatization program. In 1999 the company acquired a significant stake in highly diversified Aitken Spence PLC, which has interests in power generation, shipping and hotels in Sri Lanka, India, Oman and the Maldives. In 2003 the company acquired a 90% stake in Sri Lanka Insurance Corporation Limited when the Sri Lankan government sold the state-owned insurer. Sri Lanka Insurance Corporation is a composite insurer with life and non-life insurance portfolios and over US$500 million in assets and assets under management. In June 2009, the Supreme Court of Sri Lanka determined that the privatization of Sri Lanka Insurance was flawed, annulled the privatization and ordered that its current owners return its shares in the company back to the treasury. However, its owners have been allowed to keep profits made by the insurer after privatization.

In 2005, the company acquired a 99% stake in Lanka Bell Limited, a fixed-line telecom operator in Sri Lanka.

DCSL used to be the holding company of Lanka Bell Limited, Periceyl Private Limited, Pelwatte Sugar Industries PLC, Balangoda Plantations PLC, Madulsima Plantations PLC, Texpro Industries Limited and then associate company Aitken Spence PLC.

=== Share Swap and forming a group holding Company (2017–present) ===
In 2016 through a share swap Melstacorp PLC became the holding company of the group making DCSL a subsidiary of the former. All Companies which DCSL owned prior to the swap were transferred to Melstacorp Limited making DCSL a stand-alone liquor company. The current chairman of the Distilleries Company of Sri Lanka PLC is Harry Jayawardena.
