= Lanka Milk Foods =

Sri Lankan dairy products company

Lanka Milk Foods (CWE) PLC
- Lanka Milk Foods logo

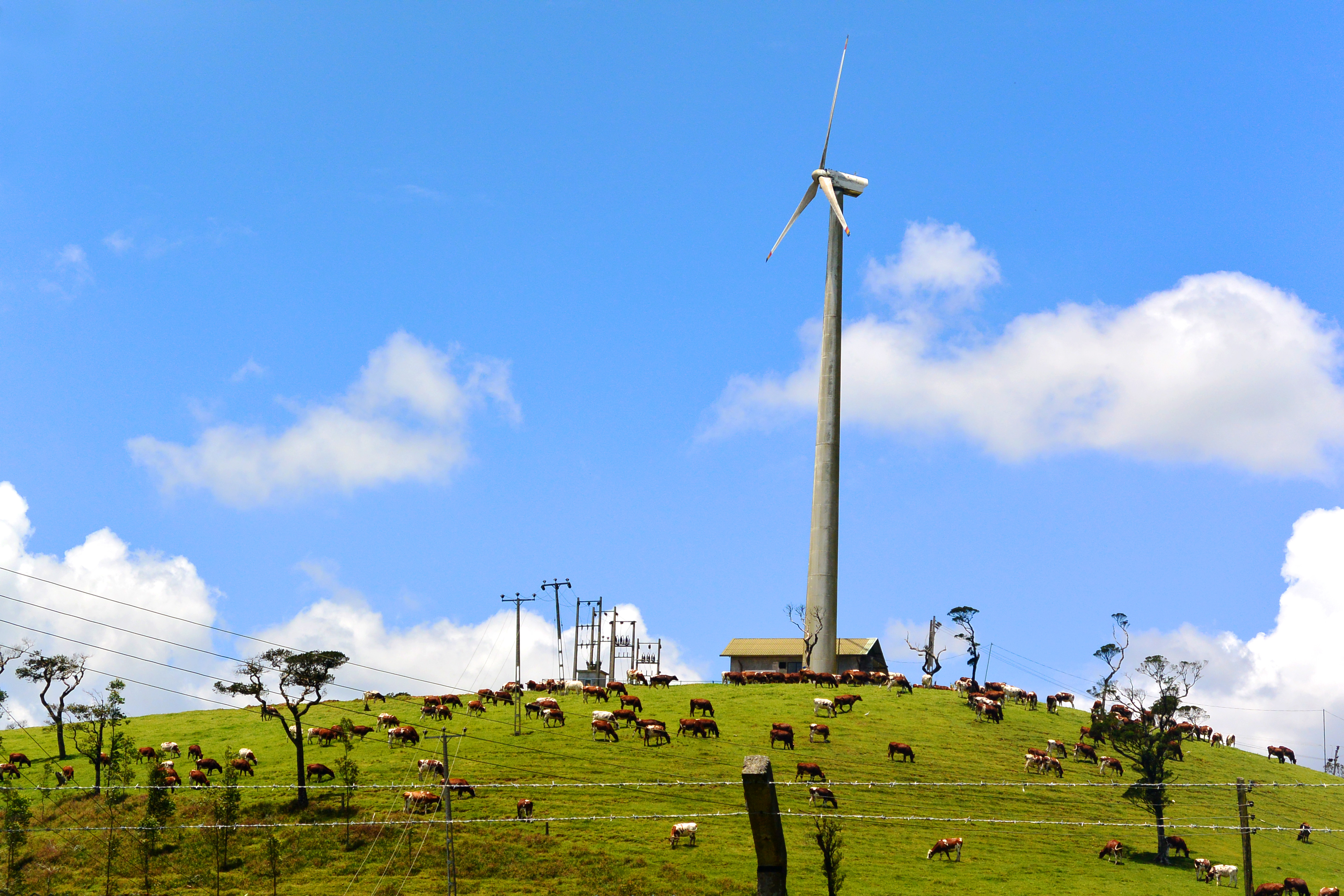
- Ambewela Farm is a subsidiary of Lanka Milk Foods
- Company type: Public
- Traded as: CSE: LMF.N0000
- ISIN: LK0112N00009
- Industry: Food
- Founded: November 12, 1981; 44 years ago
- Headquarters: Ragama, Sri Lanka
- Key people: Royle Jansz (Chairman); Sasanka Perera (Group CEO)
- Brands: Lakspray; Ambewela; Daily; Daily Activ; My Juicee; BLU
- Revenue: ▲LKR9.772 billion (2022)
- Operating income: ▲LKR1.588 billion (2022)
- Net income: ▲LKR1.065 billion (2022)
- Total assets: ▲LKR16.734 billion (2022)
- Total equity: ▲LKR11.433 billion (2022)
- Owners: Milford Exports (33.57%); Melstacorp (32.09%)
- Number of employees: 741 (2022)
- Subsidiaries: See text
- Website: www.lmfgroup.lk

Lanka Milk Foods (CWE) PLC is a dairy products manufacturing company in Sri Lanka. Lanka Milk Foods was a subsidiary of the Co-operative Wholesale Establishment (CWE) which later converted to a joint-stock company. The company was incorporated in 1981 and listed on the Colombo Stock Exchange in 1983 with Sri Lankan Government holding the majority of the shares. The Stassen Group acquired a controlling stake of 51% in the company in 1991. Lanka Milk Foods's subsidiary, Lanka Dairies, introduced flavoured ready-to-drink milk to the market in 1996. Ambewela Farm and New Zealand farm were acquired by Lanka Milk Foods in 2001. In 2020, the company planned to invest LKR3 billion in a new dairy farm in Ambewela to expand production. Lanka Milk Foods is one of the LMD 100 companies in Sri Lanka. Lakspray, a Lanka Milk Foods brand listed among the 100 most valuable brands in Sri Lanka in 2020. Lanka Milk Foods stand to benefit from consumers switching from milk powder to fresh milk.

== History ==
Lanka Milk Foods was a subsidiary of the Co-operative Wholesale Establishment which converted to a joint-stock company. Lanka Milk Foods was established to replace the burnt-down CWE milk powder packing plant. The company was incorporated in 1981 and was listed on the Colombo Stock Exchange in 1983, with the majority of shares held by the Government of Sri Lanka. In 1991, the Stassen Group acquired a controlling stake of 51% in the company. Lanka Dairies, a subsidiary of Lanka Milk Foods, commenced operations in 1996. Lanka Dairies introduced flavoured fresh milk to the market. The company acquired Ambewela Farm and New Zealand Farm in 2001. Ambewela Farm has only purebred Ayrshire cattle. The original cattle stock was brought in from Australia in 1941. Pattipola farm received 700 Jersey heifers from New Zealand in 1966. The farm was renamed New Zealand Farm thereafter. Ambewela Products (Pvt) Ltd, a subsidiary of Lanka Milk Foods, invested LKR one billion to build a new dairy plant in 2008. The plant was set up to produce milk packs, cheese and yoghurt. The reduction of dependency on imported milk powder to save foreign exchange reserves was cited as a corporate social responsibility. Since taking over Ambewela Farm and New Zealand Farm, the company has increased the milk per cow yield by 50%.

Lanka Milk Foods invested LKR800 million to expand the capacity of Lanka Dairies in 2013. The company celebrated the 20th anniversary of its Daily product range in 2016 in a function held in Heritance Negombo. At the time of its launch, only 10% of households had refrigerators. Retailers with refrigeration concentrated around Colombo. Due to these challenges, the company had to invest in a UHT plant. The Tetra pack of Daily had six layers with a shelf life of six months. In 2020, Lanka Milk Foods planned to commission a new dairy farm at a cost of LKR3 billion. The plant was planned to be operated under a new subsidiary, United Dairies Lanka (Pvt) Ltd. The farm planned to accommodate 2,000 cows and double the yoghurt production capacity. In 2020, 40% of the demand for milk in Sri Lanka was fulfilled by fresh milk. The rest of the demand was supplied by importing milk powder at a cost of US$293.5 million per annum. The company hoped to capture the market share of consumers who are switching from milk powder to fresh milk.

== Operations ==
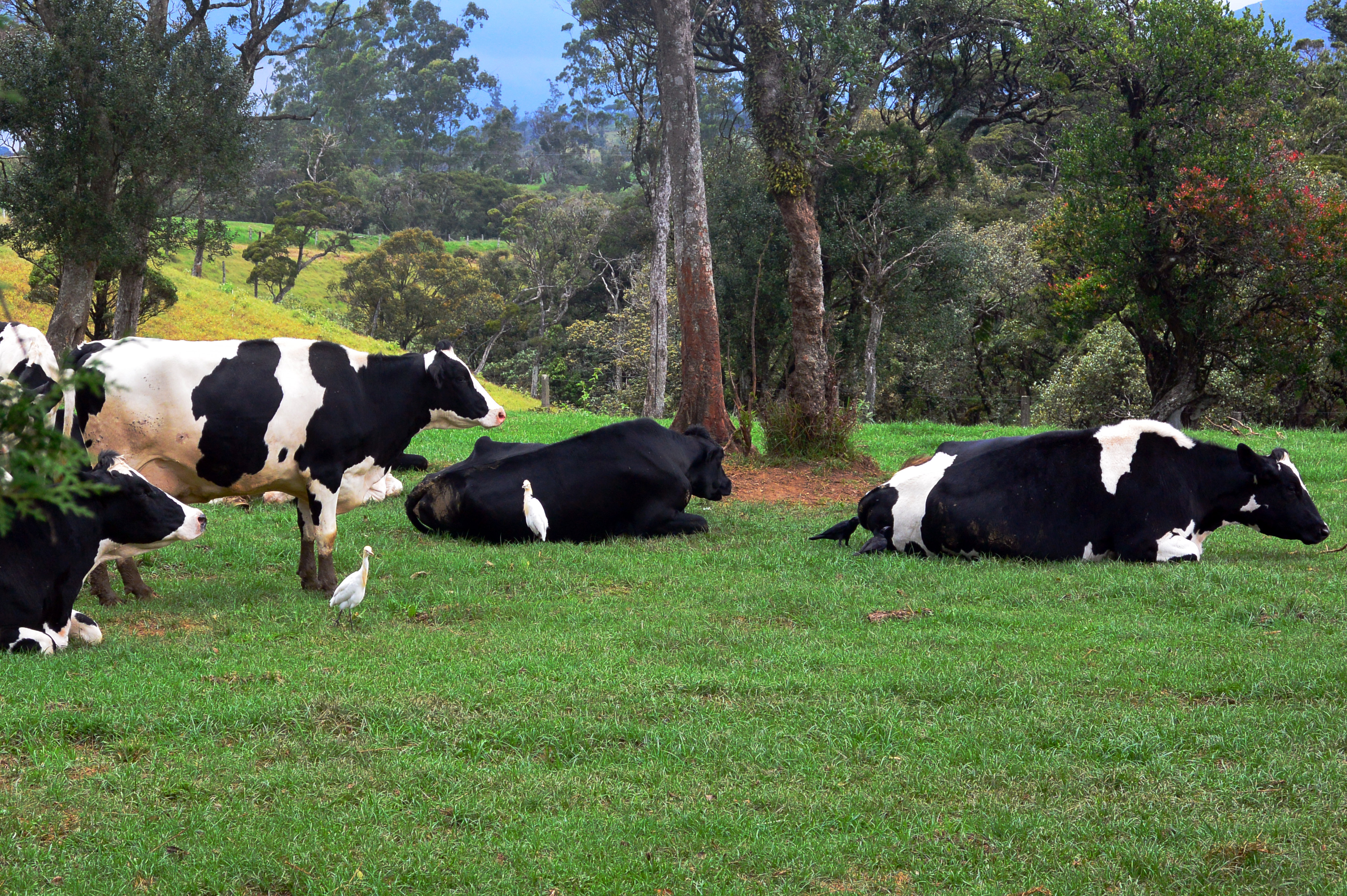
New Zealand Farm in Ambewela is the second farm owned by the company

Lanka Milk Foods was ranked 84th on the LMD 100 list in 2023. LMD 100 lists quoted companies in Sri Lanka by revenue annually. The company slipped by five positions from the 2022 rankings. Lanka Milk Foods' brand Lakspray ranked on Brand Finance's 100 most valuable Sri Lankan brands list in 2020. In 2020, Lakspray was ranked 97th with a brand valuation of LKR357 million.

The shortage of milk powder and the shift from milk powder to fresh milk would be beneficial to Lanka Milk Foods, according to stock brokers Nation Lanka Equities. Due to government-imposed price controls, milk powder importers have limited their imports to the country. The Pearl Protectors, a marine conservation group, issued Marine Pollution Brand Audit revealing Lanka Milk Food is among the top eighteen brands contributing to ocean pollution. In 2022, 2% of marine waste washed up ashore came from Lanka Milk Foods packaging, according to the audit. President Ranil Wickremesinghe toured the Ambewela farm on the eve of 2023. President requested 30 acres (12 ha) of unused land to be given to Lanka Milk Foods to grow fodder. Currently, Ambewela farm produces 40,000 litres per day compared to 1,500-litre daily production under state ownership.

== Finances ==
Ten-year financial summary
Year	Revenue LKR mns	Profit LKR mns	Assets LKR mns	Equity LKR mns	Earnings per share LKR
2022	9,772	1,065	16,734	11,433	26.63
2021	7,597	842	14,501	11,266	21.05
2020	6,704	291	12,954	10,413	7.53
2019	5,386	(127)	10,617	8,857	(3.16)
2018	5,417	581	13,793	12,470	14.52
2017	5,250	542	12,959	11,812	13.56
2016	5,049	121	11,656	10,159	3.17
2015	3,952	(2)	13,307	11,394	0.07
2014	4,572	48	11,587	9,993	1.53
2013	5,437	367	10,572	8,625	9.37

Source: Annual Report (2022, p. 141)

=== Subsidiaries ===
Subsidiary	Holding	Cost LKR (mns)	Activity
Ambewela Livestock Company Ltd (Ambewela Farm)	100%	51	Rearing cattle
Ambewela Products (Pvt) Ltd	100%	1,010	Manufacturing and selling dairy products
Indo Lanka Exports (Pvt) Ltd	51%	30.6	Manufacturing and exporting fruit juices. Dormant.
Lanka Dairies (Pvt) Ltd	100%	5	Producing and packaging fresh milk, flavoured milk and fruit juices
Pattipola Livestock Company Ltd (New Zealand Farm)	100%	46	Rearing cattle
United Dairies Lanka (Private) Limited	100%	50	Dairy farming

Source: Annual Report (2022, p. 87, 105)

== See also ==
- List of companies listed on the Colombo Stock Exchange
