= Muditha Katuwawala =

- Occupation: Economist
- Organization: The Pearl Protectors
- Known for: Marine Conservation
- Notable work: Founding The Pearl Protectors
- Honours: Recognised as May Sea Hero by Scuba Diving Magazine

Muditha Katuwawala (Sinhala: මුදිත කටුවාවල) is a Sri Lankan conservationist and economist. He is the founder of The Pearl Protectors.

== Early life and education ==
Katuwawala attended the Royal College of Colombo. He later studied economics at the University of Texas at Arlington.

== Career ==
In 2018, Katuwawala set up The Pearl Protectors to create awareness about plastic pollution in Sri Lanka. Initially a social media-driven platform, The Pearl Protectors has grown into a conservation organisation with over 2,000 volunteers.

The organisation runs various projects aimed at protecting marine ecosystems, including the Nurdle Free Lanka campaign, which was launched in response to the 2021 MV X-Press Pearl disaster; Turtle Patrol to deter poachers from illegally taking sea turtle eggs; Cleaner Seabeds of Sri Lanka to remove ghost nets from coral reefs.

== Advocacy ==
Katuwawala has been vocal about the need for better management of marine resources and policies that protect Sri Lanka's marine environments. His work includes educating the public on the negative impact of single-use plastics, mobilizing volunteers for marine conservation projects, and advocating for stronger policies and laws to protect Sri Lanka's marine environment.

== Awards and recognition ==
Katuwawala was named May Sea Hero by Scuba Diving magazine in recognition of his work, his leadership in the aftermath of the MV X-Press Pearl disaster, and his ongoing efforts in marine conservation.
