= Ambewela =

Ambewela அம்பேவளை අඹේවෙල
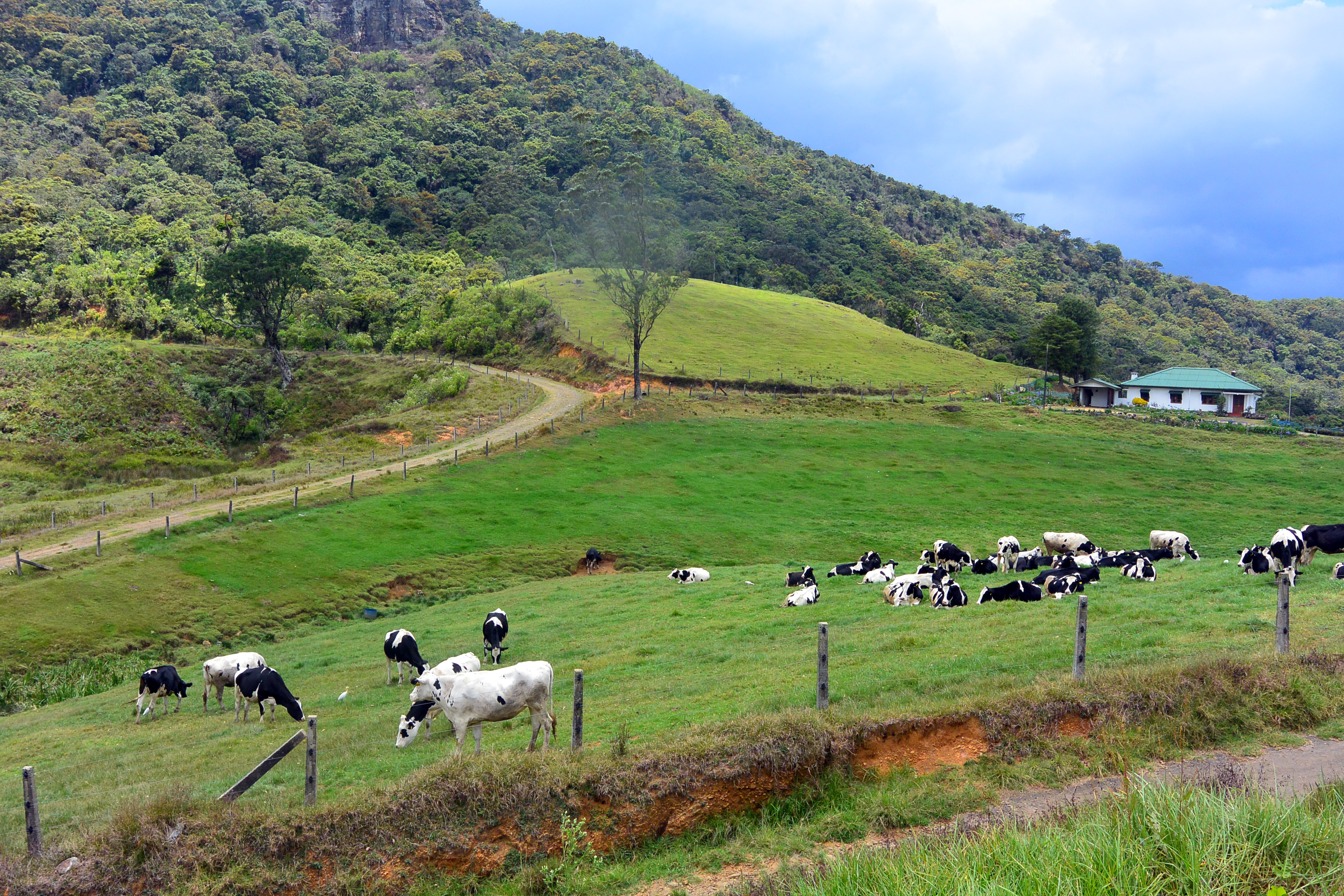
- Hills and grasslands at Ambewela.

- Location within Sri Lanka
- Coordinates: 06°53′53″N 80°48′08″E
- Country: Sri Lanka
- Province: Central Province
- District: Nuwara_Eliya
- Time zone: UTC+5:30 (Sri Lanka Standard Time Zone)

Ambewela (Sinhala: අඹේවෙල, romanized: Am̆bēvela; Tamil: அம்பேவளை, romanized: Ampēvaḷai) is a village, and a hill station, located in the Nuwara Eliya District of Sri Lanka. The area is also sometimes called "Little New Zealand". The town is approximately 17 km (11 mi) south-east of the district capital Nuwara Eliya. Ambewela is also a service centre for the New Galway tea planting district.

== Climate and vegetation ==
Due to the high altitude of 6,064 ft (1,848 m), the mean annual temperature in the area is below 17.5 °C (63.5 °F), while frost is common during winter. Ambewela is popular for being the highest (in altitude) and widest grassland in Sri Lanka. Mammals such as the Sambar Deer and Leopard dominate the majority of the forest cover around the area.

Ambewela is situated en route to the Horton Plains National Park and is famous for scenic landscapes, Rhododendron arboreum flowers, and the World's End, which is a 1,219 m (3,999 ft) deep cliff. Similar to Horton Plains and Ohiya, this site is also one of the Important Bird Areas of Sri Lanka, making the area a popular location for birdwatching as well.

== Importance and economic activities ==
The climatic and economic conditions in Ambewela make it an ideal location for dairy farming, hence the country's only milk powder factory is situated in this area. The two animal husbandries, Ambewela Farm and New Zealand Farm, have Ayrshire cattle and Friesian cows respectively.

=== Potential for wind energy developments ===
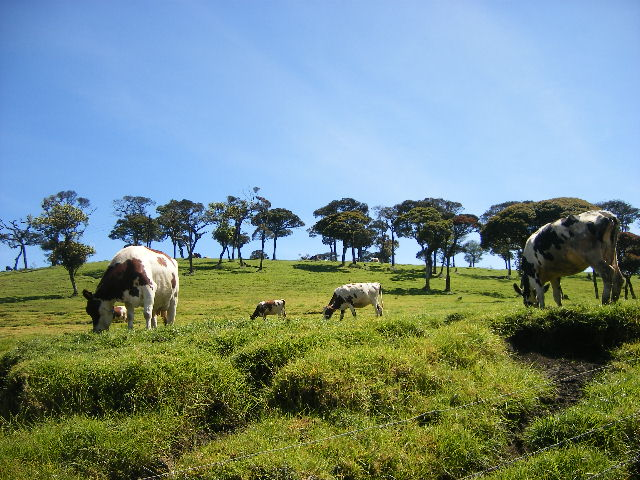
Cattle at Ambewela Farm.

The geographic location and altitude of Ambewela expose the site to strong Southwest Monsoons, with winds occasionally reaching over 12 m/s (39 ft/s), making the area a favourable location for wind farms and other wind energy developments. As the site is only used for livestock development and similar activities, the site is also an economical zone for erecting turbines, since cattle usually are not affected by wind turbines. These factors have attracted many local and international developers.

In 2003, the area was studied in a collaborative project between the Ceylon Electricity Board and NREL. The study revealed that the wind resource at the site is favourable only during the Southwest Monsoon, which is only a small period per year, and that the Northeast Monsoons does not reach the area due to its extreme altitude.

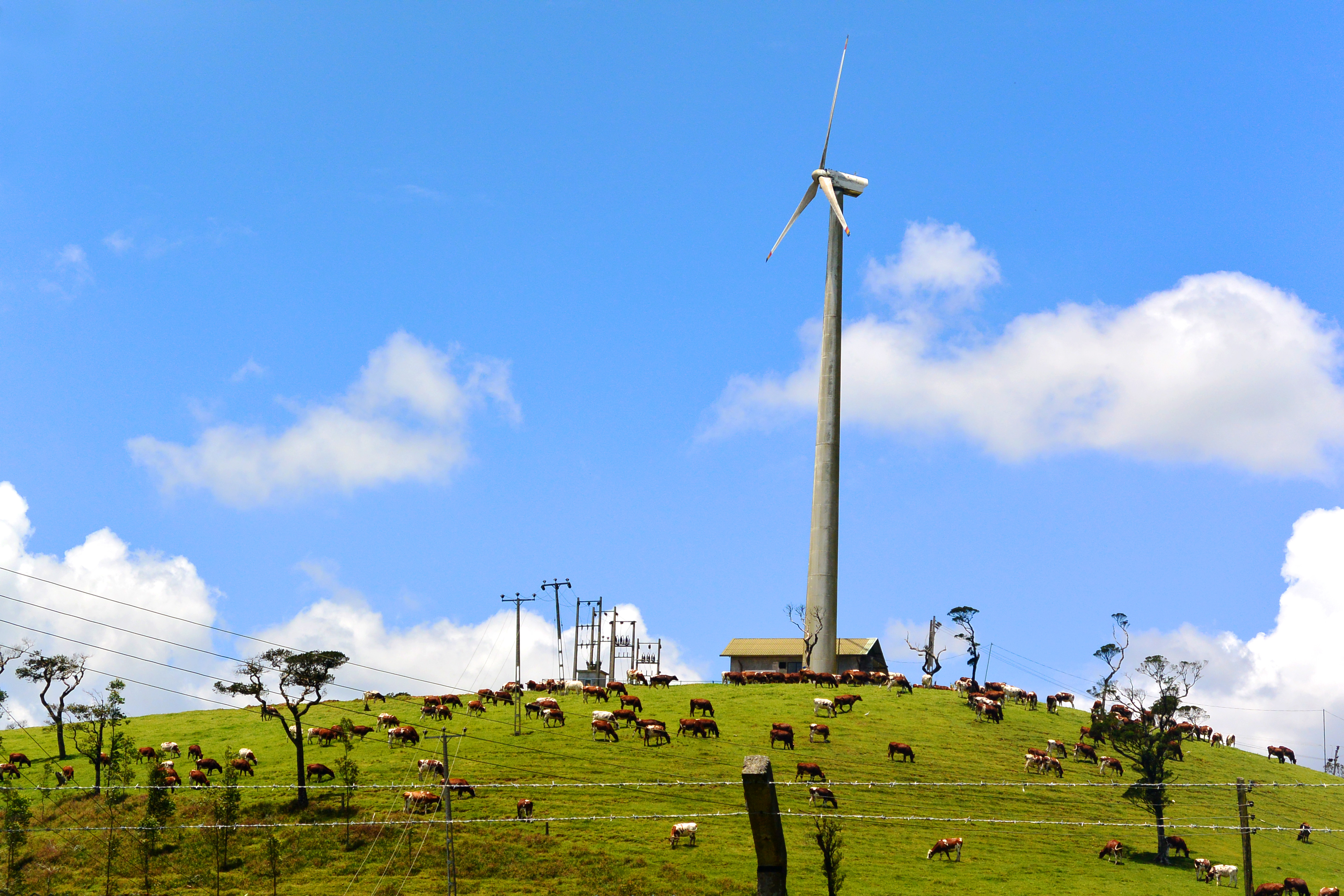
Ambewela Aitken Spence Wind Farm

Transportation of equipment such as wind turbines is also a very significant challenge due to the extreme logistical conditions to access the site. The study revealed that transporting turbines larger than 600KW to the site would be a near-impossible task. The study also revealed that ignoring this issue and constructing wind farms with turbines smaller than 600KW would be extremely uneconomical to the developer.

== Transport ==
- Located on the intersection of the B512 (Nuwara Eliya to Horton Plains Road) and the B507 (Ambewela to Rendapola Road)
- Ambewela railway station - is the second highest railway station in Sri Lanka, at 1,827.77 m (5,996.6 ft) above sea level. It is located on the Main Line between the Nanu Oya and Perakumpura railway stations, in the Nuwara Eliya District, Central Province.
- Main Road

== See also ==
- Ambewela Aitken Spence Wind Farm
