= Ambewela Aitken Spence Wind Farm =

Wind farm in Ambewela, Sri Lanka

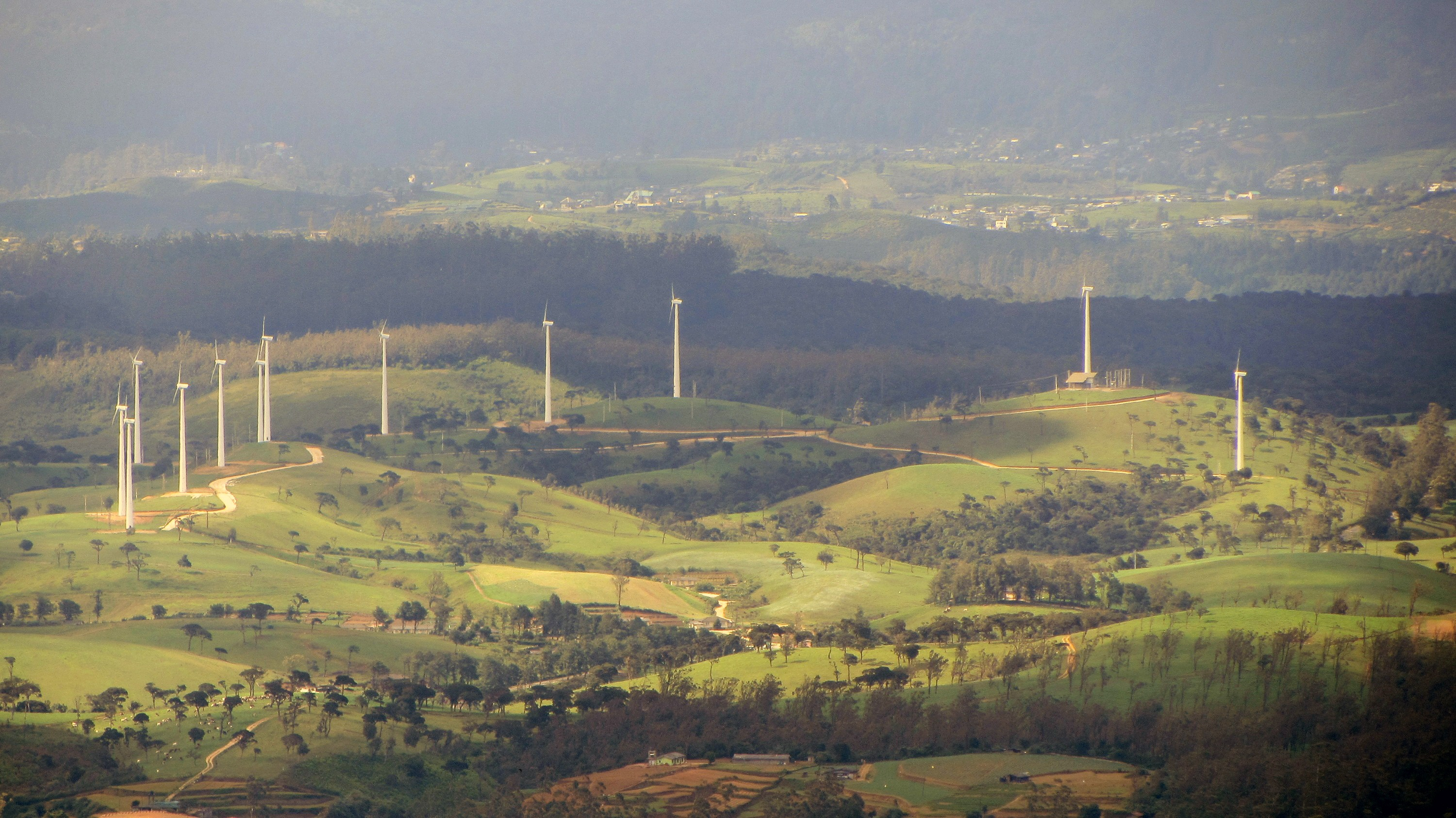
- The twelve turbines of the wind farm.
- Country: Sri Lanka
- Location: Ambewela
- Coordinates: 6°50′36″N 80°48′47″E
- Status: Operational
- Commission date: February 2012
- Owner: Aitken Spence
- Operator: Ace Wind Power

Wind farm
- Type: Onshore

Power generation
- Units operational: 12 × 0.25 MW
- Make and model: Unknown (12)
- Nameplate capacity: 3 MW

External links
- Commons: Related media on Commons

The Ambewela Aitken Spence Wind Farm is a small wind farm in Ambewela, owned and operated by Ace Wind Power, a subsidiary of Aitken Spence. As of October 2012, it is one of the only few operating multi-megawatt wind farms in Sri Lanka. The wind farm consists of 12 wind turbines of 250 KW each, totalling the plant installed capacity to 3 megawatts. The wind turbines are of type HSW 250T, originally built 1992.

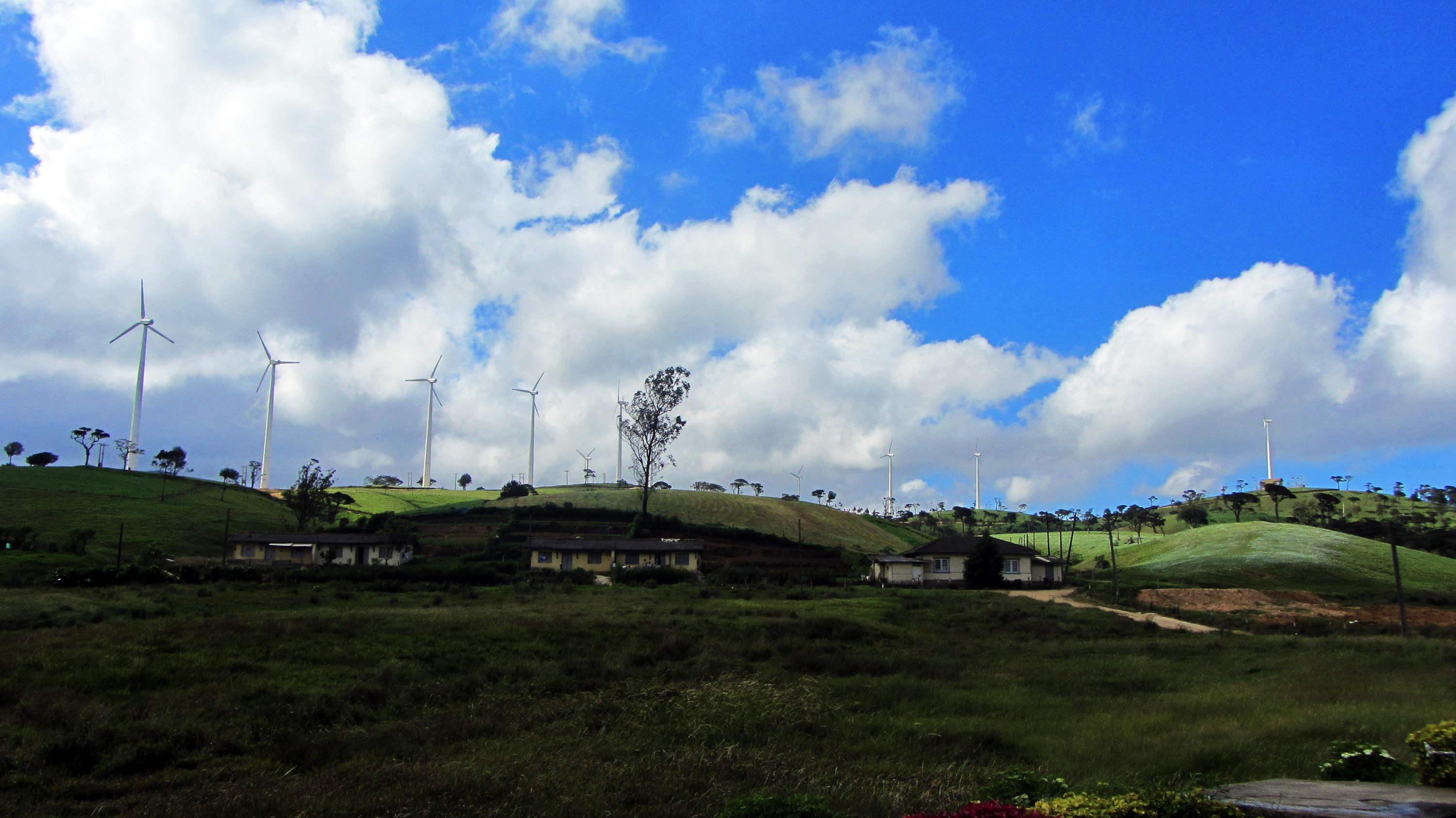
Ten of the 12 wind turbines at Ambewela.

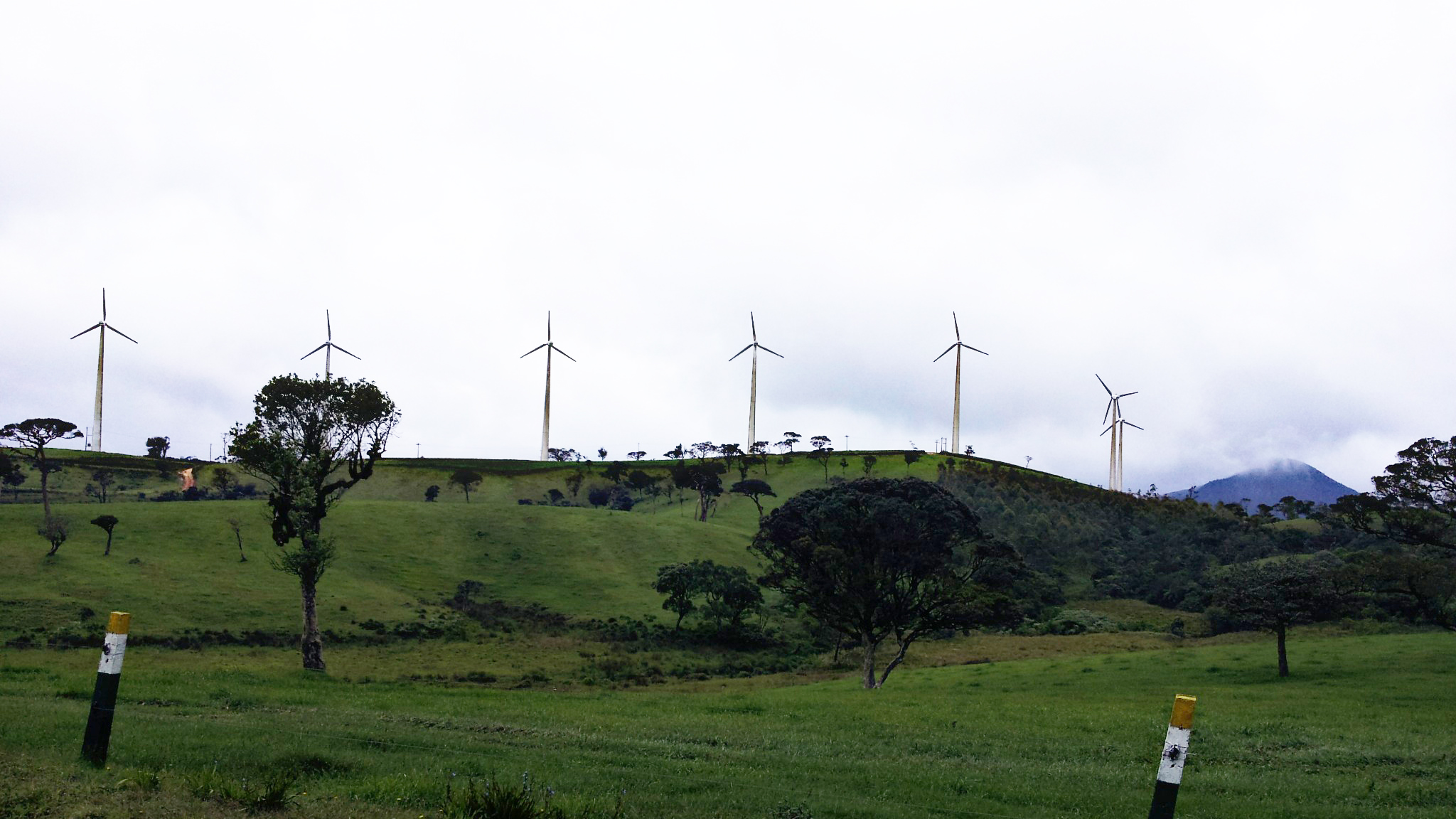
Winder power system in Ambewela, Nuwara Eliya

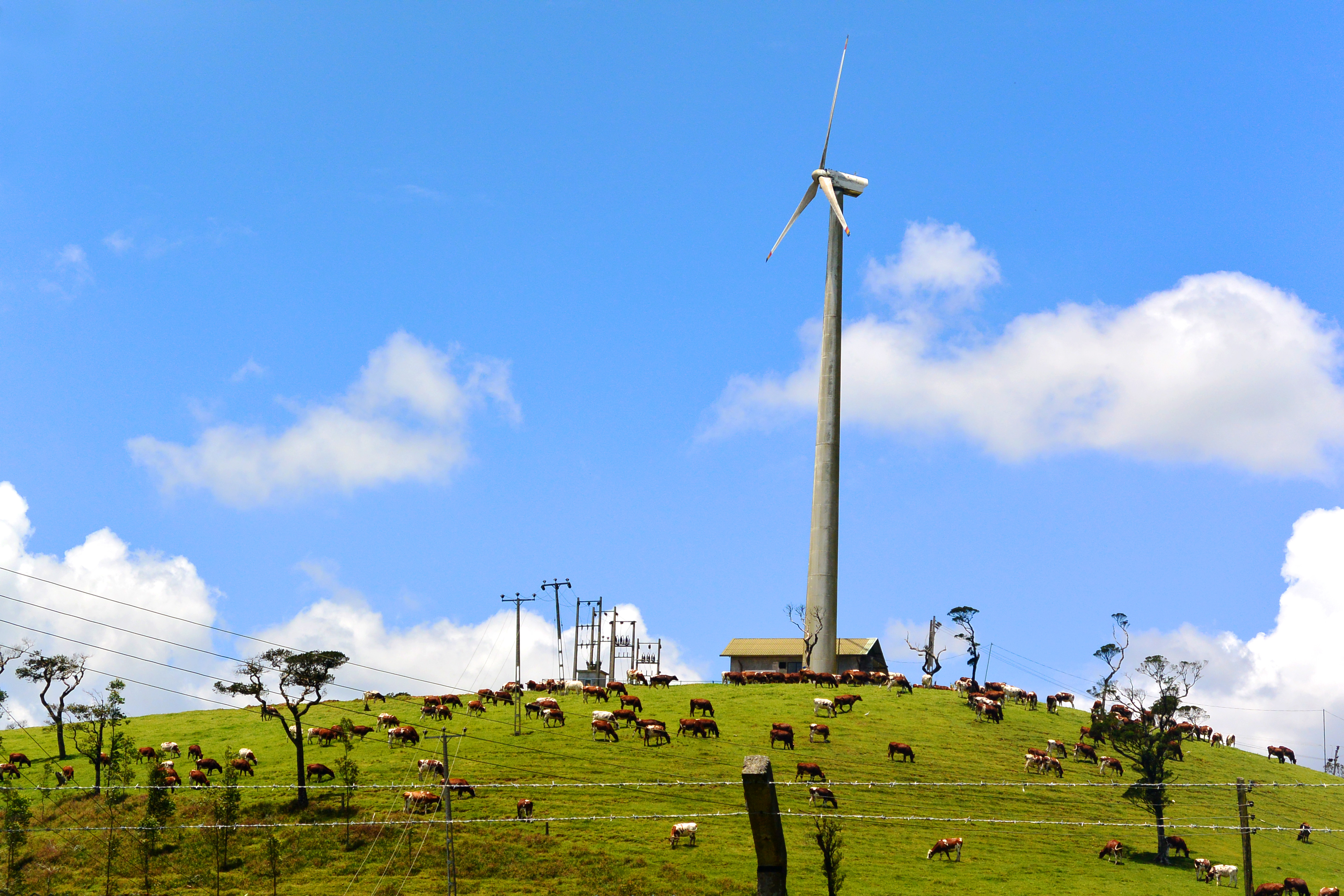
Ambewela wind farm and cows from Ambewela dairy farm.

== See also ==
- Electricity in Sri Lanka
- List of power stations in Sri Lanka
