= Lanka Bell =

Lanka Bell Limited
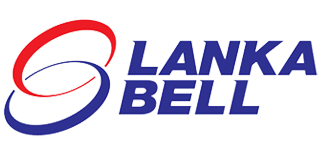
- Native name: ලංකා බෙල් ලිමිටඩ්
- Company type: Private Company
- Industry: Telecommunications
- Founded: 1997; 29 years ago Colombo, Sri Lanka
- Defunct: 2024
- Fate: Shutdown Operations
- Headquarters: Colombo 03, Sri Lanka
- Area served: Sri Lanka
- Key people: D. H. S. Jayawardene (Chairman); T K Aruna Samarasinghe (Managing Director)
- Products: Fixedline Telephone services Internet services Wireless Broadband
- Parent: Milford Holdings (Private) Limited
- Subsidiaries: Bell Solutions(Pvt) Ltd; Bell Active (Pvt) Ltd
- Website: web.archive.org/web/20230830042232/https://lankabell.net/ (Archived link)

Lanka Bell (Sinhala: ලංකා බෙල් ලිමිටඩ්, romanized: Laṃkā Bel Limiṭaḍ) was the largest fixed wireless operator and the 3rd largest fixed phone operator with an island wide digital wireless network in Sri Lanka.

Lanka Bell was formed in 1997 as the single largest BOI Company in Sri Lanka with an investment of over US$150 Million. It was subsequently acquired by the privately held diversified conglomerate Milford Holdings (Private) Limited in 2005.

Due to its financial issues to maintain the service, Lanka Bell ceased its operations in 2024, gradually transferring their clients to other networks such as SLTMobitel.

== Lanka Bell Services ==
- Fixed wireless telephone services
- Broadband Internet (4G LTE)
- Internet leased lines
- International private leased circuit
- Managed Services
- Internet Data Center
- Virtual Private Networks
- Multiprotocol Label Switching (MPLS) Services
- Bell Fax (soft Fax solution)

Bulk SMS Solutions Voice Solutions E1/SIP Trunks
