= Harry Jayawardena =

Sri Lankan industrialist (1942–2025)

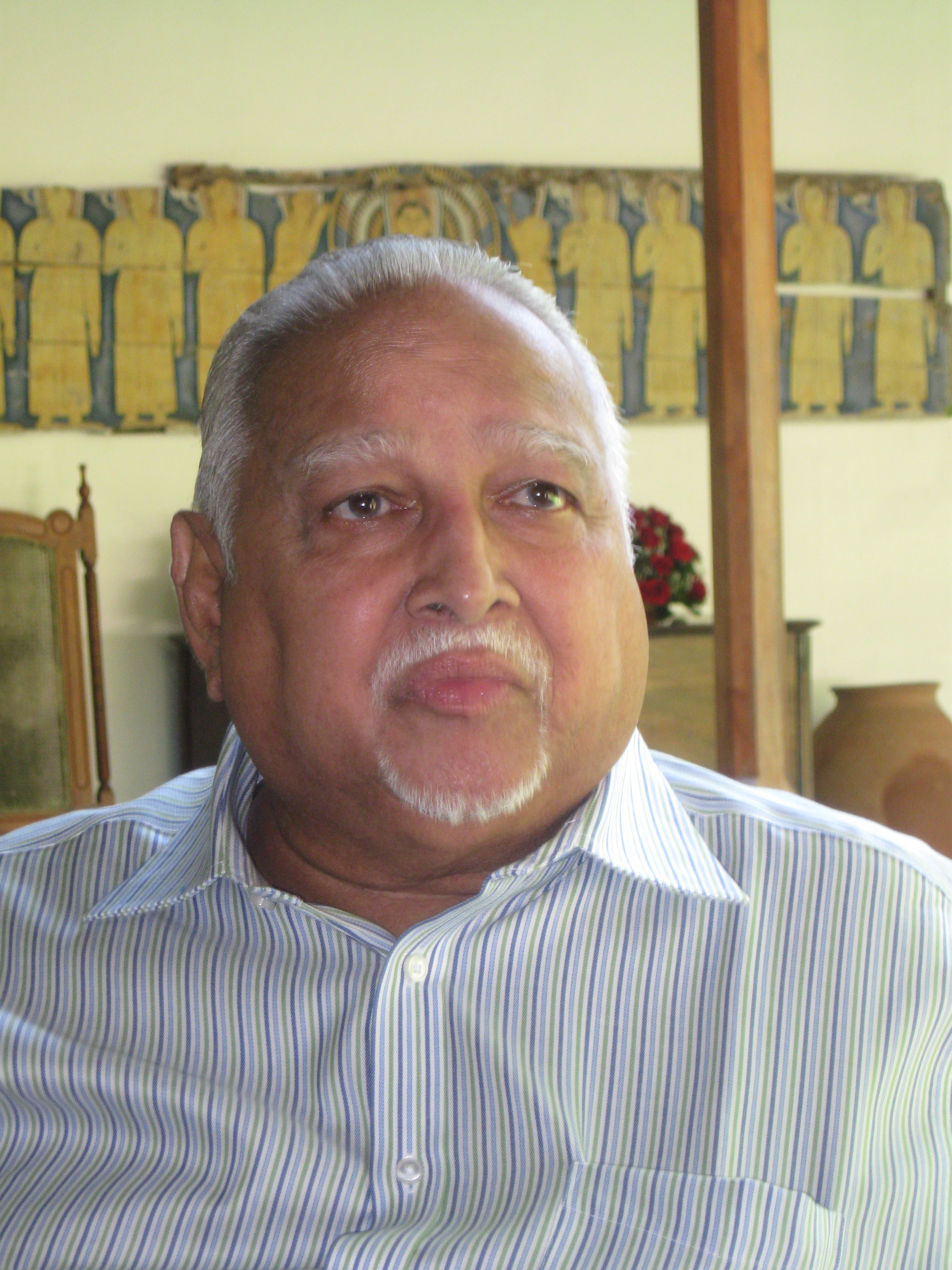
- Born: Don Harold Stassen Jayawardena; 17 August 1942; Ja-Ela, British Ceylon
- Died: 3 February 2025 (aged 82); Colombo, Sri Lanka
- Occupation: Businessman
- Years active: 1977–2025
- Known for: Chairman of Melstacorp
- Spouse: Priya Jayawardena
- Children: 2 (Stasshani Jayawardena)

Deshamanya Don Harold Stassen Jayawardena (17 August 1942 – 3 February 2025), known as Harry Jayawardena, was a Sri Lankan industrialist. He was the chairman of Melstacorp PLC and was the Honorary Consul General for Denmark in Sri Lanka. Forbes listed him as one of the richest people in Sri Lanka. His daughter Stasshani Jayawardena was appointed as the chairperson of Aitken Space after his death.

== Career ==
=== Early career ===
Jayawardena first joined a British-owned tea export firm in Santha as a tea trader. He moved to the government-owned State Trading Corporation (Consolidated Exports), better known as Consolexpo Ltd, becoming the head of the Tea Department, which controlled the monopoly of tea exports of Sri Lanka under the administration of Prime Minister Sirima Bandaranaike in the 1970s.

=== Private sector ===
After resigning from Consolidated Exports, Jayawardena founded Stassen Exports Limited on 7 September 1977 to export Ceylon Tea. In 1988 Jayawardena's companies became a significant shareholder of the country's largest private commercial bank, Hatton National Bank. These companies later ventured into many other areas. In 1992, his business empire bought a controlling interest in the Distilleries Company of Sri Lanka PLC (DCSL), which was at the time the largest transaction in the Colombo Stock Exchange. In 2007, under Jayawardena's Chairmanship, DCSL became the No. 1 listed company as per the "Business Today" Top 10 rankings.

=== Controversy ===
In December 2006, an alleged attempt to remove the Chairman of the Distilleries Company of Sri Lanka, Jayawardena, then managing director of DCSL, was allegedly quoted as threatening to shoot the chairman. Subsequently, Harry Jayawardena assumed duties as the Chairman of DCSL. The same newspaper alleged that Jayawardena threatened a customs officer, many years back.

Jayawardena announced his voluntary resignation from CPC (Ceylon Petroleum Corporation) on 12, January 2012, a post given by Sri Lankan President Mahinda Rajapaksa. Due to his personal issues, he announced his resignation.

=== Business interests ===
Jayawardena was a major shareholder and chairman of the board of directors of the following Colombo Stock Exchange companies:

- Distilleries Company of Sri Lanka
- Lanka Milk Foods – Chairman/Founder
- Madulsima Plantations – Chairman/managing director
- Balangoda Plantations – Chairman/managing director
- Browns Beach Hotels
- Aitken Spence
- Aitken Spence Hotel Holdings
- Melstacorp

Jayawardena had interests in these publicly traded companies:

- Hatton National Bank
- Development Finance Corporation of Ceylon (DFCC)

And in these private companies:

- Stassen Group
- Milford Exports
- Lanka Dairies
- Ambewela Livestock Company
- Pattipola Livestock Company
- Lanka Bell
- Continental Insurance Lanka
- Bellavantage Pvt Ltd

== Death ==
Jayawardena died in Colombo, Sri Lanka on 3 February 2025, at the age of 82.

== Honours ==
Jayawardena was awarded the title of Deshamanya by the President of Sri Lanka for his services to the industry in 2005. In 2010, he was appointed Knight of the Order of Dannebrog by Queen Margrethe II for his services to Denmark as its Honorary Consul General in Sri Lanka. He received the award for his outstanding and exemplary contribution to Denmark and for fostering bilateral ties between Sri Lanka and Denmark.

=== Company awards and recognition ===
Jayawardena was the chairman of both Distilleries Company of Sri Lanka and Aitken Spence, these companies were the first Sri Lankan companies ever to be listed on the Forbes List of best managed companies outside the USA. In 2007, Distilleries Company of Sri Lanka PLC was the sole Sri Lankan company to be listed once again in the Forbes List of Asia's best 200 under a US$1 Billion.

=== Honorary positions ===
Jayawardena held honorary positions including the Senior Adviser for International Trade and Foreign Investments to the then Sri Lankan President Chandrika Kumaratunga. He was a member of Colombo Stock Exchange for many years. He was a member of the Apex Task Force to Rebuild the Nation (TAFREN) established by the President of Sri Lanka after the December 2004 tsunami. He was also appointed Chairman of SriLankan Airlines, Sri Lanka's National carrier, becoming Executive chairman in January 2008.
