= Pearl Protectors =

Marine conservation organisation based in Sri Lanka

- Formation: 2018
- Type: Non-governmental Organization
- Purpose: Marine Conservation, Volunteerism, Youth engagement, Advocacy
- Location: Sri Lanka
- Website: pearlprotectors.org

Pearl Protectors is a youth-led marine conservation organisation. Established in 2018, the Pearl Protectors seek to reduce plastic pollution and conserve the marine environment through youth engagement, volunteerism, awareness and advocacy.

== Projects ==
=== Nurdle Free Lanka ===
In the wake of the MV X-Press Pearl maritime disaster, the Pearl Protectors initiated the Nurdle Free Lanka campaign to mobilise volunteers to clean nurdles, educate the public and advocate for nurdle spills to be prevented at the source domestically with a petition.

=== 'Pearl Protector Approved' ===
The Pearl Protectors is known for the launching of the 'Pearl Protector Approved' Accredited Standardisation Certificate a certificate that for the first time recognises restaurants and food vendors in Sri Lanka that eliminate single-use plastic items based on three levels of commitments. The certificate has been adapted by Ranbath Organics and Café Kumbuk.

=== Turtle Patrol ===
Turtle Patrol is an annual project by the Pearl Protectors that involves volunteers to patrol the Colombo beaches throughout the nesting season. The project helps protect sea turtle eggs from illegal poachers.

=== Cleaner Seabeds of Sri Lanka ===
Cleaner Seabeds of Sri Lanka aims to keep Sri Lanka's coral reefs and the seabed free from plastic pollution. The Pearl Protectors produced a documentary on underwater plastic pollution.

=== Campaigns ===
The Pearl Protectors advocate for policies to ban single-use plastic items, maintains a volunteer platform, constructs a Christmas tree annually out of discarded plastic bottles accumulated from beaches and displays it at Wellawatte Beach to highlight single-use plastic pollution, mobilises volunteers to help cleanup efforts during maritime accidents like oil spills, host educational events, conducts school and public awareness sessions and workshops, carries out beach cleanups, conducts advocacy research, advocates for Environmental Impact Assessments to be carried out for development projects and aquaculture in the coastal zone, volunteers to rescue stranded marine life, advocates against unethical fishing practices, collaborates with AIESEC Sri Lanka for youth-engagement in marine environmental protection and promotes upcycling.

== See also ==
- World Oceans Day
- World Cleanup Day
