= Melstacorp =

Sri Lankan conglomerate

Melstacorp PLC
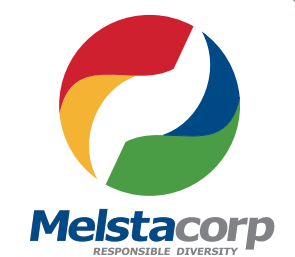
- Logo of Melstacorp
- Company type: Public
- Traded as: CSE: MELS.N0000
- ISIN: LK0450N00003
- Industry: Beverages; Diversified; Financial services; IT/BPO; Manufacturing; Health; Telecommunications; Plantation; Power; Hospitality; Logistics; Media
- Founded: February 3, 1998; 28 years ago
- Headquarters: Colombo, Sri Lanka
- Key people: Hasitha Jayawardena (Chairman); Jude Fernando (Group CEO)
- Revenue: ▲LKR182.990 billion (2022)
- Operating income: ▲LKR22.651 billion (2022)
- Net income: ▲LKR17.635 billion (2022)
- Total assets: ▲LKR311.947 billion (2022)
- Total equity: ▲LKR136.333 billion (2022)
- Number of employees: ▲22,765 (2022)
- Parent: Milford Exports (42.802%)
- Subsidiaries: See text
- Website: melstacorp.com

Melstacorp PLC is a Sri Lankan diversified conglomerate. It is listed in the Colombo Stock Exchange. Melstacorp PLC is one of the 10 largest listed companies. It has a market capitalization of approximately US$450 million.

Hasitha Jayawardena is the chairman of the company while Jude Fernando functions as the group CEO.

== History ==
Melstacorp PLC was originally formed as Beruwala Distillery (Private) Limited in 1995. Distilleries Company of Sri Lanka (DCSL) acquired the company and renamed it Melstacorp Limited in order to subsequently make it the holding Company of the then DCSL group. All subsidiary companies of DCSL were transferred to the Company between 2010 and 2015. In 2016 through a 180-degree share swap, Melstacorp became the holding company of DCSL.

After the share swap, Melstacorp was listed in the Colombo Stock Exchange on 30 December 2016.

== Subsidiaries ==
Melstacorp subsidiaries are involved in industries such as Distilling, bottling and distribution of liquor, Insurance, Health, Manufacturing, Logistics, ICT, Telecommunications, Energy, Tea and Rubber Plantations, Hospitality, Property Development, Brand Management, and in Advertising.

It is the holding company of Distilleries Company of Sri Lanka PLC.

Holdings
| Subsidiary | Holding | Market value/Cost LKR (mns) |
|---|---|---|
Quoted subsidiaries
| Aitken Spence PLC | 50.32% | 15,058 |
| Balangoda Plantations PLC | 58.61% | 241 |
| Browns Beach Hotel PLC | 41.88% | 488 |
| Distilleries Company of Sri Lanka PLC | 92.44% | 57,831 |
| Madulsima Plantations PLC | 55.91% | 871 |
Unquoted subsidiaries
| Bellvantage (Pvt) Limited | 100% | 75 |
| Bogo Power (Pvt) Limited | 99.30% | 993 |
| Continental Insurance Lanka Limited | 100% | 1,164 |
| Melsta Health (Pvt) Ltd | 100% | 1,896 |
| Melsta Logistics (Pvt) Limited | 100% | 571 |
| Melsta Properties (Pvt) Limited | 100% | 1,590 |
| Melsta Technologies (Pvt) Limited | 100% | 10 |
| Melsta Tower (Pvt) Limited | 100% | 658 |
| Milford Holdings (Pvt) Limited | 98.36% | 3,350 |
| Periceyl (Pvt) Limited | 100% | 7 |
| Splendor Media (Pvt) Limited | 100% | 51 |
| Timpex (Pvt) Limited | 51.03% | 157 |
