= Brown and Company =

Sri Lankan conglomerate holding company

Brown and Company PLC
- Logo of Brown and Company
- Type: Public
- Traded as: CSE: BRWN.N0000
- ISIN: LK0018N00008
- Industry: Holding company
- Founded: 1875; 151 years ago in Hatton, Sri Lanka
- Founder: James Brown
- Headquarters: Colombo, Sri Lanka
- Key people: Ishara Nanayakkara (Executive Chairman); Kapila Jayawardena (Non-executive Director)
- Revenue: ▲LKR72,652 million (2023)
- Operating income: ▼LKR(11,108) million (2023)
- Net income: ▼LKR(12,528) million (2023)
- Total assets: ▲LKR466,854 million (2023)
- Total equity: ▼LKR72,642 million (2023)
- Number of employees: ▲597 (2023)
- Parent: LOLC Holdings
- Subsidiaries: See text
- Website: www.brownsgroup.com

Brown and Company PLC, sometimes called Browns Group, is a conglomerate holding company in Sri Lanka. The company was founded by James Brown, a 25-year-old engineer and mechanic from London who arrived in Ceylon in 1872. In 1892, the company was incorporated and in 1991 the company became a listed company on the Colombo Stock Exchange. The company was included in S&P Sri Lanka 20 Index in June 2021. Brown and Company is one of the LMD 100 companies, an annual list of Sri Lankan listed companies by revenue, having ranked 42nd in the 2020/21 edition.

== History ==
The company was founded by James Brown, a 25-year-old engineer and mechanic from Hampstead, London who arrived in Ceylon in 1872. Brown and Company was established in 1875 and the company engaged in importing and repairing agricultural machinery. In 1892, Brown and Company was incorporated as a limited liability company. The company expanded to Nawalapitiya and Colombo in 1897. in 1947, the company was renamed Brown and Company and brought the total share of Hatton National Bank and Hatton Transport and Agency Company. In 1959, the company became a "Ceylonese Company" with a Ceylonese trader's licence. Manufacturing of automotive batteries was commenced in 1961 by the company.

In 2012, LOLC acquired a controlling stake of Brown and Company for LKR1.32 billion. In 2015, Brown & Company set up a green tea factory at Norwood Estate owned by Bogawantalawa Plantations PLC.

== Operations ==
Browns Investments PLC, an investment company, is a subsidiary of Brown and Company. With an LKR10 billion investment Brown and Company increased its stake in the subsidiary to 46% from 33% in 2020. In 2022 March, the company announced a debenture issue worth LKR2 billion. LOLC Holdings provided the corporate guarantee for the issue and National Development Bank was the manager of the issue. ICRA Lanka adjudged the issue as an A Credit Enhancement rating with a stable outlook. The company was awarded the silver award in the trading companies category at the 54th Annual Report Awards in 2018. The awards ceremony is organised by the Institute of Chartered Accountants of Sri Lanka and the ceremony was held at Shangri-La Colombo. Due to the growing prospects in the apparel industry, the company is planning to invest LKR15.3 billion in a state of the art textile plant in Kurunegala District. James Finlay, a company that conducted business in Sri Lanka since 1895, divested its stake at Hapugastenne and Udapussellawa Plantations, two tea plantation companies, to Browns for LKR1.9 billion in 2022.

=== Controversies ===
A national audit has revealed irregular dealings at the Hingurana sugar factory which is run as a public-private partnership between the government of Sri Lanka, Brown and Company, and LOLC Holdings. It has revealed that billions worth of loans were taken from LOLC-associated companies at higher interest rates. A forensic audit carried out by KPMG revealed that the Employees' Provident Fund (EPF) had bought stocks in Brown and Company worth LKR737 million without approval from its investment committee. In some cases, the deal ticket of the transaction was unsigned, therefore the dealer could not be identified. As a result, EPF has made a loss of LKR1.1 billion.

=== Quoted subsidiaries ===
Subsidiary	Group holding	Activity
Browns Investments PLC	64.55%	Holding company
Eden Hotel Lanka PLC	89.38%	Hotelier
Palm Garden Hotels PLC	89.38%	Hotelier
Serendib Hotels PLC	55.75%	Hotelier
Dolphin Hotels PLC	69.33%	Hotelier
Hotel Sigiriya PLC	64.29%	Hotelier
Hapugastenne Plantations PLC	90%	Plantations
Udapussellawa Plantations PLC	90%	Plantations
Agstar PLC	55%	Trading

Source: Annual Report, 2022/23 (pp. 119–120)

== See also ==
- List of companies listed on the Colombo Stock Exchange
- List of Sri Lankan public corporations by market capitalisation
