= Sierra Cables =

Sri Lankan cable manufacturer

Sierra Cables PLC
- Logo of Sierra Cables
- Company type: Public
- Traded as: CSE: SIRA.N0000
- ISIN: LK0351N00003
- Industry: Building materials
- Founded: 1999; 27 years ago
- Headquarters: Kaduwela, Sri Lanka
- Key people: W. A. P. Perera (Chairman); Harsha Jayatunga (CEO)
- Revenue: ▼LKR7.069 billion (2023)
- Operating income: ▲LKR1.726 billion (2023)
- Net income: ▲LKR703 million (2023)
- Total assets: ▼LKR7.691 billion (2023)
- Total equity: ▲LKR4.310 billion (2023)
- Owners: Iconic Trust (Pvt) Ltd (29.18%); Sierra Holdings (Pvt) Ltd (26.67%); Hatton National Bank/Almas Holdings (Pvt) Ltd (10.49%)
- Subsidiaries: See text
- Rating: Fitch Ratings: A+(lka)
- Website: www.sierracables.com

Sierra Cables PLC is a cable manufacturing company in Sri Lanka. Sierra Cables was incorporated in 1999 as a part of Sierra Construction. The company became a public company with an LKR600 million initial public offering in 2005. Sierra Cables moved to build a manufacturing plant in Kenya in 2015. The following year, the company planned to establish its second foreign operations in Fiji. In 2018, the company was transferred to the Watch List by the Colombo Stock Exchange due to going concerns over two of its subsidiaries including, its East African operations.

Sierra Cables is the third largest player in the cable market of the country. Sri Lankan investment company, Almas, and its related party acquired over 10% stake in the company. At the onset of the COVID-19 pandemic, the company forecasted its revenue would take a LKR1 billion hit. Browns Investments' subsidiary, Iconic Trust, acquired a 29.5% stake in the company as part of a larger acquisition deal. Sierra Cables is an LMD 100 company in Sri Lanka. LMD 100 lists public companies in Sri Lanka by revenue annually. Sierra Cables is also one of the 100 most valuable brands in the country.

== History ==
Sierra Cables Limited was incorporated in 1999 and was a wholly owned subsidiary of Sierra Construction Ltd. Sierra Cables acquired Alucop Cables, established in 1978, and the factory relocated to Kaduwela. Alucop Cables started manufacturing enameled wires in 1995 but was unable to compete with the market leader, Kelani Cables. When ACL Cables acquired Kelani Cables in 1999, some of Kelani Cables managerial and marketing staff joined Alucop Cables. Sierra Cables went public with a LKR600 million initial public offering in October 2005. Ceylon Electricity Board was the principal client of the company at the time. Sierra Cables exported 80% of its production to India. Sierra Cables merged with its subsidiary Alucop Cables in 2010. The company expressed its intentions to venture into power sector and leisure sector in 2011. Higher profitability, and opportunities that arose after the Civil War were cited as reasons for the expansion.

An LKR172 million fraud was detected in the company in 2014. The company requested the Colombo Stock Exchange to suspend the trading of its shares. Misstatements in accounting running from 2010 to 2014 have been discovered. The company's auditors, KPMG, were called upon to submit a preliminary report. Sierra Cables moved establish a manufacturing plant in Kenya in 2015. The company was planning to capitalise on Kenya's 6% expected economic growth in 2015. In 2016, the company planned to set up its second foreign operations by investing US$4 million to build a plant in Fiji. The new operation was a joint venture with three other Fijian corporations. Sierra Cables agreed to invest 30% of the venture and provide the technical expertise.

In 2018, Sierra Cables was transferred to the Watch List by the Colombo Stock Exchange due to the company's auditors' opinion of going concern of two of its subsidiaries. Concerns were raised regarding Sierra Cables' Kenyan subsidiary, Sierra Cables East Africa Limited and its domestic subsidiary, Sierra Industries (Pvt) Ltd. The distresses of the subsidiaries lingered on to 2019, and the company reiterated its intention of reviving the subsidiaries. The volatile political situation was blamed for the distress of the East African subsidiary.

== Operations ==
Sierra Cables is the third largest player in the Sri Lankan cable market, trailing ACL Cables and its subsidiary Kelani Cables. Sri Lankan investment company Almas and its related party Carlines Holdings increased its stake in Sierra Cables to over 10% in 2020. They were the second and the third largest shareholders of the company at the time. At the onset of the COVID-19 pandemic in Sri Lanka, the company forecasted that the company's revenue for the financial year 2019/20 would take a LKR1 billion hit. In the wake of the pandemic, Fitch Ratings downgraded the company's credit rating to BB(lka). The rating agency placed the company Rating Watch Negative in its credit outlook. Browns Investments acquired LKR4.6 billion worth assets in the Sierra Group in 2022. Accordingly, Iconic Trust, a subsidiary of Browns Investments, acquired 29.5% of shares in Sierra Cables from Sierra Cables for LKR1.79 billion. Iconic Trust also purchased AgStar PLC and Sansun Boutique (Elephant Corridor Hotel) from the Sierra Group.

In January 2023, Fitch Ratings assigned an 'A+(lka)' credit rating and the credit outlook was adjudged to be Stable. Weak domestic demand and increased focus on exports were among the factors that justified the rating. Sierra Cables is one the LMD 100 companies in Sri Lanka. LMD 100 lists Sri Lankan public companies by revenue annually and in its 2022/23 rankings, Sierra Cables ranked 91st, a two-position improvement from the last year. Sierra Cables also ranked among the 100 most valuable brands in Sri Lanka. Brand Finance estimated the brand value of Sierra Cables to be LKR502 million in 2023.

=== Subsidiaries ===
Company	Activity	Cost/Fair value LKR (mns)	Group holding
Sierra Industries (Private) Limited	Manufacturing of uPVC pipes	265	90.72%
Sierra Cables East Africa Limited, Kenya	Manufacture and sale of wires and cables	182	95%
Associate companies
Tea Leaf Resort (Private) Limited	Leisure sector	2.5	49.9%
T & G Lanka (Private) Limited	Manufacturing cables	100.6	22%
Joint venture
Cables PTE Limited, Fiji	Manufacturing cables	28	30%

Source: Annual Report, 2022/23

== See also ==
- List of companies listed on the Colombo Stock Exchange
