= Lankem Ceylon =

Manufacturing company in Sri Lanka

Lankem Ceylon PLC
- Logo of Lankem Ceylon

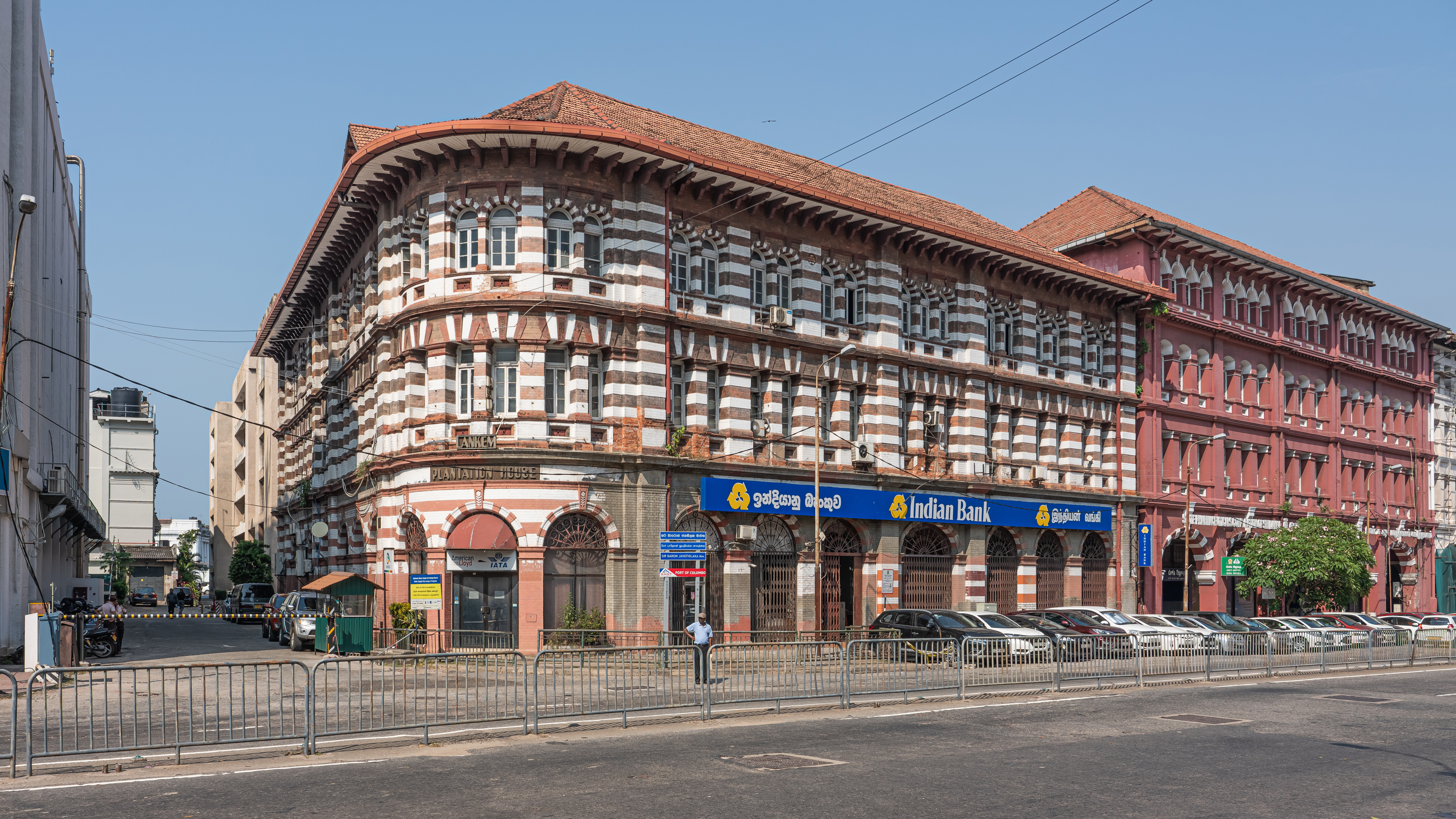
- Lankem Plantation House in Colombo Fort is a property owned by the company's parent
- Company type: Public
- Traded as: CSE: LCEY.N0000
- ISIN: LK0115N00002
- Industry: Capital goods
- Founded: September 15, 1964; 61 years ago
- Founder: Royal Dutch Shell
- Headquarters: Colombo, Sri Lanka
- Key people: S. D. R. Arudpragasam (Chairman); A. Hettiarachchy (Deputy chairman); P. S. Goonewardene (Managing director)
- Brands: Lankem Robbialac
- Revenue: ▲LKR33,754 million (2023)
- Operating income: ▲LKR2,967 million (2023)
- Net income: ▲LKR2,282 million (2023)
- Total assets: ▲LKR26,072 million (2023)
- Total equity: ▲LKR7,195 million (2023)
- Owner: The Colombo Fort Land & Building PLC (60.19%); Amana Bank/E. B. Creasy & Company PLC (17.51%)
- Parent: The Colombo Fort Land & Building PLC
- Subsidiaries: C. W. Mackie PLC; Sigiriya Village Hotels PLC; Marawila Resorts PLC; Beruwala Resorts PLC; Galle Fort Hotel; J.F. Packaging Ltd.; ACME Printing & Packaging PLC; Consolidated Tea Plantations Ltd (associate company)
- Website: www.lankem.lk

Lankem Ceylon PLC is a chemicals, paints and consumer goods manufacturing company in Sri Lanka. The company also engaged in the hospitality industry by owning and operating resorts in Sri Lanka. The company is incorporated in 1964 by Royal Dutch Shell and listed on the Colombo Stock Exchange in 1970. Brand Finance ranked the company 88th most valuable brand in Sri Lanka. The company ranked 61st in LMD 100, an annual list of quoted companies by revenue in the financial year 2019–20.

== History ==
Lankem Ceylon was incorporated as Shell Chemical Company of Ceylon Limited by Royal Dutch Shell in 1964 as an agrochemical company. In 2010, Lankem Ceylon acquired C. W. Mackie. A new plant manufacturing paint thinner and chemical was inaugurated in Sapugaskanda in 2012 at cost of LKR120 million. Lankem Chemical Ltd, a subsidiary of Lankem Ceylon is the largest manufacturer and importer of paint thinner in Sri Lanka.

== Operations ==
A 2017 study found the company is not following contemporary management accounting practices such as activity-based costing, activity-based management, and balanced scorecard. Suren Goonewardene was appointed as the managing director of the company in June 2020. ICRA Lanka Limited has withdrawn its rating of [SL]D at the company request in September 2020. In June 2021, company's LKR677 million rights issue went undersubscribed. The company was able to raise only LKR352.3 million. Despite disruptions to the supply chain, the company posted a profit in the fourth quarter of the financial year 2020–21 for the first time since 2014–15. The gross profit of LKR827 million is an increase of 46 per cent when compared to 2019–20. The company is one of the partners of the Sri Lanka Institute of Nanotechnology along with other private sector companies and the Ministry of Technology.

=== Acquiring ACME Printing & Packaging ===
The second-largest shareholder of ACME Printing & Packaging PLC, Richardson Holdings Ltd. divested its stake of 19.43 per cent of the company. E. B. Creasy & Company, an associate company of Lankem Ceylon acquired the stake increasing Lankem Ceylon and related parties' shares to 32.17 per cent. This resulted in Lankem Ceylon being required to make an offer to purchase the rest of the ordinary shares according to the 1995 Company Takeovers and Mergers Code. On 16 September 2021, Lankem Ceylon submitted an application to the Securities and Exchange Commission of Sri Lanka with an offer price of LKR12.00 per share. Lankem Ceylon was able to increase its stake in ACME Printing & Packaging to 88.27 per cent thus becoming the controlling shareholder of the company. Most of the minority shareholders responded positively to Lankem Ceylon's mandatory offer.

== Corporate Social Responsibility ==
In September 2023, C. W. Mackie PLC, a subsidiary of Lankem Ceylon, renovated the Accident and Emergency Ward and built a mini‑surgical theatre at the Anuradhapura Teaching Hospital, significantly enhancing emergency and surgical care. The project was lauded by Dr. Dulan Samaraweera, Acting Director of the hospital, as an important advance in local healthcare infrastructure.

== See also ==
- List of companies listed on the Colombo Stock Exchange
