= E. B. Creasy & Company =

Conglomerate company in Sri Lanka

E. B. Creasy & Company PLC
- Logo of E.B Creasy & Co. PLC

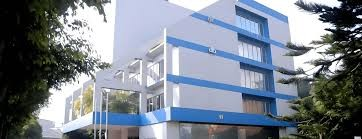
- E.B Creasy & Co. PLC headquarters located in Colombo
- Type: Public
- Traded as: CSE: EBCR.N0000
- ISIN: LK0059N00002
- Industry: FMCG; Healthcare; Food; Steel; Energy
- Founded: 1878; 148 years ago
- Founder: Mr. Edward Bennet Creasy
- Headquarters: Colombo 10, Sri Lanka, Colombo, Sri Lanka
- Key people: S. D. R. Arudpragasam (Chairman and Managing Director); S. Rajaratnam (Joint Managing Director)
- Revenue: ▲LKR23,342 million (2023)
- Operating income: ▲LKR1,800 million (2023)
- Net income: ▲LKR1,510 million (2023)
- Total assets: ▲LKR20,246 million (2023)
- Total equity: ▲LKR6,807 million (2023)
- Parent: The Colombo Fort Land & Building PLC
- Subsidiaries: Darley Butler & Co. Ltd Laxapana PLC Muller & Phipps (Ceylon) PLC Muller & Phipps Healthcare Ltd Sterling Steels Ltd Lanka Special Steels Ltd Candy Delights Ltd E.B Creasy Logistics Ltd
- Website: www.ebcreasy.com

E. B. Creasy & Company PLC is a listed conglomerate holding company in Sri Lanka. The company was founded in 1878. E. B. Creasy acquired Darley Butler & Company, another one of the oldest companies in Sri Lanka in 1967. The company went public in 1968 and was listed on the Colombo Stock Exchange (CSE). E. B. Creasy & Company PLC is one of the largest conglomerates in Sri Lanka with a brand value of LKR1,538 million in 2019. The company was ranked 71st in the LMD 100, an annual list of quoted companies in Sri Lanka in 2019.

== History ==
Edward Bennet Creasy founded E. B. Creasy & Company in Colombo in 1878. By 1907, the office of the company was located on Baillie Street in Colombo Fort while Edward Bennet Creasy was still the proprietor. The founder's son Edward Bennet Creasy was managing the business. Edward Bennet Creasy was a member of the Ceylon Chamber of Commerce. E. B. Creasy & Company incorporated in 1929 as a limited liability company and was listed on the Colombo Stock Exchange in 1968. Darley Butler was formed as a partnership between Edward Darley and Samuel Butler in 1848. Darley Butler converted to a limited liability company in 1920 and was acquired by E. B. Creasy & Company in 1967.

2005 annual general meeting (AGM) of E. B. Creasy turned intense when shareholders scrutinised the performance of the company and allegations of financial irregularities. Al-Nakib, a Kuwaiti investor and the second-largest shareholder at the time, had tried to ask a question at the AGM. He was called a "troublesome foreigner" by the chairman of the company, A. Rajaratnam. Al-Nakib initiated a legal case against the company. He stated in his petition that the board of directors of E. B. Creasy acted prejudicial to the interest of the company and detrimental to the minority shareholders of the company.

== Operations ==
ICRA Lanka issued a fresh [SL]BBB credit rating for E. B. Creasy in August 2021 and the credit outlook was adjudged as stable. The company's long track record and dominant market position were cited as the rationale for the rating. Brand Finance valued the conglomerate brand value of E. B. Creasy to be LKR1,538 million in 2019. The company was ranked 18th by the conglomerate brand value. E. B. Creasy was ranked 71st in the LMD 100 2019/20 edition, an annual list of quoted companies in Sri Lanka by revenue.

E. B. Creasy acquired the whole stake of Tata Steel's Lanka Special Steels Ltd for LKR433 million in 2015. The company announced a 1-for-100 stock split in January 2021. E. B. Creasy's associate company Lankem Ceylon acquired ACME printing and Packaging following the acquisition of a 19.43% stake by E. B. Creasy. A study conducted on E. B. Creasy regarding employee retention has found that managers' emotional intelligence has a positive relationship with employee retention.

== See also ==
- List of companies listed on the Colombo Stock Exchange
