= Harischandra Mills =

Sri Lankan food processing company

Harischandra Mills PLC
- Logo of Harischandra Mills PLC
- Company type: Public
- Traded as: CSE: HARI.N0000
- ISIN: LK0077N00004
- Industry: Food
- Founded: January 9, 1953; 73 years ago in Matara, Sri Lanka
- Founder: C. A. Harischandra
- Headquarters: Matara, Sri Lanka
- Key people: M. A. Bastiansz (Chairman); S. N. Samarasinghe (Managing Director)
- Revenue: ▲LKR4,581 million (2022)
- Operating income: ▲LKR261 million (2022)
- Net income: ▲LKR209 million (2022)
- Total assets: ▲LKR2,290 million (2022)
- Total equity: ▲LKR1,607 million (2022)
- Owners: Senthilverl Holdings (Pvt) Ltd (26.46%); U. De Silva (14.95%); C. P. Rodrigo (14.53%); R. K. Samarasinghe (14.07%); T. Senthilverl (13.94%)
- Number of employees: 643 (2022)
- Subsidiaries: Harischandra Mills (Distributors) Ltd
- Website: harischandramills.com

Harischandra Mills PLC is a food processing company in Sri Lanka.

== History ==
Harischandra Mills was founded by C. A. Harischandra in 1943. Harischandra was the fourth son of Canduda Arachchige Odiris de Silva, a wealthy businessman. In 1938, Harischandra returned to his native Matara after graduating from the University of Colombo with a degree in economics. He initially managed his father's cinema and printing press before deciding to start a business of his own. He founded Harischandra Mills in 1943 with a capital of LKR25,000 on a plot of land of 20 perches in Matara. The company commenced a provident fund in 1952 and it precedes the government instituted Employees' Provident Fund by six years. Harischandra Mills was incorporated as a limited liability company in 1953. In 1959, the company was converted into a public company and allocated 40% of its stocks to employees. Harischandra Mills was listed on the Colombo Stock Exchange in 1983.

== Operations ==
Harischandra Mills is still a family-managed company despite 41.17% public holding. S. N. Samarasinghe, the grandson of C. A. Harischandra is the managing director of the company. Harischandra is a household name for coffee, noodles, Kurakkan flour and Ulundu flour. The company also has a sizeable market share in rice flour, laundry bar soap and blue soap. Since family businesses' success depends on a smooth transition of leadership, a study found the need for Harischanda Mills to have a solid succession plan.

A study conducted on the impact of corporate social responsibilities of Harischandra Mills concluded that even though the company abide by environmental laws and regulations, the company does not engage in environmental conservation programmes. The released smoky air and wastewater have caused problems for the community. Harischandra is one of the 100 most valuable brands in Sri Lanka. In 2022, the brand value of Harschandra is LKR1,254 million. Harischandra Mills is placed 19th on the "second board" of LMD 100 rankings in the 2020/21 edition, an annual list of quoted companies in Sri Lanka by revenue. In 2020, the import ban on several agricultural crops imposed by the government left Harischandra Mills with a scarcity of raw materials. As a result, the company slashed the production of Ulundu flour by 90%.

== See also ==
- List of companies listed on the Colombo Stock Exchange
