= List of companies listed on the Colombo Stock Exchange =

As of March 2024, the Colombo Stock Exchange (CSE) has 284 listings.

== A ==
Company name	Symbol
Abans Electricals	CSE: ABAN.N0000
Abans Finance	CSE: AFSL.N0000
Access Engineering	CSE: AEL.N0000
ACL Cables	CSE: ACL.N0000
ACL Plastics	CSE: APLA.N0000
ACME Printing & Packaging	CSE: ACME.N0000
Agalawatte Plantations	CSE: AGAL.N0000
Agarapatana Plantations	CSE: AGPL.N0000
Agstar	CSE: AGST.N0000
Aitken Spence Hotel Holdings	CSE: AHUN.N0000
Aitken Spence Plantation Managements	CSE: ASPM.N0000
Aitken Spence	CSE: SPEN.N0000
Alliance Finance Company	CSE: ALLI.N0000
Alpha Fire Services	CSE: AFS.N0000
Alumex	CSE: ALUM.N0000
Amana Bank	CSE: ABL.N0000
Amana Takaful	CSE: ATL.N0000
Amana Takaful Life	CSE: ATLL.N0000
Ambeon Capital	CSE: TAP.N0000
Ambeon Holdings	CSE: GREG.N0000
AMW Capital Leasing & Finance	CSE: AMCL.N0000
Arpico Insurance	CSE: AINS.N0000
Asia Asset Finance	CSE: AAF.N0000
Asia Capital	CSE: ACAP.N0000
Asia Siyaka Commodities	CSE: ASIY.N0000
Asian Hotels & Properties	CSE: AHPL.N0000
Asiri Hospital Holdings	CSE: ASIR.N0000
Asiri Surgical Hospital	CSE: AMSL.N0000
Associated Motor Finance Company	CSE: AMF.N0000

== B ==
Company name	Symbol
B P P L Holdings	CSE: BPPL.N0000
Bairaha Farms	CSE: BFL.N0000
Balangoda Plantations	CSE: BALA.N0000
Bansei Royal Resorts Hikkaduwa	CSE: BRR.N0000
Beruwala Resorts	CSE: BERU.N0000
Blue Diamonds Jewellery Worldwide	CSE: BLUE.N0000
Bogala Graphite Lanka	CSE: BOGA.N0000
Bogawantalawa Tea Estates	CSE: BOPL.N0000
Brown and Company	CSE: BRWN.N0000
Browns Beach Hotels	CSE: BBH.N0000
Browns Investments	CSE: BIL.N0000
Bukit Darah	CSE: BUKI.N0000

== C ==
Company name	Symbol
C M Holdings	CSE: COLO.N0000
C T Holdings	CSE: CTHR.N0000
C T Land Development	CSE: CTLD.N0000
C. W. Mackie	CSE: CWM.N0000
Capital Alliance	CSE: CALT.N0000
Cargills (Ceylon)	CSE: CARG.N0000
Cargills Bank	CSE: CBNK.N0000
Cargo Boat Development Company	CSE: CABO.N0000
Carson Cumberbatch	CSE: CARS.N0000
Central Finance Company	CSE: CFIN.N0000
Central Industries	CSE: CIND.N0000
Ceylinco Insurance	CSE: CINS.N0000
Ceylon Beverage Holdings	CSE: BREW.N0000
Ceylon Cold Stores	CSE: CCS.N0000
Ceylon Grain Elevators	CSE: GRAN.N0000
Ceylon Guardian Investment Trust	CSE: GUAR.N0000
Ceylon Hospitals	CSE: CHL.N0000
Ceylon Hotels Corporation	CSE: CHOT.N0000
Ceylon Investment	CSE: CINV.N0000
Ceylon Printers	CSE: CPRT.N0000
Ceylon Tea Brokers	CSE: CTBL.N0000
Ceylon Tobacco Company	CSE: CTC.N0000
Chemanex	CSE: CHMX.N0000
Chevron Lubricants Lanka	CSE: LLUB.N0000
Chrissworld	CSE: CWL.N0000
CIC Holdings	CSE: CIC.N0000
Citizens Development Business Finance	CSE: CDB.N0000
Citrus Leisure	CSE: REEF.N0000
Co-Operative Insurance Company	CSE: COOP.N0000
Colombo City Holdings	CSE: PHAR.N0000
Colombo Dockyard	CSE: DOCK.N0000
Colombo Fort Investments	CSE: CFI.N0000
Colombo Investment Trust	CSE: CIT.N0000
Colombo Land and Development Company	CSE: CLND.N0000
Commercial Bank of Ceylon	CSE: COMB.N0000
Commercial Credit & Finance	CSE: COCR.N0000
Commercial Development Company	CSE: COMD.N0000
Convenience Foods (Lanka)	CSE: SOY.N0000

== D ==
Company name	Symbol
Dankotuwa Porcelain	CSE: DPL.N0000
DFCC Bank	CSE: DFCC.N0000
Dialog Axiata	CSE: DIAL.N0000
Dialog Finance	CSE: CALF.N0000
Diesel & Motor Engineering	CSE: DIMO.N0000
Digital Mobility Solutions Lanka	CSE: PKME.N0000
Dilmah Ceylon Tea Company	CSE: CTEA.N0000
Dipped Products	CSE: DIPD.N0000
Distilleries Company of Sri Lanka	CSE: DIST.N0000
Dolphin Hotels	CSE: STAF.N0000

== E ==
Company name	Symbol
E. B. Creasy & Company	CSE: EBCR.N0000
E M L Consultants	CSE: EML.N0000
E-Channelling	CSE: ECL.N0000
East West Properties	CSE: EAST.N0000
Eastern Merchants	CSE: EMER.N0000
Eden Hotel Lanka	CSE: EDEN.N0000
Elpitiya Plantations	CSE: ELPL.N0000
Equity Two	CSE: ETWO.N0000
Ex-pack Corrugated Cartons	CSE: PACK.N0000
Expolanka Holdings	CSE: EXPO.N0000
Exterminators	CSE: EXT.N0000

== F ==
Company name	Symbol
First Capital Holdings	CSE: CFVF.N0000
First Capital Treasuries	CSE: FCT.N0000

== G ==
Company name	Symbol
Galadari Hotels (Lanka)	CSE: GHLL.N0000
Galle Face Capital Partners	CSE: WAPO.N0000
Gestetner of Ceylon	CSE: GEST.N0000
Greentech Energy	CSE: MEL.N0000

== H ==
Company name	Symbol
Hapugastenne Plantations	CSE: HAPU.N0000
Harischandra Mills	CSE: HARI.N0000
Hatton National Bank	CSE: HNB.N0000
Hatton Plantations	CSE: HPL.N0000
Haycarb	CSE: HAYC.N0000
Hayleys Fabric	CSE: MGT.N0000
Hayleys Fibre	CSE: HEXP.N0000
Hayleys Leisure	CSE: CONN.N0000
Hayleys	CSE: HAYL.N0000
Hela Apparel Holdings	CSE: HELA.N0000
Hemas Holdings	CSE: HHL.N0000
Hikkaduwa Beach Resort	CSE: CITH.N0000
HNB Assurance	CSE: HASU.N0000
HNB Finance	CSE: HNBF.N0000
Horana Plantations	CSE: HOPL.N0000
Hotel Sigiriya	CSE: HSIG.N0000
HDFC Bank of Sri Lanka	CSE: HDFC.N0000
hSenid Business Solutions	CSE: HBS.N0000
Hunas Holdings	CSE: HUNA.N0000
Hunters & Company	CSE: HUNT.N0000
HVA Foods	CSE: HVA.N0000

== I ==
Company name	Symbol
Industrial Asphalts (Lanka)	CSE: ASPH.N0000

== J ==
Company name	Symbol
Janashakthi Insurance	CSE: JINS.N0000
JAT Holdings	CSE: JAT.N0000
Jetwing Symphony	CSE: JETS.N0000
John Keells Holdings	CSE: JKH.N0000
John Keells Hotels	CSE: KHL.N0000
John Keells	CSE: JKL.N0000

== K ==
Company name	Symbol
Kahawatte Plantations	CSE: KAHA.N0000
Kapruka Holdings	CSE: KPHL.N0000
Keells Food Products	CSE: KFP.N0000
Kegalle Plantations	CSE: KGAL.N0000
Kelani Cables	CSE: KCAB.N0000
Kelani Tyres	CSE: TYRE.N0000
Kelani Valley Plantations	CSE: KVAL.N0000
Kelsey Developments	CSE: KDL.N0000
Kotagala Plantations	CSE: KOTA.N0000
Kotmale Holdings	CSE: LAMB.N0000

== L ==
Company name	Symbol
LB Finance	CSE: LFIN.N0000
Lake House Printers & Publishers	CSE: LPRT.N0000
Lanka Aluminium Industries	CSE: LALU.N0000
Lanka Ashok Leyland	CSE: ASHO.N0000
Lanka Ceramic	CSE: CERA.N0000
Lanka Credit & Business Finance	CSE: LCBF.N0000
Lanka IOC	CSE: LIOC.N0000
Lanka Milk Foods (CWE)	CSE: LMF.N0000
Lanka Realty Investments	CSE: ASCO.N0000
Lanka Tiles	CSE: TILE.N0000
Lanka Ventures	CSE: LVEN.N0000
Lanka Walltiles	CSE: LWL.N0000
Lankem Ceylon	CSE: LCEY.N0000
Lankem Developments	CSE: LDEV.N0000
LAUGFS Gas	CSE: LGL.N0000
LAUGFS Power	CSE: LPL.N0000
Laxapana Batteries	CSE: LITE.N0000
Lee Hedges	CSE: SHAW.N0000
Lion Brewery Ceylon	CSE: LION.N0000
LOLC Finance	CSE: LOFC.N0000
LOLC General Insurance	CSE: LGIL.N0000
LOLC Holdings	CSE: LOLC.N0000
Lotus Hydro Power	CSE: HPFL.N0000
Luminex	CSE: LUMX.N0000
LVL Energy Fund	CSE: LVEF.N0000

== M ==
Company name	Symbol
Madulsima Plantations	CSE: MADU.N0000
Maharaja Foods	CSE: MFPE.N0000
Mahaweli Coconut Plantations	CSE: MCPL.N0000
Mahaweli Reach Hotels	CSE: MRH.N0000
Malwatte Valley Plantations	CSE: MAL.N0000
Marawila Resorts	CSE: MARA.N0000
Maskeliya Plantations	CSE: MASK.N0000
Melstacorp	CSE: MELS.N0000
Mercantile Investments and Finance	CSE: MERC.N0000
Mercantile Shipping Company	CSE: MSL.N0000
Merchant Bank of Sri Lanka & Finance	CSE: MBSL.N0000
Millennium Housing Developers	CSE: MHDL.N0000
Muller & Phipps (Ceylon)	CSE: MULL.N0000
Multi Finance	CSE: MFL.N0000
Myland Development	CSE: MDL.N0000

== N ==
Company name	Symbol
Namunukula Plantations	CSE: NAMU.N0000
Nation Lanka Finance	CSE: CSF.N0000
National Development Bank	CSE: NDB.N0000
Nations Trust Bank	CSE: NTB.N0000
Nawaloka Hospitals	CSE: NHL.N0000

== O ==
Company name	Symbol
Odel	CSE: ODEL.N0000
Office Equipment	CSE: OFEQ.N0000
On'ally Holdings	CSE: ONAL.N0000
Orient Finance	CSE: BFN.N0000
Overseas Realty (Ceylon)	CSE: OSEA.N0000

== P ==
Company name	Symbol
Palm Garden Hotels	CSE: PALM.N0000
Pan Asia Banking Corporation	CSE: PABC.N0000
Panasian Power	CSE: PAP.N0000
Paragon Ceylon	CSE: PARA.N0000
Pegasus Hotels of Ceylon	CSE: PEG.N0000
People's Insurance	CSE: PINS.N0000
People's Leasing & Finance	CSE: PLC.N0000
PGP Glass Ceylon	CSE: GLAS.N0000
PMF Finance	CSE: PMB.N0000
Prime Lands Residencies	CSE: PLR.N0000
Printcare	CSE: CARE.N0000

== R ==
Company name	Symbol
R I L Property	CSE: RIL.N0000
Radiant Gems International	CSE: RGEM.N0000
Raigam Wayamba Salterns	CSE: RWSL.N0000
Ramboda Falls	CSE: RFL.N0000
Regnis (Lanka)	CSE: REG.N0000
Renuka Agri Foods	CSE: RAL.N0000
Renuka City Hotels	CSE: RENU.N0000
Renuka Foods	CSE: COCO.N0000
Renuka Holdings	CSE: RHL.N0000
Renuka Hotels	CSE: RCH.N0000
Resus Energy	CSE: HPWR.N0000
Richard Pieris and Company	CSE: RICH.N0000
Richard Pieris Exports	CSE: REXP.N0000
Royal Ceramics Lanka	CSE: RCL.N0000
Royal Palms Beach Hotels	CSE: RPBH.N0000

== S ==
Company name	Symbol
Sampath Bank	CSE: SAMP.N0000
Samson International	CSE: SIL.N0000
Sanasa Development Bank	CSE: SDB.N0000
Sarvodaya Development Finance	CSE: SDF.N0000
Sathosa Motors	CSE: SMOT.N0000
Senkadagala Finance	CSE: SFCL.N0000
Serendib Engineering Group	CSE: IDL.N0000
Serendib Hotels	CSE: SHOT.N0000
Serendib Land	CSE: SLND.N0000
Seylan Bank	CSE: SEYB.N0000
Seylan Developments	CSE: CSD.N0000
Shaw Wallace Investments	CSE: KZOO.N0000
Sierra Cables	CSE: SIRA.N0000
Sigiriya Village Hotels	CSE: SIGV.N0000
Singer (Sri Lanka)	CSE: SINS.N0000
Singer Finance (Lanka)	CSE: SFIN.N0000
Singer Industries (Ceylon)	CSE: SINI.N0000
Singhe Hospitals	CSE: SINH.N0000
SMB Finance	CSE: SEMB.N0000
Softlogic Capital	CSE: SCAP.N0000
Softlogic Finance	CSE: CRL.N0000
Softlogic Holdings	CSE: SHL.N0000
Softlogic Life Insurance	CSE: AAIC.N0000
Sri Lanka Telecom	CSE: SLTL.N0000
Standard Capital	CSE: SING.N0000
Sunshine Holdings	CSE: SUN.N0000
Swadeshi Industrial Works	CSE: SWAD.N0000
Swisstek (Ceylon)	CSE: PARQ.N0000

== T ==
Company name	Symbol
TAL Lanka Hotels	CSE: TAJ.N0000
Talawakelle Tea Estates	CSE: TPL.N0000
Tangerine Beach Hotels	CSE: TANG.N0000
Tea Smallholder Factories	CSE: TSML.N0000
Teejay Lanka	CSE: TJL.N0000
Tess Agro	CSE: TESS.N0000
The Autodrome	CSE: AUTO.N0000
The Colombo Fort Land & Building	CSE: CFLB.N0000
The Fortress Resorts	CSE: RHTL.N0000
The Kandy Hotels Company (1938)	CSE: KHC.N0000
The Kingsbury	CSE: SERV.N0000
The Lanka Hospitals Corporation	CSE: LHCL.N0000
The Lighthouse Hotel	CSE: LHL.N0000
The Nuwara Eliya Hotels Company	CSE: NEH.N0000
Three Acre Farms	CSE: TAFL.N0000
Tokyo Cement Company (Lanka)	CSE: TKYO.N0000
Trans Asia Hotels	CSE: TRAN.N0000

== U ==
Company name	Symbol
UB Finance	CSE: UBF.N0000
Udapussellawa Plantations	CSE: UDPL.N0000
Union Assurance	CSE: UAL.N0000
Union Bank of Colombo	CSE: UBC.N0000
Union Chemicals Lanka	CSE: UCAR.N0000
Unisyst Engineering	CSE: ALUF.N0000
United Motors Lanka	CSE: UML.N0000

== V ==
Company name	Symbol
Vallibel Finance	CSE: VFIN.N0000
Vallibel One	CSE: VONE.N0000
Vallibel Power Erathna	CSE: VPEL.N0000
Vidullanka	CSE: VLL.N0000

== W ==
Company name	Symbol
Waskaduwa Beach Resort	CSE: CITW.N0000
Watawala Plantations	CSE: WATA.N0000
WindForce	CSE: WIND.N0000

== Y ==
Company name	Symbol
York Arcade Holdings	CSE: YORK.N0000
