= S&P Sri Lanka 20 Index =

Sri Lankan stock market index

S&P Sri Lanka 20/stocks
- Operator: S&P Dow Jones Indices
- Exchanges: CSE
- Constituents: 20
- Type: Large-cap
- Weighting method: Free-float capitalization-weighted
- Website: S&P SL20

The S&P SL20, or the Standard & Poor's Sri Lanka 20, is a stock market index, based on market capitalization, that follows the performance of 20 leading publicly traded companies listed in the Colombo Stock Exchange. The 20 companies that make up the index is determined by Standard & Poor's global index methodology, according to which the index's listing is reviewed each year. All S&P SL20 listed stocks are classified according to S&P and MSCI's Global Industry Classification Standard, thereby enabling better comparison of performance of Sri Lanka's largest and most liquid stocks with other global indices.

== History ==
With the conclusion of the thirty year conflict in 2009, Sri Lanka's Colombo Stock Exchange experienced unprecedented investor interest, with Bloomberg ranking Colombo Stock Exchange the best performing stock exchange for the year 2010. However, by June 2012, the investor confidence had eroded and an analysis of 78 stock exchanges conducted by Bespoke Investment Group identified Colombo Stock Exchange as the world’s fourth worst performing stock exchange to date during that year.

In identifying that the loss of confidence may be in part due to the inherent weaknesses in the Colombo Stock Exchange's indices, CSE partnered with Standard & Poor to develop S&P SL20 Index, as an equity benchmark, set according to global standards, that will help investors gauge the performance of the Sri Lankan equity market. The S&P SL20 Index was initiated on 18 June 2012 and was launched in Colombo on 26 June 2012. Further to the introduction of S&P SL20, on 1 January 2013, Milanka Price Index, which had till then tracked the performance of 25 best performing stocks in Sri Lanka, was discontinued.

In June 2013, Colombo Stock Exchange, in an attempt to further bridge the information asymmetry between investors and listed companies, partnered with Amba Research Lanka, to provide equities research on companies included in the S&P SL20 Index.

== List of Companies in the Current Index ==
This list is complete and up-to-date as of 22 June 2026.

Stock name
Access Engineering PLC
ACL Cables
Central Finance Company PLC
CIC Holdings
Commercial Bank of Ceylon PLC
DFCC Bank PLC
Dialog Axiata PLC
Hatton National Bank PLC
Hayleys PLC
Hemas Holdings PLC
John Keells Holdings PLC
Lanka IOC PLC
LOLC Holdings PLC
Melstacorp PLC
National Development Bank PLC
Nations Trust Bank PLC
Sampath Bank PLC
Singer Sri Lanka PLC
Sunshine Holdings PLC
Vallibel One Ltd
