= Renuka Holdings =

Conglomerate company in Sri Lanka

Renuka Holdings PLC
- Logo of Renuka Holdings
- Company type: Public
- Traded as: CSE: RHL.N0000
- ISIN: LK0355N00004
- Industry: Food; Consumer goods; Investment and Property
- Founded: 1979; 47 years ago
- Founder: Renuka Rajiyah
- Headquarters: Colombo, Sri Lanka
- Key people: Renuka Rajiyah (Chairperson); S. R. Rajiyah (Managing Director); S. V. Rajiyah (Managing Director)
- Brands: Richlife
- Revenue: ▲LKR17.089 billion (2023)
- Operating income: ▲LKR1.521 billion (2023)
- Net income: ▼LKR903 million (2023)
- Total assets: ▲LKR18.807 billion (2023)
- Total equity: ▲LKR13.234 billion (2023)
- Owners: Renuka Group Ltd (46.89%); S. R. Rajiyah and Renuka Rajiyah (20.06%); Sena Yaddehige (4.14%)
- Number of employees: 1,381 (2023)
- Subsidiaries: Renuka Agri Foods; Renuka Foods; Galle Face Capital Partners; Shaw Wallace Investments
- Website: www.renukagroup.com

Renuka Holdings PLC, also called Renuka Group, is a conglomerate company in Sri Lanka. Ceylonese businessman Alfred Thambiyah laid the foundations of the Renuka Group by acquiring the Crago Boat Dispatch Company in 1936 and establishing Renuka Hotel, named after his youngest daughter Indu Renuka in 1969. Indu Renuka Rajiyah founded Renuka Enterprises in 1975, and Renuka Holdings in 1979 marked the formal beginning of the group. Renuka Holdings went public in 2008 and following the listing on the Colombo Stock Exchange, the company pursued a growth strategy. Renuka Holdings is one of the LMD 100 companies in Sri Lanka and also one of the 20 largest conglomerates in Sri Lanka.

== History ==
Ceylonese businessman Alfred Thambiayah laid the foundations of the Renuka Group. Thambiyah went to business with Chittampalam A. Gardiner, and together they cofounded Ceylon Theatres Ltd in 1928. In 1936, Thambiyah acquired the Cargo Boat Dispatch Company, a shipping company operating in the Port of Colombo. Thambiyah was appointed chairman and managing director of Cargills (Ceylon) and Millers in 1960. In 1969, Renuka Hotel built in Colombo and named after Thambiyah's youngest daughter Indu Renuka. Indu Renuka Rajiyah founded Renuka Enterprises in 1975 and Renuka Holdings in 1979 marking the beginning of the Renuka Group. In 2008, Renuka Holdings was listed on the Colombo Stock Exchange.

Renuka Group acquired a stake of 76% in Richlife Dairies for LKR505 million in 2012. At the end of 2012, Renuka Holdings became one of the two companies in Sri Lanka to be included in Forbes Asia's "Best Under a Billion". Following its public listing, the company pursued an expansionist strategy. Renuka Holdings acquired Shaw Wallace Ceylon Ltd in 2012. Access to Shawa Wallace's distribution channel was the strategy behind the acquisition. After the acquisition, Shaw Wallace PLC was rebranded as Renuka Foods PLC in 2014. Renuka Holdings renamed its subsidiary Kalamazoo Systems PLC to Renuka Capital in 2017 and to Shaw Wallace Investments PLC in 2021.

== Operations ==
Renuka Holdings is one of the LMD 100 companies in Sri Lanka. LMD 100 ranks the top 100 listed companies in Sri Lanka by revenue annually. Renuka Holdings ranked 73rd in the 2020/21 edition while its indirect subsidiary Renuka Foods ranked 74th. Renuka Holdings is one of the 20 largest conglomerates in Sri Lanka. In 2019, Renuka Holdings' corporate brand value was worth LKR1,279 million. In 2020, Renuka Holdings entered into an agreement with Sanken Constructions to develop an LKR3.9 billion mixed development project near the Galle Face Green. The project is known as Galle Face Icon and it would be a 32-storey building with office spaces. The project is planned to operate under Renuka Holdings' subsidiary Galle Face Properties Ltd.

Subsidiaries of Renuka Group, Shaw Wallace & Hedges and Shaw Wallace Investments acquired a stake of 63.5% of Guardian Capital Partners PLC from Carson Cumberbatch in 2021. Guardian Capital Partners is a private equity firm and earlier it was planned to be sold to Singapore-based Gazelle Asset Management. After that arrangement fell through, Renuka Group's subsidiaries acquired the company for LKR533.27 million.

== See also ==
- List of companies listed on the Colombo Stock Exchange
