= List of Sri Lankan public corporations by market capitalisation =

This is a list of largest publicly traded companies on Colombo Stock Exchange by market capitalisation in Sri Lanka. Only the top 50 companies are listed below.

== List ==
These 50 companies alone account for about 75% of the total market capitalisation of the Colombo Stock Exchange. On January 4, 2021, total market capitalisation crossed three trillion rupees mark for the first time. Hayleys announced a stock split on January 21 of 2021 and it resulted in increasing market capitalization by over 100 billion rupees. All share price index surpassed 8000 points for the first as a result.

Company	Market capitalisation Rs. (mns)	Percentage of Total market cap.	Sector	Founded	Reference
Expolanka Holdings	276,132	7.74	Transportation	2003	
John Keells Holdings	188,002	5.27	Capital Goods	1979	
LOLC Finance	165,396	4.64	Diversified Financials	2001	
LOLC Holdings	157,648	4.42	Diversified Financials	1980	
Ceylon Tobacco Company	155,151	4.35	Food, Beverage and Tobacco	1932	
Sri Lanka Telecom	152,691	4.28	Communication Services	1974	
Distilleries Company of Sri Lanka	81,880	2.30	Food, Beverage and Tobacco	1989	
Dialog Axiata	80,827	2.27	Communication Services	1993	
Lanka IOC	73,480	2.06	Energy	2002	
Browns Investments	71,849	2.01	Food, Beverage and Tobacco	2008	
Commercial Bank of Ceylon	69,706	1.95	Banks	1969	
Cargills (Ceylon)	64,419	1.81	Food and Staples Retailing	1946	
Melstacorp	62,349	1.75	Food, Beverage and Tobacco	1998	
Sampath Bank	57,462	1.61	Banks	1986	
Lion Brewery (Ceylon)	55,960	1.57	Food, Beverage and Tobacco	1996	
Hatton National Bank	52,816	1.48	Banks	1970	
Carson Cumberbatch	51,650	1.45	Food, Beverage and Tobacco	1913	
Hayleys	50,850	1.43	Capital Goods	1952	
Aitken Spence	50,750	1.42	Capital Goods	1952	
Ceylinco Insurance	42,920	1.20	Insurance	1987	
Bukit Darah	42,712	1.20	Food, Beverage and Tobacco	1961	
Hemas Holdings	37,881	1.06	Capital Goods	1948	
Vallibel One	37,584	1.05	Capital Goods	2010	
C T Holdings	37,562	1.05	Food and Staples Retailing	1928	
Ceylon Cold Stores	36,685	1.03	Food, Beverage and Tobacco	1866	
Richard Pieris & Company	36,631	1.03	Capital Goods	1940	
Royal Ceramics Lanka	29,138	0.82	Capital Goods	1990	
LB Finance	28,312	0.79	Diversified Financials	1971	
Softlogic Life Insurance	26,925	0.76	Insurance	1999	
Senkadagala Finance	25,927	0.73	Diversified Financials	1968	
Asiri Hospital Holdings	25,822	0.72	Health Care Equipment and Services	1980	
John Keells Hotels	24,026	0.67	Consumer Services	1979	
Ceylon Beverage Holdings	23,800	0.67	Food, Beverage and Tobacco	1910	
Hunas Holdings	22,781	0.64	Consumer Services	1989	
WindForce	22,423	0.63	Independent Power Producers and Energy Traders	2010	
The Lanka Hospitals Corporation	22,351	0.63	Health Care Equipment and Services	1997	
Teejay Lanka	22,147	0.62	Consumer Durables and Apparel	2000	
Brown and Company	21,422	0.60	Capital Goods	1892	
Dilmah Ceylon Tea Company	20,986	0.59	Food, Beverage and Tobacco	1981	
Sunshine Holdings	20,909	0.59	Food, Beverage and Tobacco	1973	
Chevron Lubricants Lanka	19,872	0.56	Materials	1992	
Aitken Spence Hotel Holdings	19,807	0.56	Consumer Services	1978	
PGP Glass Ceylon	18,907	0.53	Materials	1956	
Union Assurance	18,032	0.51	Insurance	1987	
CIC Holdings	17,904	0.50	Materials	1964	
Overseas Realty (Ceylon)	17,900	0.50	Real estate	1980	
Nations Trust Bank	17,542	0.49	Banks	1999	
National Development Bank	17,337	0.49	Banks	1979	
DFCC Bank	16,878	0.47	Banks	1955	
Haycarb	16,580	0.46	Materials	1973	

Source: Colombo Stock Exchange, 20 May 2023

== See also ==
- List of public corporations by market capitalization
