= Amana Takaful Insurance =

Insurance company in Sri Lanka

Amana Takaful PLC, doing business as Amana Takaful Insurance, is a Sri Lankan insurance company which follows the principles of Islam and it is listed in the Colombo Stock Exchange. It provides life insurance and different types of general insurance solutions such as motor vehicle insurance, health insurance, theft and burglary insurance, travel insurance, and marine insurance. Amana Takaful operates as the full-fledged Takaful provider in Sri Lanka and the Maldives.

== Corporate history ==
The company began its operations on 25 September 1999. Amana Takaful introduced the Takaful insurance mechanism in Sri Lanka and is the only Takaful business entity to operate in Sri Lanka. In 2017, the company set up insurance safety nets, "TukTuk Full" and "Smart Rider Cover" especially catering to the requirements of the three-wheeler and motorcycle insurance policyholders. The company also gained ISO 9001:2008 Quality Management System certification for the conduct of its General and Family (Life) Takaful businesses in 2017. In 2021, the company launched a new segment of motor insurance titled "Total Drive Prestige" by assigning it as a premier insurance cover at competitive market rates, specifically with an attribute of a 100% claim pay-off.

In July 2021, M. Zulficar Ghouse was appointed as the chairman of Amana Takaful, as he subsequently succeeded the founder of Amana Group, Osman Kassim to the position. Osman Kassim announced his retirement in early 2021, leaving a leadership vacuum at Amana Takaful which was eventually filled by Ghouse. In July 2022, Amana Takaful collaborated with Postgraduate Institute of Management to carry out a project proposal pertaining to the Leadership Excellence Programme with the intention of grooming the employees considering the foreseeable future of the organization as a part of the company's succession plan objectives.

In 2023, Amana Takaful reached a bancassurance partnership deal with Pan Asia Bank as a part of cross-selling strategies of both the companies to cater to their respective customer bases. The bancassurance partnership meant that the customers of Pan Asia Bank could obtain the insurance solutions offered by Amana Takaful and the customers of Amana Takaful could obtain the banking services of Pan Asia Bank.

In September 2023, Amana Takaful signed up a Memorandum of Understanding with CBC Finance Limited to foster cross-selling strategies of both the companies catering to their customer base. In March 2024, Siva Karthigun joined the Amana Takaful Insurance and was appointed as its chief operating officer. In April 2024, in just over a month, Siva Karthigun was promoted to the position of Chief Operating Officer of the organization after previously serving in as the chief operating officer.

In July 2024, Amana Takaful was conferred with the Mobile App of the Year from Sri Lanka at the 2024 edition of the Insurance Asia Awards. On 25 September 2024, the company marked its 25th anniversary and the 25th anniversary events were proceeded at the Hotel Mandarina.

== See also ==
- List of companies listed on the Colombo Stock Exchange
