= Access Engineering =

Sri Lankan civil engineering construction company

Access Engineering PLC
- Logo of Access Engineering
- Type: Public
- Traded as: CSE: AEL.N0000
- ISIN: LK0409N00009
- Industry: Construction; Engineering
- Founded: July 31, 2001; 24 years ago
- Founder: Sumal Perera
- Headquarters: Colombo, Sri Lanka
- Key people: Sumal Perera (Chairman); Christopher Joshua (Executive Vice Chairman); Rohana Fernando (Managing Director)
- Revenue: ▼LKR20.565 billion (2023)
- Operating income: ▲LKR7.834 billion (2023)
- Net income: ▼LKR2.436 billion (2023)
- Total assets: ▼LKR79.941 billion (2023)
- Total equity: ▲LKR31.972 billion (2023)
- Owners: Sumal Perera (25.00%); Christopher Joshua (10.01%); Ramani Joshua (7.00%)
- Number of employees: 1,094 (2023)
- Subsidiaries: Sathosa Motors PLC (84.42%)
- Website: accessengsl.com

Access Engineering PLC is a Sri Lankan civil engineering company engaged in the construction industry and supply of construction-related services and materials as well as mechanical engineering, real estate, renewable energy, automobile trading, and radiopharmaceutical production. The company is one of the constituents of the S&P Sri Lanka 20 Index. The company was founded in 2001, and in 2012 was listed on the Colombo Stock Exchange. In 2019, for the third consecutive year, the company was named amongst the ten "Best Corporate Citizens in the Country" by the Ceylon Chamber of Commerce. Currently, the company is constructing the largest condominium in Sri Lanka, with 1,068 units. Following the news that the Cabinet of Sri Lanka had granted the LKR 9.34 billion housing project in Elliot Road, Borella, the company's share price rose by five-fold.

== History ==
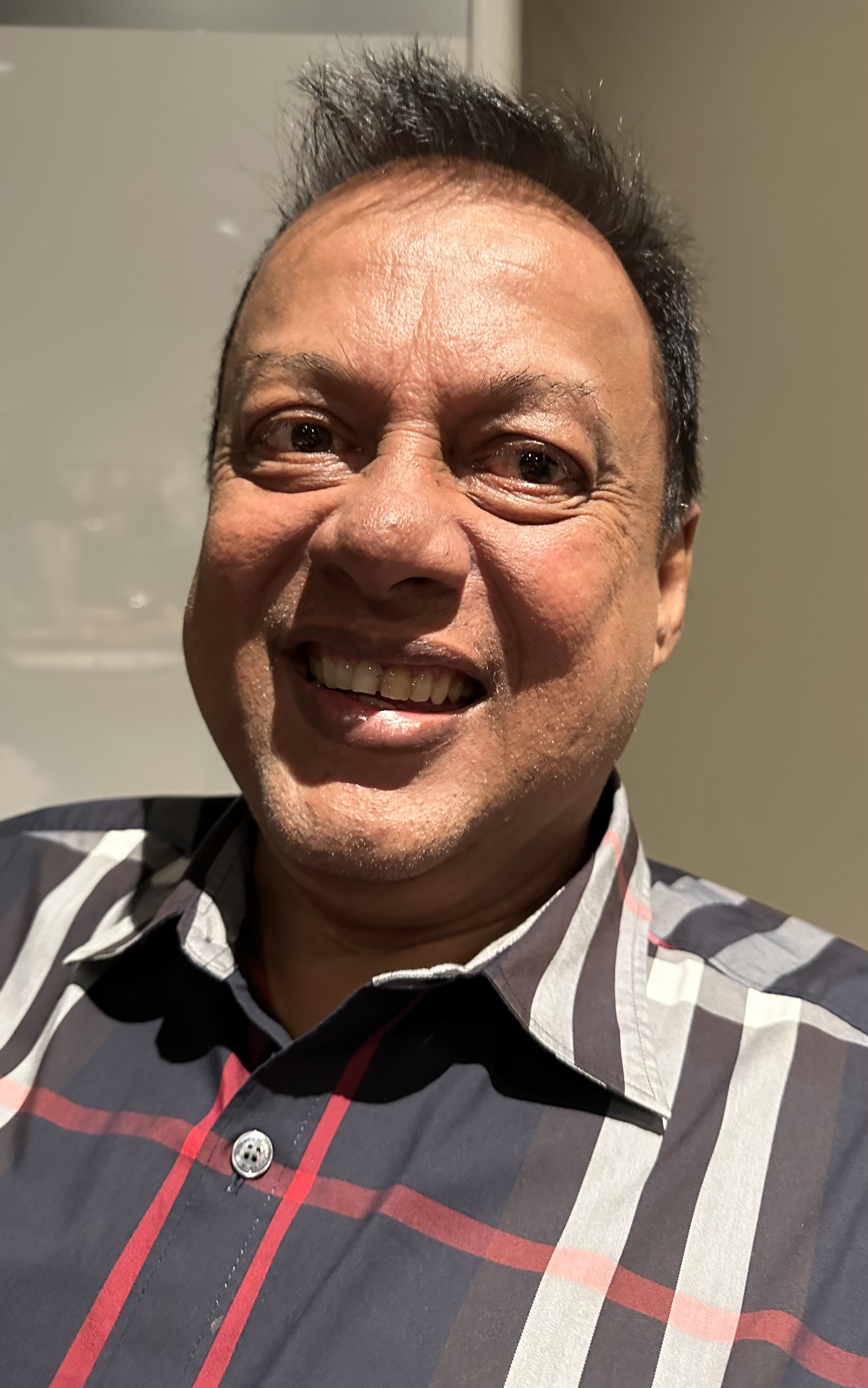
Sumal Perera, Founder, Access Engineering PLC

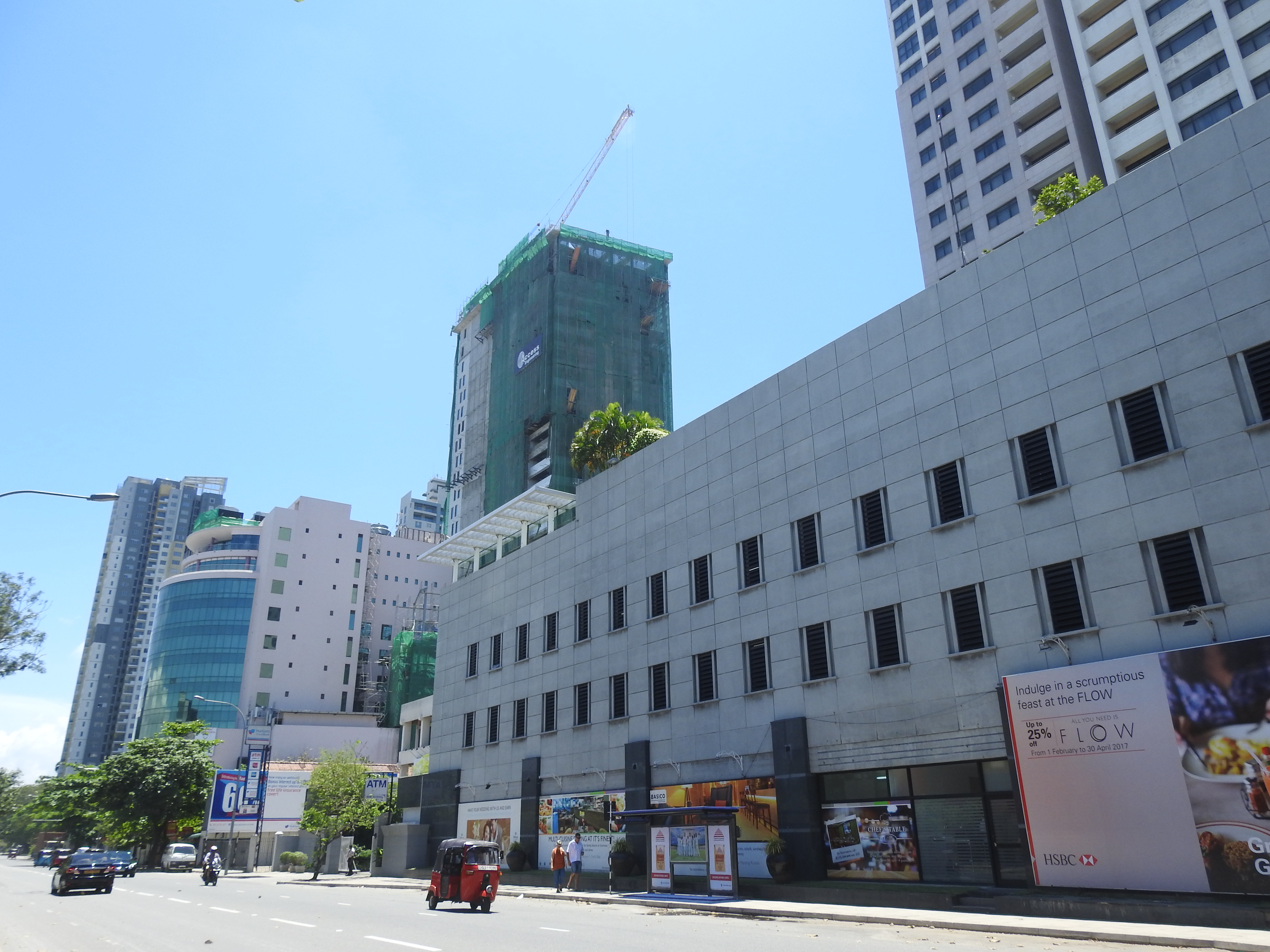
Access Tower (left) and the construction site of Access Tower II (middle), in 2017

In 2001, Access Engineering Limited was founded by three shareholders, Sumal Perera, Christopher Joshua and Ranjan Gomez. In 2008, Access Realties Limited, the owner of the Access Tower in Union Place, Colombo became a subsidiary of the company. The company issued 180 million ordinary shares and raised LKR 4.5 billion in 2011. In the same year, Access Engineering became the first Sri Lankan construction company to take part in the United Nations Global Compact. The company was listed on the Colombo Stock Exchange in 2012 and offered 20 million shares in the Initial public offering and raised LKR 500 million. The company bought 60% of the shares of Sathosa Motors PLC in the same year. In 2014, the company acquired 100% ownership of Access Realties II Limited and in 2019 for the third consecutive year the company was named amongst the ten "Best Corporate Citizens in the Country" by the Ceylon Chamber of Commerce. In 2019, Access Engineering acquired 100% of the issued shares of WUS Logistics (Pvt) Ltd. for LKR 925 million.

== Operations ==
The company is currently constructing Marina Square, the largest condominium in Sri Lanka with 1,068 units and a 242-unit apartment complex in Capital Heights in Rajagiriya is nearing completion. The company expanded its asphalt manufacturing operations with the building of its seventh plant in Kekirawa. Access Engineering is one of the largest asphalt concrete producers in Sri Lanka currently. The company recorded LKR 691 million profit for the third quarter of the financial year of 2020 and it is a 141% year-on-year growth. During the quarter the company executed a number of projects including Thambapavani Wind Farm, Bloemendal housing project in Colombo, a building project for Sri Lanka Institute of Nanotechnology, construction of Central Expressway and Nittambuwa-Pasyala Road project.

The Cabinet of Sri Lanka gave its approval to grant the 400-units Elliot Place housing project in Borella for LKR 9.34 billion to Access Engineering. Following the news, the company's share price increased five-fold in Colombo Stock Exchange. The company acquired 50% of shares in Lanka AAC Ltd, a lightweight brick manufacturer for LKR 131 million at the start of 2021. Lanka AAC Ltd. manufactures autoclaved aerated concrete used in the construction industry. Due to the boom in public investment, the company stands to gain in the next five years.

== See also ==
- List of companies listed on the Colombo Stock Exchange
- List of Sri Lankan public corporations by market capitalisation
