= Capital Alliance =

Sri Lankan financial company

Coordinates: 6°55′09.4″N 79°51′02.8″E

Capital Alliance PLC
- Logo of Capital Alliance
- Formerly: Capital Asia Markets Ltd (2000-2002); Capital Alliance Limited (2002-2021)
- Company type: Public
- Traded as: CSE: CALT.N0000
- ISIN: LK0477N00006
- Industry: Financial services
- Founded: August 10, 2000; 25 years ago
- Headquarters: Colombo, Sri Lanka
- Key people: D. A. De Zoysa (Chairman); W. A. T. Fernando (CEO)
- Revenue: ▲LKR4.720 billion (2023)
- Operating income: ▲LKR4.852 billion (2023)
- Net income: ▲LKR2.827 billion (2023)
- Total assets: ▲LKR38.041 billion (2023)
- Total equity: ▲LKR32.551 billion (2023)
- Parent: Capital Alliance Holdings Ltd (79.41%)
- Website: cal.lk

Capital Alliance PLC, abbreviated as CALT, is a primary dealer in Sri Lanka. The company is a subsidiary of Capital Alliance Holdings Ltd. Capital Alliance Holdings Group is an investment bank. The company was incorporated in 2000 as Capital Asia Markets Ltd, a subsidiary of Asia Capital Ltd. The company changed its name to Capital Alliance Limited two years later. In 2003, Capital Alliance obtained a primary dealer licence from the Central Bank of Sri Lanka. Following an initial public offering, the company was listed on the Colombo Stock Exchange in December 2021. Capital Alliance is ranked among the 100 most valuable brands in Sri Lanka.

== History ==
The company was incorporated in 2000 as Capital Asia Markets Ltd, a subsidiary of Asia Capital Ltd. The company started with an LKR21 million share capital, and Ajith Fernando was the managing director. The company changed its name to Capital Alliance Limited in 2002 after a change in ownership. In 2003, Capital Alliance obtained a primary dealer license from the Central Bank of Sri Lanka. In the wake of the government of Sri Lanka's gearing up to open new casinos in 2013, Capital Alliance cautioned that casinos alone would not boost tourism in Sri Lanka. The company also highlighted the fact of the government's failure to set up a gaming regulatory authority. Capital Alliance won four awards at the 2015 Global Banking & Finance Awards, including the best investment bank in Sri Lanka award.

In 2016, Capital Alliance acted as the sell side advisor in the deal of Hayleys acquiring 75% of the stake in Fentons. The transaction was valued at LKR960 million. Kasturi Chellaraja Wilson was appointed to the board of directors of the company in 2018. At the time of her appointment, she was acting as the managing director of Hemas Holdings. Capital Alliance introduced its new logo in 2020. With the launch of the new logo, the company also emphasised its new strategy of serving family-owned businesses. The company entered the Bangladesh market in 2021 with an investment agreement with BetaOne Investments Ltd. BetaOne Investments Ltd is a merchant bank in Bangladesh. Capital Alliance announced its initial public offering (IPO) in November 2021. The IPO opened on 25 November 2021 and was oversubscribed on its opening day itself. The company offered a 12.5% stake in the company which was valued at LKR412 million. Following the IPO, the shares of the company debuted on the Colombo Stock Exchange on 15 December 2021.

== Operations ==
Capital Alliance is one of the five non-bank primary dealer companies in the country. Capital Alliance brand is one of the 100 most valuable brands in the country. Brand name CAL ranked 95th in Brand Finance rankings in 2023. The company was ranked 88th in 2022. Capital Alliance entered into the LMD 100 second board rankings for the first time in 2023, owing to the fact of increasing its earnings to LKR4.720 billion in 2023 compared to LKR508 million earnings in 2022. LMD 100 is an annual ranking of listed companies by revenue.

=== Capital Alliance Holdings Group ===
Capital Alliance Holdings Ltd is the parent of the company. The major shareholders of Capital Alliance Holdings in 2011 were Jetwing Travels (36.73%), Ashthi Holdings (36.41%), W. A. T. Fernando (13.21%), and R. J. Arasaratnam (11.76%). Capital Alliance Finance PLC (now known as Dialog Finance PLC) and Ceylon Tea Brokers PLC were subsidiaries of the Capital Alliance Group. Cargills Bank acquired Capital Alliance Finance in 2014. Cargills Bank bought 70% of shares in the company for a consideration of LKR420 million.

== See also ==
- List of companies listed on the Colombo Stock Exchange
