= Ajit Jayaratne =

Deshabandhu Ajit Jayaratne is the former chairman of the Colombo Stock Exchange, the Finance Commission of Sri Lanka and of the Ceylon Chamber of Commerce.

== Corporate experience ==
Ajit Jayaratne currently serves as the chairman of KIA Motors and as a Singer (Sri Lanka), Colombo Fort Land and Building PLC, Kotagala Plantations PLC, C.W. Mackie PLC, and ACL Cables PLC. He has previously held positions as a director of the Ceylon Petroleum Corporation, DFCC Bank, Associated Electrical Corporation Ltd, Delmege Forsyth Co., and People's Bank. Additionally, he has served as the former chairman of Forbes and Walkers Ltd. and Apollo Hospitals.

Ajit Jayaratne recently launched Innovest Investments (Pvt) Ltd, a boutique investment management company. Jayaratne, a graduate in Economics from the University of Southampton, is a Chartered Accountant by profession. He previously served as the High Commissioner to Singapore and is a fellow of both the Institute of Chartered Accountants, UK, and Sri Lanka.
