= Osman Kassim =

Sri Lankan entrepreneur

- Born: 1953 (age 72–73)
- Education: Royal College, Colombo
- Alma mater: Staffordshire University
- Occupations: entrepreneur, banker

Osman Kassim (born 1953) is a Sri Lankan entrepreneur and philanthropist. He is regarded as the prominent pioneer of Islamic finance in Sri Lanka. He was also the founder chairman of Amana Bank PLC.

== Career ==
Osman Kassim introduced Islamic Banking concept in Sri Lanka and was instrumental in pioneering the concept of Islamic finance in Sri Lanka. He has remarkable experience of over four decades of senior management experience in Islamic banking and Islamic Takaful insurance.

He has travelled to many places around the world and is fully conversant with technical terms and conditions with regards to Islamic Banking practices as well as the methodologies in most countries where Islamic Banking is available.

He has formerly served as the chairman of the Expolanka Group. He has also held chairman posts of Vidullanka PLC, Aberdeen Holdings (Pvt) Ltd, Al-Hassan Foundation and Rockfam (Pvt) Ltd. He also holds directorship in Amana Takaful Life PLC and Amana Takaful (Maldives) PLC.

He also served in as one of the members of Board of Directors of the Maldives Islamic Bank PLC from 2017 until July 2020. He was also duly recognized for his conduct, achievements and utmost professionalism as a global entrepreneur and as a visionary educationist. He was conferred with an Honorary Doctorate by Staffordshire University in UK.

LMD magazine recognized his contributions in the field of Islamic finance by rating him among the "A-List of the Captains of Business" at the dawn of the decade. The magazine also acknowledged his services which uplifted the growth of Sri Lanka in economic perspective. He also appeared in the front side page cover of LMD magazine.
