= SDB bank =

Sri Lankan specialized bank

SANASA Development Bank PLC
- Logo of SDB bank
- Trade name: SDB bank
- Company type: Public
- Traded as: CSE: SDB.N0000
- ISIN: LK0412N00003
- Industry: Banking
- Founded: August 6, 1997; 28 years ago
- Headquarters: Kirulapone, Colombo, Sri Lanka
- Number of locations: 94 branches (2023)
- Key people: Dinithi Ratnayake (Chairperson); Kapila Ariyaratne (CEO)
- Revenue: ▲LKR30.793 billion (2023)
- Operating income: ▲LKR7.534 billion (2023)
- Net income: ▲LKR467 million (2023)
- Total assets: ▼LKR156.957 billion (2023)
- Total equity: ▲LKR14.266 billion (2023)
- Owners: ICONIC Property Twenty Three (Pvt) Ltd (15.00%); Senthilverl Holdings (12.01%); FMO (10.96%)
- Number of employees: 1,295 (2023)
- Subsidiaries: Payment Services (Private) Limited
- Rating: BB+(lka) (Fitch); (SL)BBB (ICRA Lanka)
- Website: sdb.lk

SANASA Development Bank PLC, commonly called SDB bank, is a Sri Lankan bank serving the co-operative sector, founded in 1997. This bank has opened 94 branches in Sri Lanka. In 1997 SDB Bank was granted the status of Licensed Specialized Bank by the Central Bank of Sri Lanka.

== Subsidiaries ==
- Sdbl North East Construction Company Pvt Ltd
- Sanasa Development Bank Ltd
- Asset Management Arm
