= ACL Cables =

Cable manufacturing company in Sri Lanka

ACL Cables PLC
- Current logo was introduced in 2015
- Type: Public
- Traded as: CSE: ACL.N0000
- ISIN: LK0011N00003
- Industry: Building materials
- Founded: 1962; 64 years ago
- Headquarters: Colombo, Sri Lanka
- Key people: U. G. Madanayake (Chairman); Suren Madanayake (Managing Director); Hemaka Amarasuriya (Director); Ajit Jayaratne (Director)
- Revenue: ▼LKR30.146 billion (2023)
- Operating income: ▲LKR9.079 billion (2023)
- Net income: ▲LKR7.013 billion (2023)
- Total assets: ▲LKR36.111 billion (2023)
- Total equity: ▲LKR27.458 billion (2023)
- Owners: U. G. Madanayake (38.15%); Suren Madanayake (22.21%); Employees' Provident Fund (4.93%)
- Number of employees: 1,641 (2023)
- Subsidiaries: See text
- Website: www.acl.lk

ACL Cables PLC is a cable manufacturing company in Sri Lanka. It manufactures and sells power cables, conductors, armoured cables and telephone cables. The company was established in 1962 as Associated Cables, a subsidiary of Associated Motorways. It was publicly quoted in 1976. In 1980, the company moved out of the Associated Motorways Group and was renamed ACL Cables in 1990. ACL Cables is one of the LMD 100 companies in Sri Lanka.

== History ==
In 1962, Associated Cables Ltd was incorporated as a subsidiary of Associated Motorways (AMW). Manufacturing of electric cables commenced in the following year in the AMW industrial park in Kalutara. Associated Cables was listed on the Colombo Stock Exchange in 1976. The company moved out of the Associated Motorways Group in 1980 and was renamed ACL Cables to establish an independent identity from Associated Motorways in 1990. The company started manufacturing armoured cables in 1986. ACL Cables began a technical collaboration with Nokia Cables in 1988. In 1995, the company started exporting to Bangladesh and the Maldives.

ACL Cables acquired Kelani Cables in 1999. The acquisition raised monopolistic concerns by the small players in the market. Even though the acquisition fueled speculations of triggering anti-monopoly legislation, since cables were not one of the 46 items that have been gazetted which cannot be monopolised, the Fair Trading Commission did not interfere in the matter. A consortium of companies consisting of ACL Cables, National Development Bank and Trydan Partners acquired Hemas Power from Hemas Holdings. ACL Cables introduced its new logo in 2015. The company acquired 51% of Cable Solutions (Pvt) Ltd for LKR480.7 million in 2019.

== Operations ==
ACL Cables was ranked the most valuable building material and 37th overall brand in Sri Lanka in 2022 by Brand Finance. The company controls 70% of the market share of the cable market. ICRA Lanka upgraded its credit rating of ACL Cables to [SL]AA- from [SL]A+ in January 2022. The credit outlook is adjudged as Stable. The company's financial position and market share are cited as the rationale for the rating. ACL Cables' main export markets are India, Australia, Maldives, Bangladesh and Africa.

With the shortage of foreign exchange reserves due to the Sri Lankan economic crisis, the company faced difficulties in importing raw materials. ACL ceiling fans received Sri Lanka Standard Institute's certification for energy efficiency and safety features. The company moved to the ceiling fans market in 2016. Percy Abeysekera, the superfan of the Sri Lanka national cricket team is an employee of the company. Abeysekera joined the company in 1962 as a factory foreman and rose to a factory manager position during his career.

=== Subsidiaries ===
Subsidiary	Group holding
Kelani Cables PLC	79.30%
ACL Plastics PLC	65.20%
Ceylon Bulbs & Electricals Ltd	95.30%
Lanka Olex Cables (Pvt) Ltd	100%
ACL Kelani Magnet Wire (Pvt) Ltd	93.79%
ACL Polymers (Pvt) Ltd	65.20%
ACL Metals & Alloys (Pvt) Ltd	100%
Ceylon Copper (Pvt) Ltd	100%
ACL Electric (Pvt) Ltd	100%
Cable Solutions (Pvt) Ltd	51%
RESUS Energy PLC	32.53%

Source: Annual Report, 2020/21

== See also ==
- List of companies listed on the Colombo Stock Exchange
