= Singer (Sri Lanka) =

Sri Lankan holding company

Singer (Sri Lanka) PLC
- Logo of Singer (Sri Lanka) PLC
- Company type: Public
- Traded as: CSE: SINS.N0000
- ISIN: LK0156N00006
- Industry: Retailing; Holding company
- Founded: 1974; 52 years ago
- Headquarters: Colombo, Sri Lanka
- Key people: Mohan Pandithage (Chairman); Mahesh Wijewardene (Chief Executive Officer)
- Revenue: ▼LKR54.767 billion (2023)
- Operating income: ▼LKR6.688 billion (2023)
- Net income: ▼LKR96 million (2023)
- Total assets: ▼LKR78.798 billion (2023)
- Total equity: ▼LKR12.089 billion (2023)
- Number of employees: ▼2,986 (2023)
- Parent: Hayleys (69.55%)
- Subsidiaries: See text
- Website: singersl.com

Singer (Sri Lanka) PLC is a Sri Lankan holding company engaged in retailing and wholesale marketing home appliances and furniture. The company is also taking part in financial services and manufacturing businesses. The company is listed on the Colombo Stock Exchange since 1981 and in 2017, the Sri Lankan conglomerate, Hayleys acquired the majority of the shares. Singer (Sri Lanka) is ranked 17th in the LMD 100, an annual list of listed companies in Sri Lanka by revenue, in 2020/21 edition. Brand Finance ranked the company 15th most valuable brand in Sri Lanka in its annual list of top 100 brands.

== History ==
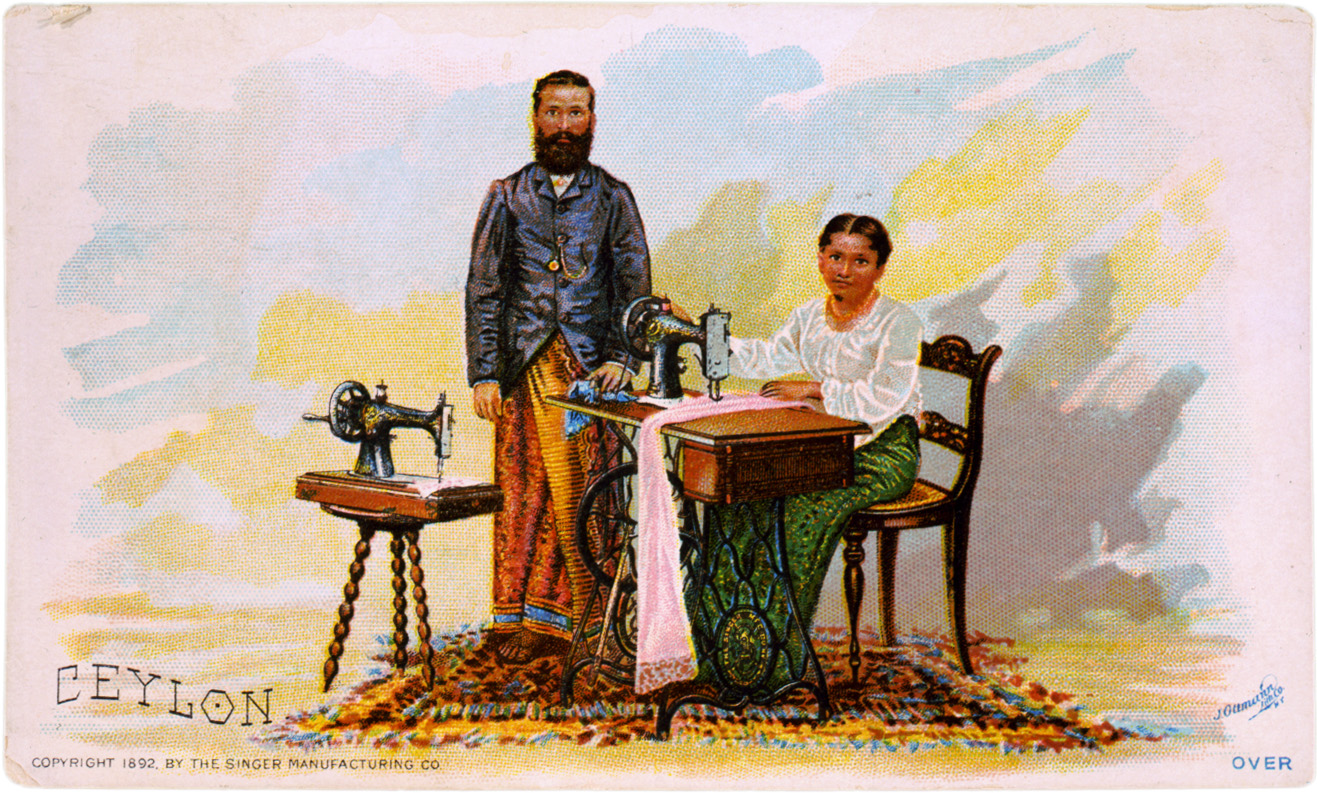
A Ceylonese Singer sewing machine advertisement card from 1892

The Singer Corporation entered the Sri Lankan market in 1877 with the sale of sewing machines. The company was incorporated as a limited liability company in 1974 and became a quoted company in the Colombo Stock Exchange in 1981. In 1988, the company started manufacturing refrigerators through its subsidiary, Regnis Lanka. The first Singer Mega shop opened in 1998 and in 2000 the company acquired the local refrigerator manufacturing brand, Sisil. In 2011, the company entered into the sale of smartphone business and the 400th Singer showroom was opened in 2013. In 2017, Hayleys acquired a controlling stake in the company and thus became the parent company of Singer (Sri Lanka). The value of the acquisition stood at LKR10.9 billion, making it one of the largest acquisitions for a listed company in Sri Lanka.

== Operations ==
The company controls the subsidiaries of Singer Finance (Lanka), Singer Industries (Ceylon), Regnis Lanka, Realty (Lanka) Ltd, Singer Digital Media (Pvt) Ltd, and Singer Business School (Pvt) Ltd. Singer (Sri Lanka) was credit rated as A+(lka) by Fitch Ratings in April 2022. In 2020, Singer (Sri Lanka) emerged as the market-leading seller for Dell laptops in Sri Lanka. Due to the COVID-19 pandemic, increased incidences of remote work and distance education arrangements, the demand for consumer electronics rose and the company posted LKR16.7 billion in sales in the second quarter of 2020. The company announced a 3-for-1 stock split in 2021. Also in 2021, the company won the People's Brand of the Year for the consecutive 15th time at the SLIM-Nielsen Awards. The company also reclaimed the award for Youth Choice Brand of the Year after three years.

=== Subsidiaries ===
Subsidiary	Holding	Value LKR (mns)	Activity
Singer Finance (Lanka) PLC	79.93%	1,428	Financial services
Singer Industries (Ceylon) PLC	87.72%	692	Manufacturing, assembling sewing machines
Regnis (Lanka) PLC	58.29%	722	Manufacturing refrigerators
Singer Digital Media (Private) Limited	100%	5	Merged with the parent in January 2023
Singer Business School (Private) Limited	100%	10	Educational services
Reality Lanka Limited	92.24%	110	Property investment
Domus Lanka (Private) Limited	100%		Dormant

Source: Annual Report, 2022/23 (pp. 24, 187)

== See also ==
- List of companies listed on the Colombo Stock Exchange
- List of Sri Lankan public corporations by market capitalisation
