= Hela Apparel Holdings =

Sri Lankan apparel holding company

- Logo of Hela Apparel Holdings
- Formerly: Hela Apparel Holdings (Pvt) Ltd
- Type: Public
- Traded as: CSE: HELA.N0000; S&P Sri Lanka 20 Index component
- ISIN: LK0484N00002
- Industry: Holding Company; Apparel
- Founded: October 11, 2018; 7 years ago
- Fate: Filed for court-ordered winding up (August 2026)
- Headquarters: Colombo, Sri Lanka
- Key people: A. R. Rasiah (Chairman); P. L. D. Jinadasa (CEO)
- Revenue: ▲LKR95,303 million (2023)
- Operating income: ▼LKR630 million (2023)
- Net income: ▼LKR(3,332) million (2023)
- Total assets: ▲LKR55,698 million (2023)
- Total equity: ▼LKR11,458 million (2023)
- Owners: Lesing Hela Limited (46.89%); Tars Investments Lanka Pvt Ltd (17.99%); P. L. D. Jinadasa (10.48%)
- Number of employees: ▼17,800 (2023)
- Subsidiaries: Hela Clothing Pvt Ltd
- Website: www.helaclothing.com

Hela Apparel Holdings PLC, branded as Hela Clothing, was a holding company in Sri Lanka that was engaged in the apparel industry. The company supplied a number of brands such as Tommy Hilfiger, Calvin Klein, and Michael Kors. Hela Apparel Holdings operated four design centres in Sri Lanka, the United States, France and the United Kingdom. The company had eleven manufacturing plants, seven in Sri Lanka, and two each in Ethiopia and Kenya. It was a constituent of the S&P Sri Lanka 20 Index from June 2022. In August 2026, the company filed for a court-ordered winding up after its board concluded that it and its main subsidiaries were unable to pay their debts amid continuing liquidity constraints.

== History ==
Hela Clothing (Pvt) Ltd was incorporated in 1991. The Fielding Group was the initial owner of the company. British entrepreneur Dominic McVey invested in Hela Clothing in 2013. Sri Lankan business executive Dian Gomes was hired by McVey to lead the company. By 2017, the company was incurring sizeable overheads and facing cash flow constraints. The company was forced to expand into Ethiopia and Kenya. Gomes wanted to raise capital by either infusing capital from existing shareholders or diluting 30% of ownership to raise US$10 million from outside investors. Gomes's relationship with McVey was strained when Gomes wanted to suspend the annual management fee of US$1 million to the investment firm Ellestone Apparel, a company headed by McVey. In 2019, Gomes resigned from the company and McVey divested much of his stake. An investor consortium infused US$10 million into the company's capital in November 2018.

Hela Clothing appointed A. R. Rasiah as the new chairman of the company in December 2018. Hela Apparel Holdings (Pvt) Ltd was founded in 2018 and was listed on the Colombo Stock Exchange in 2022 through an initial public offering (IPO). The IPO offered 20% of the company and was intended to raise LKR4 billion. It was the largest issue on the exchange since 2011. The IPO was oversubscribed 5.4 times and received applications worth LKR21.8 billion.

=== Initial Public Offering ===
The company received a credit rating of AA(lka) with a stable outlook from Fitch Ratings in March 2022. Hela Apparel Holdings expanded into Egypt by opening its twelfth plant in the country, chosen for its proximity to Europe and North America, which shortened shipping times. The company reported revenue of LKR56 billion for the 2021/22 financial year, a 75% increase on the previous year. In 2022, the company received ISO 14064-1:2018 certification from the Sustainable Future Group for a framework to quantify and report its greenhouse gas emissions.

=== Financial difficulties and winding up ===
Hela Apparel's audited financial statements for the year ended 31 March 2025 received a disclaimer of opinion from its auditors, and in December 2025 its shares were placed on the Colombo Stock Exchange's watch list. For the nine months ended 31 December 2025, group revenue fell by about 29% to LKR43.95 billion from LKR61.55 billion a year earlier, and the group reported a loss of LKR7.57 billion. By the end of 2025 the group had negative total equity of about LKR18.8 billion and accumulated losses of about LKR31.6 billion.

The company held initial discussions with financial institutions over a proposed debt restructuring of its operating subsidiaries but did not secure the necessary approvals. In June 2026, the Securities and Exchange Commission of Sri Lanka declined a request to further defer the suspension of trading in the company's securities. In the months before its closure, Hela sought to raise cash by divesting assets, including its stake in the UK-based Focus Brands Limited; the operation of several of its manufacturing plants in Sri Lanka was taken over by Emerald Clothing (Pvt) Ltd.

On 4 August 2026, the board of directors resolved to seek a court-ordered winding up of Hela Apparel Holdings and its subsidiaries Hela Clothing (Private) Limited and Foundation Garments (Private) Limited, concluding that the group was unable to pay its debts and could not continue in business. The company said the decision was taken only after all restructuring and funding alternatives had been exhausted, rejected or found no longer commercially viable. Applications for winding up under the Companies Act No. 7 of 2007 were filed with the Commercial High Court of the Western Province in Colombo on 5 August 2026, and the move was disclosed to the Colombo Stock Exchange the same day. At that time the group operated ten manufacturing sites across four countries and employed more than 17,000 people.

== See also ==
- List of companies listed on the Colombo Stock Exchange
