= Sri Lanka Institute of Nanotechnology =

Research institute in Homagama, Sri Lanka

- Established: 2008; 18 years ago
- Focus: Nanotechnology and allied research
- Chair: Thilan Wijesinghe
- Staff: 100+
- Key people: Thushara Vajira Perera (Chief Executive Officer)
- Subsidiaries: SLINTEC Analytical Hub
- Owner: Public–private partnership between: The Government of Sri Lanka; Brandix; Browns & Company PLC; Dialog; Hayleys PLC; Lankem Ceylon PLC; Michelin Lanka (Pvt) Ltd.; LOLC Holdings; MAS Holdings
- Location: Nanotechnology & Science Park, Mahenwatta, Pitipana, Homagama 10206, Sri Lanka
- Coordinates: 6.826241°N 80.038178°E
- Interactive map of Sri Lanka Institute of Nanotechnology
- Website: slintec.lk

The Sri Lanka Institute of Nanotechnology (Sinhala: ශ්‍රී ලංකා නිනිති තාක්ෂණ ආයතනය; Tamil: இலங்கை நனோ தொழில்நுட்ப நிறுவனம்) (abbreviated and commonly known as SLINTEC) is a Sri Lankan research institute specialising in the field of nanotechnology. It was incorporated in 2008 as a public-private partnership between the Government of Sri Lanka and five private companies, and is notable for being the first public-private research institute in the country.

In 2017, it was accredited as a degree-awarding institution by the Ministry of Higher Education and Highways, leading to the establishment of the SLINTEC Academy.

== Background ==
The idea of a national science policy for Sri Lanka was first discussed in the 1980s, although the matter did not move forward in any concrete way for several decades due to the more pressing economic and budgetary needs of the civil war on successive administrations. Nevertheless, a presidential taskforce was appointed in 1991 to examine possible policy actions to be taken in the field of the sciences. Further advancements came some years later, when the Science and Technology Act No. 11 of 1994 established, among others, the National Science Foundation (NSF; formally founded in 1998 for funding scientific research in the country) and the National Science and Technology Commission (NASTEC; formally founded in August 1998 to formulate scientific policy) under the newly established Ministry of Science and Technology (MoST). Despite these efforts, R&D investments in the country were minimal, being just 0.19% GDP in 2006 (0.11% in 2008), lower than regional peers such as India (0.61%) and Malaysia (0.63%), and generally holding at <0.2% through the years. This has been attributed to various factors, including a lack of an innovation culture in Sri Lanka and a risk-averse private sector that did not see much benefit in local R&D ventures. Sri Lanka has thus underperformed significantly in increasing the share of high technology exports as a percentage of its total manufactured exports when compared to regional peers such as India.

== History ==
The National Nanotechnology Initiative was formed informally in the early 2000s as a collaborative effort between a group of expatriate Sri Lankan scientists and officials from the NSF and the MoST, seeking to promote nanotechnology research in Sri Lanka. The Initiative cited several other related objectives:

- developing nanotechnology-based industry in Sri Lanka
- attracting nanotechnology expertise of Sri Lankans both in the country and outside it
- increasing the competitiveness of local industry through local R&D
- value addition to national resources slated for exports
- developing a local skills base centered around nanotechnology.

The Initiative approached the minister of science and technology at the time, Tissa Vitharana, going on to brief the president in a presentation in November 2005. This resulted in a cabinet memorandum the same year, proposing the formal commitment of the Government of Sri Lanka to the initiative, which was approved by the cabinet on 23 August 2006. It defined a broad objective of generating a pool of experts with all necessary facilities for nanotechnology-based research at a national level. Due to a lack of funds, however, the project stagnated until the efforts of Ravi Silva, a Sri Lankan professor and nanotechnology specialist at the University of Surrey, who persuaded five private companies to consider investing in the venture.

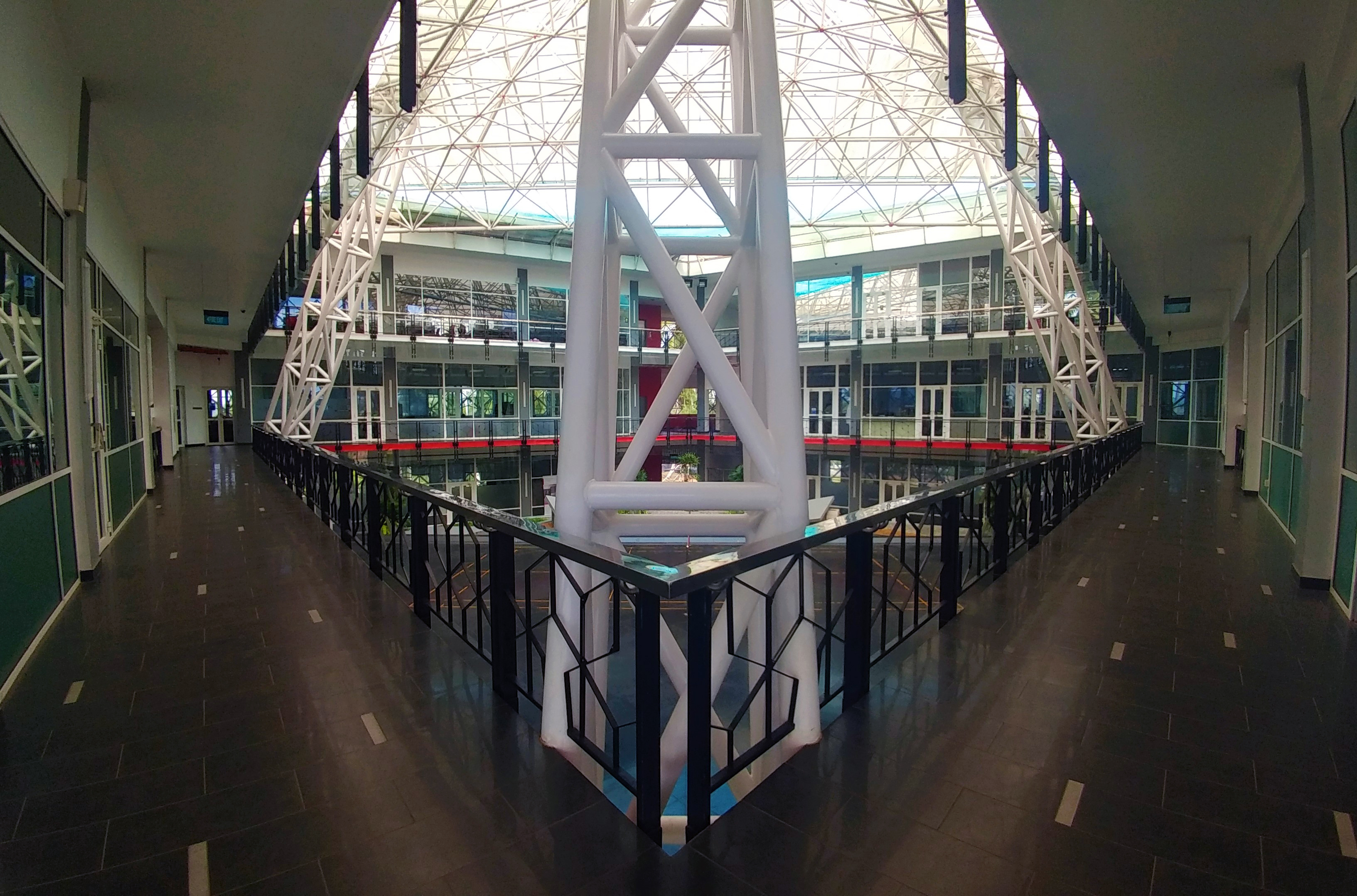
Inside the Center for Excellence, opened in 2013. The building contains seven laboratories, including a dedicated basement facility for an X-ray photoelectron spectrometer, scanning electron microscope and a transmission electron microscope, as well as office space

SLINTEC was incorporated as a private company in April 2008. In September of that year, the Board of Investment signed an agreement with NANCO for the development and management of a nanotechnology park in Homagama. SLINTEC was launched officially on 1 December 2008, with initial work taking place in a garage; formal research work commenced on 12 August 2009, operating out of MAS Holdings' Silueta complex within the Biyagama Export Processing Zone, with research staff drawn from local universities. In 2010, NANCO was merged into SLINTEC. The construction of phase 1a of the Nanotechnology Center for Excellence on 50 acres of land within the Homagama Nanotechnology and Science Park began in June 2012, with the hexagonal facility formally opening on 21 October 2013. It currently houses both SLINTEC and the SLINTEC Academy, and a second hexagon is slated for completion by 2019.

In 2013, Lankem joined SLINTEC as its sixth private sector partner.

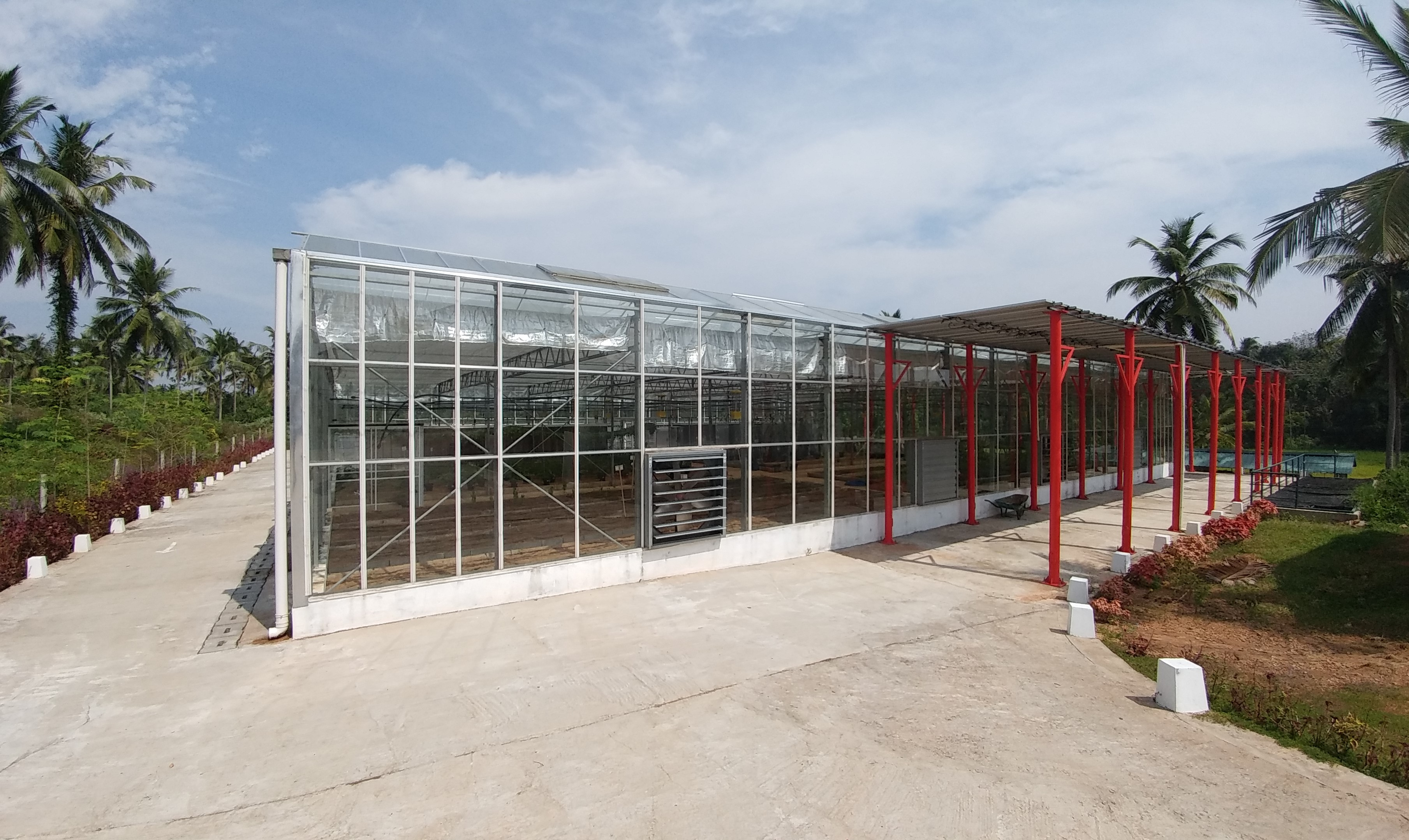
The greenhouse complex within the nanotechnology park

In 2016, the Yunnan Rural Science and Technology Service Center helped establish a greenhouse within the Nanotechnology Park for use by SLINTEC.

=== Private sector collaboration ===
In March 2012, SLINTEC signed two commercial agreements:

- One with Nagarjuna Fertilizers and Chemicals Ltd. (NFCL), India. Funded by the agrochemicals arm of its private sector partner Hayleys, SLINTEC had undertaken research into a nanoparticle-based slow-release fertilizer that reduced fertilizer loss through leaching, microbial degradation and other methods (accounting for between 50-70% of conventional fertilizer wastage). NFCL bought the patent for the slow-release fertilizer for US$2.2 million, acquiring rights for commercial production and distribution outside Sri Lanka. As part of the agreement, NFCL invested a further US$0.8 million as a seed fund for SLINTEC to develop second- and third-generation nanotechnology-based fertilizer products for NFCL.
- Another with LAUGFS Holdings, wherein the two companies would establish a pilot plant to produce titanium dioxide from the country's large ilmenite mineral sands reserves, ranked 9th in the world at close to 18 million metric tonnes. The venture was based on SLINTEC research initially funded by the Ministry of Technology and Research and the National Science Foundation, drawing a LKR 80 million investment from LAUGFS.

Other private sector clients of SLINTEC include MAS Holdings, Teejay Lanka PLC (formerly Textured Jersey), CIC Holdings, British Cosmetics (who launched a new product range in June 2018 based on research carried out by SLINTEC) and Dynawash (introducing a new, environmentally friendly natural textile dyeing technology using biomass pigments).

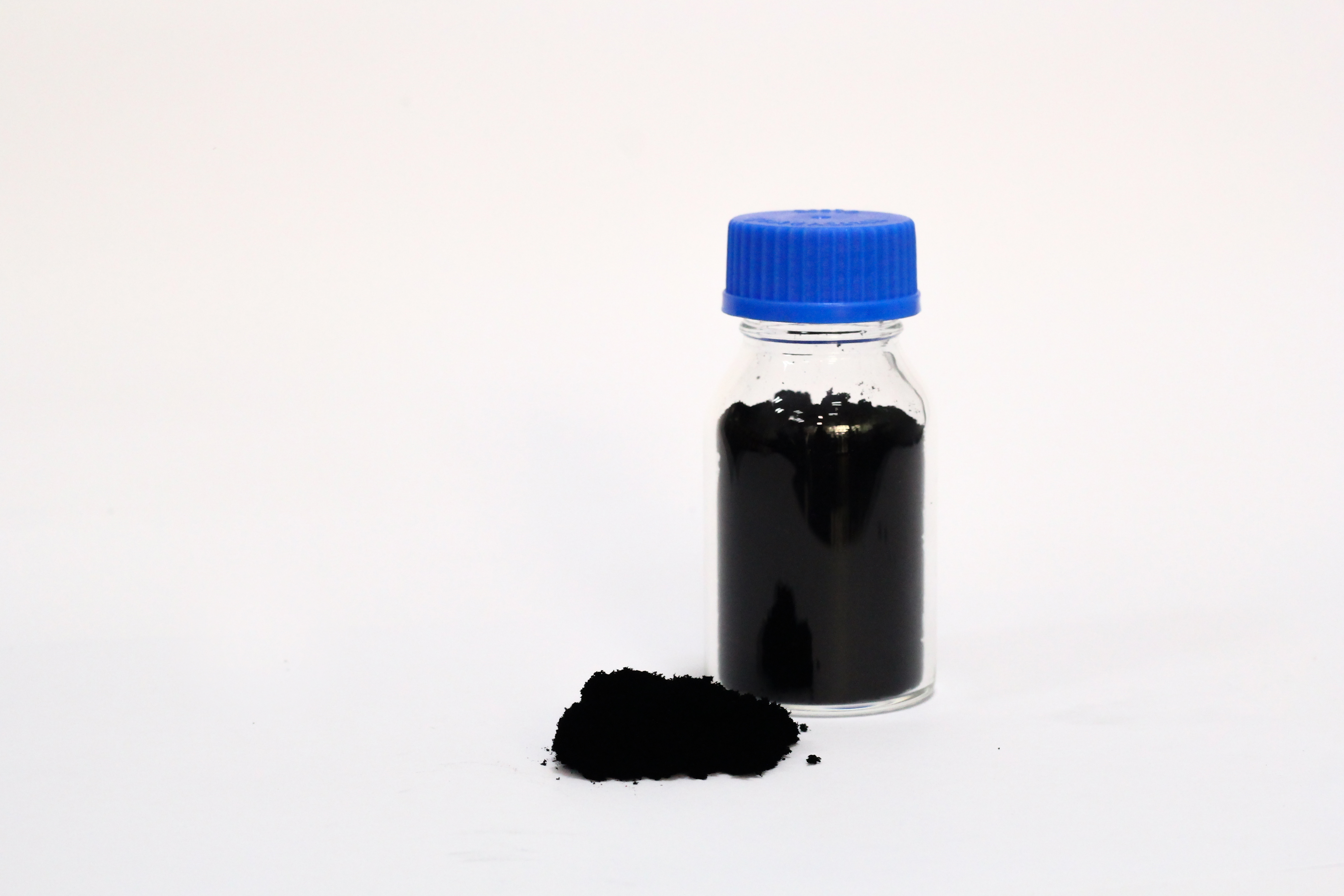
Reduced Graphene Oxide Produced by SLINTEC Process

Ceylon Graphene Technologies (Pvt) Ltd, a joint venture of LOLC Group and SLINTEC that aims to place Sri Lanka in the global market for graphene and associated products, was established in June 2018.

=== COVID-19-related technologies ===
In April 2020, SLINTEC announced that its scientists were able to reverse engineer nasopharyngeal swabs used for COVID-19 specimen collection and they have started manufacturing test kits consisting of Nasopharyngeal swabs and Oropharyngeal (Throat) swabs at a production capacity of 3,000 specimen collection kits per day.

== Research focus areas ==
- Agriculture
  - Nanofertilizers
  - Insecticides and pesticides
  - Targeted nutrient systems
- Apparel/textiles
  - Nanofabrics
  - Smart fabrics
- Energy
- Graphene
  - production of graphene from graphite
  - graphene applications
- Advanced materials
- Healthcare
  - Nutraceuticals/natural product research

== SLINTEC Academy ==
Academy of the Sri Lanka Institute of Nanotechnology
- Motto: Latin: Educare et Educere
- Type: Graduate school
- Established: 2017
- Parent institution: Sri Lanka Institute of Nanotechnology
- Chancellor: Ishara Nanayakkara
- Vice-Chancellor: Veranja Karunaratne
- Provost: Ranil Gunaratne
- Academic staff: 30
- Postgraduates: 27
- Doctoral students: 6
- Location: Nanotechnology & Science Park, Mahenwatta, Pitipana, Homagama 10206, Sri Lanka; 6.826241°N 80.038178°E
- Campus: Urban
- Language: English
- Colors

The Academy of the Sri Lanka Institute of Nanotechnology (also known as SLINTEC Academy) is a private non-profit graduate school, founded as SLINTEC's knowledge dissemination arm. The school offers MPhil and PhD degrees in Nano- and Advanced Sciences, and was formally inaugurated on 22 September 2017 at the Lakshman Kadirgamar Institute. The Academy focuses on industry-oriented research as a core component of its course-/degree work, with a view towards creating a skills base within the country.

=== Establishment ===
Extraordinary gazette 2032/23 of the Government of Sri Lanka recognized SLINTEC as a degree-awarding higher education institute on 16 August 2017. SLINTEC then established the Academy as a separate entity for the execution of the institute's educational mandate, with industrialist and entrepreneur Mahesh Amalean appointed Chancellor. The school's first intake consisted of 19 students: 6 PhD- and 13 MPhil researchers.

== Academic staff ==
- Ruchira Wijesena - Senior Lecturer at the Institute of Technology, University of Moratuwa, Doctor of Philosophy in Materials Chemistry, University of Colombo and alumnus of Nalanda College Colombo.

== See also ==
- Higher education in Sri Lanka
- List of universities in Sri Lanka
- Research in Sri Lanka
