= Heladiv =

Sri Lankan tea company

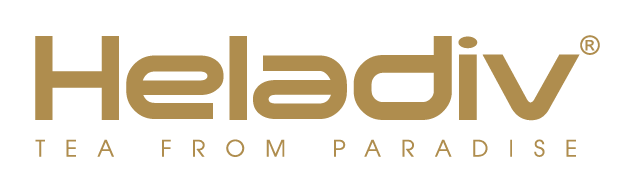
- company logo
- Company type: Public
- Traded as: CSE: HVA.N0000
- ISIN: LK0374N00005
- Industry: Beverage
- Founded: August 22, 1997; 28 years ago
- Headquarters: Colombo, Sri Lanka
- Area served: Worldwide
- Key people: B. S. M. De Silva (Chairman); C. Hettiarachchi (CEO)
- Products: Ceylon tea
- Revenue: ▲LKR1,164 million (2021)
- Operating income: ▲LKR164 million (2021)
- Net income: ▲LKR78 million (2021)
- Total assets: ▲LKR1,285 million (2021)
- Total equity: ▲LKR15 million (2021)
- Owner: George Steuart and Company Ltd (51.01%); HVA Lanka Exports (Pvt) Ltd (10.00%)
- Number of employees: ▼54 (2021)
- Website: www.heladiv.com

Heladiv, publicly traded as HVA Foods PLC, is a tea company based in Sri Lanka.

== History ==
Heladiv commenced operations in 1990 as HVA Lanka Exports Pvt. Ltd., an affiliate of a Dutch-based agricultural development company, Handels Vereniging Amsterdam (Amsterdam Trade Association).

In 1993, the company reverted to 100% Sri Lankan ownership.

In 2001, they introduced the concept of Tetra Paking of Iced Tea to Sri Lanka. In 2007, the company received an ISO 22000 accreditation by Bureau Veritas and was awarded the Lanka Star, for Packaging Excellence from the Sri Lanka Institute of Packaging, and a Soorya Sinha Awarind from the Mawbima Lanka Padanama.

In 2011, the company was publicly listed on the Sri Lankan stock exchange.

The brand name, Heladiv, is derived from the word "Heladiva", which means our land. The Heladiv product range includes ice tea, regular tea bags, flavoured tea bags, green tea, flavoured green tea, herbal infusions, leaf tea in pouches, pet jars, metal canisters, wooden boxes and gift packs.

The company operates over fifty tea cafes across China and a tea lounge in Colombo. The brand Heladiv is registered and sold in over 40 countries.

In 2014/2015 the company generated a gross profit of Rs 113,838,502.
