= Ishara Nanayakkara =

Sri Lankan businessman

- Occupation: Businessman / Entrepreneur

Ishara Chinthaka Nanayakkara is a Sri Lankan entrepreneur and businessman. As of August 2025, he is the Richest man in Sri Lanka. He is currently serving as the deputy group chairman of the LOLC Holdings. His father Rajah Nanayakkara was also a prominent businessman and he died in 2017 at the age of 77. Ishara is considered a billionaire with a net worth of around 1.6 Billion. Mostly locked up in investments in LOLC and Browns.

== Biography ==
Nanayakkara's father Rajah was an entrepreneur and founded the automobile industry through Ishara Traders in 1973 which is now regarded as the pioneer in importing reconditioned repaired vehicles from Japan to Sri Lanka. Ishara as a teenage was sent to Japan for extensive training after his secondary education at Royal College, Colombo 07. He holds a diploma in Business Accounting from Australia's Dandenong College.

== Career ==
Nanayakkara pursued his career in financial services and started investing in finance companies such as LOLC. He was also appointed to the Board of Directors of LOLC in 2002. He also served as deputy chairman of Lanka Orix Finance from 2011 to 2018 and was appointed as the chairman of Browns Investments in 2013. In September 2018, he resigned from the Board of Directors of Seylan Bank.

He was appointed as chairman of LOLC in 2018 after previously serving as a board member from 2002 to 2018. Under his leadership, LOLC also reached total assets amounting to 1.008 trillion as of December 2018. In 2019, he eventually toppled Dhammika Perera to become the richest person in Sri Lanka after a Korean bank came forward with interest and intention to buy the LOLC's subsidiary Cambodian microfinance arm for a staggering US$603.4 million. His Browns Healthcare was acquired by another business magnate Harry Jayawardena for LKR 1.6 billion in February 2020.

He received the prestigious Young Entrepreneur of the Year award at the Asia Pacific Entrepreneurship Awards in 2012. He is the current chairman of Sri Lanka Institute of Nanotechnology.
