= CIC Holdings =

CIC Holdings PLC
- Logo of CIC Holdings PLC
- Company type: Public
- Traded as: CSE: CIC.N0000
- ISIN: LK0045N00001
- Industry: Materials
- Founded: 1964; 62 years ago
- Founder: Imperial Chemical Industries
- Headquarters: Colombo, Sri Lanka
- Key people: S. H. Amarasekera (Chairman); P. A. Seresinhe (CEO)
- Revenue: ▲LKR68.275 billion (2023)
- Operating income: ▲LKR16.843 billion (2023)
- Net income: ▲LKR10.052 billion (2023)
- Total assets: ▲LKR55.803 billion (2023)
- Total equity: ▲LKR27.829 billion (2023)
- Owners: Paints & General Industries Ltd (53.31%); Employees' Provident Fund (9.06%); Chacra Capital Holdings (Pvt) Ltd (4.49%)
- Number of employees: 2,109 (2023)
- Parent: Paints & General Industries Ltd
- Subsidiaries: Chemanex PLC; CIC Agri Businesses; CIC Feeds; Link Natural Products (Pvt) Ltd
- Website: cic.lk

CIC Holdings PLC is a Sri Lankan conglomerate holding company engaged in merchandising and manufacturing chemical products. The company was incorporated in 1964 and listed on the Colombo Stock Exchange in the same year. Initially, the company was a part of Imperial Chemical Industries and prior to 2011, was known as Chemical Industries (Colombo) PLC. The company ranked 41st in LMD 100, an annual list of leading listed companies in Sri Lanka. The company also ranked 31st in Business Today's Top 40 for 2020–21 financial year.

== History ==
Chemical Industries (Colombo) was founded in 1964 as a part of Imperial Chemical Industries, a former UK-based chemical company. The company shifted its business model by moving into agribusiness away from Dulux paints and fertilizer. To reflect the change the company was planning to change the name of the company. The company followed up this by changing its name to the current name in 2011. The company signed an agreement with the Sri Lanka Institute of Nanotechnology to develop a new herbicide formulation. The initiative is one of the first attempts to synthesize and formulate a herbicide locally in Sri Lanka. The company appointed Dinesh Weerakkody as an Independent non-Executive Director and Amal Cabraal as the non-Executive Chairman of CIC Feeds in 2015. In November 2015, the company sold its subsidiary, Chemifix, a PVAc adhesive business to Pidilite Industries.

== Operations ==
CIC Holdings acquired 70% of stake of Unipower (Pvt) Ltd in 2017 for LKR238 million. The company won the award for the most innovative research in the non-plantation agriculture sector in 2018. The award is conferred by the Sri Lanka Council for Agricultural Research Policy, the apex body of agriculture research in Sri Lanka. The award ceremony was held at the Institute of Policy Studies. The company recorded strong revenue growth for the quarter ended in September 2021. The revenue of LKR9.54 billion is a 4.5 per cent year-on-year increase for the same period in 2020. The company appointed Prashantha Aroshan Seresinhe as the new Group CEO in December 2021.

== See also ==
- List of companies listed on the Colombo Stock Exchange
