= Hatton National Bank =

Sri Lankan commercial bank

Hatton National Bank PLC
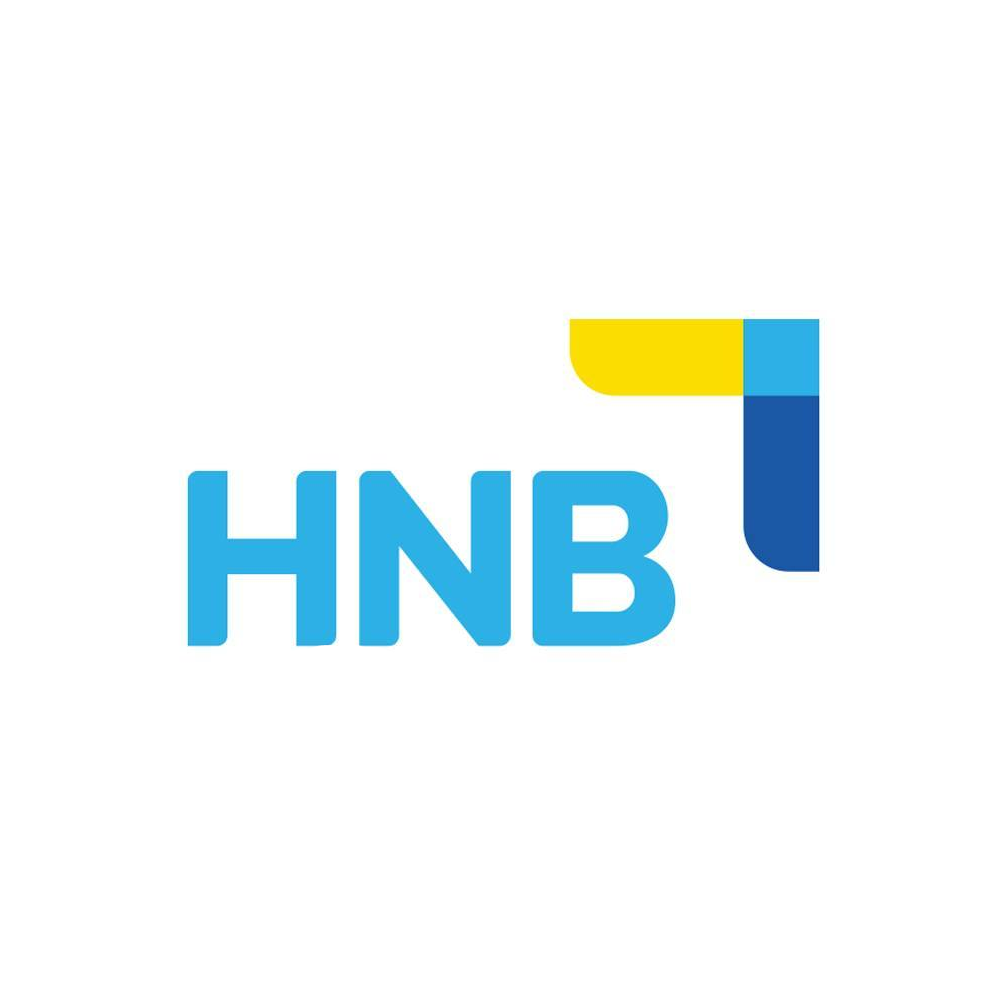
- Hatton National Bank logo
- Company type: Public
- Traded as: CSE: HNB.N0000
- ISIN: LK0078N00002
- Industry: Financial services
- Founded: 1888; 138 years ago
- Headquarters: Colombo, Sri Lanka
- Number of locations: 255 branches (825 ATMs) (2023)
- Key people: Nihal Jayawardene (Chairman); Damith Pallewatte (MD/CEO)
- Revenue: ▲LKR336.638 billion (2023)
- Operating income: ▼LKR149.5 billion (2023)
- Net income: ▼LKR1.606 billion (2023)
- Total assets: ▲LKR2.047 trillion (2023)
- Total equity: ▲LKR219.557 billion (2023)
- Owners: Browns Investments (9.99%); Employees' Provident Fund (9.75%); Sri Lanka Insurance (8.27%); Milford Exports (Ceylon) (7.91%)
- Number of employees: ▲8,989 (2023)
- Subsidiaries: HNB Life PLC (previously HNB Assurance); HNB Finance PLC; Prime Finance PLC; Acuity Partners (Pvt) Ltd; Lanka Ventures PLC
- Website: www.hnb.lk

Hatton National Bank PLC (commonly abbreviated as HNB) is a private bank in Sri Lanka with 255 branches and 825 ATMs. The bank traces its origin to 1888 when Hatton Bank commenced its operations in Hatton, Sri Lanka.

Founded in 1888 in Hatton to serve the local tea-plantation economy, the bank was later incorporated as Hatton National Bank in 1970 following a merger with branches of Grindlays Bank. It is headquartered in Colombo and, as of 2023, operates 255 branches and 825 ATMs across the country.

== History ==
In 1947, Ceylonese conglomerate Brown and Company acquired Hatton Bank and the Hatton Transport and Agency Co, thus becoming the Browns Group. In 1970, Hatton Bank acquired two branches of Grindlays National Bank and became Hatton National Bank.

== Awards and recognition ==
Hatton National Bank (HNB) was recognized as one of Sri Lanka’s Top 10 Most Admired Companies for 2022, marking its fifth consecutive appearance in this prestigious ranking. The accolade was jointly presented by the American Institute of Certified Public Accountants (AICPA), the Chartered Institute of Management Accountants (CIMA), and the International Chamber of Commerce Sri Lanka (ICCSL).

== Subsidiaries performance ==
In June 2022, HNB Finance PLC—a wholly owned subsidiary of Hatton National Bank—delivered an exceptional operational turnaround. It recorded Group Net Interest Income of Rs 3,903.9 million and Group Total Operating Income of Rs 4,929.9 million, with all business lines returning to profitability thanks to improved disbursement growth and cost optimization efforts.

== See also ==
- List of banks in Sri Lanka
- List of companies listed on the Colombo Stock Exchange
