= LMD (magazine) =

Sri Lankan business magazine

- Cover of the January 2022 issue, which portrays Yohani, magazine's 2021 Sri Lankan of the year
- Editor-in-chief: Hiran Hewavisenti
- Categories: Business
- Frequency: Monthly
- Format: Print and digital magazine
- Circulation: 5,000
- Publisher: Media Services (Pvt) Ltd
- First issue: August 1994; 32 years ago
- Country: Sri Lanka
- Based in: Colombo
- Language: English
- Website: lmd.lk
- ISSN: 1391-135X
- OCLC: 1229177893

LMD, formerly known as Lanka Monthly Digest, is an English language Sri Lankan business magazine. Media Services (Pvt) Ltd owns the magazine, and was first issued in August 1994. The magazine is available in print and online versions. Hiran Hewavisenti is the magazine's editor-in-chief. LMD derives its revenue from advertising and subscription fees. Monthly circulation is about 5,000 while monthly readership is around 30,000-40,000. The magazine has a subscriber base of about 1,800. Living and Discover Sri Lanka are the sister publications of the magazine.

== Compiled lists and indices ==
LMD compiles and publishes popular company listings, rankings and indices.

Publication	Notes
LMD 100	Dubbed "Sri Lanka's Fortune 500." A list of leading 100 quoted companies in Sri Lanka.
Sri Lanka’s Most Respected Entities	An annual survey carried out in collaboration with Nielsen with 800 corporate respondents.
LMD-Nielsen Business Confidence Index	A monthly survey-based index.
Sri Lankan of The Year	The Sri Lankan who has made the most outstanding contribution each year.
A-List of Sri Lankan Businesspeople	A list of leading business personalities

== LMD 100 ==
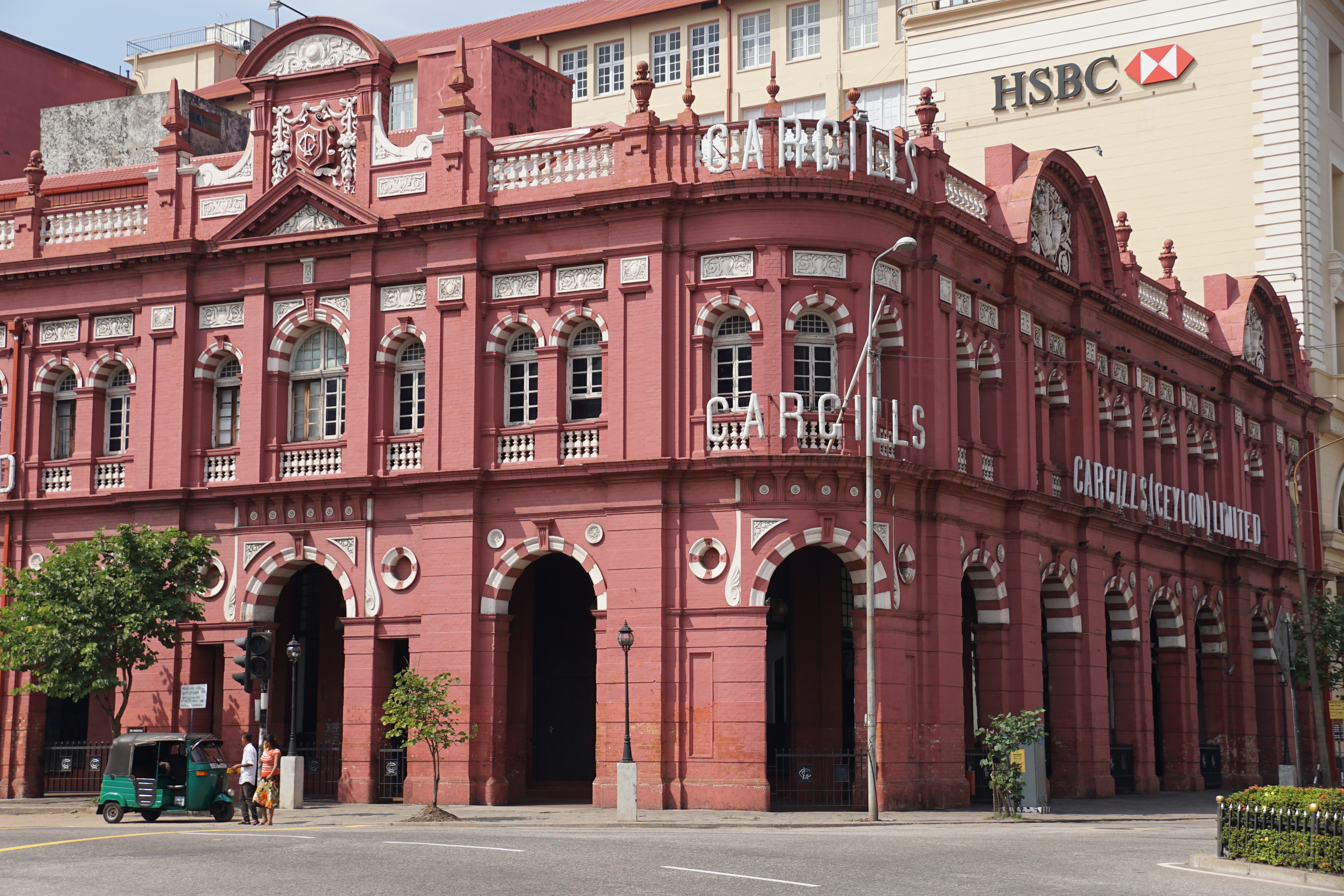
Cargills (Ceylon) has been ranked amongst the top 15 on LMD 100 continuously for the past decade.

Dubbed "Sri Lanka's Fortune 500." The magazine has been publishing the LMD 100 since the 1994/95 fiscal year. The latest edition, the 29th edition of LMD 100 was published for the fiscal year 2021/2022 in 2023. Sri Lankan conglomerate, Hayleys was ranked first for the fifth consecutive year in 2022.

2021/22 Rank	2020/21 Rank	Company	Revenue 2021/22 Rs (mns)	Revenue 2020/21 Rs (mns)
1	2	Expolanka Holdings	694,157	218,735
2	1	Hayleys	338,010	241,276
3	3	LOLC Holdings	224,100	160,482
4	6	John Keells Holdings	218,075	127,676
5	8	Carson Cumberbatch	170,695	114,836
6	9	Bukit Darah	170,656	114,808
7	4	Commercial Bank of Ceylon	163,675	151,966
8	7	Dialog Axiata	141,915	120,142
9	10	C T Holdings	136,873	112,941
10	11	Cargills (Ceylon)	136,692	112,607
11	5	Hatton National Bank	135,710	134,436
12	12	Sampath Bank	113,075	109,208
13	15	Melstacorp	106,071	77,682
14	13	Sri Lanka Telecom	102,348	91,119
15	14	Vallibel One	96,859	81,035
16	18	Lanka IOC	89,951	66,686
17	16	Ceylon Cold Stores	84,543	68,766
18	19	Hemas Holdings	78,831	64,501
19	17	Singer (Sri Lanka)	76,848	67,412
20	22	Richard Pieris & Company	67,668	56,725
21	20	National Development Bank	64,083	61,632
22	23	Ceylinco Insurance	60,613	55,924
23	24	Ceylon Beverage Holdings	60,211	51,172
24	25	Lion Brewery (Ceylon)	58,571	49,849
25	27	Royal Ceramics Lanka	57,545	44,972
26	–	Hela Apparel Holdings	56,180	32,155
27	26	Dipped Products	55,294	46,387
28	21	Seylan Bank	54,751	58,443
29	38	Aitken Spence	54,152	31,461
30	29	Tokyo Cement	52,478	42,962
31	–	Colombo Fort Land & Building	51,556	43,231
32	42	Brown and Company	50,304	29,391
33	37	Teejay Lanka	49,588	31,780
34	31	Nestlé Lanka	45,420	37,866
35	28	DFCC Bank	43,029	43,604
36	32	CIC Holdings	41,760	37,233
37	41	Lanka Walltiles	39,858	29,423
38	47	Access Engineering	39,630	23,837
39	30	Nations Trust Bank	38,378	40,466
40	39	Diesel & Motor Engineering	37,507	30,819
41	–	ACL Cables	35,329	22,619
42	33	LAUGFS Gas	34,597	35,534
43	36	Ceylon Tobacco Company	33,615	32,073
44	44	Haycarb	33,160	25,485
45	43	Distilleries Company of Sri Lanka	33,069	29,238
46	35	People's Leasing & Finance	32,631	33,645
47	45	Sunshine Holdings	32,166	24,339
48	60	Hayleys Fabric	31,653	14,769
49	34	LOLC Finance	30,570	33,762
50	40	LB Finance	30,157	29,930

Source: LMD 100

== Sri Lankan of The Year ==
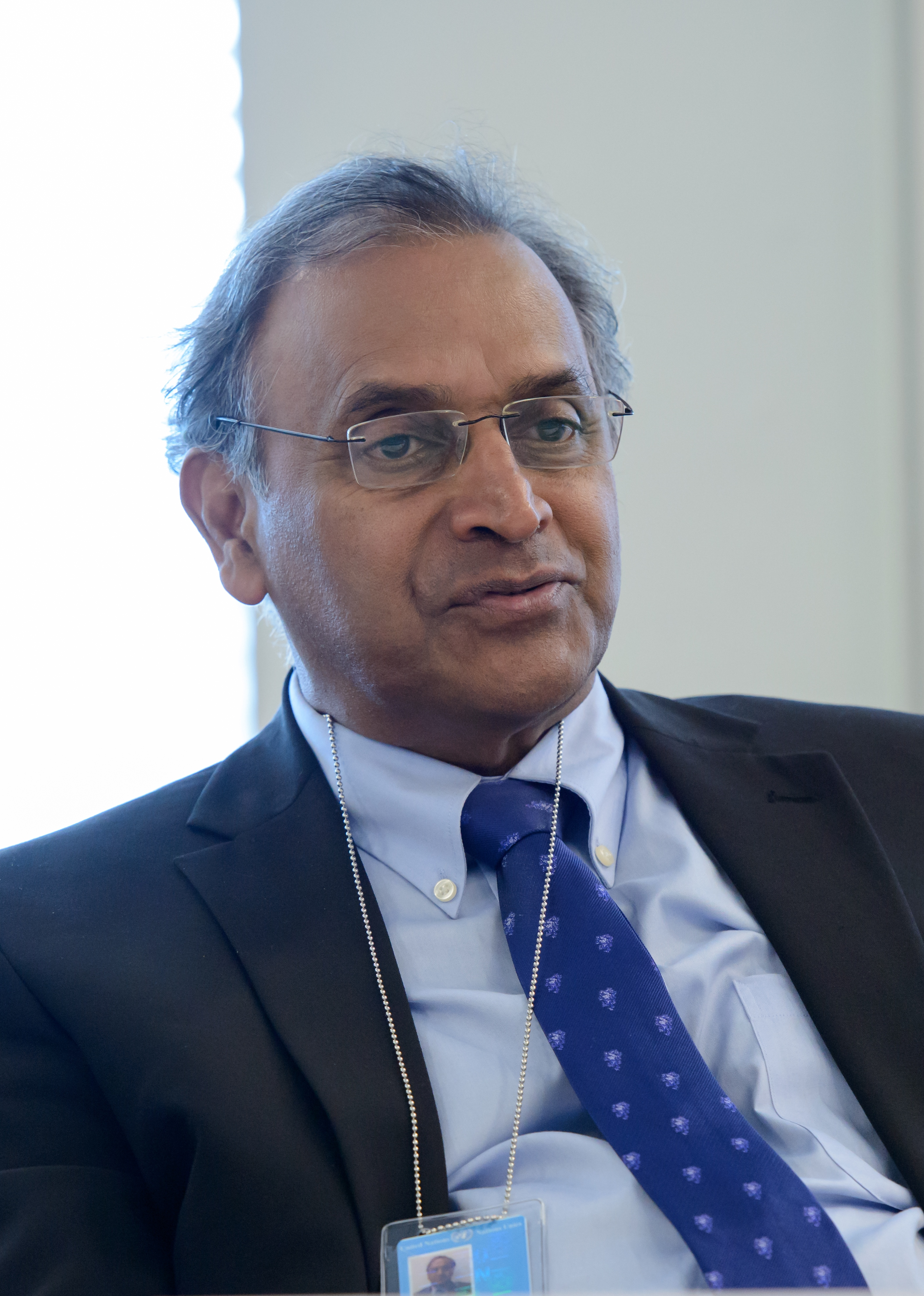
Sri Lankan diplomat, Jayantha Dhanapala was LMD's 2006 Sri Lankan of the Year

Year	Person	Notes
1995	Lakshman Kadirgamar	The Minister of Foreign Affairs
1996	Arjuna Ranatunga and "the boys"	Under the captaincy of Ranatunga, Sri Lankan team won the 1996 Cricket World Cup
1997	Sanath Jayasuriya	Became Sri Lanka's first triple centurian
1998	Ken Balendra	Chairman of John Keells Holdings
1999	Lalith Kotelawala	Chairman of Ceylinco Consolidated
2000	Susanthika Jayasinghe	Became the first Olympic medallist since 1948 in Women's 200 metres.
2001	Chandra Jayaratne	Managing Director of Eagle Insurance
2002	Ranil Wickremesinghe	The Prime Minister of Sri Lanka
2003	K. N. Choksy	The Minister of Finance
2004	Dayananda Dissanayake	The Election Commissioner of Sri Lanka
2005	Lakshman Kadirgamar	The Minister of Foreign Affairs. Assassinated in 2005.
2006	Jayantha Dhanapala	The Under Secretary General of the United Nations for Disarmament
2007	Wijeyadasa Rajapakshe	Chairman of the Committee On Public Enterprises (COPE)
2008	Hans Wijayasuriya	COO of TM International Berhad
2009	Mahinda Rajapaksa	The President of Sri Lanka
2010	Muttiah Muralitharan	Retired from Test cricket as the leading wicket taker
2011	Kumar Sangakkara	Delivering the MCC Spirit of Cricket Cowdrey Lecture
2012	Pradeep Sanjaya	Became the first Sri Lankan Paralympian to win a medal in Men's 400 metres T46
2013	Susantha Ratnayake	Chairman of John Keells Holdings
2014	"The Sri Lankan cricketer"	Sri Lankan Cricket team won their second world title at 2014 ICC World Twenty20
2015	Mahinda Deshapriya	The Election Commissioner of Sri Lanka
2016	Indrajit Coomaraswamy	The Governor of the Central Bank of Sri Lanka
2017	Jacqueline Fernandez	Bollywood actress, starred in According to Matthew
2018	Asha de Vos	Marine biologist, listed on the BBC's 100 Women
2019	Kumar Sangakkara	The President of Marylebone Cricket Club
2020	"The healthcare worker"	"been pushed to the forefront of efforts to mitigate the impact of the highly contagious respiratory disease"
2021	Yohani	Singer, songwriter.
2022	Saliya Pieris	President of the Bar Association of Sri Lanka
2023	Tharushi Karunarathna	Asian Championships Gold Medalist
2024	Yevan David	Racing driver who is set to compete in the FIA Formula 3 Championship

Source: lmd.lk

== Most Awarded 2021 ==
LMD Most Awarded index tallies the cumulative awards won by business establishments in the respective calendar year.

Most Awarded 2021 Hall of Fame
2021	2019/20	Entity	Total Awards
1	2	National Development Bank	60
2	10	Aitken Spence Hotel Holdings	53
2	1	Commercial Bank of Ceylon	53
4	20	Softlogic Life Insurance	36
5	20	Dialog Axiata	34
6	23	Ceylon Biscuits	32
7	14	Union Assurance	30
8	9	Aitken Spence	28
9	50	Dilmah Ceylon Tea Company	22
9	50	Jetwing Hotels	22
