= Commercial Bank of Ceylon =

Sri Lankan commercial bank

Commercial Bank of Ceylon PLC
- Type: Public
- Traded as: CSE: COMB.N0000
- ISIN: LK0053N00005
- Industry: Financial
- Founded: 1920 as Eastern Bank Ltd. 25 June 1969; 57 years ago as Commercial Bank of Ceylon Ltd
- Headquarters: Colombo, Sri Lanka
- Number of locations: ▲291 branches (948 ATMs) (2024)
- Area served: Sri Lanka; Bangladesh; Maldives; Myanmar
- Key people: Sharhan Muhseen (Chairman); Raja Senanayake (Deputy Chairman); Sanath Manatunge (CEO)
- Revenue: ▼US$ 938.485 million (2024)
- Operating income: ▼US$ 365.390 million (2024)
- Net income: ▲US$ 190.057 million (2024)
- Total assets: ▲US$ 9.815 billion (2024)
- Total equity: ▲US$ 975494 million (2024)
- Owners: Indra Silva (9.87%); DFCC Bank (9.72%); David Pieris (9.68%); EPF (8.24%); IFC (7.09%)
- Number of employees: ▲5,201 (2024)
- Subsidiaries: Commercial Development Company PLC; CBC Tech Solutions Limited; CBC Finance Ltd.; Commercial Insurance Brokers (Pvt) Ltd.; Commex Sri Lanka S.R.L. Italy; Commercial Bank of Maldives Private Limited; CBC Myanmar Microfinance Company Limited
- Website: www.combank.lk

Commercial Bank of Ceylon PLC (CBC) also known as Commercial Bank or ComBank is a licensed commercial bank in Sri Lanka and its ownership is private. It was incorporated as a public limited company and it is listed on the Colombo Stock Exchange. It is regarded as the largest private bank in Sri Lanka in terms of net worth and capital. The bank is currently the third largest bank in Sri Lanka in terms of total net assets and it lies behind only Bank of Ceylon and People's Bank (both are state commercial banks). It is also the only private sector licensed bank in Sri Lanka to be designated as the higher-tier domestic systemically important bank according to the Central Bank of Sri Lanka. The bank currently operates a network of 291 branches and around 948 ATM machines across Sri Lanka.

It became the first Sri Lankan bank to be listed in among the top 1000 banks in the world according to The Banker when it achieved the feat for the first time in 2008. Commercial Bank has also been ranked among the top 1000 banks in the world for nearly 11 successive years from 2008 to 2021.

It is considered as one of the most systemically important banks in Sri Lanka. It is the largest lender to Sri Lanka's Small and Medium Enterprise sector. The Ministry of Finance of Sri Lanka revealed that the Commercial Bank of Ceylon was the biggest lender to SME sector for the year 2020 amounting to an estimated amount of 21.6 billion rupees which was 15% more than the second biggest lender to SME.

== History ==
The bank was originally formed in 1920 and carried banking practices under the name as Eastern Bank. The first branch of Eastern Bank Ltd. (EBL) was opened at Chatham Street in Fort. During the 1930s and 1940s, the Barclays Bank acquired the shares of the Eastern Bank. The Chartered Bank bought the shares of Eastern Bank from the Barclays Bank in 1957 but the Chartered Bank ran the Eastern Bank for the duration of only four years. On 25 June 1969, Commercial Bank Ceylon Ltd. was incorporated with Eastern Bank holding 40% of its equity. T. S Fernando Q.C served as the first chairman of Commercial Bank when he was appointed to the position in 1969.

The bank marked its centenary anniversary in 2020 and during the special 100th anniversary, the bank emphasized the main project focus on ‘Smart Classrooms on Science and Technology, Engineering and Mathematics (STEM) to be established in 100 schools in Sri Lanka'.

== Sustainability ==
The bank for several years has emphasized the priority towards attaining sustainability through its banking practices and policies. The bank focuses its sustainability practices across three themes including strategic business alignment, culture and footprint as well as responsibilities beyond the banking business. The three pillars of the sustainability focus by the Commercial Bank are sustainable banking, responsible organization and community impact. The sustainability initiatives of Commercial Bank are monitored and guided by the cross-functional Sustainability Steering Committee (SSC) which consists of key sustainability linked functional areas. The bank implemented and applied the Social and Environmental Risk Assessment System in Sri Lanka to screen lending projects which would pose zero harm to the environment. In 2015, the bank launched a new paperless green banking facility which further demonstrated the bank's focus on prioritizing the green technology and sustainable development.

It became the first and only bank in Sri Lanka to have achieved 100% carbon neutrality status. Thus, the bank achieved carbon neutrality for the entirety of its operations encompassing all of its 268 branches along with the main head office. It is reported that the bank had financed Sri Lanka's first financially viable wind power project and also the first ever commercial-scale solar power project in Sri Lanka. The bank became one of the founding members of the Sri Lanka Banks' Association of the Sustainable Banking Initiative.

== Operations ==
Commercial bank unveiled the online banking procedure to the customers in 2000.

In 2016, the bank launched Sri Lanka's first ever remittance card in order to ease the process of transferring funds from overseas to local beneficiaries.

The bank also launched Sri Lanka's first ever fully-automated cheque deposit machine in 2018. In 2018, the bank also achieved another feat by launching UnionPay cards to make Sri Lanka only the 51st country to launch UnionPay card system. In 2020, the bank launched a missed call alert service under the initiative "card balance by missed call service" for the credit cardholders. Commercial Bank also launched QR code enabled payment option called ComBank Q+ which facilitates cardholders to settle their outstanding credit card dues. It also became the first bank in Sri Lanka to enable the QR code payments to settle credit card bills and also became the first QR based payment app to be launched on LANKAQR platform.

In 2021, the bank opened a banking counter at the Department of Immigration and Emigration for the convenience of clients and staff. In 2021, the bank announced a partnership with a fintech startup called DirectPay to provide Internet Payment Gateway support and operate as the acquiring bank for the cashless payment solutions for the businesses. In 2021, the Commercial Bank joined hands with University of Moratuwa by offering to provide educational loans with preferential interest rates to postgraduate research students of the university.

In 2022, the bank introduced the First Time Home Buyers & Builders scheme that offers a free or discounted Decreasing Term Assurance Policy in order to eliminate or reduce burden of the cost of the loan protection insurance. In 2022, the bank also unveiled another loan scheme titled "Anagi Women's Banking" which was designed in collaboration with the International Finance Corporation to exclusively support and empower the women. The bank has maintained bancassurance partnership with Union Assurance for nearly 10 years whereas the customers of Commercial Bank obtain insurance related products from Union Assurance directly.

The bank launched its groundbreaking digital product "Flash" to facilitate convenient digital banking practices.

=== Subsidiaries ===
In July 2003, CBC acquired Credit Agricole Indosuez's two branches in Bangladesh at Dhaka and Chittagong to become the first Sri Lankan private bank to establish operations outside the country. (Banque Indosuez had opened its branches in Bangladesh in 1980.) Also in 2003, the IFC bought 15% of the bank's share capital from Sri Lanka Insurance Corporation.

In 2011, the credit rating of the Bangladesh operations of Commercial Bank was upgraded to AAA for long-term credit by the Credit Rating Information and Services Limited. Prior to obtaining Triple A rating, Bangladesh operations of Commercial Bank had maintained AA+ rating for three consecutive years from 2007 to 2010. The Commercial Bank Bangladesh was named as the Best Foreign Bank in Bangladesh and also named as the Most Sustainable Bank in Bangladesh for the year 2021.

== Awards and recognition ==
The bank was included among the Top 10 Most Admired Companies in Sri Lanka for the years 2018, 2019, 2020 and 2021. Euromoney adjudged Commercial Bank as the Best Bank in Sri Lanka in 2015, 2016, 2017, 2018, 2019, 2020 and 2021.

The bank won a total of 53 awards locally and internationally in 2019. Out of the 53 awards won, the bank won the Bank of the Year 2019 award from the UK based The Banker magazine as well as the award for the Best Bank in Sri Lanka 2019 from the US-based Global Finance magazine. The bank was rated as the strongest bank brand in Sri Lanka for the years 2020 and 2021 according to the statistics unveiled by Brand Finance.

In February 2022, the bank won the overall award for the Best Sustainability Report 2021 at the ACCA Sustainability Reporting Awards.

== Controversy ==
In 2021, the Financial Intelligent Unit of the Central Bank of Sri Lanka imposed a penalty of Rs. 3 million on the bank for failing to comply with the anti-money laundering laws.

== Sources ==
- Green, E., and S. Kinsey. 1999. The Paradise Bank (Aldershot: Ashgate).
