= ICRA Limited =

Indian Credit Rating Company

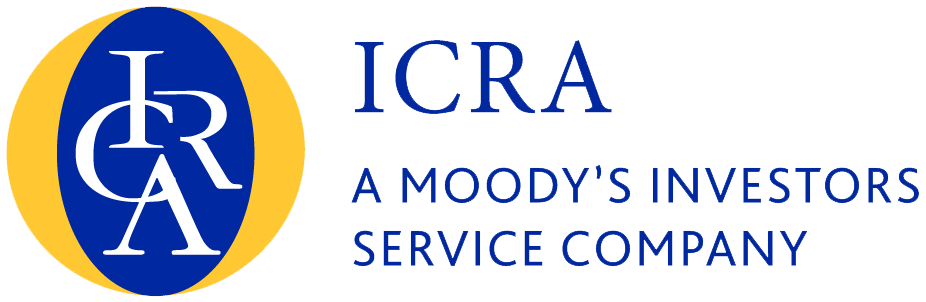
- Type: Public
- Traded as: BSE: 532835; NSE: ICRA
- Industry: Financial services
- Founded: 1991
- Headquarters: Gurgaon, India
- Key people: Ramnath Krishnan, Managing Director & Group CEO; Arun Duggal, Non-Executive chairman and independent director.
- Services: Credit ratings Financial consulting
- Revenue: ₹2.28 billion (US$24 million)
- Owner: Moody's Corporation

ICRA Limited (ICRA) is an Indian independent and professional investment information and credit rating agency headquartered in Gurugram, Haryana. Established in 1991, the company was originally named Investment Information and Credit Rating Agency of India Limited (IICRA India).

It was a joint-venture between Moody's and various Indian commercial banks and financial services companies. The company changed its name to ICRA Limited, and went public on 13 April 2007, with a listing on the Bombay Stock Exchange and the National Stock Exchange. As of end December 2024, Moody's Corporation owns a 51.86% majority stake.

== History ==
ICRA was set up in1991 by leading financial/investment institutions, commercial banks and financial services companies as an Independent and professional investment information and credit rating agency.

== Group Companies ==
As of August 2020, ICRA Ltd. operates the following subsidiaries:

1. ICRA Lanka Limited (ICRA Lanka) – credit rating agency licensed by the Securities and Exchange Commission of Sri Lanka (SEC) incorporated in December 2010 and was granted license by the SEC in May 2011.
2. ICRA Nepal Limited (ICRA Nepal) – first Credit Rating Agency in Nepal incorporated on 11 November 2011 and granted licence by the Securities Board of Nepal (SEBON) on 3 October 2012.
3. ICRA Analytics Limited – analytics and digital platforms for risk management, market data, consulting and knowledge services. ICRA Analytics was formed from the merger of ICRA Online Limited (ICRON) and ICRA Management Consulting Services Limited (IMaCS) in October 2019.

The following business formerly were part of the ICRA Group of Companies:

1. PT ICRA Indonesia (ICRAIndo) – ICRA pulled out of the Indonesia market in June 2015.
2. ICRA Techno Analytics Limited (ICTEAS) – ICTEAS was acquired by Pune-based global consulting and IT services solutions integrations company Nihilent Technologies in August 2016 for INR 687.5 million (US$10 million) and renamed Nihilent Analytics.
