= Employees' Provident Fund (Sri Lanka) =

- Founded: 1 June 1958; 68 years ago
- Founder: T. B. Ilangaratne
- Headquarters: 30, Janadhipathi Mawatha, Colombo 01.
- Revenue: ▲ Rs 222.44 billion (2018)
- Operating income: ▼ Rs 210 billion (2018)
- Net income: ▼ Rs 190.61 billion (2018)
- AUM: ▲ Rs 2,298.8 billion (2018)
- Total assets: ▲ Rs 2,133 billion (2018)
- Owner: Central Bank of Sri Lanka
- Parent: Ministry of Finance
- Website: epf.lk

The Employees' Provident Fund (EPF) is a social security scheme of employees in Sri Lanka under the Central Bank of Sri Lanka. It was established under Act No. 15 of 1958 by S. W. R. D. Bandaranaike, and as of December 2010, it had Rs 899.6 billion, which is equivalent to 16% of the GDP. The EPF offers a joint action plan by the employer and the employee to save money by targeting retirement and future to the government as well as the private sector. EPF invests in most Sri Lankan private companies such as Vallible One and Commercial Bank of Ceylon.

== See also ==
- Employees' Trust Fund
