= Beer in Asia =

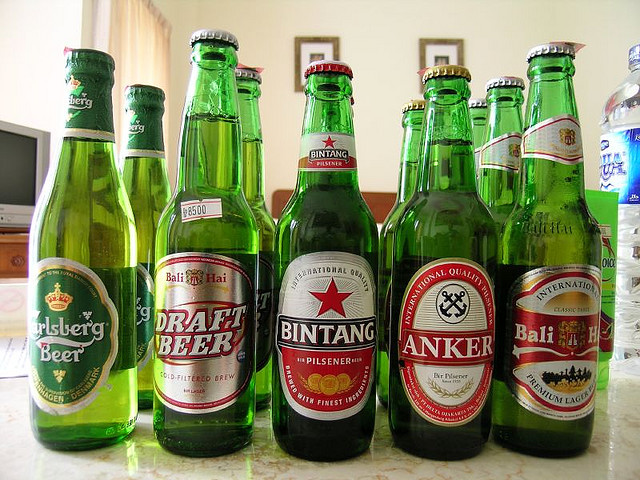
A beer assortment sold in Bali, Indonesia; Carlsberg, Bali Hai, Bintang and Anker Beer.

Beer in Asia began when beer was produced in Sumer, Mesopotamia (ancient Iraq) circa 6000 years ago. It was introduced by Europeans in the 19th century, with modern breweries established in British India, the Dutch East Indies (today Indonesia), China, and Japan. Asia's first modern brewery was established in 1830 in India entirely using European brewing technology.

Today, beer brewing is a growing industry in Asia. China has been the world's largest beer producer since 2001. Asia is the largest beer-producing region in the world since 2009. In 2013, Asian top beer producing countries were China (46.5 million kiloliters), Japan (5.5 million kiloliters), Vietnam (3.1 million kiloliters), Thailand (2.3 million kiloliters), South Korea (2 million kiloliters) and India (1.9 million kiloliters).

== History ==
=== Early history ===
Ancient Middle East is believed to be the cradle of beer, as it linked to the domestication of cereal and production of bread in the area. Chemical tests of ancient pottery jars reveal that beer was produced about 3,500 BCE in what is today Iran, and was one of the first-known biological engineering products using fermentation. Archaeological findings showing that Chinese villagers were brewing fermented alcoholic drinks as far back as 7,000 BCE on small and individual scale, with the production process and methods similar to that of ancient Egypt and Mesopotamia.

In Mesopotamia, early evidence of beer is a 3,900-year-old Sumerian poem honoring Ninkasi, the patron goddess of brewing, which contains the oldest surviving beer recipe, describing the production of beer from barley via bread.

=== Colonial period ===
==== British India ====
Edward Dyer moved from England to set up the first brewery in India (later incorporated as Dyer Breweries in 1855) at Kasauli in the Himalayan Mountains. The Kasauli brewery launched India's and Asia's first beer, Lion, which was in great demand by British administrators and troops stationed in the heat of India, one famous poster featured a satisfied British Tommy declaring, "as good as back home!".

The brewery was soon shifted to nearby Solan, close to the British summer capital Shimla, as there was an abundant supply of fresh springwater there. The Kasauli brewery site was converted to a distillery, which Mohan Meakin Ltd. still operate. Dyer set up more breweries at Shimla, Murree, Rawalpindi, Mandalay, Quetta and acquired interests in the Ootacamund Brewery (South India).

Another entrepreneur, H G Meakin, moved to India and bought the old Shimla and Solan Breweries from Edward Dyer and added more at Ranikhet, Dalhousie, Chakrata, Darjeeling, Kirkee and Nuwara Eliya (Ceylon). After the First World War, the Meakin and Dyer breweries merged and in 1937, when Burma was separated from India, the company was restructured with its Indian assets as Dyer Meakin Breweries, a public company on the London Stock Exchange.

Following Indian independence, N.N. Mohan raised funds and travelled to London where he acquired a majority stake in Dyer Meakin Breweries. He took over management of the company in 1949 and built new breweries at Lucknow, Ghaziabad and Khopoli (near Bombay). The company name was changed to Mohan Meakin Breweries in 1967.

On the death of N.N. Mohan in 1969, his eldest son Colonel V.R. Mohan took over as managing director. He introduced a number of new products that are brand leaders today, but died in 1973 soon after taking the helm. In the 1970s the manufacturing activities of the company were diversified into other fields including breakfast cereals, fruit juices, and mineral water under the leadership of Brigadier Kapil Mohan (Col. V.R. Mohan's brother). Subsequently, the word "brewery" was dropped from the company name in 1982 to remove the impression that the company was engaged only in beer making. New breweries were built during the 1970s and 1980s at Chandigarh, Madras, Nepal, and Kakinada near Hyderabad.

Today, Mohan Meakin's principal brands are Old Monk rum and Golden Eagle beer. Its other products include Diplomat Deluxe, Colonel's Special, Black Knight, Meakin 10,000, Summer Hall and Solan No 1 whiskies, London Dry and Big Ben gins, and Kaplanski vodka. Asia's original beer, Lion, is still sold in northern India.

==== Dutch East Indies ====
In 1929, the Heineken beer company established its first East Indian brewery in Surabaya, East Java, during Dutch colonial rule of Indonesia. Beer was a popular drink among Dutch colonials and Indos in the Dutch East Indies. Brewing was interrupted during World War II Pacific War (1942-1945) and following the Indonesian National Revolution (1945-1949).

By the 1960s, Indonesians had developed their own local brands of beer, including Bintang Beer (nationalized from Heineken) and Anker Beer.

=== Early beer brands ===
Lion Beer is the main brand first sold in the 1840s. It was originally branded an IPA (India Pale Ale) but was changed in the sixties to a lager. Lion remained the number one beer in India for over a century from the 1840s until the 1960s. After this another Mohan Meakin brand, Golden Eagle, took the number one spot until the 1980s, when Kingfisher became number one. By 2001, Lion sales had declined substantially and Lion was only available to the Indian Army through the CSD (Canteen Services Department). Mohan Meakin then entrusted the marketing of their original beer to International Breweries Pvt. Ltd. The brand has since been relaunched in the north Indian market. With a new label design and marketing campaign, Lion has established itself once more in the civilian market and is now expanding into markets across India.

Lion earns a place in history as Asia's first beer brand. Lion's popularity with the British during the heyday of the Empire led to the start-up of other Lion beers around the world, in New Zealand, South Africa and elsewhere. Lion remains the number one brand in neighbouring Sri Lanka where Mohan Meakin had introduced it in the 1880s through their Ceylon brewery.

== Countries ==
=== Bangladesh ===
Bangladesh is a predominantly Muslim country with strict laws regulating the sale of alcohol. In 2004 a local company, Crown Beverages, brewed a product it believed legally circumvented the country's ban on alcohol, producing a malt and hops-based drink that contained less than 5% alcohol. The drinks were marketed as 'Crown' and 'Hunter'. The government subsequently banned their sale, however, Crown Beverages now sell the Hunter beer brand through government-licensed outlets.

=== Brunei ===
Alcohol is banned in Brunei except for sale to foreigners and non-Muslims. There are no breweries in the country.

=== Cambodia ===
There are three main commercial breweries in Cambodia: Carlsberg Cambodia (formerly Cambrew); Heineken Cambodia (formerly Cambodia Breweries); and Khmer Beverages (formerly Khmer Brewery), a subsidiary of the Chip Mong Group. Other breweries in Cambodia include Hanuman Beverages, Kingdom Breweries, Vattanac Brewery, Ganzberg and Mattrid.

==== Carlsberg Cambodia ====
Angkor Beer, named after the iconic Khmer Angkor temples near Siem Reap, is the most widely consumed beer in Cambodia. It is brewed by Cambrew Brewery in Sihanoukville, which also brews Klang Beer, Bayon Beer, Angkor Extra Stout, and Black Panther Premium Stout. Cambrew entered a joint venture with Carlsberg Group in 2005, and has been a wholly owned subsidiary of Carlsberg since 2019.

==== Heineken Cambodia ====
Anchor Beer and Tiger Beer is brewed by Heineken in Prek Aeng, Chbar Ampov district, Phnom Penh. Prior to being absorbed into the HEINEKEN Cambodia in 2020, Cambodia Breweries Limited (CBL) had operated in Cambodia since 1994. Heineken also produces Crown Gold and ABC Stout.

==== Khmer Beverages ====
Cambodia Beer is brewed by Khmer Beverages in Cheung Aek, Dangkao district, Phnom Penh.

==== Craft breweries ====
Kingdom Breweries, an early player in the craft beer industry now provides brewing services for small craft brands throughout south east Asia, especially Thailand, where strict rules block independent brewing. As of 2017, 50% of Kingdom's production was contract brewing.

Various craft and microbreweries have emerged include Riel Brewing and Distilling, Fuzzy Logic, Flowers Nanobrewery in Phnom Penh; Projekt Brews, Notorious Bong in Kampot; and Brew Khnear and Pomme in Siem Reap. The Craft Beer Association of Cambodia (CBAC) actively organises events and competitions.

=== China ===
Beer in China has become increasingly popular in the last century due to the popularity of local and imported brands. Chinese beer has also seen a rise in popularity internationally in the last few decades.

=== India ===
In India, traditional beer has been prepared from rice or millet for thousands of years. In the 18th century, the British introduced European beer to India. Beer is not as popular as stronger alcoholic beverages like whiskey. The most popular beers in India are strong beers.

=== Indonesia ===
Bintang is a locally brewed version of Heineken beer. It is noticeable that Bintang uses similar packaging (650 mL green bottle) and a symbol identical (a red star) to that of Heineken. The name Bintang means "star" in Indonesian.

Bali Hai is not a beer produced on Bali but on Java.

=== Japan ===
Asahi, Kirin, Sapporo, and Suntory are the four major beer producers, mainly producing pale-colored light lagers with an alcohol strength of around five percent ABV.

=== Kyrgyzstan ===
Traditional Kyrgyz drinks like bozo and kymyz retain popularity, and Soviet-style beer lives on in the form of Nasheb. New local brands, e.g. Arpa and Zhivoe brands, have gained popularity and a solid market share. The brewpub Steinbrau in Bishkek brought German-style lagers to the land, which are now widely available. Microbreweries and Craft beer bars have gained in popularity over the last years. Many of the international brands are Russian (Baltika, Sibirskoe Koronna, Klinskoe) or Kazak (Tian-Shan, Karagandinskoe) with several international AB InBev and Heineken N.V. brands available.

=== Laos ===
The Lao Brewery Company (L.B.C.) was established in 1973 as a joint-venture between French investors and Lao businessmen, with beer production commencing in 1973, with a capacity of 3 million litres of beer. Following the foundation of the Lao People's Democratic Republic in December 1975 the brewery was nationalised and became a state-operated enterprise. In 1993 the L.B.C. entered into a joint venture, with 51% foreign investment. In 2002 there was a further change to the brewery's joint venture partners with Carlsberg Asia Company Ltd taking a significant stake in the company. In 2005 Carlsberg increased their stake holding to 50%, with the Lao government holding the balance. L.B.C. currently produces 200 million litres of beer annually and claims a 99% share of the Lao beer market. Beer Lao is the most popular beer in Laos.

=== Malaysia ===
Malaysia's beer market is dominated by Heineken Malaysia Berhad (formerly known as Guinness Anchor Berhad) and Carlsberg Brewery Malaysia Berhad, owning two of Malaysia's three brewing licenses (which are no longer issued by the government).

=== Mongolia ===
Sengur is the most popular beer in Mongolia.

=== Myanmar ===
The dominant brewery in Myanmar, with an approximately 80% share of the market, is Myanmar Brewery, which is 45% owned by Union of Myanmar Economic Holdings Limited. Myanmar Brewery's beers include Myanmar Beer, Double Strong Beer, Andaman Gold (Red) and Andaman Gold (Blue). In 2015 Myanmar Brewery entered into a joint venture with Kirin Brewery to produce and distribute its beers in the country. In 2013 the Carlsberg Group signed an agreement with Myanmar Golden Star, establishing Myanmar Carlsberg Company Ltd. Myanmar Carlsberg Company opened a $75 million brewery in May 2015 which now produces Carlsberg and Turborg locally, together with a new beer, Yoma. In July 2015 Heineken International opened a $60 million brewery in Yangon, in a joint venture with a local company, Alliance Brewery Company. The brewery produces Tiger, Heineken, ABC stout and a new local beer, Regal Seven.

=== Nepal ===
The main commercial brewery in Nepal is the Gorkha Brewery, which was established in 1990 as a joint venture between the Khetan Group and the Carlsberg Group. In 2010 the Carlsberg Group became the majority shareholder. Gorkha Brewery has a 72 percent market share and produces Carlsberg, Tuborg, San Miguel, and Gorkha Beer.

=== North Korea ===
North Korea has at least ten major breweries and many microbreweries that supply a wide range of beer products. The top brand is the light lager Taedonggang which is internationally known for its quality.

The country's problems with goods distribution and power output has forced North Korean brewers to innovate. To minimize distribution, many restaurants and hotels maintain their own microbreweries. Because unreliable power supplies make it difficult to refrigerate beer, North Koreans have developed their own steam beer, an originally American beer brewed in higher than normal temperatures.

Although the Korean liquor soju is preferred, beer comes second when it comes to consumption. Since the 1980s, beer has been within reach of ordinary North Koreans, though it is still rationed. Tourists, on the other hand, enjoy inexpensive beer without such limitations.

=== Pakistan ===
Murree Brewery is the maker of Pakistan's premier beer brand, Murree beer. The brewery was established in 1860 and has two manufacturing units in Rawalpindi and Hattar (Khyber Pakhtunkhwa).

=== Philippines ===
The beer market consists of San Miguel Brewery, the market leader, Asia Brewery, the second brewery and the competitor of San Miguel Brewery, and small microbreweries, including Fat Pauly's in Iligan, Katipunan Craft Ales, Craftpoint and Great Islands Brewing in Manila, Bog's Brewery in Bacolod, Xavierbier brewing in Baguio at the tasting room Baguio Craft Brewery, and Palaweño Brewery in Palawan.

San Miguel's Pale Pilsen is the first and the number one beer in the Philippines. Other leading beers are San Mig Light, a lower calorie version of San Miguel Beer, and Red Horse Beer, the first and the leading extra-strong beer, all brewed by San Miguel.

Asia Brewery, the second brewery in the Philippines, brews Beer Na Beer, and Colt 45 under license.

=== Singapore ===
The Singapore beer market is dominated by Heineken Asia Pacific (formerly Asia Pacific Breweries) and its most popular brand, Tiger Beer, with 28 percent of total sales in 2015.

=== Sri Lanka ===
The most popular local beer is Lion, a lager which is produced by Lion Brewery. Another popular beer was Three Coins produced by McCallum Breweries. In 2012 McCallum was purchased by Miller's Brewery and in mid-2014 Lion Brewery successfully took over Miller's Brewery and closed the plant. The only other brewer still operating in Sri Lanka is Asia Pacific Brewery Lanka Limited, which acquired local brewer, United Brewery, in 2005. Asia Pacific Breweries is a Singaporean-based joint venture between Heineken International and Fraser and Neave.

=== Turkey ===
Beer is a very popular alcoholic beverage in Turkey. Commonly, lager type beers are popular.

=== Turkmenistan ===
ZIP and Berk are the most popular beer in Turkmenistan.

=== Vietnam ===
The three largest companies control 95 percent of the market:

- Sabeco: 51.4 percent in 2010, Saigon Beer, 333, pronounced ba-ba-ba
- Vietnam Brewery Limited: a joint-venture of Asia Pacific Breweries and Saigon Trading Group, 29.7 percent, Heineken, Tiger Beer, Larue Beer
- Habeco: 13.9 percent, Hanoi Beer, Truc Bach Beer

Bia hơi is a unique type of very light draft lager produced locally in small batches. Other beer brands include Hue Beer, Dung Quat Beer, Quy Nhon Beer.

== See also ==
- Beer and breweries by region
