= Intoxicants in Sri Lanka =

Intoxicants in Sri Lanka are legal in certain contexts. One can legally buy most alcohols, tobaccos, and certain herbals (including narcotics such as cannabis and opium) through licensed ayurvedic shops, who are provided the raw materials by the Ministry of Health and then compelled to produce solutions/products that are then sold to the public. It is also possible to purchase tobacco from convenience stores and alcohol from several licensed stores.

The most commonly consumed intoxicants on the island are normally made from tobacco, cannabis, opium, toddy or arrack. The Sunday Times described the underground situation as "...of adulterated arrack, the flourishing moonshine (kasippu) industry that thrives due to the high price of arrack and nowadays, the proliferation of narcotics ranging from heroin to ‘Kerala ganja’ down to toffees laced with intoxicant substances that aim to suck schoolkids into harder drugs."

Females and males both can freely purchase alcohol in Sri Lanka. A ban on alcohol is imposed in Buddhist holy days (Poya).

== Alcohol ==
=== Arrack ===
Sri Lanka is the largest producer of coconut arrack and up until 1992 the government played a significant role in its production. Coconut arrack is traditionally consumed by itself or with ginger beer, a popular soda in Sri Lanka. It also may be mixed in cocktails as a substitute for the required portions of either rum or whiskey. Arrack is often combined with popular mixers such as cola, soda water, and lime juice.

==== Production ====
Other than water, the entire manufacturing process revolves around the fermentation and distillation of a single ingredient, the sap of unopened flowers from a coconut palm (Cocos nucifera). Each morning at dawn, men known as toddy tappers move among the tops of coconut trees using connecting ropes not unlike tightropes. A single tree may contribute up to two litres per day.

Due to its concentrated sugar and yeast content, the captured liquid naturally and immediately ferments into a mildly alcoholic drink called "toddy", tuak, or occasionally "palm wine". Within a few hours after collection, the toddy is poured into large wooden vats, called "wash backs", made from the wood of teak or Berrya cordifolia. The natural fermentation process is allowed to continue in the wash backs until the alcohol content reaches 5-7% and deemed ready for distillation.

Distillation is generally a two-step process involving either pot stills, continuous stills, or a combination of both. The first step results in "low wine", a liquid with an alcohol content between 20 and 40%. The second step results in the final distillate with an alcohol content of 60 to 90%. It is generally distilled to between 33% and 50% alcohol by volume (ABV) or 66 to 100 proof. The entire distillation process is completed within 24 hours. Various blends of coconut arrack diverge in processing, yet the extracted spirit may also be sold raw, repeatedly distilled or filtered, or transferred back into halmilla vats for maturing up to 15 years, depending on flavor, color and fragrance requirements.

Premium blends of arrack add no other ingredients, while the inexpensive and common blends are mixed with neutral spirits before bottling. Most people describe the taste as resembling "…a blend between whiskey and rum", similar, but distinctively different at the same time.

==== Products ====
According to the Alcohol and Drug Information Centre's 2008 report on alcohol in Sri Lanka, the types of arrack are:

- Special arrack, which is produced in the highest volume, nearly doubling in production between 2002 and 2007.
- Molasses arrack is the least-processed kind and considered the common kind. Nevertheless, as a whole, arrack is the most popular local alcoholic beverage consumed in Sri Lanka and produced as a wide variety of brands that fit into the following three categories:
- Premium aged, after distillation, is aged in halmilla vats for up to 15 years to mature and mellow the raw spirit before blending. Premium brands include Ceylon Arrack, VSOA, VX, Vat9, Old Reserve and Extra Special.
- Premium clear is generally not aged, but often distilled and/or filtered multiple times to soften its taste. Premium clear brands include Double Distilled and Blue Label.
- Common is blended with other alcohols produced from molasses or mixed with neutral spirits as filler.

==== Producers ====
Sri Lanka's largest manufacturers, listed in order based on their 2007 annual production of arrack, are:

- DCSL (Distilleries Company of Sri Lanka), 37.25 million litres
- IDL (International Distilleries Ltd), 3.97 million litres
- Rockland Distilleries (Pvt) Ltd, 2.18 million litres
- Mendis, 0.86 million litres

Ceylon Arrack, a brand of Sri Lankan coconut arrack, was launched in the UK in 2010. It is also available in France and Germany. White Lion VSOA entered the American market soon after.

=== Toddy ===
Toddy is a white liquor created from fermenting the sap of the coconut flower. It is considered to be the island's most popular drink and it is often spiced up with onions and chilli. The liquid ferments quickly and must be drunk on the same day that it is tapped. Its sale is limited to local toddy taverns.

==== Production ====
The people who make Toddy are known as "Toddy Tappers".

1. Thalanawa. The flower is beaten for three days.
2. Labu Katey. A container is tied to the plant and the flower is cut, allowing the sap to drain into the container.
3. The sap is fermented to produce Toddy. It can then be mixed with chilli or onions to create a 'masala' style drink.

=== Beer ===
Lion is the most popular beer on the island brewed by Lion Brewery (Ceylon) PLC.The company also produces Carlsberg and Somersby domestically under the license of Carlsberg Group. It can be bought in 4.8% and 8.8%.

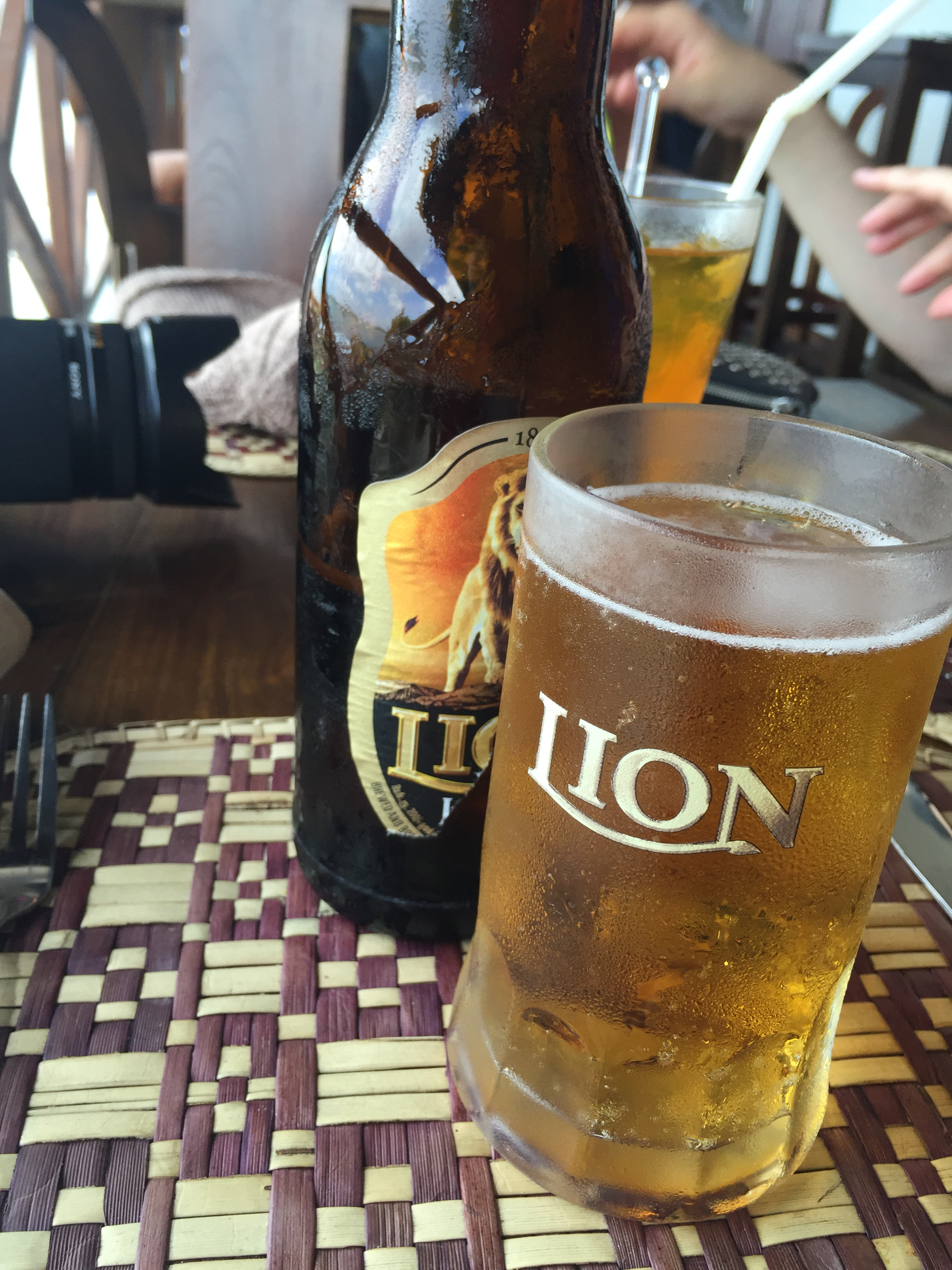
Beer from Lion Brewery, the largest brewer in Sri Lanka

==== History ====
Brewing began in Sri Lanka in 1881 primarily to meet the needs of the colonial tea planters. Despite the country's tropical weather the preferred beer styles have remained relatively unchanged, with strong stouts remaining popular.

==== Market ====
In 2011 Sri Lanka's beer market was estimated to be around 51 million litres per annum, with per capita beer consumption at around 2.7 litres. An increase from 50 million litres and 2.45 litres in 2009. The beer market only represents 39% of the total legitimate alcohol market, the market share, however, is growing compared to the hard liquor segment. In 2011 the beer industry grew by 23 per cent in volumes against 10 per cent growth in the hard liquor segment. Out of the beer consumed in Sri Lanka 90% is manufactured locally with the remainder imported from Asian markets such as Vietnam, Singapore and India. The local beer market is currently occupied by three main brewers.

The largest of Sri Lanka's brewers is the Lion Brewery, which is also the oldest brewery in the country. It produces over 80% of Sri Lanka's beers. In 1988 it constructed a new brewery at Biyagama to replace the century-old facility at Nuwara Eliya. In 1993 the brewery became a subsidiary of Carson Cumberbatch & Co Ltd, and in 1996 the Carlsberg Group acquired a 25% share of the company. The brewery's portfolio includes lagers, strong beers and stouts, notably Lion, Lion Strong and Lion Stout. The company also brews Carlsberg and Guinness under licence. The brewery exports its beers to the U.S., Europe, Japan, Australia and the Maldives.

Sri Lanka's second largest brewer is Asia Pacific Brewery Lanka Limited, which acquired local brewer, United Brewery, in 2005. Asia Pacific Breweries is a Singaporean-based joint venture between Heineken International and Fraser and Neave. It has a brewery in Mawathagama where it produces a range of King beers, including Bison XXtra, Kings Lager, Kings Pilsner and Kings Stout.

The country's third and smallest brewer is the McCallum Brewery, which was established in 1963 in Meegoda. In 2011 the brewery was acquired by Cargills Ceylon PLC. It produces a number of lagers, ales and stouts, notably Three Coins and Sando Stout.

== Herbals ==
=== Cannabis ===
Cannabis is widely consumed in Sri Lanka due to its historic use in traditional medicine and religious festivities. It was also given a boost culturally due to the booming opium trade during colonialism, though nevertheless the product was banned during the latter stages of colonialism and furthermore subject to UN sanctions. It has however remained in use through this period as part of religious/celebratory customs and traditional medicine.

The only legal method for a common person to obtain cannabis is through a licensed traditional medicine shop, and often cannabis will only be sold as part of a mixture/solution containing other herbs. These medicine shops obtain cannabis from the Ministry of Health, mostly sourced from the seizures of illegal cannabis by the police.

==== Legality ====
Cannabis is criminalized under the Poisons, Opium and Dangerous Drugs Ordinance of 1935 but it has been amended several times to allow the medical and scientific use of what it calls 'hemp' for 'galenical' purposes, the latter term translating roughly to the use of herbs to create medicines. It is notable that these 'galenical medicines' include products that can induce euphoria and heightening sexual satisfaction.

Its consumption and sale has further been legalized under the Ayurveda Act, which allows traditional medicine practitioners and herbal shops to legally sell hemp to consumers as long as they have a valid ayurvedic license. The herbal shops are only allowed to obtain hemp through the Ministry of Health, which in turn obtains the drug from the police (seizures of illegally imported drugs) or from government-sanctioned cannabis farms on the island.

==== Use ====
The cannabis infusion Madana Modaka is sold in "petti kades" near schools, and are known to be purchased by school boys for "kicks".

=== Opium ===
Opium is legally allowed to be bought and sold by herbal practitioners as per the Ayurveda Act. The Poisons, Opium and Dangerous Drugs Ordinance of 1935 also allows for the medicinal and scientific use of opium.

=== Tobacco ===
==== Market ====
Ceylon Tobacco Company PLC (CTC) is a Sri Lankan tobacco company engaged in the manufacture, marketing and export of cigarettes. It is a subsidiary of British American Tobacco. CTC is the second largest company traded on the Colombo Stock Exchange. CTC enjoys a virtual monopoly in the manufacture of cigarettes in the country. Cigarette brands marketed by CTC in Sri Lanka include Bristol, Capstan, Dunhill, John Player Gold Leaf, Lucky Strike, Pall Mall and Three Roses.

== Social Issues ==
The island face problems with patrons frequenting illicit moonshine brewers and bootleggers in order to purchase illegal alcohol. This is promoted through prohibitive laws that ban people from purchasing alcohol on many days, and high taxes that make much alcohol legally expensive.

Due to the monopoly on many narcotics, there are concerns that many government officials engage in corruption through the distribution of cannabis and opium by asking for kickbacks, albeit there is not illegality to the sale of cannabis through the Ministry of Health.

== See also ==
- National Medicinal Drugs Policy
