= Beer in Sri Lanka =

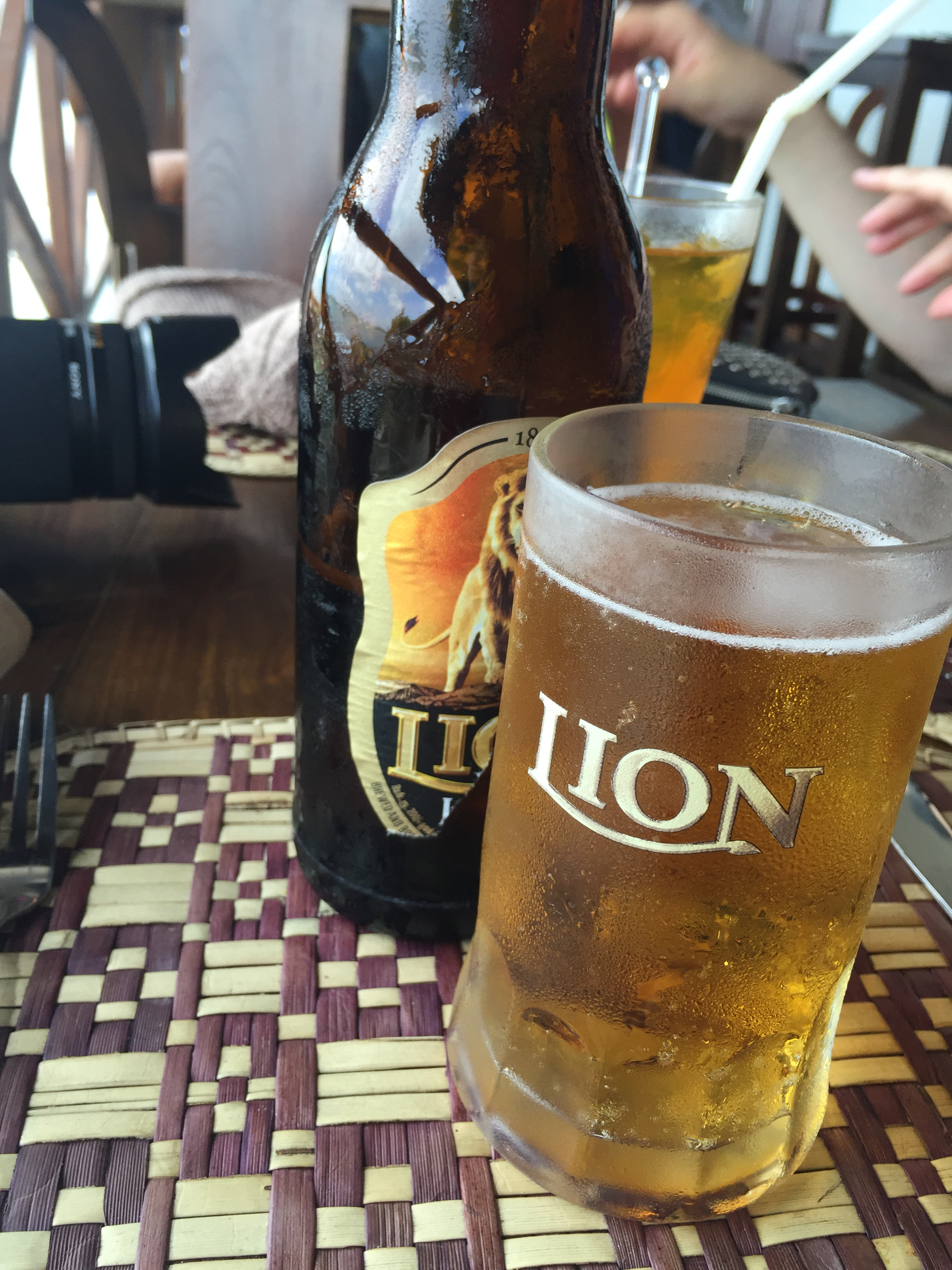
Beer from Lion Brewery, the largest brewer in Sri Lanka

In the 19th century, the British introduced British beer to Ceylon. The most popular beers in Sri Lanka are lager-style beer. The best-selling Sri Lankan beer brand is Lion.

== History ==
Brewing began in Sri Lanka in 1881 primarily to meet the needs of the colonial tea planters. In 2011, Sri Lanka's beer market was estimated to be around 51 million litres per annum, with per capita beer consumption at around 2.7 litres. This was an increase from 50 million litres and 2.45 litres in 2009. The beer market only represents 39% of the total legitimate alcohol market, the market share however is growing compared to the hard liquor segment. In 2011, the beer industry grew by 23 per cent in volume against 10 per cent growth in the hard liquor segment. Out of the beer consumed in Sri Lanka, 90% is manufactured locally with the remainder imported from Asian markets such as Vietnam, Singapore and India. The local beer market is currently occupied by two main brewers.

The largest and oldest of Sri Lanka's brewers is the Lion Brewery. It produces over 90% of Sri Lanka's beer. In 1988 it constructed a new brewery at Biyagama to replace the century-old facility at Nuwara Eliya. In 1993 the brewery became a subsidiary of Carson Cumberbatch & Co Ltd, and in 1996 the Carlsberg Group acquired a 25% share of the company. The brewery's portfolio includes Lion, Lion Strong and Lion Stout, as well as Carlsberg which is brewed under licence. The brewery exports its beers to the U.S., Europe, Japan, Australia and the Maldives. Since 2015, the brewery has produced a number of beers that were previously made by Millers Brewery Ltd, which existed from 1962 to 2015.

Sri Lanka's second largest brewer is Heineken Lanka. It started as United Breweries Lanka in 1997, and was later acquired by Asia Pacific Brewery (Lanka) Limited (the former name of Heineken Lanka) in 2005. The brewery's parent company, Heineken Asia Pacific (formerly known as Asia Pacific Breweries), is a Singaporean-based joint venture between Heineken International and Fraser and Neave. The brewery, located in Mawathagama, produces a range of medium and high-strength beers, including Bison Gold Blend, Tiger Lager, Tiger Black, Anchor Smooth and Anchor Strong.

Another locally brewed brewer is McCallum Breweries, owned by Cargills Ceylon, which brews Three Coins Beer among others.

== Sales and consumption ==
In 2017 the beer market in Sri Lanka grew by 24-25%. According to the Finance Ministry, during the first eight months of 2017, revenue from excise duty on liquor and cigarettes has significantly decreased by 5.9% to LKR 73.7 billion and by 8.1% to LKR 54.6 billion, due to a drop in the volume of sales.

Beer Sales (million USD)
Year	Alcoholic Beer	Non-alcoholic beer	Total
2022	247.6	63.42	311.02
2021	230.3	49.63	279.93
2020	251.8	52.84	303.64
2019	278.7	54.56	333.26
2018	285.7	50.47	336.17
2017	279.8	44.48	324.28
2016	265.1	40.64	305.74
2015	252.7	34.55	287.25
2014	239.6	31.39	270.99

== Consumption statistics ==
Beer consumption Sri Lanka per capita 2010–2020 (Litres)
Year	Beer consumption per capita (in Litres)
2020	5.5
2019	7.3
2018	7.1
2017	6.8
2016	6.6
2015	6.5
2014	6.1
2013	5.9
2012	5.8
2011	5.4
2010	4.9

== See also ==
- Beer in Asia
- Beer and Breweries in Sri Lanka
