= Beer in Vietnam =

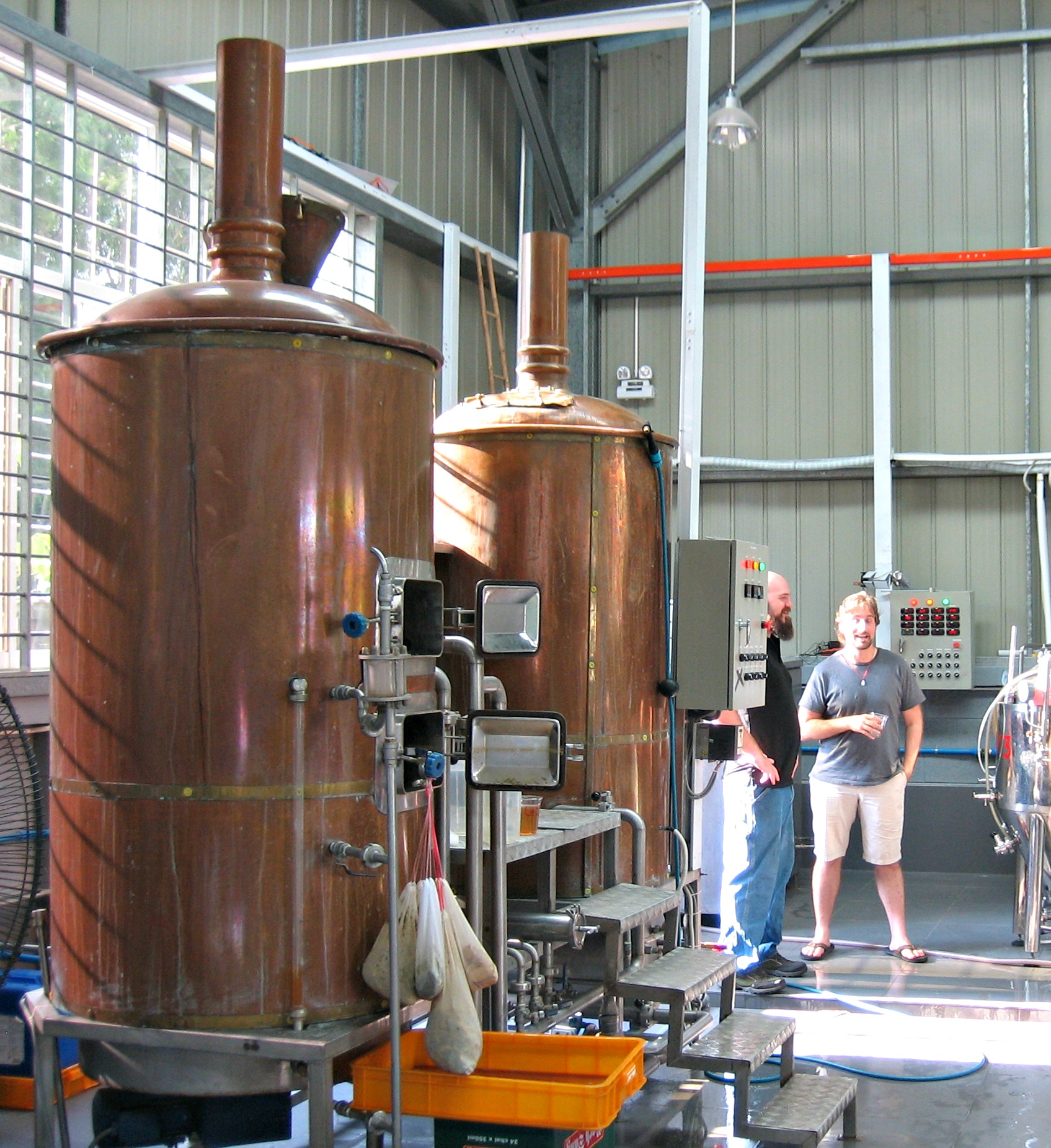
Pasteur Street Brewing Company

Vietnam has an established beer culture that emerged during French colonisation. Beer in Vietnamese is bia, borrowed from French bière. Some beer brands or beer types that are popular in Vietnam include Bia Saigon, Bia Hanoi, bia hơi, Heineken beer, and Tiger Beer.

== Macro breweries ==
Vietnam's beer market is fragmented, with a range of breweries controlling different market segments in different areas of the country.

According to 2023 statistics, the most dominant with 43% market share is Heineken N.V. (producing their eponymous beer Heineken, Tiger Beer and historic domestic brand Larue) Sabeco Brewery (producing a portfolio of lagers as Bia Saigon range and 333 Beer), Carlsberg Group (which is best known for Huda Beer), and Habeco (based in the north of Vietnam, producing Hanoi Beer), control 33.9%, 9.2% and 7.5% of the national beer market respectively.

Despite being one of its most popular markets, Heineken delayed launching their non-alcoholic "Heineken 0.0" beer for four years in Vietnam, launching it with a major marketing campaign in early 2020.

Vietnam's beer output increased from 3.4 billion litres in 2015 to 4.4 billion litres in 2019.

Of note, post-COVID Vietnam’s beer industry has struggled. Whereas beer sales reached US$7.6 billion in 2019 they fell to US$5.7 billion in 2020 and US$4.6 billion in 2021. This has been attributed to stricter enforcement of drink-driving laws, an increase in beer imports, and a general change in consumer behaviour since the pandemic.

== Imported beers ==
Vietnam imports beers from various countries. Belgian bottled beers include Trappiste, Chimay, Leffe, Hoegaarden. Some examples of German/Austrian bottled beers that Vietnam imports include Münchner Hofbräu, Warsteiner, Paulaner, Bitburger, Edelweiss, and Köstritzer. Beers from Russia and the Czech Republic are also imported to Vietnam.

== Microbreweries and craft beer ==
Vietnam's craft beer scene is rapidly growing: out of 98 active breweries in Vietnam, the majority are independently owned microbreweries.

A range of smaller microbreweries were formed in the 1990s, as Vietnamese studying or working abroad returned with enthusiasm for European beer styles like Czech pilsners and German wheat beers.

The second wave of microbreweries emerged in the mid 2010s. The first to launch commercially was Platinum, a Ho Chi Minh City based brewery producing Australian styles of ales. Since then, a range of other craft breweries have launched who now produce commercial quantities and distribute both domestically and internationally.

Notable examples of Vietnamese breweries that have expanded onto the international stage include Pasteur Street Brewing Company (which operates a nationwide chain of taprooms), Heart of Darkness (which is among the most active exporters to countries like Hong Kong and Singapore), and East West Brewing Company.

Other notable breweries around Vietnam include 7 Bridges Brewing (Danang and Hanoi), Furbrew (Hanoi), Turtle Lake Brewing Company (Hanoi) and Winking Seal (Ho Chi Minh City).

== Gallery ==
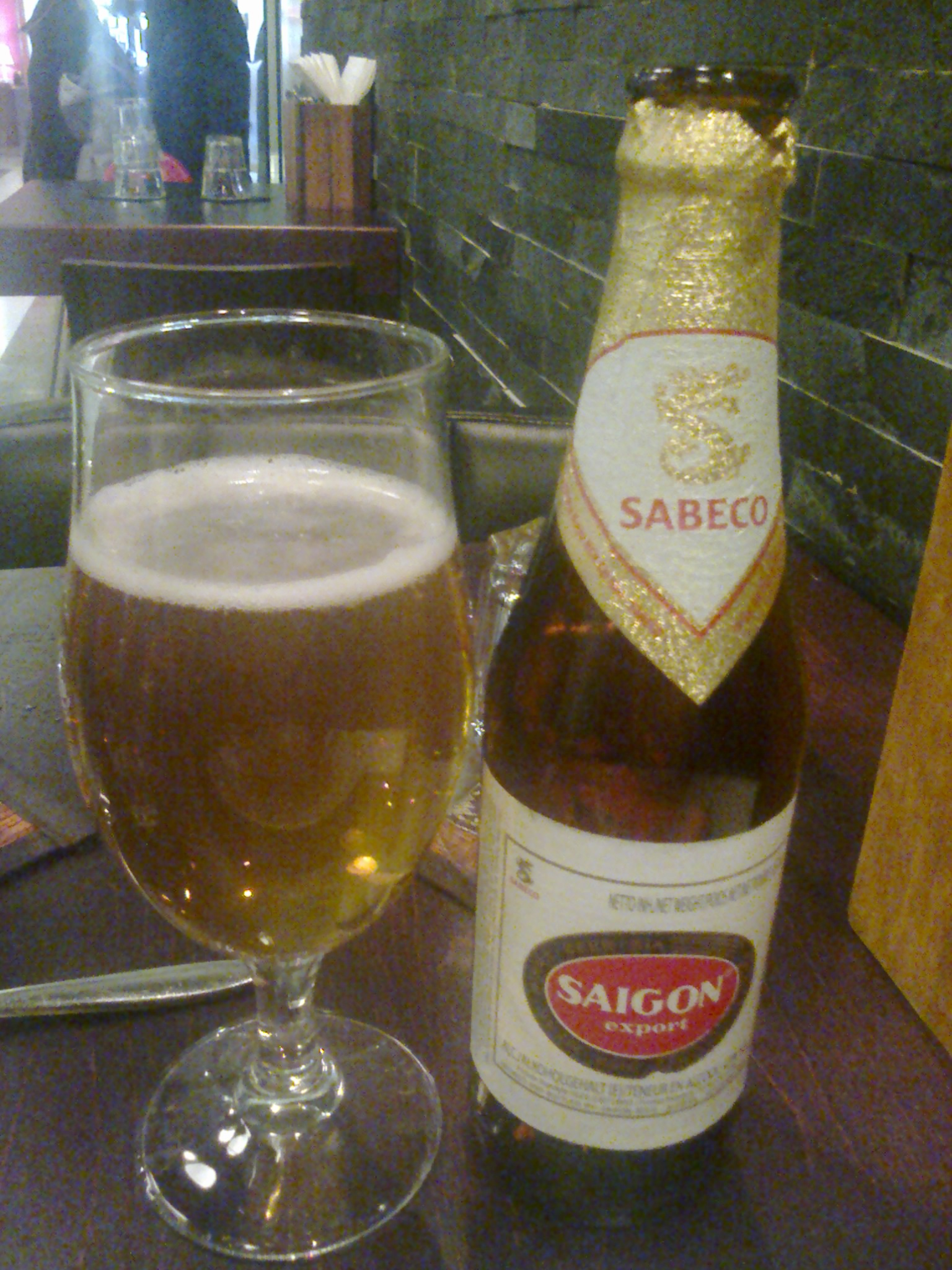
Saigon Export

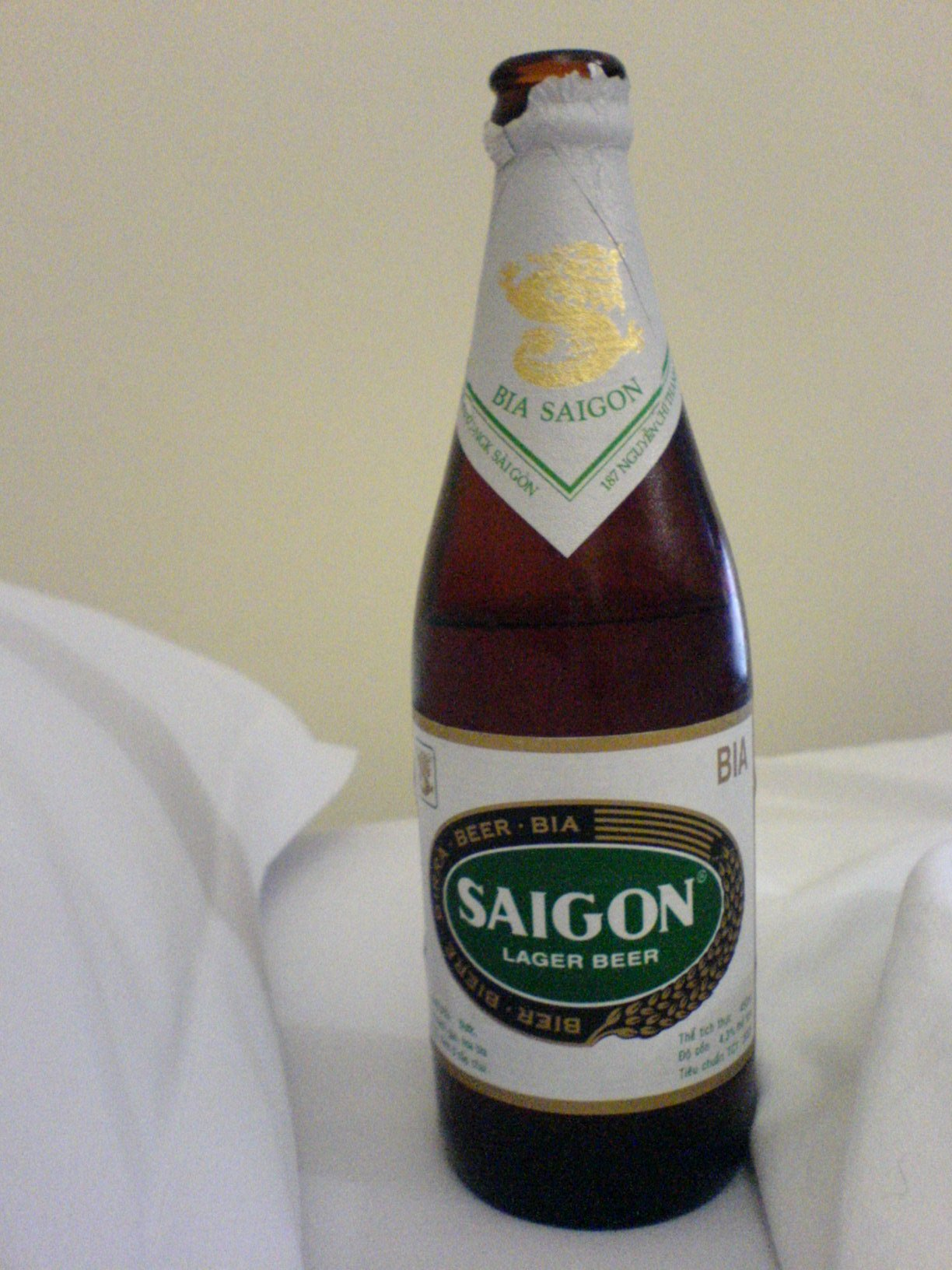
Saigon Lager

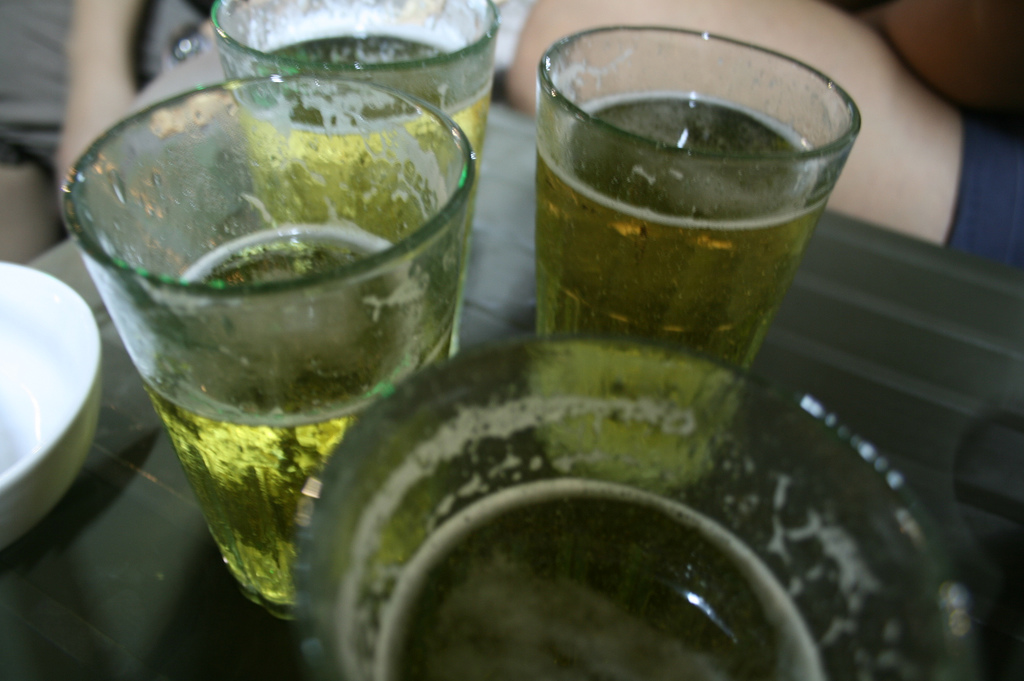
Bia hơi
