= 333 Premium Export Beer =

Beer brewed in Vietnam

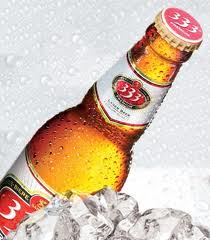
- Type: Lager
- Manufacturer: Sabeco Brewery
- Origin: Vietnam
- Introduced: 1875
- Alcohol by volume: 5.3%
- Ingredients: Water, barley, cereal, hops
- Website: Home page

333 Premium Export Beer, simply 333 and formerly 33 Beer is a beer brewed in Vietnam. It is now made by Sabeco Brewery.

33 Beer was the original name of this Vietnamese beer, pronounced "Ba mươi ba" in Vietnamese, which means "thirty-three. It was well known among American GIs during the war in Vietnam in the 1960s and 1970s.

== History ==
In 1975, when South Vietnam fell to the North Vietnamese, the communist government changed the name of the beer to "333 Premium Export Beer" in order to distance itself from its colonial origins. It was prepared as a rice beer.

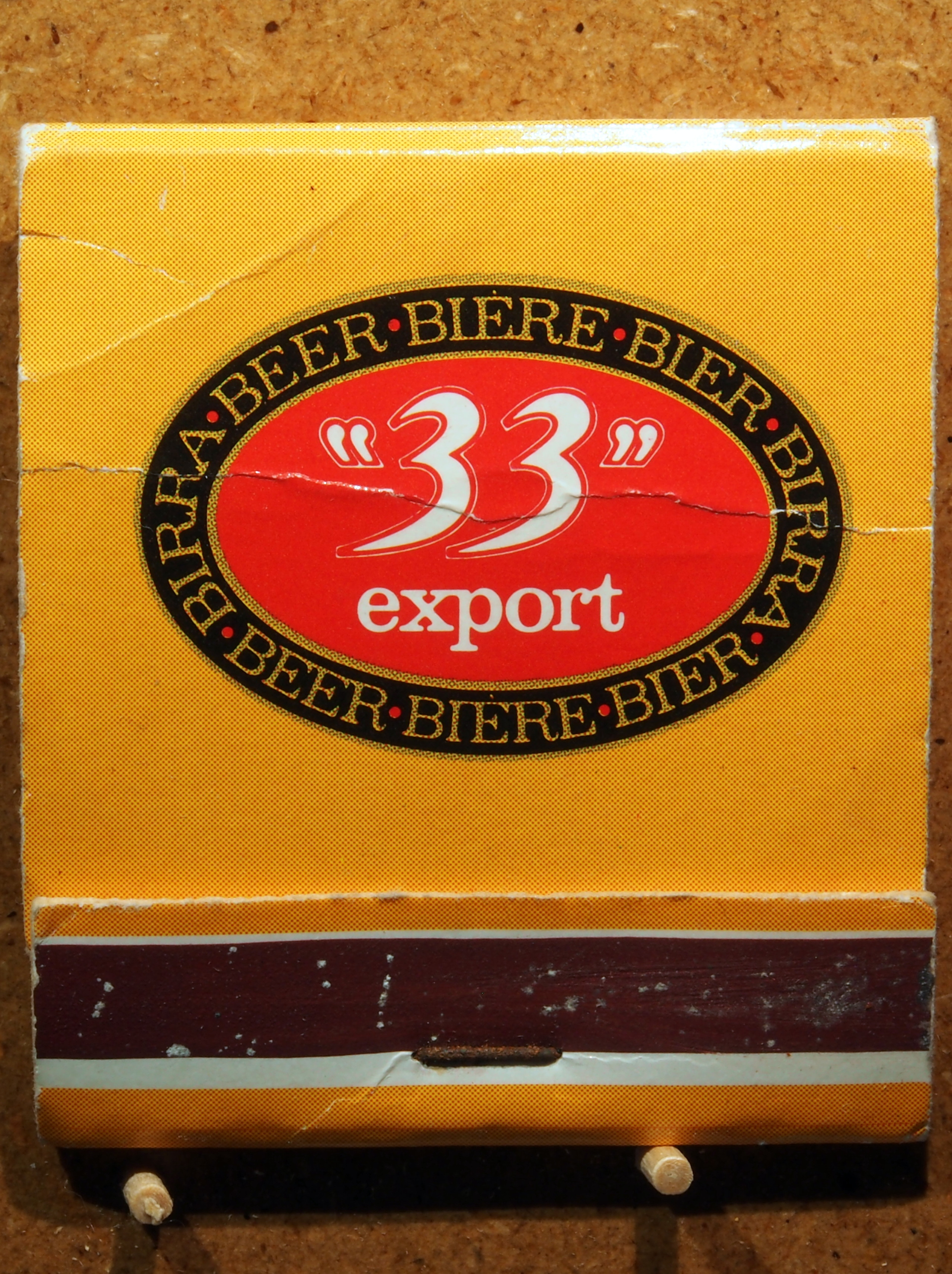
A matchbook advertising 33 Beer from the European Beer Museum

33 Beer's name was derived from its original 33-centilitre (11.2 ounce) bottles from the early 1900s.

33 Beer originated in France using a German recipe and ingredients. It acquired the German label 33 at the turn of the century. Production later moved to Saigon (now Ho Chi Minh City) and it became one of the leading beers in Vietnam. It was popular among American GIs during the Vietnam War. 333 Premium Export Beer became available in the American market after the two countries normalized relations in 1994. It is also available in Canada, Hong Kong, Japan, Singapore and Australia.

== See also ==
- Beer in Vietnam
- Bia hơi
- Habeco
- Hanoi Beer
- Huda Beer
- Huế Beer
- Sabeco Brewery
