= Agro =

Agro may refer to:

- Agro, a shortened form of agronomy or agriculture

== People with the surname ==
- Thomas Agro, New York gangster
- Vince Agro, Canadian politician

== Places ==
- Agro Park, a Malaysian park formally known as Malaysia Agro Exposition Park Serdang
- Agro Pontino, the Pontine Marshes of central Italy
- Agro Romano, Latin for the Ager Romanus, agricultural areas surrounding Rome

== Organizations ==
- Agro Bank Malaysia
- Agro Bukit
- Agro ParisTech, a French university-level institution in life sciences and agronomy
- Bloom Agro, an Indonesian social enterprise for sustainable agriculture
- Bumitama Gunajaya Agro, a palm oil company in Jakarta
- Danish Agro, a cooperative farm supply company in Denmark
- National Bio and Agro-Defense Facility (NBAF), United States government-run animal disease research facility

== Entertainment ==
- Agro, the name of the main character's horse from the videogame Shadow of the Colossus
- Agro (puppet), an Australian puppet and media personality
  - Agro's Cartoon Connection, an Australian children's television show

== Other uses ==
- Agrobacterium, a genus of bacteria
- AGRO (exhibition), a Ukrainian exhibition for agriculture
- Agro-terrorism
- Agro-town, a residential agglomeration in a rural environment
- Agro, a computer gaming concept also known as Hate (MMORPG terminology)
- John Agro Special Teams Award, named after the first legal counsel for the Canadian Football League Players Association

== See also ==
- Aggro (disambiguation)
