= Siam Cement Group =

Thai building materials manufacturer

The Siam Cement Pcl. (Siam Cement Group) ปูนซิเมนต์ไทย
- Type: Public
- Traded as: SET: SCC
- ISIN: TH0003010Z04
- Industry: Conglomerate
- Founded: 8 December 1913; 112 years ago Bangkok, Siam
- Founder: Vajiravudh, King Rama VI
- Headquarters: Bang Sue, Bangkok, Thailand
- Key people: Air Chief Marshal Satitpong Sukvimol (Chairman), Roongrote Rangsiyopash (CEO)
- Products: cement, chemicals, construction, packaging, solar roof, investment, logistics
- Revenue: ▼399.9 billion baht (2020)
- Net income: ▲34.1 billion baht (2020)
- Total assets: ▲749.3 billion baht (2020)
- Number of employees: 53,728
- Divisions: Cement-Building Materials Business; Chemicals Business; Packaging Business
- Website: www.scg.com

The Siam Cement Public Company Limited (SCG; SET: SCC) is the largest and oldest cement and building material company in Thailand and Southeast Asia. In 2016, SCG was also ranked as the second largest company in Thailand and the 604th largest public company in the world by Forbes. The company is SET50 and SETHD-listed and an industry benchmark. The company's major shareholder is King Vajiralongkorn, which owns 30 percent of Siam Cement's shares.

Consolidated revenues were 450 billion baht (US$14 billion) in FY2017. The cement and building materials unit contributed 38 percent; 44 percent from the chemicals unit; and 18 percent from the packaging unit. In 2016, SCG was ranked No.1 of the top graduate employer in Thailand polled by Asia Internship Program.

SCG was founded to set up the first cement plant in Bangkok, Thailand by a royal decree of King Rama VI (Vajiravudh) in 1913. Since then, the company has expanded into various businesses with three core business units: SCG Cement-building materials; SCG Chemicals; and SCG Packaging. Now, SCG heavily invests their company into Southeast Asia regions including packaging businesses in Malaysia, a petrochemical complex in Vietnam, and many cement plants around the regions.

SCG employs approximately 54,000 employees. The products are marketed domestically and exported to all regions of the world. Cementhai Holding Co., Ltd. oversees SCG's investment in various businesses. Most are joint ventures with international companies, for example, Kubota, Yamato Kogyo, Aisin Takaoka Group, Nippon Steel, Toyota Motor, Michelin, Hayes Lemmerz, Siam Mitsui, and Dow Chemical company.

=== Investment into Chip Mong Cambodia ===
Siam Cement Group announced in 2015 that it acquired a 40% stake in Cambodia Mega conglomerate Chip Mong INSEE Cement, making it the largest single shareholder in Chip Mong.

== Research and development ==
SCG emphasizes research and development. In 2016, R&D spending was one percent of sales and value-added products contributed more than 35 percent of sales. In 2017, HVA products accounted for nearly 40 percent of sales.

Siam Research and Innovation Company Limited conducts research and development of new products and services related to cement, mortar, concrete, building materials, 3D printing, prefabrication, recycled aggregate, and refractory.

In 2014, SCG Chemicals acquired 51 percent of Norner for developing plastic and polymer technology. In 2017, SCG received the "Asia IP Elite 2016" award for the third consecutive year. The award is given by Intellectual Asset Management (IAM), a leading magazine in strategic management of intellectual property.

== Sponsorship ==
The Siam Cement Group is sponsor of football, badminton, and golf events in Thailand and Southeast Asia.
