= Aggro =

Aggro is a slang term meaning aggravation or aggression. "Aggro" may also refer to:

== In music ==
- The Aggrolites, a "dirty" reggae band from Los Angeles, California
- "A.G.G.R.O", a song by The Aggrolites
- "Aggro", a 2007 song by Paul Hartnoll from his album, The Ideal Condition
- Aggro Santos, a Brazilian-English rapper
- "Aggro", a 2007 song by The Enemy from their album, We'll Live and Die in These Towns
- Aggro Berlin, a German hip hop label
- Aggro-Phobia, a 1976 album by Suzi Quatro
- Aggrotech, a music genre
- "Pirate Aggro", a 1987 song by The Housemartins
- "A Taste of Aggro", a 1978 song by The Barron Knights

== Other uses ==
- Aggro, one of the Magic: The Gathering deck types and applicable to other collectible card games
- Aggro Crag (later Super Aggro Crag), a mountain from the TV show Nickelodeon GUTS
- The Aggro Dome, a building in Mega-City One, a fictional city in the Judge Dredd comic books
- Aggro, hate or threat, a mechanism used in video game AI to determine the target prioritization of computer-controlled characters
- Aggro, a system used in Army of Two and Army of Two: The 40th Day
- Aggro-Kick, a move used in Tony Hawk's Proving Ground to gain speed during regular forward skating

== See also ==
- Agro (disambiguation)
