= AGRO (exhibition) =

Annual agriculture exhibition in Kyiv, Ukraine

- Status: Active
- Genre: International Exhibition for Agriculture, Agricultural Machinery, Livestock Farming, Food Industry, and the Renewable and Alternative Energy Sector
- Venue: National Complex "Expocentre of Ukraine"
- Location: Kyiv
- Country: Ukraine
- Inaugurated: 1988
- Attendance: 186,000 combined (2019)
- Organizer: Ministry of Agrarian Policy and Food of Ukraine, AgroExpo
- Website: http://www.agro-expo.com

AGRO (Russian: and Ukrainian: АГРО) is the largest Ukrainian exhibition for agriculture, agricultural machinery, livestock farming and the food industry. The event is staged annually in Kyiv and in one of the main industries in Ukraine.

== History ==
The inaugural AGRO was staged in Kyiv in 1988. In 2018, the event featured some 1,308 exhibitors and 185,000 visitors attended the show over the course of four days. More than 34,000 sq.m of exhibition area outdoors and in 10 halls was covered the same year. 57 business events like conferences, seminars and presentations were held during AGRO 2018. The event was held at the National Complex "Expocentre of Ukraine" in Kyiv. In 2017 the event was organized by the Ministry of Agrarian Policy and Food of Ukraine for the 30th time, official pavilions were organized from the United States of America and the People's Republic of China. AGRO includes the trade fairs ExpoAgroTech, AnimalExpo, PlantGrowing & AgriculturalChemistry, BioFuel, EquiWorld, FishExpo, Hi-Tech AGRO, AGRO BuildExpo and Organic.

== AGRO 2020 ==
The 32nd International Exhibition AGRO 2020 is postponed to August 11 to 14, 2020.

== See also ==
Ukrainian wine
