= DCSL Breweries Lanka =

- Industry: Alcoholic beverage
- Predecessor: United Breweries Ltd; Asia Pacific Brewery (Lanka) Limited; Heineken Lanka Limited
- Founded: 1998; 28 years ago
- Headquarters: Mawathagama, Sri Lanka
- Area served: Sri Lanka
- Products: Beer
- Parent: Distilleries Company of Sri Lanka
- Website: dblanka.com

DCSL Breweries Lanka (formerly Asia Pacific Brewery (Lanka) Limited (APB Lanka) and Heineken Lanka Limited) is the second largest brewer in Sri Lanka.

== History ==
United Breweries Limited was established as a joint venture between Mauritius Breweries Limited Offshore, a wholly owned subsidiary of Phoenix Beverages Limited (a leading beverage group from Mauritius), the A.P. Casie Chitty Company Limited and Hilary Company Limited in 1997.

The construction of the company's Rs 550 million brewery in Mawathagama commenced in early 1997 and was completed in 1998, with an annual production capacity of 120,000 hectolitres.

In September 2005 Asia Pacific Breweries acquired a 60% stake in United Brewery, partnering with the Sri Lankan-based Anandappa family group (20%) and MBL Offshore Limited (20%). Asia Pacific Breweries is a Singaporean-based joint venture between Heineken International and Fraser and Neave. The company was subsequently renamed Asia Pacific Brewery Lanka Limited.

In February 2017 the company changed its name again to Heineken Lanka Limited to reflect its relationship with the Heineken Group. The Heineken Group having acquired full control of Asia Pacific Breweries Ltd in 2012 and re branding it as Heineken Asia Pacific in 2013.

After purchase deal between Heineken Asia Pacific and Distilleries Company of Sri Lanka in January 2024 DSCL acquired all shares of Heineken Lanka Limited and the trademark for production and distribution of Heineken in Sri Lanka.

== Products ==
APB Lanka produces a range of King beers, including King's Lager, King's Pilsner, King's Stout and Bison Super Strong (Bison XXtra), as well as Anchor, ABC Stout and Baron's Strong Brew.

== See also ==
- Beer in Sri Lanka
