= Lion Brewery (Sri Lanka) =

Sri Lankan Brewery Company

Lion Brewery (Ceylon) PLC
- Type: Public
- Traded as: CSE: LION.N0000
- ISIN: LK0291N00001
- Industry: Alcoholic beverage
- Predecessor: Ceylon Brewery Limited
- Founded: 1881; 145 years ago
- Headquarters: Biyagama, Sri Lanka
- Key people: Amal Cabraal (Chairman); R. H. Meewakkala (CEO)
- Products: Beer
- Revenue: ▲LKR58.571 billion (2022)
- Operating income: ▲LKR5.273 billion (2022)
- Net income: ▲LKR3.668 billion (2022)
- Total assets: ▲LKR41.067 billion (2022)
- Total equity: ▲LKR19.928 billion (2022)
- Owners: Ceylon Beverage Holdings (52.25%); Carlsberg Group (25%); Carson Cumberbatch (8.33%); Allan Gray (6.78)
- Number of employees: ▲263 (2022)
- Parent: Ceylon Beverage Holdings PLC
- Website: www.lionbeer.com

Lion Brewery or Lion Brewery (Ceylon) PLC is a predominantly Sri Lankan owned and operated brewery. The company is listed on the Colombo Stock Exchange and its stock is part of the S&P Sri Lanka 20 Index. Lion Brewery produces the highest selling beer, Lion Lager, in both Sri Lanka and the Maldives.

== History ==
The Ceylon Brewery was the first brewery established in Sri Lanka. It was established in 1849 by Sir Samuel Baker (1821–93) as a cottage industry, catering for the British colonial tea plantations in the hill country retreat of Nuwara Eliya. Nuwara Eliya was the ideal location for a brewery, with its cool climate and natural spring water. It wasn't however until 1881 that it began brewing on a commercial basis, with the Ceylon Brewery Company, managed by Messrs Bremer and Pa Bavary.

In 1884, the brewery was taken over by the Mohan Meakin Brewery of India, who were already producing asia's first beer brand in India, Lion beer, which they started to produce in Sri Lanka too, it is still produced here and remains popular in Sri Lanka. Mohan Meakin later sold out to Ceylon Brewery, In 1911, the brewery was acquired by G. W. Lindsay White and received limited liability company status, as the Ceylon Brewery Limited. In 1921, brewery was extensively rebuilt with the establishment of several new producing plants.

In the 1930s and 1940s the brewery was managed by Arthur Wood-Hobley and in 1948 the company opened an office in Colombo. In the 1950s the company expanded its product range under the management of John Bagshawe Hampson introducing Lion Lager, Lion Pale Ale, Sinha Pilsner and Lion Stout. In 1950, the company introduced canned beer to the Sri Lankan market but this was later withdrawn due to lack of demand. In 1962 it launched the Jubilee Ale (in celebration of the company's golden jubilee), which received a gold medal at the Monde Selection and gained second place at the Brewers and Allied Exhibition in London. In 1982, it released the Royal Pilsner, commemorating Queen Elizabeth II's visit to Sri Lanka, replacing the Sinha Pilsner.

In 1993, the Ceylon Brewery became a subsidiary of Carson Cumberbatch & Co Ltd, a diversified group of Sri Lankan businesses. In 1996 the Carlsberg Group acquired a 25% share in Ceylon Brewery and the company was subsequently renamed Lion Brewery, with Ceylon Brewery remaining as a holding company.

In 1998, Lion Brewery established a new 300,000 hL/yr capacity brewery in Biyagama, just outside the capital Colombo, with the Nuwara Eliya operations closing in July 2001. The capacity of the Biyagama brewery has subsequently been increased to 750,000 hL/yr. It is the market leader in Sri Lanka with an 82% market share. Lion is currently exported to the United States, Canada, the UK, Japan, Australia, Africa and the Maldives. In the Maldives it has a dominant market share. It also operates a joint venture with the Carlsberg Group, South Asia Breweries Ltd, with four breweries in India, including one each in Maharashtra, Rajasthan, Himachal and Kolkata.

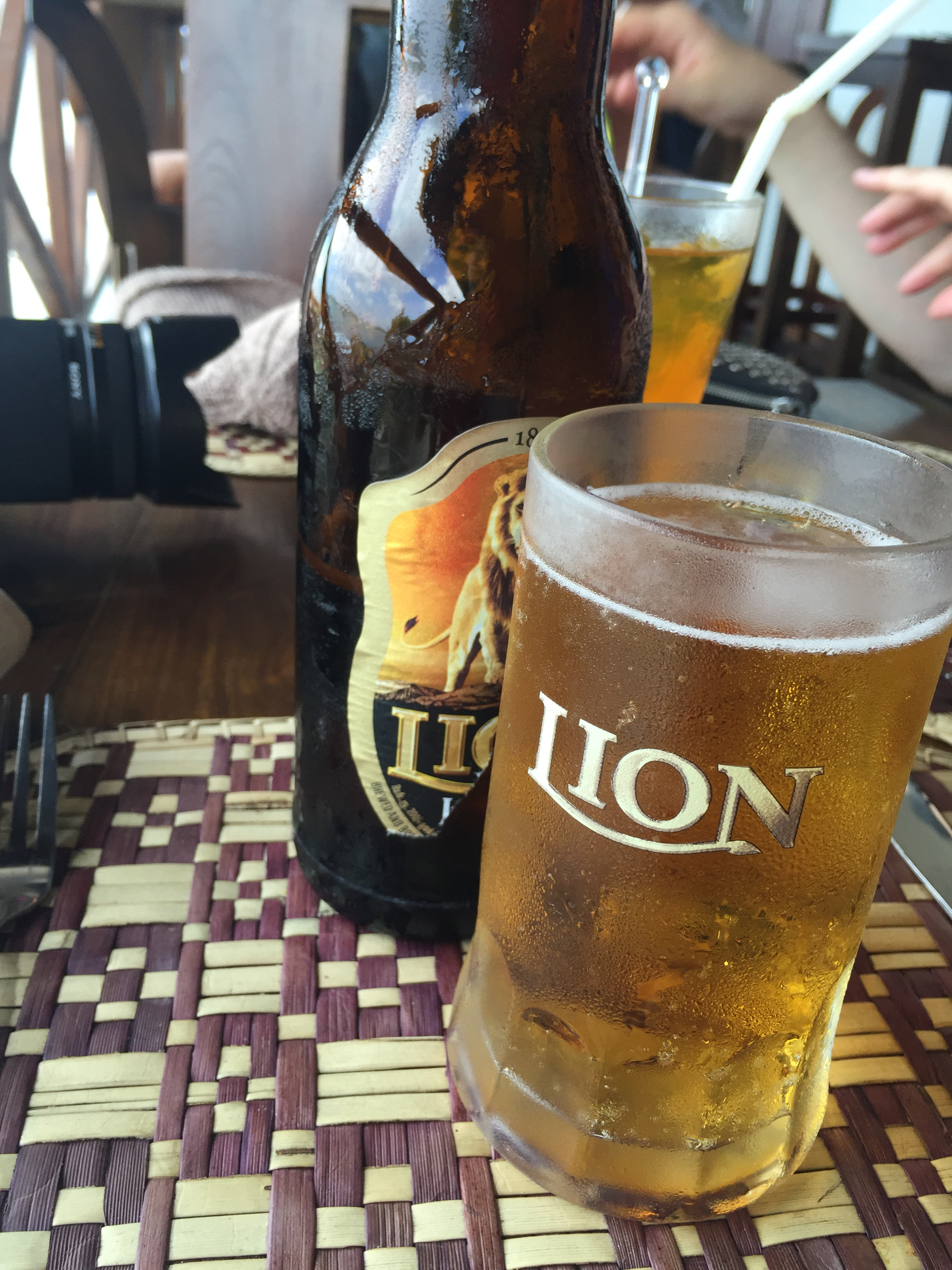

In 2011, Grupo Modelo appointed Lion Brewery as the national distributor of Corona in Sri Lanka and the Maldives.

In 2012, the company was appointed the sole importer and distributor of Diageo, as well Moët Hennessy, whose brands include Guinness, Johnny Walker, Smirnoff, J & B, Hennessy, Moët & Chandon and Dom Perignon.

In November 2014, Lion Brewery and its subsidiary Pearl Springs (Private) Limited purchased Millers Brewery, transferring production of the Millers brands, including Three Coins, to its facility in Biyagama.

== Varieties ==
- Lion Lager - 4.8% ABV premium lager - Gold medal 2011 & 2012 Monde Selection
- Lion Stout - 8.8% ABV stout, brewed from British, Czech and Danish malts with Styrian hops and an English yeast strain - Gold medal 1990–94, 2006, 2011-13 Monde Selection; Gold medal 2005 & 2012 World Beer Festival; Gold medal 2005 World Beer Championship; 2006 Gold medal International Beer Summit
- Lion Strong - 8.8% ABV pale lager/imperial pils - Gold medal 2012 Monde Selection
- Lion Ice - 4.2 % ABV pale lager

Lion Brewery has also brewed Carlsberg and Carlsberg Special Brew under license from the Carlsberg Group since 1993. It has also brewed Guinness under licence since 2021.

- Lion Extra Strong - 12% Strong beer (Export only) - Monde Selection Gold Award 2020
- Lion Truebone - 8.8% ABV lager
- GB Export - 8.8% ABV lager
- Ryder's Wild Apple - 8.8% Flavoured Beer
- Ryder’s Ginger Blast - 8.8% Flavoured Beer

== See also ==
- Beer in Sri Lanka
