= Cambrew Brewery =

Cambodian brewery and beverage company

Coordinates: 10.6329°N 103.5345°E

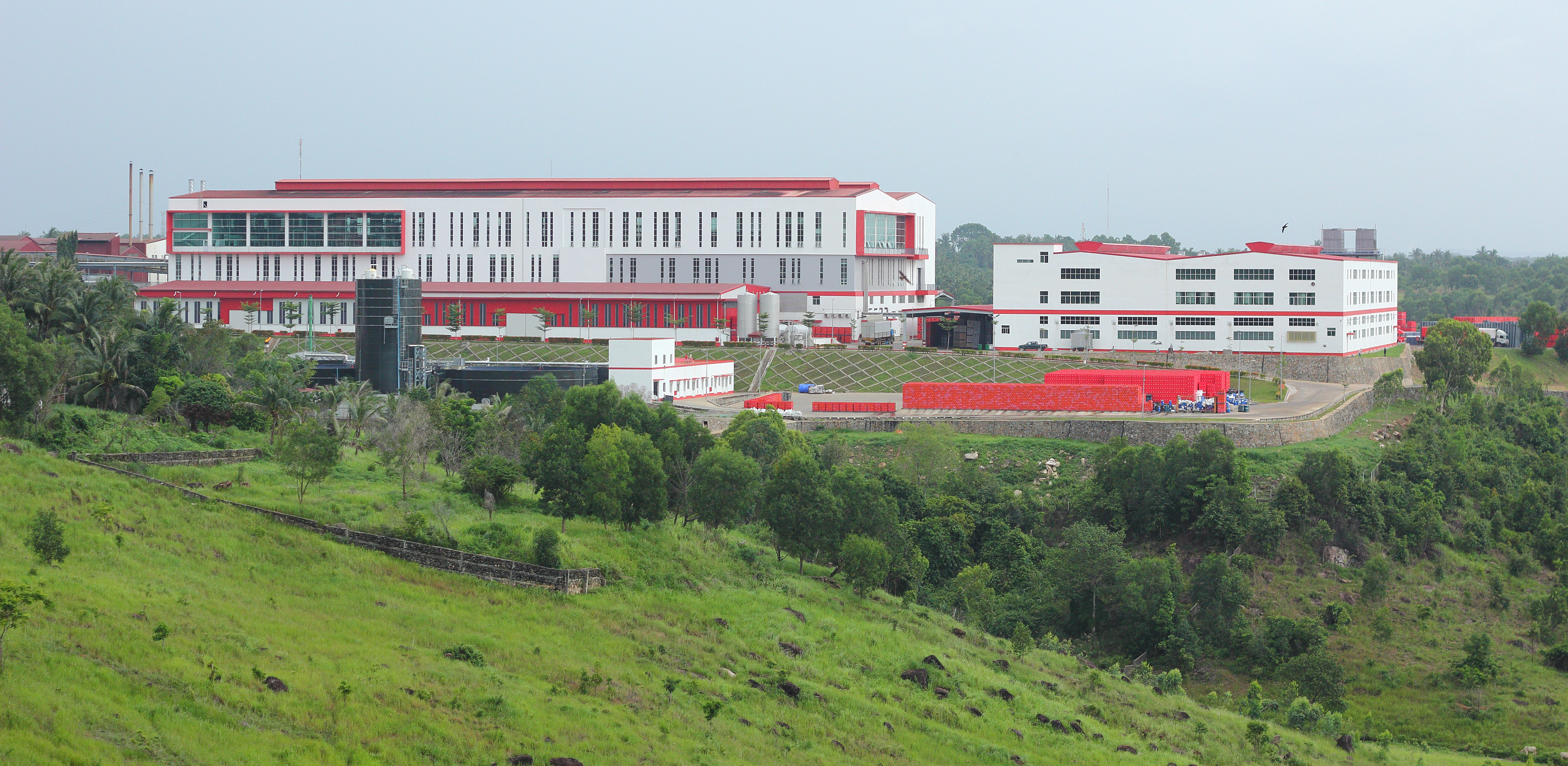
- Industry: Alcoholic beverage
- Predecessor: SKD Brewery
- Founded: 1965
- Headquarters: Sihanoukville, Cambodia
- Products: Beer
- Owner: Carlsberg Group
- Website: Official website

Cambrew Brewery, (Khmer: ខេមប្រ៊ូរ), also known as Carlsberg - Cambodia, is the largest brewery in Cambodia, situated in Sihanoukville. The brewery produces Angkor Beer (the most widely consumed beer in the country and acknowledged as Cambodia's national beer), Klang Beer, Bayon Beer, Angkor Extra Stout and Black Panther Premium Stout.

== History ==
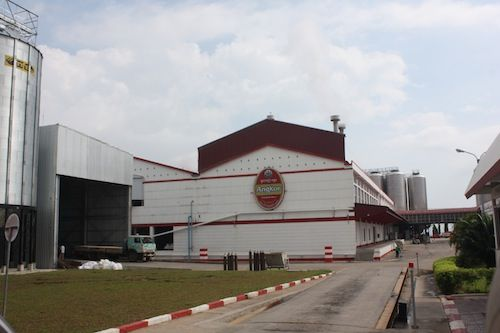
Cambrew Brewery factory in Sihanoukville, Cambodia

An earlier brewing company, known as SKD Brewery (Société des Khmere Distilleries) was commissioned by the Cambodian government in the early 1960s and built by a French contractor with technical assistance from France. The brewery was officially opened by HRH Prince Sihanouk in 1965. The brewery building was designed by Cambodian architect Vann Molyvann during the 'golden period' of New Khmer Architecture. The main office building follows the distinctive 'dong raik' architectural design form in which the upper floor overhangs the ground floor by several metres, highlighted and reflected in the shape of the distinctive triangle supports in the facade. Sihanoukville was chosen as the site for the brewery for the quality of the local water which supposedly had the ideal mineral content for brewing beer. The choice of Sihanoukville was not without controversy at the time due to the distance from the bottle manufacturing plant near Phnom Penh. The brewery produced lager beer, marketed under the brand names Angkor Beer and Bayon Beer. The brewery's operations were disrupted when civil war broke out in the early 1970s and it closed in 1975.

In 1991, Cambrew Ltd (a Malaysian company) assumed control of the brewery and after nine months of refurbishment, the brewery recommenced production in 1992. In 1992, Cambrew entered into a joint venture with PepsiCo for bottling and distribution of soft drinks in Cambodia.

In 2005, the Carlsberg Group purchased a 50% holding in the brewery. Six years later, in 2011, the Angkor Extra Stout was awarded the Grand Gold award from Monde Selection of Belgium. Angkor Premium Beer won the Gold Medal at the Monde Selection in 2013.

In 2018, Carlsberg increased its stake in the brewery to 75%. A year later, on 1 November 2019, Carlsberg acquired full ownership of the brewery.

In an investigation published by Danwatch, allegations were made about Carlsberg’s operations in Cambodia. It said that young women selling beer were discouraged from taking part in trade union activities. The report included accounts from workers who said they lost days off, were given short-term contracts, and feared losing their jobs. According to trade union activist Chheng Kimyan, women who joined a union could lose their jobs or face pressure from their managers. Danwatch also described wider problems in this part of the market, including low pay, sexual harassment from customers, and insecure employment. In a response quoted by Danwatch, Carlsberg said it does not accept any attempts to stop workers from organising, and that taking away legal days off as a punishment would go against labour law and company policy.

== Beers ==
- Angkor Premium Beer - a Pale Lager (5.0% alc/vol) available in 330ml can, 330ml bottle, and 640ml bottle
- Angkor Extra Stout - an Extra Stout (8.0% alc/vol) available in 330ml Bottle, and 640ml bottle
- Klang Beer - a strong Lager (6.0% alc/vol) available in 330ml can.
- Bayon Beer - a Pale Lager (4.6% alc/vol) available in 330ml can. The beer is named after the iconic Cambodian Bayon temples near Siem Reap.

Cambrew says of the beer, "This exotic beer is brewed in Sihanoukville, Cambodia employing the best traditional processes. Bayon Beer embodies the full quality of an Asian beer with an alcohol content of between 5.0% to 5.2%. Bayon Beer is essentially catered to Asian drinkers with a smooth and hoppy aroma to give a pleasant after taste."

- Black Panther Premium Stout - a Stout (8.0% alc/vol) available in 330ml can. It has a strong malt odour. It was introduced in 2000.
- Carlsberg Draught - a Pilsner (5.0% alc/vol)
