= Three Coins Beer =

Sri Lankan beer

Three Coins
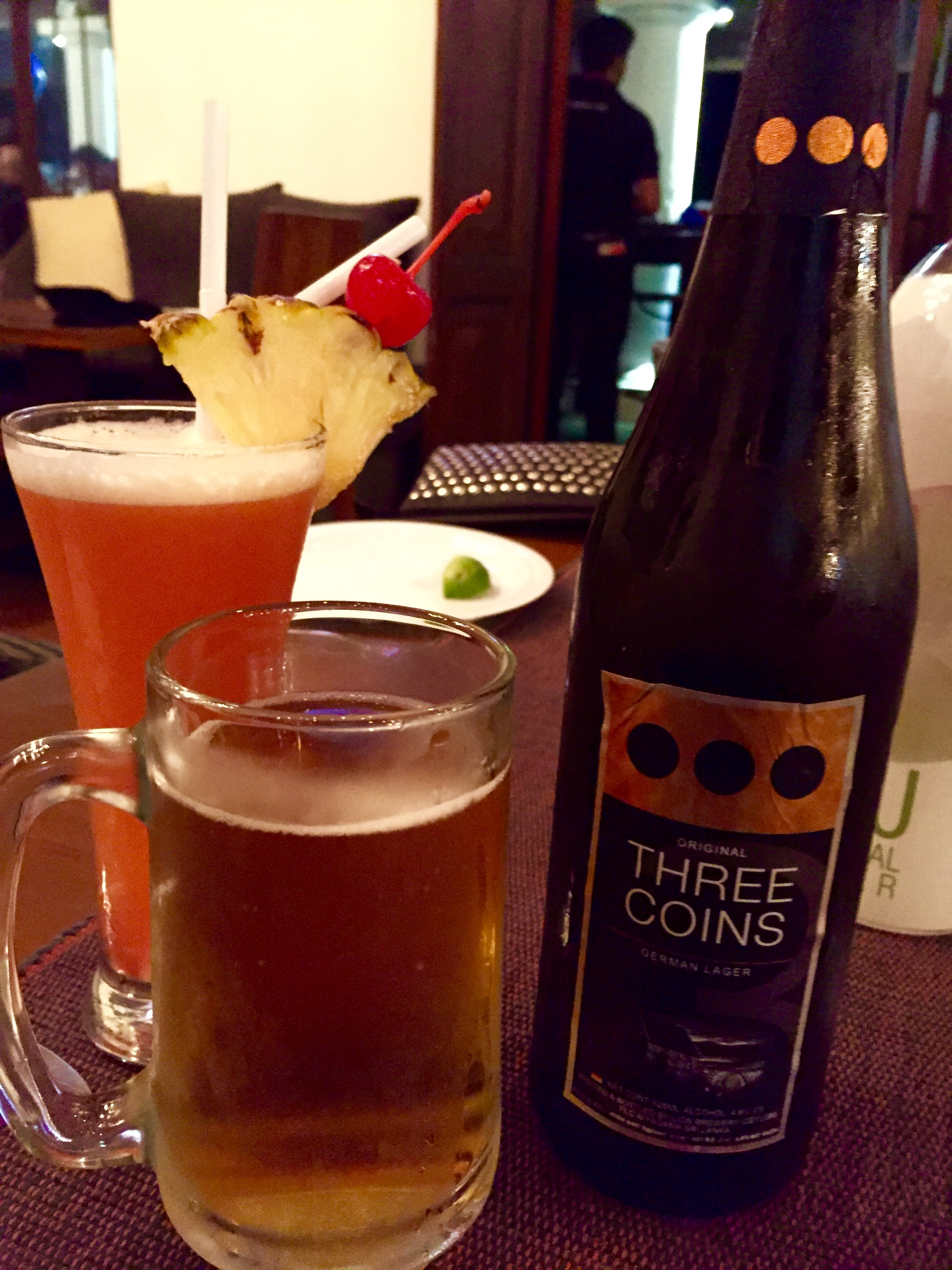
- Type: Pale Lager
- Manufacturer: McCallum Breweries (Ceylon) Ltd
- Origin: Sri Lanka
- Introduced: 1962
- Alcohol by volume: 4.8%
- Website: Official website

Three Coins is a Sri Lankan beer brewed by McCallum Breweries (Ceylon) Ltd, a subsidiary of Cargills Ceylon PLC.

== History ==
McCallum Brewery Limited was established in 1962 by the U. K. Edmund in Meegoda (a suburb of Colombo). In February 2011 Cargills Ceylon PLC acquired the McCallum Brewery via Cargill’s 100% owned subsidiary Millers Brewery Ltd for Rs. 1.425 billion. The Cargills Group subsequently spent Rs. 2 billion upgrading the brewery, increasing the capacity from 50,000hL/yr to 600,000hL/yr. In June 2014 it was reported that Cargills was preparing to sell Millers Brewery, the likely purchasers of the company include Distilleries Company of Sri Lanka PLC and Carson Cumberbatch PLC. In November 2014 it was announced that Lion Brewery had purchased Millers Brewery Limited from Cargills for Rs 5.15 billion and would commence the brewing of the Millers Brewery products at its facility in Biyagama, with production at the Meegoda plant ceasing temporarily pending further evaluation.

== Varieties ==
- Three Coins – 4.8% ABV, an all-malt lager
- Sando Stout - 8.8% ABV, a stout made with Danish barley, Scottish malt and German hops. No longer in production.
- Three Coins Riva - 4.8% ABV, a Belgian style witbier. Launched in 2001, as a jointly branded product with Belgian brewers, Riva N.V., it was the first wheat beer brewed in Asia.
- Irish Dark - 7.5% ABV, an Irish-style ale. No longer in production.
- Irish Dark Red Ale - 4.5% ABV, an Irish-style ale.
- Grand Blonde - 8.8% ABV. Launched in 2009.
- Sando Power Strong - 8.8% ABV

Millers Brewery also brews Foster's under license from Carlton & United Breweries Ltd.
