= Huế Beer =

Vietnamese lager beer

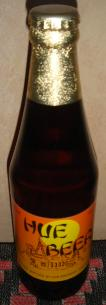
Bottle of Hue Beer

Huế Beer (Vietnamese: Bia Huế) is a Vietnamese lager produced in Huế by Hue Brewery, which also produces Huda, its principal beer brand.

Huế Beer was launched in April 1994 for the U.S. market, after the trade embargo on Vietnam was lifted that February. It subsequently expanded to other export markets and was also sold domestically.

== See also ==
- Huda Beer
- List of companies in Vietnam
