= Agro Bukit =

PT Agro Bukit is a palm oil company from Indonesia. Its headquarters is in Sampit, Central Kalimantan. It is a subsidiary of Goodhope Asia Holdings Ltd, part of Sri Lankan conglomerate Carson Cumberbatch. It is or used to be active in South Kalimantan and Central Kalimantan. In 2012, the government of East Kotawaringin Regency in Central Kalimantan has told the company to temporarily halt part of its operations for allegedly violating its concession permit.

It is or used to be owned at 95% by Bukit Darah PLC. In 2017, investment by Bukit Darah into the company was at 4,785,841 Sri Lankan rupee. It had 10,818 hectares planted as of March 2009. There are conflicts about land tenure. According to Rainforest Rescue, residents in Penyang were not consulted in 2004 when the local government gave the company a permit for a plantation on 6,000 hectares of forest and farmland belonging to the community. There were about 50 Orangutans in its concession area in Borneo.
