= Gorkha Beer =

Nepalese beer brand

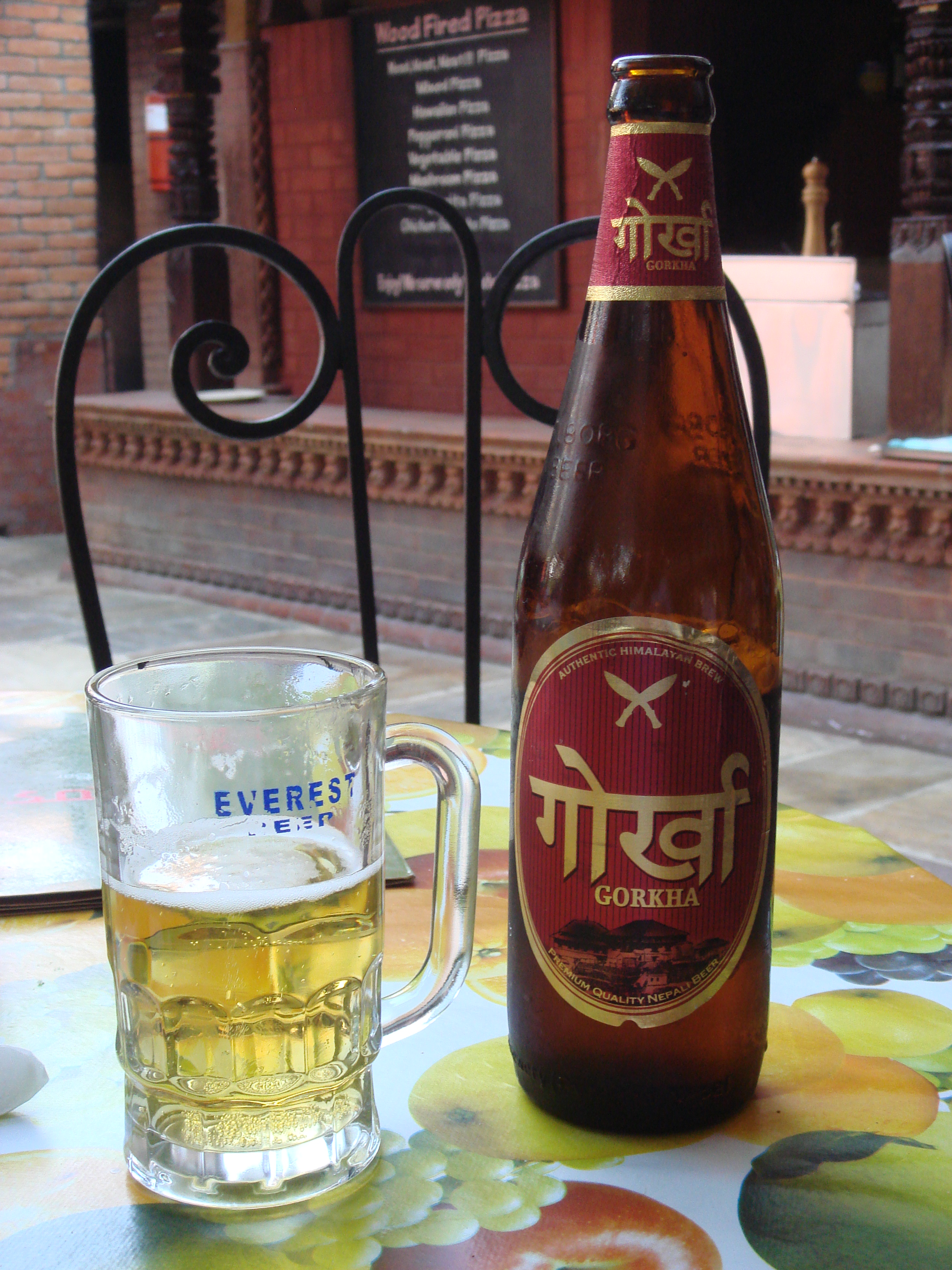
- Glass and bottle of Gorkha Beer
- Type: Beer
- Manufacturer: Gorkha Brewery Ltd.
- Origin: Nepal
- Introduced: May 2006
- Alcohol by volume: 5.0%
- Website: www.gorkhabrewery.com/en/

Gorkha Beer (Nepali: गोर्खा बीअर) is a brand of beer brewed in Nepal. It is a pale lager, brewed by Gorkha Brewery Ltd. and launched in May 2006. The alcohol content is listed in its label to be 5.0% alc/vol. It is one of the few beers produced in Nepal. The name derives from the Gurkha, people of Nepal. Gorkha Brewery (P) Ltd. was established in 1989. It is owned by Nepalese Khetan Group.

== See also ==
- Gorkha Airlines

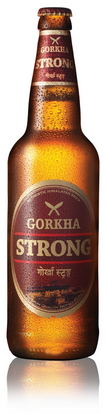
Gorkha Strong Beer
