= Khmer Beverages =

Cambodian brewery and beverage company

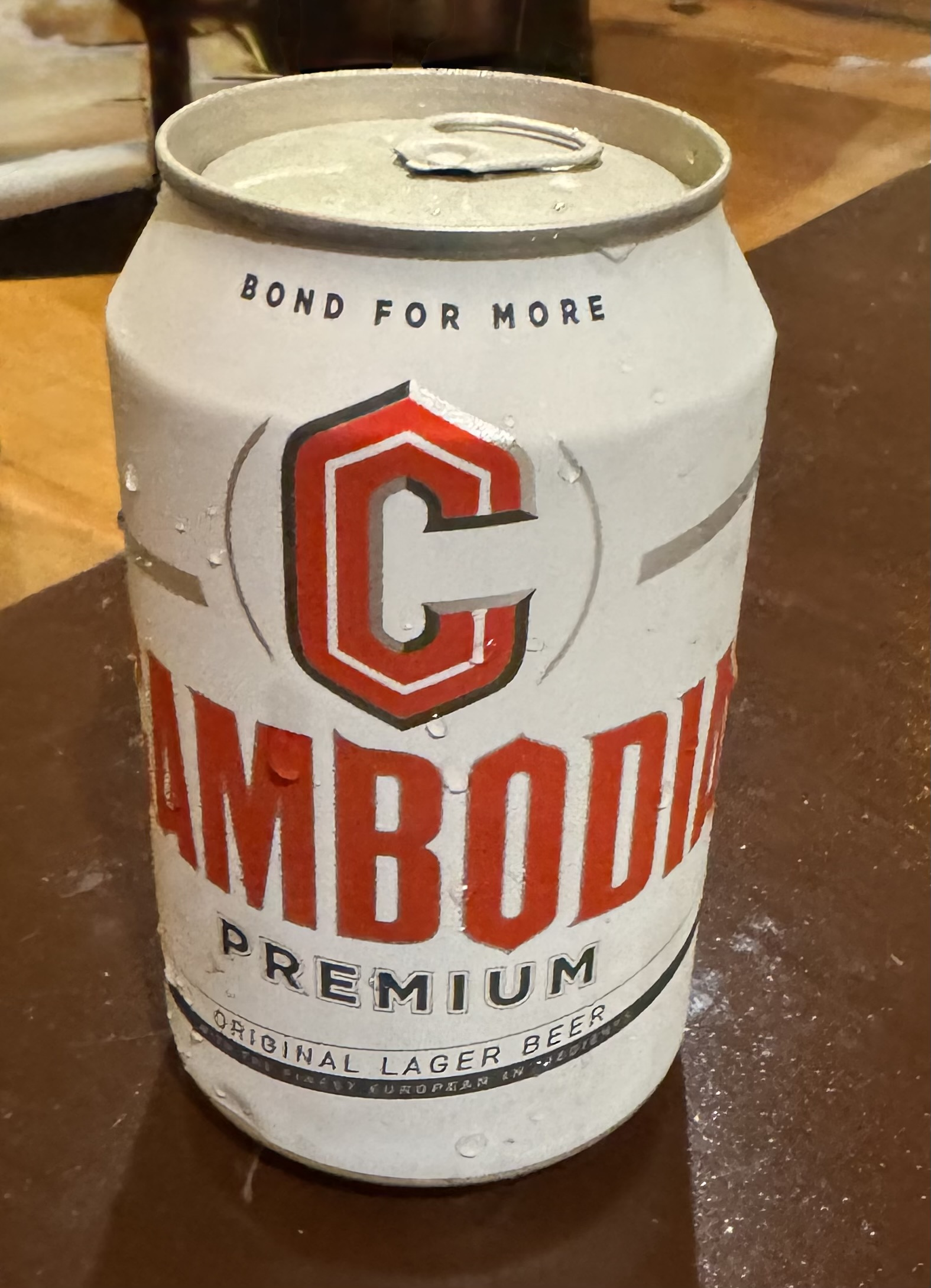
- Industry: Alcoholic beverage
- Founded: 2009
- Headquarters: Phnom Penh, Cambodia
- Key people: Kuh Leang (Chairman), Meng Leang (Group President)
- Products: Beer, soft drinks and bottled water
- Number of employees: 1,000+
- Parent: Chip Mong Group
- Website: Official website

Khmer Beverages (Khmer: ភេសជ្ជៈខ្មែរ), previously known as Khmer Brewery (Khmer: រោងចក្រខ្មែរ), is a Cambodian brewery company, founded in 2009. It produces beer and non-alcoholic beverages.

The company is owned by the Chip Mong Group. In 2009 the company purchased 9 ha (22 acres) of land in the Cheung Ek district of Phnom Penh. Construction of the turnkey brewery and bottling facility, equipped by German brewery providers, Ziemann Holvrieka, commenced in January 2010, at a cost of US$60M. In 2010 they released their first beer, Cambodia Beer, with a production capacity of 6,000,000 L (1,300,000 imp gal; 1,600,000 US gal) per year.

In 2013 they expanded the brewery, increasing capacity to 200,000,000 L (44,000,000 imp gal; 53,000,000 US gal) per year. In 2017 they underwent a third expansion, increasing annual production capacity to 600,000,000 L (130,000,000 imp gal; 160,000,000 US gal), at a cost of US$120M.

In 2017 they renamed the brewery to Khmer Beverages, and introduced a range of non-alcoholic beverages (soft drinks and water). In the same year Khmer Beverages signed a multi-year sponsorship deal with Manchester City F. C., to be the club's official water, soft drinks and energy drink partner in Cambodia. In 2019 they rebranded their flagship beer, Cambodia Beer, in response to ongoing concerns about the use of the Preah Vihear temple in its branding.

In June 2019, Khmer Beverages is a member of the Bangkok Brewing Conference, a conference organized by the Thailand Beer Industry Guild

==== Collaboration with Galaxy Music Thailand ====
In July 2025, Khmer Beverages signed an export cooperation MOU involving Galaxy Music Thailand to bring in Cambodian Beverages into Thailand

== Products ==
Khmer Brewery offers three main types of beer and two speciality beers:

- Cambodia Beer – a traditional pilsener (5% alc/vol)
- Cambodia Premium Draft (5% alc/vol)
- Cambodia Lite (4% alc/vol)
- Kudo Lager (5% alc/vol)
- Barrley Black Extra Stout Beer (8% alc/vol)

== Awards ==
In 2013 the brewery won a bronze medal at the 2013 International Brewing Awards for Cambodia Beer.

Inn 2015 they won a bronze medal at the Transform Awards Asia-Pacific, in the category, Best Brand Experience.
