= Heart of Darkness (brewery) =

Vietnamese microbrewery

- Industry: Alcoholic beverage Brewing
- Founded: 2016
- Founders: John Pemberton, Andrew Stephens and Thu Nguyễn
- Headquarters: Ho Chi Minh City, Vietnam
- Number of locations: 2
- Area served: Ho Chi Minh City and Singapore (bars); Multinational (distribution)
- Products: Beer
- Website: heartofdarknessbrewery.com/en

Heart of Darkness is a craft brewery founded in 2016 in Ho Chi Minh City, Vietnam.

The company operates one brewery in Vietnam and two tasting rooms in Singapore and Ho Chi Minh City respectively.

== Identity ==
The brewery's name and range of beer are inspired by the Joseph Conrad novella, Heart of Darkness.

== Retail and distribution ==
Heart of Darkness' beer is distributed throughout Vietnam, Singapore, Thailand, Taiwan, Hong Kong, Malaysia, Cambodia, New Zealand, Australia and Finland.

== Collaborations ==
Heart of Darkness has produced collaborative beers with other breweries, such as Magic Rock Brewing, Little Creatures Brewery, Gweilo Beer, and Behemoth Brewing Company in New Zealand.

== Awards ==
Heart of Darkness has won 25 International Medals since opening. These include:

- Gold - Primeval Forest Pilsner - Asia Beer Cup Tokyo, 2017
- Silver - Conquistador Mexican Pilsner, Bronze - Eloquent Phantom Imperial Stout, Bronze - Directors Cacao Nib Porter - International Beer Cup Tokyo, 2017
- Silver - Conquistador Mexican Pilsner, Bronze - Primeval Forest Pilsner, Bronze - Dream Alone Pale Ale, Bronze - Pitiless Folly Pale Ale - AIBA Melbourne, 2018
- Gold - Dream Alone Pale Ale, Silver - Loose Rivet NEIPA, Bronze - Primeval Forest Pilsner - Asia Beer Competition, 2018
- Bronze - Directors Cacao, Bronze - Dream Alone Pale Ale, Bronze - Loose Rivet NEIPA - AIBA Melbourne, 2019
- Gold - Dream Alone Pale Ale, Silver - Some Sorcerer NEIPA, Silver - Futile Purpose Pilsner, Bronze - The Mistress IIPA - Asia Beer Competition, 2019
- Gold - Merciless Phantom Imperial Stout, Gold - Loose Rivet NEIPA, Gold - The Mistress IIPA, Silver - The Island IPL, Bronze - Dream Alone Pale Ale - Cathay Pacific Hong Kong International Wine & Spirit Competition, 2019
- Gold - Directors Cacao Porter - Singapore Beer Festival, 2019
- Silver - The Mistress IIPA - Asia Beer Competition, 2020
