= Angkor Beer =

Cambodian lager since 1963

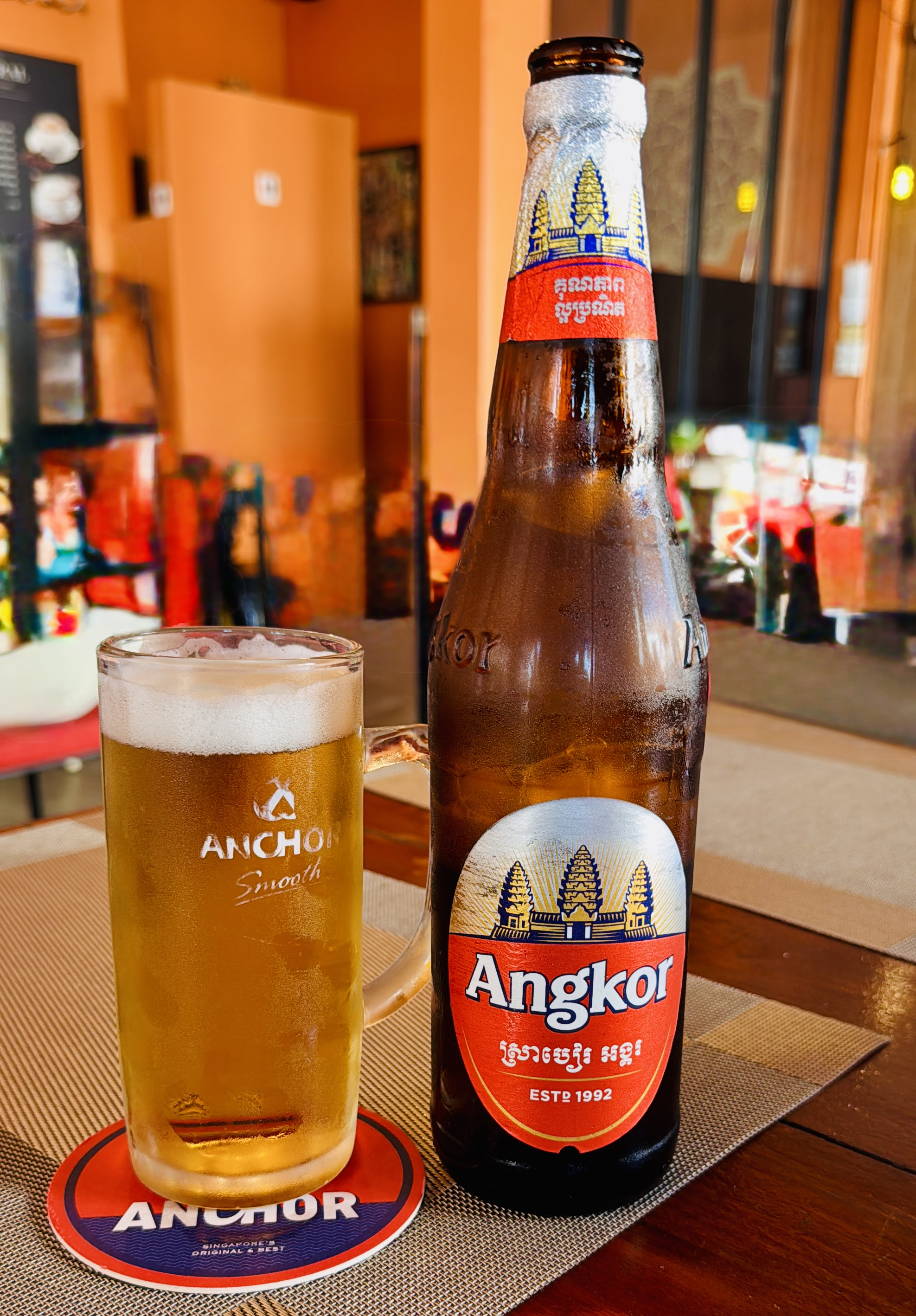
- Angkor beer bottle in Siem Reap, Cambodia (November 2025)
- Type: Lager
- Manufacturer: Cambrew Brewery
- Origin: Cambodia
- Introduced: 1963
- Alcohol by volume: 5%
- Website: www.angkorbeer.com.kh

Angkor Beer (Khmer: ស្រាបៀរ អង្គរ, Srabiĕr Ângkôr [sraːɓiːə ʔɑŋkɔː]) is a Cambodian lager, named after the iconic Cambodian Angkor temples near Siem Reap. It is the most widely consumed beer in Cambodia. Along with Klang Beer, Bayon Beer, Angkor Extra Stout, and Black Panther Premium Stout, it is brewed at the Cambrew Brewery in Sihanoukville. Its official motto is "My Country, My Beer" (Khmer: ប្រទេសខ្ញុំ ស្រាបៀរខ្ញុំ).

== History ==
Angkor Beer was first produced in 1963 by the Angkor Beer Factory, located in Sihanoukville, Cambodia. The factory was established by the Cambodian government in the early 1960s, with French construction and technical assistance (the project to establish the brewery had been in the works since the early 1920s during the French colonial period). The factory produced beer under two brands: Angkor Beer and Bayon Beer.

In the 1970s (during the Lon Nol era), the factory suffered continuous losses and was eventually closed and destroyed by the Khmer Rouge regime. As a result, the factory ceased operations during the late 1970s and 1980s.

In 1991, an Australian company expressed interest in re-establishing the Angkor Brewery, but withdrew due to the unfavourable conditions in Cambodia. Later that year, a Malaysian company bought the company and changed the name to "Cambrew". In 1992, Angkor Beer production resumed at its original location in Sihanoukville. Bayon Beer was also restarted in 1995.

Angkor Beer products are not only popular in Cambodia, they are also exported to many countries around the world, including the European Union, Japan, Australia, and the United States.

== Logos ==
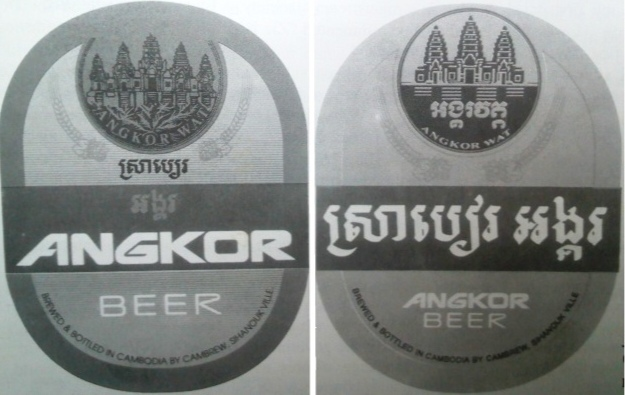
Two logos of Cambodian lager, Angkor Beer from c. late 1900s

The Angkor Beer logo originally featured the five Angkor temples, similar to the temples' depiction on the national flag of the People's Republic of Kampuchea. When democracy was restored to Modern Cambodia in 1993 the official flag of Cambodia was changed, featuring only three Angkor temples. The logo of Angkor Beer has since been updated to match.
