= Chip Mong =

Cambodian commercial group

Chip Mong Group
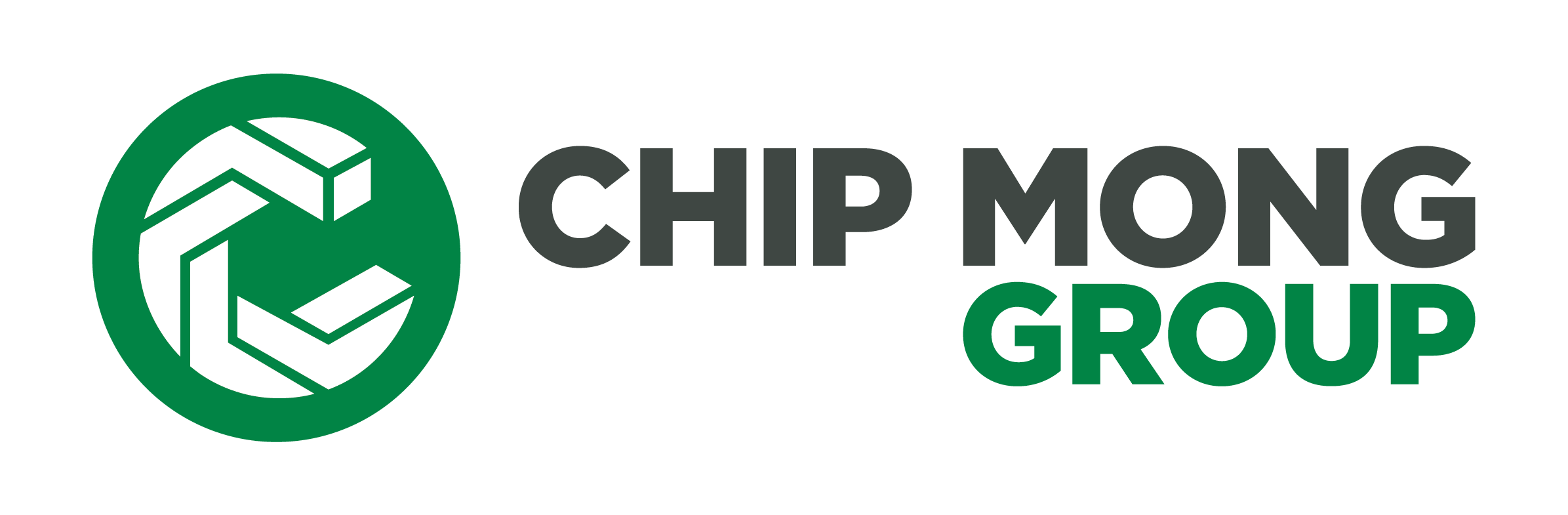
- Native name: ក្រុមហ៊ុន ជីប ម៉ុង
- Genre: Conglomerate
- Founded: 1982
- Founder: Neak Oknhna Pheap Heak; Neak Ouknha Leang Khun; Neak Ouknha Leang Meng
- Headquarters: 137, Mao Tse Tung Blvd., Boeng Keng Kang III, Chamkamon, Phnom Penh, Cambodia
- Key people: Neak Oknha Leang Khun; Neak Oknha Leang Meng
- Number of employees: 5,000+
- Subsidiaries: Chip Mong Trading; Chip Mong Industries; Chip Mong Land; Khmer Beverages; Crown Production; Chip Mong Insee; Hyatt Regency Phnom Penh; Chip Mong Feed; Chip Mong Retail; Fairfield Marriot Phnom Penh; Chip Mong Bank; Grand Royal Golf and Resorts; Grand Phnom Penh City
- Website: chipmong.com/en/

Chip Mong Group Co., Ltd, commonly referred to as Chip Mong, is a Cambodian conglomerate that provides services in consumer goods, construction materials, property development, beer and beverages production, cement, hotel and hospitality, feed, retail and banking. It was established in 1982 and is one of the largest conglomerates in Cambodia.

== History ==
Chip Mong was established in 1982 and has grown into "one of the largest homegrown conglomerates [in Cambodia]".

From the 1980s, as Cambodia recovered from the massive devastation of the Cambodian Civil War and the atrocities of the Khmers Rouges regime, Madam Pheap Heak started a small business to buy and sell construction scrap metal, before in 1997 setting up a company called Chip Mong to import fine steel from abroad to supply to Cambodia's construction sector.

From 1990 onwards, Chip Mong began expanding its business by importing cement and consumer goods from neighboring countries. Chip Mong has since become one of the leading local supplier of construction materials and consumer products in the country.

In 2008, the Chip Mong group launched into real estate and in 2009, in the beer and beverages by launching Khmer Brewery.

In December 2010, the Chip Mong Group entered the booming construction sector in Cambodia, relying on ties with both Vietnam on one side, and Thailand on the other, by signing a $200 million joint - venture agreement with Siam City Cement Plc. The cement factory was inaugurated by Prime Minister Hun Sen on February 8, 2018.

In late 2015, Chip Mong Group and Siam City Cement Public Co Ltd entered a joint venture to produce cement in Cambodia, with Chip Mong Group holding a 60% majority stake in this joint venture.

Chip Mong recently entered the sector of tourism and hospitality by renovating and expanding a luxury hotel in Daun Penh together with the American multinational hospitality company Hyatt in 2016, finally opening in 2020 amid the COVID-19 pandemic, during which the Chip Mong group along other private investors helped the Cambodian government with major donations.

In 2017, Chip Mong invested about $60 million in a plant to produce pig feed, with facilities to raise pigs for the Cambodian market, in an effort to "reduce imports and increase products produced by Cambodia".

In 2018, Chip Mong expanded into the financial sector with its newest venture – Chip Mong Commercial Bank Plc.

Chip Mong's growth goes along with the evolution of Cambodia from the past as a primarily agricultural country to the industrialised nation.

Khmer Beverages is also the official importer of Lactosoy, a popular Thai soy milk brand.

Three years later, in March 2021, the three major players of the Chip Mong group were all elevated to the rank of Oknha on the same occasion by a royal decree issued by His Majesty King Norodom Sihamoni.

On July 2025, Khmer Beverages, a subsidiary of Chip Mong is expending it's international exports and collaborating with Galaxy Music Co Ltd, a Thai Music record label and entertainment company.

== Structure ==
Chip Mong is a family-owned business headed by Oknha Leang Khun and Leang Meng under the leadership of Chairlady Oknha Madam Pheap Heak.

Chip Mong invests into several child businesses, so-called subsidiaries:

- Chip Mong Trading,
- Chip Mong Industries,
- Chip Mong Land,
- Khmer Beverages reportedly employing 1,100 staff as of 2019,
  - Crown Khmer Beverages Cans Limited,
- Chip Mong Insee Cement Corporation,
- Hyatt Regency Phnom Penh,
- Chip Mong Feed,
- Chip Mong Retail,
- Fairfield by Marriott Phnom Penh', the first Fairfield by Marriott hotel in Cambodia, in 2017
- Chip Mong Commercial Bank,
- Grand Phnom Penh City,
- Grand Royal Golf & Resorts.
