= Huda Beer =

Lager beer produced in Vietnam

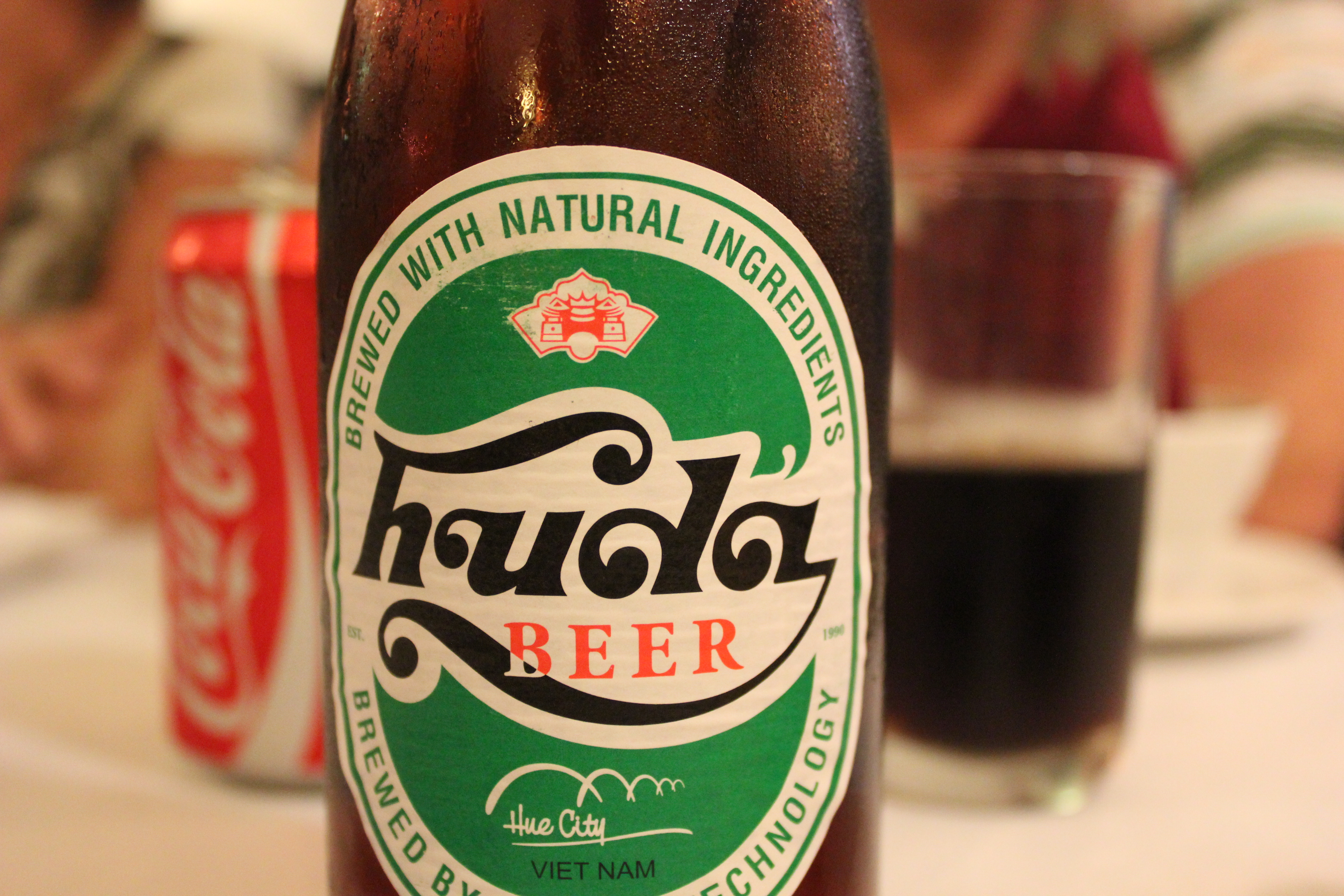
A bottle of Huda Beer

Huda Beer is a Vietnamese lager created in Huế in 1990 by Hue Brewery and a major beer brand in Central Vietnam. Its name combines Huế and Đan Mạch, Vietnamese for Denmark.

Huda has an alcohol by volume content of 4.7% and is brewed from water, barley, rice and hops. The range also includes Huda Gold (4.7%), launched in 2013, and Huda Ice Twist (4.2%), launched in 2023.

Huda held 7.9% of Vietnam's beer market by volume in 2023, ranking fifth among individual brands. It won a silver medal at the World Beer Championships in 2013; in 2020, Huda and Huda Ice Blast received two Gold Medals at the Monde Selection Awards.

Hue Brewery was established in 1990 on Nguyễn Sinh Cung Street, beside the Perfume River, using brewing technology and equipment supplied by Danbrew, a subsidiary of Carlsberg. In 1994, it became a joint venture with Carlsberg and the Danish Industrialisation Fund for Developing Countries (IFU); Carlsberg acquired IFU's 15% stake in 2003, raising its holding to 50%, and the province's remaining 50% in 2011. A second brewery in the Phú Bài Industrial Zone was completed in April 2008. In August 2014, all beer-production lines at the Nguyễn Sinh Cung site were transferred to Phú Bài, consolidating production there. Following a major expansion in 2025, Phú Bài reached an annual capacity of 600 million litres and became Carlsberg's largest beer-production facility in Asia. The brewery produces Huda alongside Halida and international brands including Carlsberg, 1664 Blanc, Tuborg and Somersby.

== See also ==
- Beer in Vietnam
- List of companies in Vietnam
