= Sabeco Brewery =

Vietnamese beer producer

Saigon Beer-Alcohol-Beverage Corporation
- Trade name: SABECO
- Native name: Tổng Công ty Cổ phần Bia – Rượu – Nước giải khát Sài Gòn
- Type: Public company
- Traded as: HOSE: SAB
- Industry: Beverages
- Founded: 1875; 151 years ago
- Founder: Victor Larue
- Headquarters: Ho Chi Minh City, Vietnam
- Area served: Vietnam
- Key people: Koh Poh Tiong (Chairman), Neo Gim Siong Bennett (CEO)
- Products: Beer; Wine
- Production output: 1.796 billion liters (2018)
- Revenue: 35,949 bn VND (2018)
- Net income: 4,403 bn VND (2018)
- Total assets: 24,061 bn VND (QII 2019)
- Total equity: 18,592 bn VND (QII 2019)
- Owner: ThaiBev
- Subsidiaries: 25 subsidiary companies
- Website: www.sabeco.com.vn (in Vietnamese)

The Saigon Beer – Alcohol – Beverage Corporation (Vietnamese: Tổng Công ty Cổ phần Bia – Rượu – Nước giải khát Sài Gòn), recognized by its trading name Sabeco, is Vietnam's leading beer producer. It was under the authority of Vietnam's Ministry of Trade and Industry but is now a subsidiary of ThaiBev. In 2011, Sabeco produced 1.2 billion liters of beer, 51.4% of the national market. Its main brands are Bia Saigon (Saigon Beer) and 333 Beer.

Sabeco has several regional subsidiaries throughout Vietnam.

== Ownership ==
Sabeco had an initial public offering in 2008.

Vietnam's Ministry of Trade and Industry owned almost 89.59% of Sabeco as of September 2012, as well a majority of shares of the competitor Habeco. The Ministry's leadership announced in July 2012 that it did not yet intend to cease controlling the company. Nguyễn Bá Thi, former chairman of the Managing Board who was fired by the Ministry in May 2012, said that the Ministry had been interfering too much in the company.

As of September 2012 there were five international companies that were interested in investing in Sabeco. Heineken, SAB Miller, Kirin and Asahi have indicated interest in becoming a stakeholder or strategic partner.

Bangkok-based ThaiBev bought a majority of shares in Sabeco in 2018 for US$4.8 billion US dollars, ending Sabeco's domestic ownership. At the time of the acquisition, Sabeco's Vietnam market share had fallen below 40 percent.

== Market share and competition ==
Sabeco's market share was 51.4% in 2010. Its main competitors are Habeco (also owned by the Ministry of Industry and Trade) (13.9%) and Vietnam Brewery Limited (VBL, 29.7%), a joint-venture of Singapore's Asia Pacific Breweries and Saigon Trading Group (Satra), which brews and sells Heineken, Tiger Beer and Bière Larue in Vietnam.

== Vietnam War-era ==
Ba Muoi Ba Biere (33 Beer) was a popular local brand among American soldiers during the U.S. war in Vietnam. It was the precursor to "333" Biere. "33" Biere Export is made by BGI Tien Giang.

== Gallery ==
Products of Sabeco

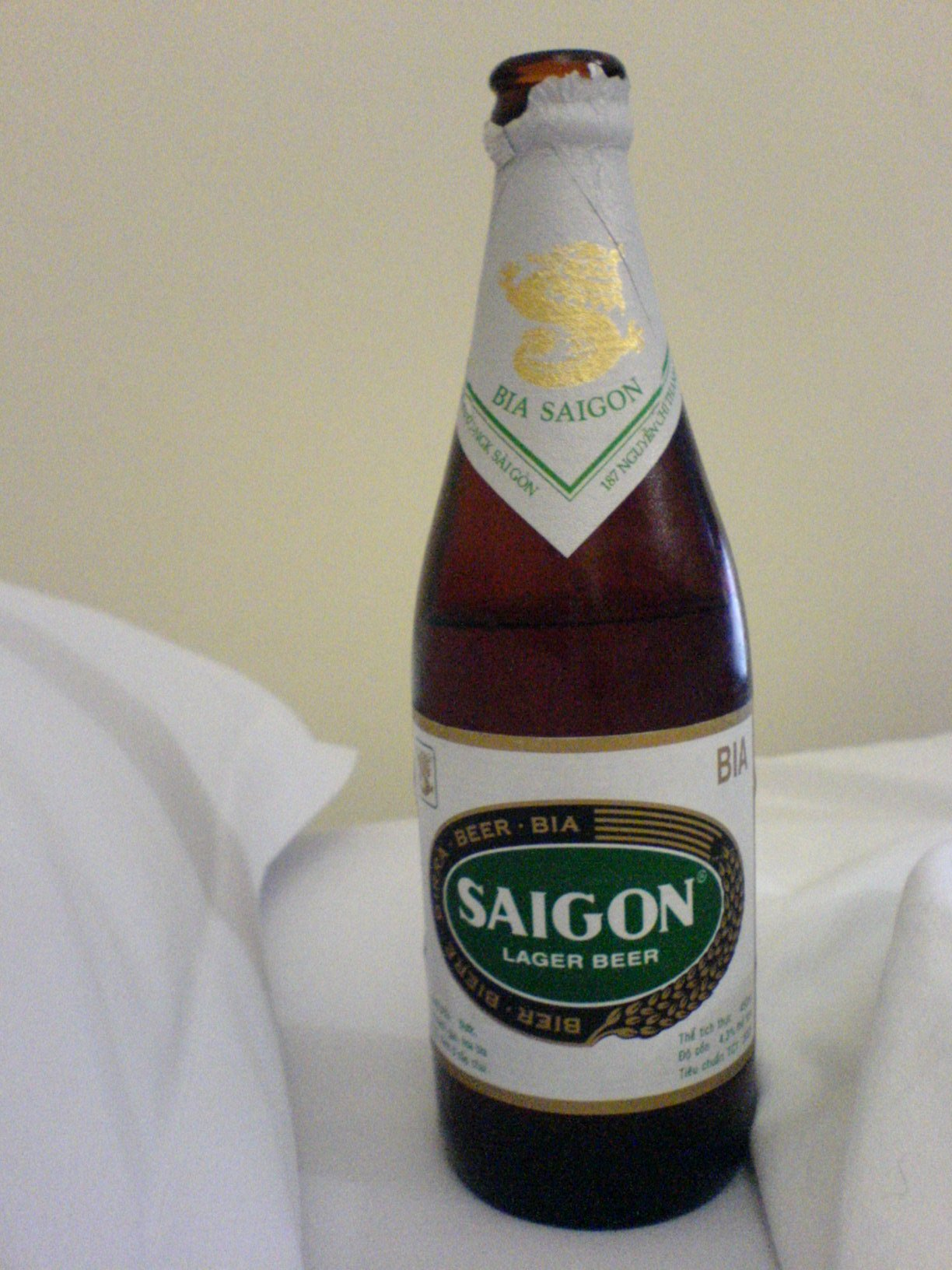

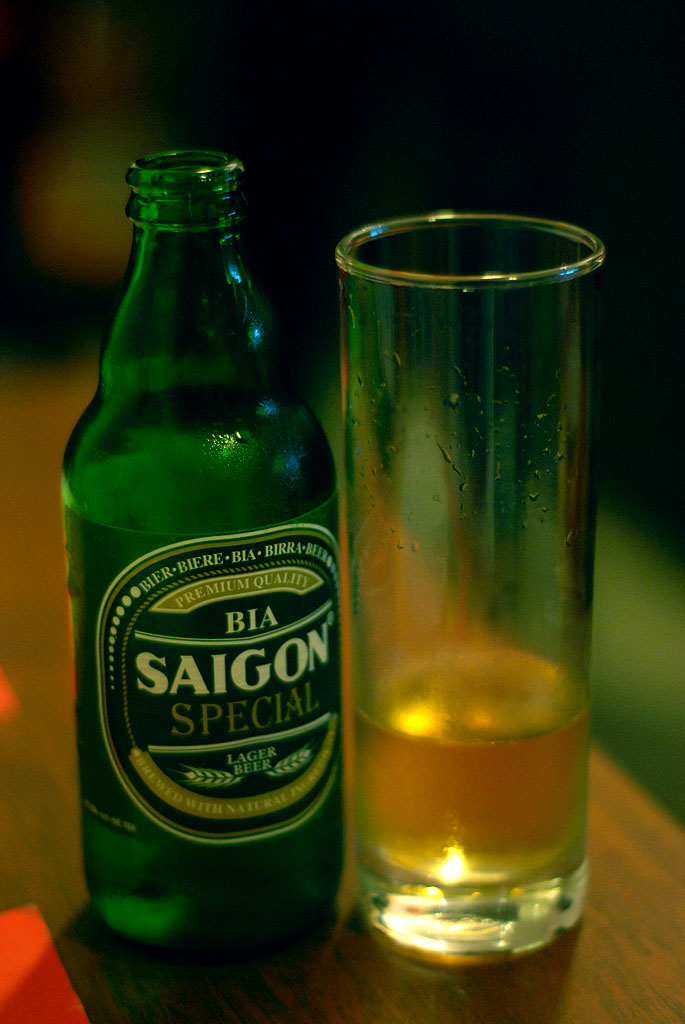
