= Hanoi Beer =

Beer brand produced in Hanoi, Vietnam

Hanoi Beer (Vietnamese: Bia Hà Nội) is a beer brand produced in Hanoi, Vietnam. It is a brand of Habeco, a state company that is partially owned by Carlsberg. It was first introduced in 1890.

The logo shows the One Pillar Pagoda flanked by two bears.
