= Bia hơi =

Type of draught beer popular in Vietnam

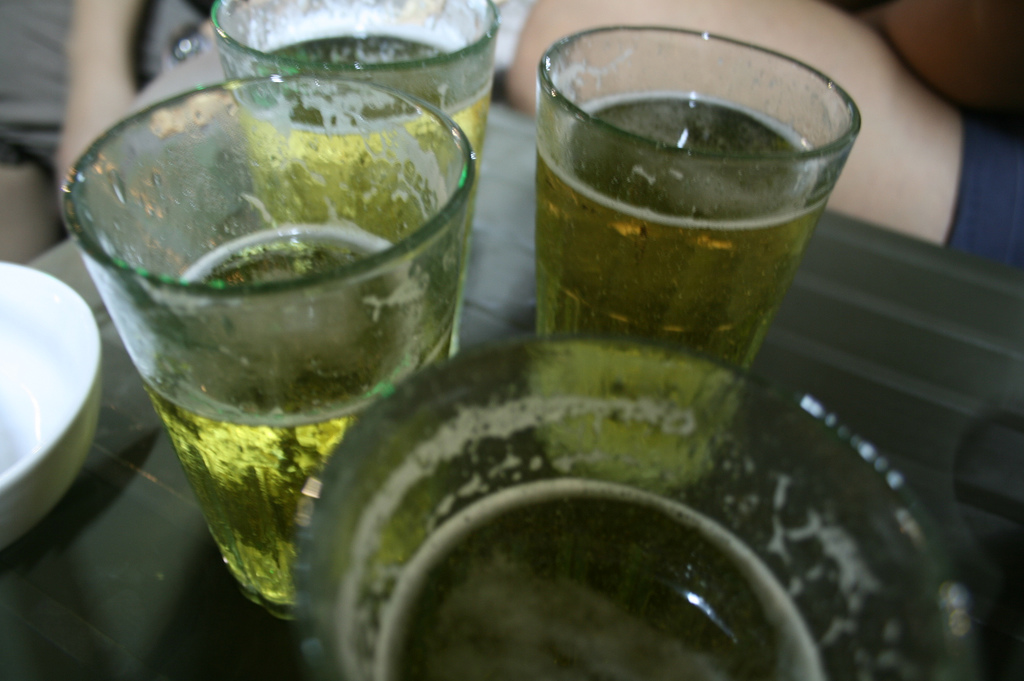
- Glasses of bia hơi
- Type: Alcoholic beverage
- Origin: Vietnam
- Variants: Draught beer

Bia hơi ("fresh beer") is a type of draught beer popular in Vietnam.

Bia hơi is available primarily in northern Vietnam. It is mostly to be found in small bars and on street corners. The beer is brewed daily, then matured for a short period and once ready each bar gets a fresh batch delivered every day in steel barrels. It is a very light (around 4.1-4.3% alcohol), refreshing lager at a fraction of the cost of draft or bottled beer in the Western-style bars. Bia hơi production is informal and not monitored by any health agency. A glass is typically priced between 10,000₫ (US$0.43) and 15,000₫ ($0.52).

Bia hơi is served in specially made beer glasses, manufactured with recycled glass. Faults from the manufacturing process are clearly visible in the glassware. While this lower quality is, in the modern day, deliberate, it has its origins in the 1970s, when the first of these glasses were made rapidly with low-cost materials.
