= Habeco =

Beverage company headquartered in Hanoi, Vietnam

- Company type: State-owned joint-stock company
- Industry: beverages
- Founded: 1890
- Headquarters: Hanoi, Vietnam
- Production output: 422.3 million liters (2011)
- Revenue: VND 3,416.2 billion (2011)
- Operating income: VND 962 billion (2011)
- Owner: Ministry of Industry and Trade Vietnam, Carlsberg Group
- Website: habeco.com.vn/index.php?lang=en%2F

Habeco (also HABECO, Hanoi Beer Alcohol and Beverage Joint Stock Corporation, Vietnamese: Tổng công ty Cổ phần Bia – Rượu – Nước giải khát Hà Nội) is a beverage company headquartered in Hanoi, Vietnam. It is the third largest beer company in Vietnam and owner of the brands Hanoi Beer and Truc Bach Beer. It is under the ownership and authority of the Ministry of Industry and Trade, Vietnam and has a strategic partnership with Carlsberg Group, which owns more than 10% of the company's shares as of November 2012. Habeco produced 422.4 million liters of beer and sold 413.5 million liters in 2011, an increase of 4% and 2.3% from 2010.

== Ownership ==
Vietnam's Ministry of Trade and Industry owns 83% of the companies' shares as of November 2012. Carlsberg Group acquired shares during Habeco's initial public offering in March 2008 and held 15.8% as of 2012. The Ministry asked Habeco to sell another 13% to Carlsberg to expand the companies' strategic partnership in November 2012.

== Market Share and Competitors ==
Habeco's market share was 13.9% in 2010. Its main competitors are Sabeco (also owned by the Ministry of Industry and Trade) (51.4%) and Vietnam Brewery Ltd (VBL, 29.7%), a joint-venture between Heineken Asia Pacific and Saigon Trading Group (Satra).
