= Mawathagama =

- Location within Sri Lanka
- Coordinates: 7°25′28″N 80°26′23″E
- Province: North Western Province

Area
  - Total: 105 km^{2} (41 sq mi)

Population (2020)
  - Total: 75,081
  - Density: 618/km^{2} (1,600/sq mi)
- Time zone: UTC+5:30 (Sri Lanka Standard Time Zone)
  - Summer (DST): UTC+6

Mawathagama is a town in the Kurunegala District, North Western Province of Sri Lanka. It is the third most developed city in Kurunegala District. It is situated 12 km (7.5 mi) from Kurunegala and 30 km (19 mi) from Kandy. It is home to over 75,000 people. 30% of them are age 0-18. Mawathagama is one of the most economically and politically important cities in North Western Province of Sri Lanka. It is an education and industrial hub for numerous people. Mawathagama Export Processing Zone is the largest industrial complex in the region

== Geography ==
Mawathagama borders to Central Province, Sri Lanka and Sabaragamuwa Province which it makes a different geographical region compared to other cities in the Kurunegala District. Mawathagama is the division with most Mountains in the entire North Western Province of Sri Lanka. It borders with Kurunegala, Dodangaslanda, Hiriyala, Rambukkana and Galagedara, Central Province electoral divisions. Crops are enriched by Deduru Oya. The Handurukkanda is a favorite destination for most of local hill climbers.

== History ==
The Ancient Makulana Rajamaha Viharaya is located in Mawathagama.According to Buddhist annals, Trapusa and Bahalika, the two merchants who met Buddha just after attaining enlightenment and who offered their first meal were given some hair by Buddha. The two merchants arrived in Sri Lanka and part of their holy relics were given to a merchant friend called ‘Kanaka’ who took it to his Keppetipola village. There he offered this relic to a regional king called Bimba who had built this Stupa enshrining this holy relic. Based on this information, this stupa would have first been built around 589 BC even though it's unlikely what you see today is the same stupa. The current temple is believed to have been built during the reign of King Parakramabahu IV of Dambadeniya in the 14th century. On one side of the stupa is a large ancient rock inscription that is now mostly faded even though the images of animals can still be seen.

During World War 2 Northern Mawathagama was used as an Airport. Its most important reason for the construction was the arrival of Louis Mountbatten, 1st Earl Mountbatten of Burma to Kandy. After the 1950s it became least necessary for the Government of Sri Lanka so they decided to close the Airport and share the lands to the locals

== Demographic details ==
Ethnic identities in Mawathagama (2020)
1. Sinhalese (82.0%)
2. Sri Lankan Moors (11.6%)
3. Sri Lankan Tamils (6.10%)
4. Burgher people (0.20%)
5. Other (0.00%)

According to the Divisional Secretariat, the population of Mawathagama in the year 2020 was 75,081. The majority of the population belongs to the Sinhalese majority. Other ethnic minorities include the Sri Lankan Moors, Sri Lankan Tamils and Burgher people.

The following Table summarizes the population of Mawathagama according to their ethnicity:

Ethnicity	Percentage
Sinhalese	82.0%
Sri Lankan Moors	11.6%
Sri Lankan Tamil	6.1%
Burgher people	0.2%

== Religion ==
Religion in Mawathagama (2020)
1. Buddhism (79.7%)
2. Islam (13.0%)
3. Hinduism (4.10%)
4. Christianity (3.20%)
5. Other (0.00%)

Buddhism is the main and the most widely practiced religion in Mawathagama. It is also home to a wide range of other religious faiths and sects including Islam, Christianity, and Hinduism.

The Weuda Maha Pirivena, Makulana Rajamaha Viharaya, Galahitiyawa Temple, Sri Muttumari Amman Kovil of Mawathagama, Paragahadeniya Grand Mosque, Thalgaspitiya Mosque and The Calvary Shrine of Mawathagama are the most famous religious sites in the region.

Religion	Population(2020)
Buddhism	59,856
Islam	9,687
Hinduism	3,119
Christianity	2,422

== Economy ==
Mawathagama is one of the most industrialised divisions in North Western Province of Sri Lanka. Mawathagama has one of the few Export processing zones which administrated by Board of Investment of Sri Lanka.

While Agricultural activities (Rice, Vegetables, Fruits, Acanthus (ornament)) are contributed to the household economies and Mass Production factories are contributed to the National economy.

- MAS Holdings
- WAYAMBA PrintPack
- NIPPON PVC holdings
- Hightec Lanka International
- Ceylon Refrigeration & Engineering LTD
- USGEMS
- ERP next
- VIRCO
- United Tobacco Processing
- Prasad Enterprices
- Tharanga Enterprices

== Education ==
Mawathagama has numerous schools, private institutions and state funded professional education institutions

- Mawathagama National School
- Roman Catholic College Mawathagama
- Pothubowa Maha Vidyalaya
- Watareka Maha Vidyalaya
- Weuda Maha Vidyalaya
- Pilessa Maha Vidyalaya
- Digampitiya Vidyalaya
- Meethenwala Maha Vidyalaya
- Kahapathwala Maha Vidyalaya
- Malandeniya Maha Vidyalaya
- Iriminna Primary School
- Athugalpura Sinhawaloka Vidyalaya
- Yatiwala Gunananda Vidyalaya
- Ketawala Primary School
- D.P. Wickramasinghe Vidyalaya
- Weuda Royal College
- Kongaswala Vidyalaya
- Weuda Primary School

There are also many higher educational institutes and private tuition institutes in Mawathagama such as Vocational Training Institution(VTA)
