= Carson Cumberbatch =

Sri Lankan conglomerate holding company

Carson Cumberbatch PLC
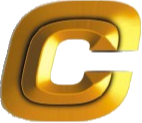
- Company type: Public
- Traded as: CSE: CARS.N0000
- ISIN: LK0022N00000
- Industry: Holding company; Agribusiness; Brewing industry; Hospitality
- Founded: 1913; 113 years ago
- Headquarters: Colombo, Sri Lanka
- Area served: Sri Lanka, Indonesia, Malaysia, India, Singapore
- Key people: W. M. Ravindra S. Dias(Chairman); H. Selvanathan (Deputy chairman); M. Selvanathan (Executive director)
- Revenue: ▲LKR330.459 billion (2023)
- Operating income: ▲LKR59.259 billion (2023)
- Net income: ▲LKR29.002 billion (2023)
- Total assets: ▲LKR299.518 billion (2023)
- Total equity: ▲LKR140.237 billion (2023)
- Number of employees: ▲14,964: Sri Lanka (771); Indonesia (13,853); Malaysia (335); Singapore (5); (2023)
- Parent: Bukit Darah PLC (45.68%)
- Subsidiaries: Goodhope Asia Holdings (53.33%); Ceylon Beverage Holdings (75.37%); Lion Brewery (Ceylon) (59.13%); Pegasus Hotels of Ceylon (89.98%)
- Website: carsoncumberbatch.com

Carson Cumberbatch PLCIs a Sri Lankan conglomerate that is one of the largest in the country, with business interests extending to Indonesia, Malaysia, and India. The company has its origin in the colonial era, having been founded by merging two companies founded by R. B. Carson and Henry Cumberbatch (nephew of Robert William Cumberbatch). The Selvanathan family, founders of the Sri Krishna Corporation, is the ultimate controlling shareholder of the company.

== History ==
The company has its origin in the colonial era, having founded by merging two companies founded by R. B. Carson and Henry Cumberbatch (nephew of Robert William Cumberbatch). The rubber interest of the Carson and Company traded in 1910 in London Stock Exchange with a capital of 1.5 million sterling pounds thus making it the largest rubber business of the country at that time. The Carson and Company converted to a limited liability company in 1913, and the merger with Cumberbatch and Company happened in 1947. In 1976, the company diversified into hotels by building the Giritale Hotel and Moonlight Beach Hotel and taking over the management of Pegasus Reef Hotel. In 1988, Sri Krishna Corporation Limited, a 75 years old company, acquired a controlling interest in Carson Cumberbatch. In 1995, Carson expanded its palm oil interest into Indonesia, and in 1997 a new brewery in Biyagama was commissioned.

In 2006, through Agro Bukit, the company acquired a new plantation of 20,000 hectares (49,000 acres) in Kalimantan, Indonesia. Goodhope Asia Holdings was incorporated in 2008 in Singapore to consolidate the company's plantation sector, and in 2014 the company acquired the Millers Brewery. In September 2020, Ceylon Guardian Investment Trust PLC, the investment managing subsidiary of Carson Cumberbatch entered into an agreement with Singapore-based Gazelle Asset Management to sell 84% of the stake of Guardian Capital Partners PLC. When that agreement did not realise, Carson Cumberbatch, sold a 75.6% stake of Guardian Capital Partners PLC to a Renuka Holdings-led consortium for LKR636 million in October 2021.

== Corporate structure ==
Bukit Darah PLC, a member of Carsons Group, is the largest shareholder of the company while the Selvanathan family, founders of the Sri Krishna Corporation, is the ultimate controlling shareholder. In turn, Carson Cumberbatch owns a 6.15% of shares of Bukit Darah PLC in a circular ownership scenario. The company holds ten quoted companies including Pegasus Hotels of Ceylon, Good Hope PLC, Ceylon Beverage Holdings, and Lion Brewery (Ceylon) and many unquoted companies including Millers Brewery, Agro Bukit, and Pubs 'N Places (Private) Ltd.

=== Quoted subsidiaries ===
Subsidiary	Holding	Incorporation
Shalimar (Malay) PLC	99.25%	1909
Selinsing PLC	95.68%	1907
Indo-Malay PLC	87.14%	1906
Good Hope PLC	90.91%	1910
Ceylon Beverage Holdings PLC	75.62%	1910
Lion Brewery (Ceylon) PLC	59.61%	1996
Ceylon Guardian Investment Trust PLC	67.15%	1951
Ceylon Investment PLC	65.29%	1919
Pegasus Hotels of Ceylon PLC	89.98%	1966
Equity Two PLC	88.81%	1990

Source: Annual Report, 2022/23

== Operations ==
The company engaged in businesses in oil palm plantations, beverage, portfolio and asset management, real estate, and leisure sectors and operates in Sri Lanka, Indonesia, Malaysia and India. During the COVID-19 pandemic, the company provided LKR20 million worth of equipment for enhancing PCR testing capabilities to the Ministry of Health. In the year ended on 31 March 2020, the Carson Cumberbatch group incurred a collective loss of LKR 2.65 billion and despite the losses, none of the employees lost jobs or had to take pay cuts.

== See also ==
- List of companies listed on the Colombo Stock Exchange
- List of Sri Lankan public corporations by market capitalisation
