= Biyagama =

Biyagama බියගම பியகம
- suburb
- Location within Sri Lanka
- Coordinates: 6°56′N 79°59′E
- Country: Sri Lanka
- Province: Western Province
- Time zone: UTC+5:30 (Sri Lanka Standard Time)

Biyagama (Sinhala: බියගම, Tamil: பியகம) is a suburb in Gampaha District, situated in the Western Province of Sri Lanka. It is 12 miles from Colombo. A Free Trade Zone was established in Biyagama in 1985. "Kaduwela" interchange of expressway is located on Biyagama to Peliyagoda road.

== See also ==
- Biyagama Water Treatment Plant
