= LankaPay =

Payment clearing system in Sri Lanka

- Formerly: LankaClear
- Industry: Banking; Financial services
- Founded: 1 April 2002; 24 years ago
- Headquarters: Colombo 07, Sri Lanka
- Key people: L.H.A. Lakshman Silva (Chairman); Channa de Silva (CEO)
- Parent: Central Bank of Sri Lanka
- Website: www.lankapay.net

LankaPay (formerly LankaClear) national payment network of Sri Lanka which provides the central payment infrastructure to the country's financial sector. Established in April 1, 2002, the organization is owned by the Central Bank of Sri Lanka (CBSL) and all CBSL-licensed commercial banks in the country.

== Shareholders ==
As at April 2025, below are the shareholders of LankaPay:

Bank	Shareholding
Central Bank of Sri Lanka	19.59%
Hatton National Bank	14.52%
People's Bank	13.94%
Bank of Ceylon	13.86%
Sampath Bank	13.11%
Seylan Bank	6.6%
Commercial Bank of Ceylon	6.56%
HSBC Sri Lanka	1.31%
NDB Bank	0.99%
Standard Chartered Bank	0.99%
Nations Trust Bank	0.98%
Deutsche Bank	0.98%
Indian Bank	0.66%
Indian Overseas Bank	0.66%
MCB Bank	0.66%
Pan Asia Bank	0.66%
Citibank	0.66%
DFCC Bank	0.66%
Public Bank Berhad	0.66%
Bank of China	0.33%
Cargills Bank	0.33%
Amana Bank	0.33%
State Bank of India	0.33%
Habib Bank Limited	0.33%
Union Bank of Colombo	0.33%

== CITS ==
In May 2006, LankaPay launched the Cheque Imaging and Truncation System (CITS), a groundbreaking platform that facilitates the electronic presentment and clearance of cheque images. The introduction of CITS positioned Sri Lanka as the first country in South Asia and the second worldwide to implement such an advanced payment and settlement infrastructure, enabling nationwide cheque clearance on a T+1 basis where beneficiaries can encash a cheque on the next business day.

Operating under the provisions of the Payment and Settlement Systems Act No. 28 of 2005, which outlines procedures for automated cheque clearing, CITS revolutionized the traditional clearing process by transitioning from physical cheque handling to an image-based clearing mode. This significant development reduced the clearing cycle from three to five days to just one working day, primarily by eliminating the need for physical movement of the instruments. This has also enabled the banks to offer extended time for their customers to submit cheques, which has provided greater convenience to all banking customers.

== SLIPS ==
The Sri Lanka Interbank Payment System (or SLIPS in short) is the largest account-to-account fund transfer network in Sri Lanka. Created by LankaClear, it enables member banks to carry out same-day transfers of up to Rs. 5 million, in a secure paperless process.

== CCAPS ==
Launched under the brand name LankaPay in July 2013, the Common Card and Payment Switch (CCAPS) is the first phase of creating a more robust, efficient, and secure payment infrastructure for Sri Lanka. The Central Bank of Sri Lanka has since approved the CCAPS as Sri Lanka's "National Payment Switch".

CCAPS can be further divided into the following areas:

- LankaPay Common ATM Switch (CAS)
- LankaPay Shared ATM Switch (SAS)
- LankaPay National Card Scheme (NCS)
- LankaPay Common Electronic Fund Transfer Switch (CEFTS)
- LankaPay Common POS Switch (CPS)
- Common Mobile Switch (CMobS)

As per the Payments and Settlements Systems Circular No. 7 of 2015 issued by the Central Bank dated 30 November 2015, all licensed banks in Sri Lanka should join the CAS, CEFTS, CPS, and CMobS networks by 31 March 2016, 30 September 2016, 31 December 2016, and 30 September 2017, respectively.

=== Common ATM Switch ===
The Common ATM Switch (or CAS in short), is an interbank ATM network that allows participating banks to use each other's ATMs for free or at a minimal charge. The system was launched in July 2013 with BOC and People's Bank, with the first transaction carried out by the former governor of the Central Bank Ajith Nivard Cabraal, and deputy governor Ananda Silva. The aim of CAS is to create a single unified ATM network in Sri Lanka.

As at March 2016, twelve banks have joined the LankaPay CAS network, expanding the countrywide member ATMs to over 3,000 and making LankaPay the largest ATM network in the country. Member banks include BOC, Cargills Bank, Commercial Bank, HNB, Habib Bank, National Savings Bank, Nations Trust Bank, NDB, People's Bank, Regional Development Bank, Sampath Bank, Seylan Bank, Standard Chartered Bank and Union Bank.

=== Common Electronic Fund Transfer Switch ===
The Common Electronic Fund Transfer Switch (or CEFTS) for short is a fully automated paperless fund transfer system which allows instantaneous fund transfers between member banks.

Maximum Customer Charges (LKR) as of 7 February 2025
Internet Banking	Mobile Banking	ATM (Same Bank)	ATM (Other Banks)	Over the Counter
Rs.25	Rs.25	Rs.25	Rs.100	Rs.100

== See also ==
- Banking in Sri Lanka
- List of banks in Sri Lanka
- GovPay
