= Women Friendly Workplace Awards =

Award for organisations that empower female professionals in Sri Lanka

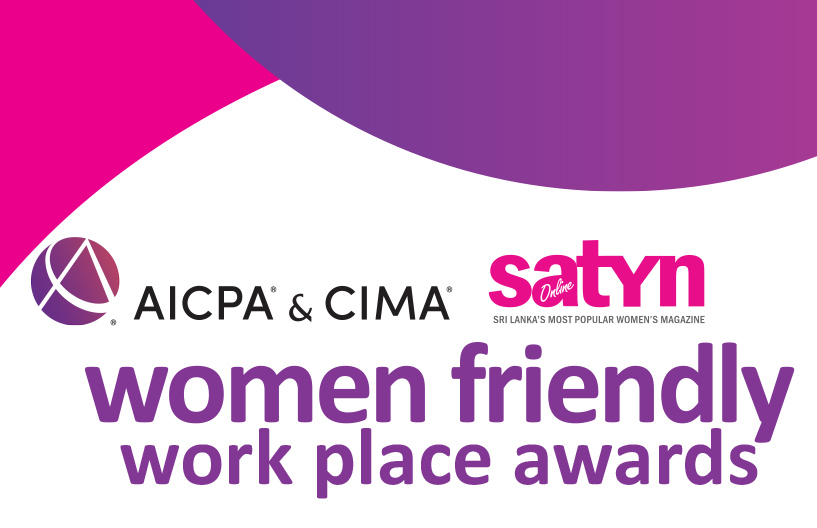
- Date: Inaugural event was held on 2 November 2021
- Location: Colombo
- Awards: Top 10 Places to Work for Women

Women Friendly Workplace Awards (shortened to WFWA Awards), is Sri Lanka's first-ever gender equality accolade. It recognises woman-friendly workplaces: public and private organisations that encourage and empower women at the workplace in Sri Lanka. It was inaugurated in 2021, with it first being held on 2 November 2021, at the Cinnamon Grand. It was initiated by Satyn Magazine and AICPA & CIMA

WFWA 2022 was held on the 30 September, at the Kingsbury Hotel, Colombo.

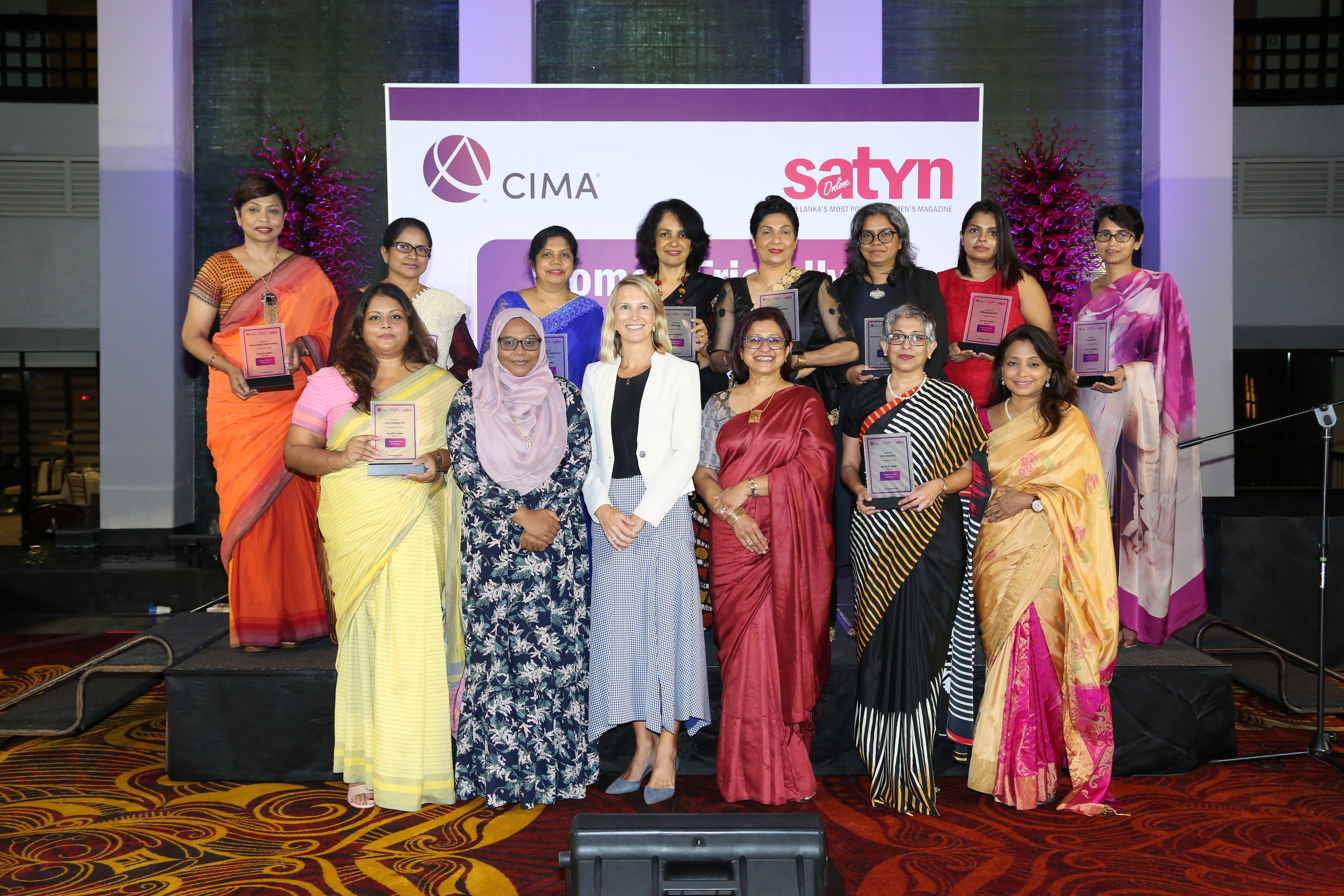
WFWA Recipients

== Prize categories ==
- Top 10 Places to Work for Women
- Honourable Mentions

== 2021 ==
The inaugural award show was held on 2 November 2021 at Cinnamon Grand, at the Atrium Lobby. The Top Ten winners were AIA, CBL, Commercial Bank, London Stock Exchange Business Services, NSB, People's Bank, Seylan Bank, DFCC, HNB Assurance, and LOLC.

Following which Honourable Mentions were awarded to NDB, SDB, Acuity Knowledge Partners, Bio Foods and WNS Global Services.

The Chief Guest was Ms. Sarah Twigg (Programme Manager – Women in Work – Sri Lanka at IFC), and the Guest of Honour was Ms Farzana Jameel PC (Senior Additional Solicitor General of the Attorney General's Department).

The panel of judges included – Ravi Abeysuriya, Manohari Abeysekera, Dumindra Ratnayaka, Prof. Arosha Adikaram, Jeevan Thyagarajah, Zahara Ansary and Nayomini R. Weerasooriya.

The awards aimed to help achieve Sri Lanka's commitment to 5 SDG; which aims to provide women equal rights and opportunities, including the right to live free without discrimination, this includes workplace discrimination, and any other sort of violence.

== 2022 ==
=== Pre-Networking Event ===
WFWA commenced its 2nd edition, starting off with an networking and learning event, which was held on 25 March 2022 at Hotel Ramada, Colombo. The event panel consisted of Ms. Avanthi Colombage, Ms. Sandra De Zoysa, Ms Ananya Sabharwal, Ms. Sarah Twigg, and Nayomini R. Weerasooriya.

=== 2nd Edition ===
The 2nd edition of the WFWA was held on 30 September, at the Kingsbury Hotel, Colombo.

The Panel of Judges, was headed by Prof. Arosha Adikaram - Chair Professor in HR Management, University of Colombo. The other Judges were Ken Vijayakumar - President CIPM Sri Lanka & DGM – HR at Baurs, Zahara Ansary - Country Manager, for CIMA in Sri Lanka, Dr. Beshan Kulapala - Tech Entrepreneur and Nayomini R. Weerasooriya - Founder/Editor of Satyn Magazine.

== 2023 ==
WFWA 2023 edition was officially launched on March 1 2023, jointly presented by Satyn Magazine and AICPA & CIMA. The presentation of a Paper on 'Good Practices for Women that sheds light on the Status of Women in the Sri Lankan Workplace', marked the launch of the 2023 edition.

== Recipients ==
Year	Award	Winner
2021	Top 10 Places to Work for Women	AIA, CBL, Commercial Bank, DFCC, HNB Assurance, LOLC, London Stock Exchange Business Services, NSB, People's Bank and Seylan Bank.
2021	Honourable Mentions	Acuity Knowledge Partners, NDB, SDB, Bio Foods and WNS Global Services.

== See also ==
- List of awards honoring women
- List of business and industry awards
