= Ceylinco Insurance =

Sri Lankan conglomerate holding company

Ceylinco Holdings PLC
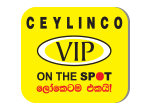
- The logo of Ceylinco General Insurance
- Company type: Public
- Traded as: CSE: CINS.N0000
- ISIN: LK0176N00004
- Industry: Insurance; Education; Renewable energy
- Founded: 1987; 39 years ago
- Headquarters: Colombo, Sri Lanka
- Key people: Ajith R. Gunawardena (Executive Chairman/Chief Executive Officer); R. Renganathan (Deputy Chairman)
- Revenue: ▲LKR77.020 billion (2022)
- Operating income: ▲LKR16.281 billion (2022)
- Net income: ▲LKR13.256 billion (2022)
- Total assets: ▲LKR261.680 billion (2022)
- Total equity: ▲LKR81.895 billion (2022)
- Owner: Global Rubber Industries (Pvt) Ltd (22.25%); Mitsui Sumitomo Insurance Company Ltd (15.00%); Banque Pictet and Cie SA/Patrick Schegg (10.73%)
- Number of employees: ▼3,767 (2022)
- Subsidiaries: See text
- Website: http://ceylincoholdings.com

Ceylinco Holdings PLC is the largest private sector insurance company in Sri Lanka. The company is also engaged in the education and renewable energy sectors. The company offers both life insurance and all classes of general insurance. The company was incorporated in 1987 when the government ended its state monopoly over the insurance sector and the company was listed on the Colombo Stock Exchange the following year. Ceylinco Insurance is an LMD 100 company, an annual list of public companies in Sri Lanka by revenue and ranked 23rd in the 2020/21 edition.

== History ==
The company traces its origin to the founding of Ceylon Insurance Company by Hugh C. Weeresekere in 1939. Due to an illness, Weeresekere left the company to Justin Kotelawala, who managed the company for 25 years. The insurance industry in Sri Lanka was a state monopoly from its nationalisation in the 1960s to 1988. Prior to the independence of Sri Lanka, the industry was dominated by the private sector and the industry was led by Ceylon Insurance Company. In 1987, Ceylon Insurance Company was renamed Ceylinco Ltd. and incorporated as a limited liability company. In 2008, Golden Key Credit Card Co., a subsidiary of Ceylico Insurance's parent Ceylinco Consolidated, crashed. The board of directors of Ceylinco Consolidated, including Chairman Lalith Kotelawala, was indicted for 91 charges.

Pictet & Cie, a Swiss private bank acquired 10.68% of the company's shares in 2009. In 2014, Ceylinco Insurance emerged as the second-largest insurer by assets in the country. Ceylinco controlled 22.6% of total insurance assets behind Sri Lanka Insurance Corporation's 40%. Global Rubber Industries (Pvt) Ltd, the largest shareholder of the company sought legal action against the board of directors of the company alleging irregular deals and payments. Global Rubber Industries (Pvt) Ltd alleged that the directors had compensated themselves more than three other private insurance companies combined while paying less in dividends. The Commercial High Court rejected all 15 interim orders sought by Global Rubber Industries. The company was included in S&P Sri Lanka 20 Index in June 2018. To mark the occasion, managing director cum CEO Ajith Gunawardena rang the opening bell of the Colombo Stock Exchange on 26 June 2018.

== Operations ==
The company invested LKR40 million in building La Serena, a retirement community resort in Uswetakeiyawa. Ceylinco Insurance was ranked 9th in the Most Respected and Admired Corporates list, compiled by LMD in 2021. Ceylinco Life retained its position as the most valuable life insurance brand with a brand value of LKR3.8 billion in 2022. Meanwhile, Ceylinco General became a close second in the most valuable general insurance provider with a brand value of LKR3.6 billion against the market leader, Sri Lanka Insurance's LKR4.1 billion brand value. Ceylinco Life ranked 28th and Ceylinco General 31st in overall brand valuation rankings. At 16th SLIM-Kantar Peoples Awards in 2022, the company was voted as the most popular life insurance provider. In 2022, Ceylico Life was recognized as one of the ten best workplaces by the Great Place to Work network.

== Subsidiaries ==
Ceylinco Insurance controls a number of subsidiaries.

Subsidiaries of Ceylinco Insurance
Subsidiary	Stake
Serene Resorts Ltd	100%
Ceylinco Healthcare Services Ltd	99%
Ceylinco Investcorp (Pvt) Ltd	75%
Ceylinco Insurance Company (Pvt) Ltd (Maldives)	79%
Energy Lanka Holdings Ltd	100%
International College of Business & Technology Ltd	64%
Ceylinco General Insurance Ltd	100%
Ceylinco Life Insurance Ltd	100%
CEG Education Holdings (Pvt) Ltd	63%
American Education Centre Ltd	41%

Source: Annual Report, 2021

== See also ==
- List of Sri Lankan public corporations by market capitalisation
