= Loganathan =

Loganathan லோகநாதன்
- Pronunciation: Lōkanātaṉ
- Gender: Male
- Language: Tamil

Origin
- Meaning: Lord of All worlds
- Region of origin: Southern India; North-eastern Sri Lanka

Other names
- Alternative spelling: Loganadan

Loganathan (Tamil: லோகநாதன்) is a Tamil male given name. Due to the Tamil tradition of using patronymic surnames it may also be a surname for males and females. Loganathan is the Tamil equivalent of Loknath meaning "Lord of All worlds".

== Notable people ==
=== Given name ===
- A. D. Loganathan (1888–1949), Indian soldier
- C. Loganathan (1913–1981), Ceylonese banker
- G. V. Loganathan (1954–2007), American engineer and academic

=== Surname ===
- Kethesh Loganathan (1952–2006), Sri Lankan political activist
- Loganathan Arumugam (1953–2007), Malaysian singer
- Thiruchi Loganathan, Indian singer
- Trichy Loganathan Maharajan (born 1960), Indian singer
