= LOLC =

LOLC may refer to the following topics:

- LOLC Holdings, Sri Lankan conglomerate
- LOLC Finance, Sri Lankan financial company
- LOLC Cambodia, Sri Lankan bank

== See also ==
- Lol (disambiguation)
- LOL
- LOLCODE
