= LankaQR =

QR code payment system in Sri Lanka

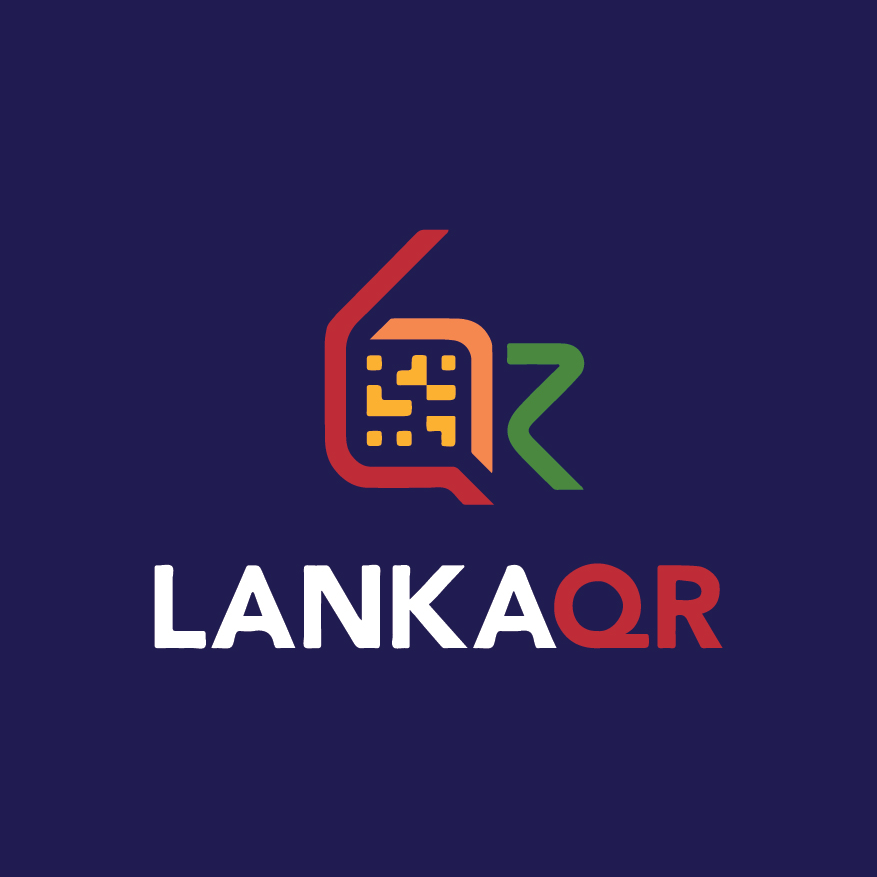
- Product type: QR code payment
- Current owner: Central Bank of Sri Lanka (CBSL)
- Country: Sri Lanka
- Introduced: 12 October 2018; 8 years ago
- Markets: Sri Lanka
- Website: www.cbsl.gov.lk

LankaQR, stylised in all caps as LANKAQR, is a national QR code payment system in Sri Lanka, initiated by the Central Bank of Sri Lanka (CBSL) in collaboration with LankaClear (Pvt) Ltd and licensed financial institutions. The standard was introduced on 9 October 2018 and formally launched on 11 March 2019, aiming to promote a cashless society, enhance financial inclusion, and reduce reliance on physical cash, particularly for small and medium-sized enterprises (SMEs).

== History ==
LankaQR was introduced as a standardised QR code payment system on 12 October 2018, based on the EMV QR Code Specification for Payment Systems (Merchant-Presented Mode), an industry framework developed by EMVCo. The CBSL issued a circular on 11 March 2019, replacing an earlier 2018 circular, mandating compliance within two months for all financial institutions offering QR code payments. Nationwide campaigns, such as රට පුරාම LankaQR in 2020 and LankaQR ජනගතකරණය in 2021, aimed to onboard merchants and promote digital payments.

In 2024, LankaQR expanded to support international payment systems, including China’s Alipay and India’s Unified Payments Interface (UPI), enabling Chinese and Indian tourists to make payments at over 350,000 merchant points. Plans for a 2025 relaunch aim to address adoption barriers, such as high transaction fees, and integrate LankaQR with digital identity and expressway toll payment systems.

== Functionality ==
LankaQR enables customers to make payments by scanning QR codes at merchant outlets using mobile apps provided by certified financial institutions or payment providers. Transactions are processed instantly, with no fees charged to customers, though merchants may incur a Merchant Discount Rate (MDR), initially set at up to 1% but adjustable by market forces. The system supports payments from various account types, including savings, credit cards, and e-money accounts, and is compatible with Android (operating system) and iOS devices.

Merchants receive QR code stickers from certified acquirers, and transactions are routed through LankaClear when the issuer and acquirer differ. In 2021, the CBSL reported 21 certified financial institutions and 24 mobile apps supporting LankaQR. Advanced implementations include Android-based POS devices supporting LankaQR, launched by the Commercial Bank of Ceylon in collaboration with PAYable.

== Impact and Challenges ==
LankaQR has been recognized for reducing cash management costs and formalising the informal economy, with SMEs, which contribute 52% to Sri Lanka's GDP, as key beneficiaries. Its development saved approximately Rs. 1.5 billion by using local expertise instead of foreign consultancy. The system supports tourism, with projections to onboard 65,000 merchants for Indian tourists by March 2024.

However, adoption challenges persist. High transaction fees, such as the 1% MDR, have deterred merchants, and cash remains dominant in Sri Lanka. Limited access to affordable smartphones and internet connectivity hinders adoption among grassroots communities. To address these challenges, the CBSL has introduced fee waivers, such as Hatton National Bank’s elimination of MDR for merchants during the 2025 Awurudu season, and educational campaigns, including a 2022 webinar series.

== Future Developments ==
The Ministry of Digital Economy plans to relaunch LankaQR in 2025, addressing adoption barriers and integrating it with digital identity systems and expressway toll payments. The CBSL is also working with international payment apps, such as Thailand’s LINE Pay to allow Thai foreigners to use LankaQR, with further arrangements in progress as of January 2024. Partnerships with Alipay and WeChat Pay aim to support Chinese tourists, with over 400,000 merchants expected to benefit. The government also seeks to digitize government payments through the GovPay platform, further promoting a cashless society.
