= HDFC =

HDFC may refer to:

- Housing Development Finance Corporation, an Indian mortgage company
- HDFC Bank, an Indian financial services company
- HDFC Life, a joint venture of Housing Development Finance Corporation and Standard Life plc
- HDFC Bank of Sri Lanka, a Sri Lankan specialised housing bank
- Housing Development Fund Corporation, a special type of limited equity housing cooperative in New York City
