= TKS Finance =

Sri Lankan finance company

- Company type: Public
- Industry: Finance
- Founded: 2009
- Key people: Abdul Azim (Chairman)
- Website: www.tksfinance.com

TKS Finance Limited is a Sri Lankan public limited company which worked as a licensed finance company accepting deposits from general public. It served as one of the licensed finance companies in Sri Lanka since commencing the operations in 2011. On 19 September 2019, Central Bank of Sri Lanka decided to cancel the license of the company due to insufficient capital and financial problems regarding repaying depositors' money on demand as well as before maturity.

== Corporate history ==
The TKS Finance was incorporated as a public limited company in 2009 but started its operations two years later after incorporation on 17 June 2011. The company was started mainly through the funding from Malaysian investors. The company was licensed by the Monetary Board of the Central Bank of Sri Lanka under the Finance Business Act no 42 of 2011. As of 2019, the company had about 12 branches across the country.

Rasika Kaluarachchi served as the first CEO of the company and in 2018 Abdul Azim was appointed as new chairman of TKS Finance.

== See also ==
- List of banks in Sri Lanka
