= Kishan Musafer =

Sri Lankan rugby union player

Kishan Musafer is a former Sri Lankan rugby union player who played as a winger. He is also a banker and corporate trainer apart from having an illustrious career in rugby. He represented Sri Lanka rugby union and rugby sevens teams from 1997 to 2004 in a career spanning nearly eight years. He holds the distinction of being part of both Sri Lanka's fifteen a side traditional rugby union team as well as national rugby sevens team.

== Career ==
He played school rugby for his alma mater Wesley College, Colombo for whom he played in the crucial position as a centre and wing three quarter during Interschools Rugby Championships. During the final year of his college rugby career, he was coached by some of the veteran rugby players of Sri Lanka including the likes of Summa Navaratnam. He had captained the Ceylonese Rugby & Football Club in domestic rugby league competition.

He eventually went onto play for Sri Lanka national under 19 fifteen a side rugby team in the Junior Asian Rugby Championships. He was selected to represent Sri Lanka schools rugby team at the 1994 Pan Pacific Youth Rugby Championships which was held in Chinese Taipei where Sri Lanka finished the campaign at sixth place out of nine nations.

He subsequently made his international debut for Sri Lanka in 1997 while he was still playing as a prominent member of the Ceylonese Rugby & Football Club. He made his Commonwealth Games debut representing Sri Lanka at the 1998 Commonwealth Games and was part of the national rugby sevens team during the multi-sport event where Sri Lanka eventually lost to powerhouses New Zealand and then to hosts Malaysia. He then reflected on facing legendary rugby stalwart Jonah Lomu when Sri Lanka locked horns with the All Blacks at the 1998 Commonwealth Games as the greatest moment in his sporting career. He also competed at the 2002 Commonwealth Games representing the national rugby sevens team. He last featured for the national team in 2004 in international rugby.

Following his retirement from rugby, he joined Hatton National Bank and later joined the data processing unit at HSBC. He also had stints working for MAS Holdings and served as marketing manager at Thermo Plastics. He currently works at Amana Bank as a relationship manager at the Prestige Banking Centre. He obtained his master's degree in Business Administration from the Cardiff University. He also holds certified trainer holding in an Advanced Diploma in Teaching and Training from the City and Guilds UK.

He was appointed as rugby board secretary of the Ceylonese Rugby & Football Club during 2017/18 annual general meeting of the club where office bearers were chosen for the calendar year.

In April 2023, he was appointed as one of the members in the interim committee by sports minister Roshan Ranasinghe to run the operational activities and affairs of Sri Lanka Rugby.
