= Alliance Against Sexual Harassment =

Non-government Organization Alliance

Founded in 2001, Alliance Against Sexual Harassment (AASHA) is an alliance of non-government organizations (NGOs) including Action Aid Pakistan, Bedari, Working Women's Support Centre, Working Women Association, Federal Women's Welfare Agency, Conscience Promoters, Pakistan Institute of Labour Education & Research, and Working Women Organisation. AASHA is a non-governmental organization operating in Lahore and Karachi which raises awareness regarding sexual harassment and lobbies the policymakers to take action against it.

== History ==
Dr. Fouzia Saeed, a founding member of AASHA, assisted in drafting a code of conduct for the workplace, which has served as the foundation of the anti-harassment bill. AASHA first drew up the code of conduct in 2003. It was implemented for test purposes in various companies, such as Attock Refinery, McDonald's, and Shell. Later, the private sector, labor unions, academia, civil society, and the government were consulted, and their suggestions were incorporated. The final version of the bill was presented to the government in March 2008 and approved by the cabinet in principle in November 2008. After making some changes, the cabinet formally approved it in February 2010. It was then tabled in the National Assembly in April and handed over to the law and women's development committees.

== The Protection Against Harassment at the Workplace Act 2009 ==
The bill defines sexual harassment as “any unwelcome sexual advance, request for sexual favours or other verbal or written communication or physical conduct of a sexual nature or sexually demeaning attitudes, causing interference with work performance or creating an intimidating, hostile, or offensive work environment or the attempt to punish the complainant for refusal to comply to such a request or to make it a condition for employment."

== Objectives ==
AASHA means "hope"—a hope to root out harassment, especially of women, from society.

It aims to raise awareness on the issue and assist the government and private sectors to create a society free of sexual harassment. AASHA's first initiative is directed towards taking active measures to mobilize and influence policymakers for providing protection to women at the workplace and ensuring a safe and healthy working environment.

== Recognition awards ==
Every year AASHA holds a ceremony in Karachi to recognize ten most gender-friendly companies. For the first three years, many companies like Johnson and Johnson, Pakistan State Oil, Avari Towers, and GEO have gotten these awards.

== Cultural impact ==
AASHA assisted and drafted a code of conduct for the workplace, and it has served as the foundation of the anti-harassment bill. Due to AASHA's consistent efforts, for the first time in Pakistan, a new Law was enacted: “The Protection Against Harassment of Women at Workplace Act, 2010.” This was the first time that sexual harassment has been defined in Pakistan through a legislative instrument.

Before this enactment, there was no clear definition of harassment, whether in public, or private workplaces. Section 509 of Pakistan Penal Code 1860, talked about “insulting the modesty” of a woman before AASHA legally drafted the code of conduct at the workplace, but there was no clear definition of "modesty." Moreover, there was no law to prohibit harassment in the workplace.

== Publications ==
- The Code of Conduct for Gender Justice at the Workplace (In Urdu)
- The AASHA Experience
- Leaders of Change
- Feeling Vulnerable In the Houses of Learning
- A Baseline Study on Anti-Sexual Harassment Policies
- The Code of Conduct for Gender Justice at the Workplace
- Guidelines for an Environment Free from Discrimination & Harassment
- Situational Analysis on Sexual Harassment
- Sexual Harassment at the workplace National Conference
