= Mythili Raman =

American lawyer

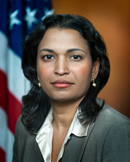

Acting Assistant Attorney General for the Criminal Division
- In office March 1, 2013 – May 15, 2014
- President: Barack Obama
- Preceded by: Lanny Breuer
- Succeeded by: Leslie Caldwell

Personal details
- Education: Yale University (BA); University of Chicago (JD)

Mythili Raman is an American lawyer and the former acting assistant attorney general for the United States Department of Justice's Criminal Division.

== Early life and family ==
Mythili is the daughter of Athishdam Tharmaratnam and granddaughter of C. Loganathan, former general manager of the Bank of Ceylon. Her parents are originally from Vadamarachchi in northern Sri Lanka.

Mythili graduated summa cum laude from Yale University in 1991 with a B.A. degree. She attended the University of Chicago Law School and graduated with an honors J.D. degree in 1994.

== Career ==
Mythili's legal career started as a law clerk for Francis Dominic Murnaghan, Jr., federal judge on the United States Court of Appeals for the Fourth Circuit. She joined the United States Department of Justice in 1996 as a trial attorney in the Criminal Division's Narcotic and Dangerous Drug Section. She was assistant united states attorney in the U.S. Attorney's Office for the District of Maryland between 1999 and 2008. In 2006 she was temporarily assigned to the Deputy Attorney General's office as senior counsel.

Mythili joined the Criminal Division in August 2008 as acting chief of staff. She was principal deputy assistant attorney general and chief of staff from September 2, 2009, to March 1, 2013. She was appointed acting assistant attorney general for the Criminal Division on March 1, 2013.

Mythili is currently a partner at Covington & Burling, where she co-chairs the firm's white collar defense and investigations practice group.
