= HDFC Bank of Sri Lanka =

Specialised bank in Sri Lanka

HDFC Bank of Sri Lanka PLC
- Logo of HDFC Bank of Sri Lanka
- Company type: Public
- Traded as: CSE: HDFC.N0000
- ISIN: LK0339N00008
- Industry: Financial services
- Founded: 1984; 41 years ago
- Headquarters: Colombo, Sri Lanka
- Number of locations: 39 branches (5,845 ATMs) (2022)
- Key people: P.J. Jayasinghe (Chairman); Hemal Chaminda Lokugeegana (CEO/General Manager)
- Revenue: ▲LKR8,878 million (2022)
- Operating income: ▲LKR2,266 million (2022)
- Net income: ▼LKR326 million (2022)
- Total assets: ▼LKR62,882 million (2022)
- Total equity: ▲LKR6,716 million (2022)
- Owners: National Housing Development Authority (49.73%); LOLC Holdings (15.00%); Thurston Investments Ltd. (14.15%)
- Number of employees: ▼588 (2022)
- Website: hdfc.lk

The Housing Development Finance Corporation Bank of Sri Lanka PLC, commonly abbreviated as HDFC Bank of Sri Lanka PLC, is a specialised housing bank in Sri Lanka. The bank commenced operations in 1984 as a building society. Through successive acts in the Parliament of Sri Lanka over the years, the bank transformed into a state-owned enterprise, then a specialised bank and a listed company on the Colombo Stock Exchange in 2005. Since widening its scope of business in 2011, the bank established itself as a supporter of small and medium-sized enterprises. The government of Sri Lanka holds 51% of the bank's stocks, mainly through the National Housing Development Authority. HDFC Bank is one of the LMD 100 companies in Sri Lanka. The bank ranked 78th in the 2020/21 edition. Brand Finance calculated the brand value of HDFC Bank to be LKR763 million in 2022. Due to the effects of the Sri Lankan economic crisis, Fitch Ratings placed the bank along with twelve other Sri Lankan banks on Rating Watch Negative.

== History ==
The Housing Development Finance Corporation (HDFC) was incorporated in December 1983 as a building society. The HDFC was established under the National Housing Act No. 37 of 1957 and it commenced operations in June 1984. The Housing Development Finance Corporation of Sri Lanka Act No. 7 of 1997 passed in the parliament of Sri Lanka. Under the act, the HDFC was established as a state-owned enterprise. The act was amended in 2003, allowing the HDFC to reestablish itself as a specialised bank. The bank was listed on the Colombo Stock Exchange in 2005. Beginning in 2011, the bank broadened its scope of operations to enter into new market segments of banking.

Due to the bank's success in supporting micro, small and medium-scaled enterprises prompted the bank to establish a separate unit to focus on micro, small and medium-scaled enterprises. The bank signed a mandate for the issuance of listed debentures with the People's Bank in 2013. The debenture issuance was rated by Fitch Ratings as 'BBB(lka)'. In 2014, HDFC Bank's then-chairperson, Siromi Wickramasinghe was named among the 50 Most Powerful Women in Sri Lanka by the business magazine, Echelon.

== Operations ==
The government of Sri Lanka holds a controlling stake of 51% of the bank's stocks. The National Housing Development Authority holds a 49.73% stake. Despite the effects of the COVID-19 pandemic, the bank posted an LKR978 million profit before tax in 2020. The bank offered 21,000 debt moratoriums amounting to LKR17 billion in the same year. Fitch Ratings affirmed its BB+(lka) credit rating of the bank in September 2021. The credit outlook was adjudged as stable. However, Fitch placed the bank along with twelve other banks in Sri Lanka on Rating Watch Negative. The rating agency considered the banks' foreign currency funding and liquidity positions to be volatile amid poor creditor confidence as a result of the Sri Lankan economic crisis. HDFC Bank won the merit award at the 2021 National Business Excellence Awards organised by the National Chamber of Commerce of Sri Lanka.

The HDFC Bank signed a memorandum of understanding with JAT Holdings, to offer low-interest loans for wood craftsmen and professional painters who are doing business with JAT Holdings.

== See also ==
- List of banks in Sri Lanka
- List of companies listed on the Colombo Stock Exchange
