= Fusion – Sarvodaya ICT4D Movement =

ICT4D movement

Fusion is the ICT (Information and Communications Technology) for Development (ICT4D) movement of Sarvodaya, Sri Lanka, the leading NGO, serving over 15,000 villages. The name Sarvodaya is taken from the Sanskrit meaning of 'awakening (udaya) of all (sarva)', and roots back to the Gandhian ideals. Fusion, as implied by the true meaning of the word, envisages the fusion of the vision and mission of Sarvodaya into the broader development scenario, using Information and Communication technologies (ICT) as a common fabric. Thus, Fusion is identified as the ICT for Development (ICT4D) movement of Sarvodaya.

Fusion primarily, but not exclusively, works with the villages that have already been socially and economically uplifted through diverse community development programs carried out over a period of time. Thus they are better prepared to connect with the Information Age. For instance a community having a registered society, with a healthy track record of micro-finance activities is recognized as better prepared to interact with digital technologies.

Fusion partners with multiple institutions including the State (Information and Communication Technology Agency of Sri Lanka), corporate, academic and civil organizations.

== Vision ==
The project's vision is the e-Empowerment of rural poor communities.

Fusion's broader mission is founded on the following three pillars;

- Practice: keeping 'Community' first, and listening and recognizing the needs of the people, Fusion plans and implements programs as a response to their needs.
- Partnership: Fusion trusts and values the interdependence, sharing and sense of cooperation of the donors, educational establishments, state and corporate institutions that are carrying out the programs.
- Research: Fusion updates its development tools deriving information from the research. For instance, on one hand it seeks to adapt North-born technologies to the less well developed South. On the other hand, it strives to add value to indigenous wisdom and amplify the voices of the voiceless people of the South.

== History ==
The program builds on the pioneering telecenter, that has been trialled by the Social Empowerment Program of Sarvodaya, in 1997, at a remote township (Kahawatta) of Ratnapura District, Sri Lanka.

Since it started it has progressed through a remarkable learning curve;

- Pilot testing and setting up of first ever Telecentre in Sri Lanka - 1997
- Formulation of Village Information Centre (VIC) concept and replication around the country - 1999
- First donor funded ICT program (by UNESCO Appeal) - 2003
- Initial partnership with Governments ICT program (eSriLanka) - 2003
- Developing Subsidy Voucher for the eSriLanka program - 2004
- Expansion of telecentre program with introduction of community scholarships (with Microsoft-UP) - 2004
- Beginning of ICT4D Research Program - ‘Virtual Villages; Socio-anthropological and technological study on last mile’ - 2004
- Setting up Telecentre Family Network (in collaboration with eSrilanka program) as an apex telecentre alliance - 2006
- Design and implementation of Agri-clinics as a farmer centric information delivery mechanism - 2006
- Sarvodaya-Fusion being elected as the Regional Coordinator for GKP (Global Knowledge Partnership) South Asia - 2006 May
- Launch of Sarvodaya-Fusion as a specialized ICT4D program of Sarvodaya - 2006 May

== Programs ==
=== Village Information Centers (VIC) ===
Village Information Centers are simple community based libraries. Their unique features include:

- Simple, locally appropriate model
- Ability to adapt to diverse rural demands
- Community participation and ownership
- Ability to build community aspirations towards the digital age.

VICs are initiated by the youth leaders (volunteers) of rural villages. They are housed within low cost rural buildings, donated by the community. Some are maintained adjoining Sarvodaya Village Banks.

VICs accumulate and manage basic livelihood information related to health, transport, agriculture, education and governance.

There are VICs having enormous indigenous resources such as Traditional Medical Recipes (on Ola leaves), Indigenous crop harvest equipment, Storage systems, Traditional songs and books. Some VICs gather information related to local bio-diversity (birds, plant species etc.).

=== Telecentres ===
Telecentres are small units having a few computers and other ICT equipment located in rural districts. They provide internet access, ICT education and other IT services to rural communities.

The majority of the telecentres with which Fusion partners are owned by rural communities, (mostly sponsored by the State sponsored eSriLanka program). Fusion maintains a small network of telecentres to carry out pilot projects, the knowledge obtained from which can finally be adopted by the wider community.
