= Golden Key Credit Card Company =

Sri Lankan credit card company

Golden Key Credit Card Company Ltd (GKCCC)
- Type: Private
- Industry: Financial services
- Founded: June 3, 1977; 49 years ago
- Defunct: 2008
- Fate: Dissolved
- Headquarters: Colombo, Sri Lanka
- Key people: Lalith Kotelawala (Group Chairman)
- Services: Credit cards
- Parent: Ceylinco Consolidated

The Golden Key Credit Card Company (GKCCC) was a leading Sri Lankan financial institution specializing in credit card services, and a subsidiary of the Ceylinco Consolidated. Founded on June 3, 1977, it was a wholly owned subsidiary of the Ceylinco Group, an extensive conglomerate with more than 300 subsidiaries. GKCCC played a pioneering role in establishing the credit card industry in Sri Lanka in the early 1980s. Notably, it was responsible for setting up the initial Merchant Network utilized by all credit card companies in the country.

However, in 2008 it was revealed that the Chairman (Lalith Kotelawala ) and Board of Directors had engaged in a lengthy embezzlement scheme, spanning from 1999 to 2008. The embezzled sum amounted to a staggering Rs. 26.5 billion, approximately US$200 million, from 9,054 depositors. Consequently, these actions led to the indictment of the chairman and Directors on 91 charges, including criminal misappropriation and breach of trust.

This financial scandal had far-reaching consequences, impacting Sri Lanka's financial sector and leading to substantial regulatory reforms and increased scrutiny of the industry as a whole. This led to a severe liquidity crisis in the final weeks of 2008. The GKCCC scandal and its repercussions had a profound impact on Sri Lanka's financial sector, resulting in significant regulatory reforms and heightened industry oversight.

== History ==
GKCCC was established as a subsidiary of the Ceylinco Group and officially incorporated in June 1977. During the early 1980s, GKCCC led the way in the emergence of the credit card industry in Sri Lanka, contributing significantly to the sector's growth. The company's groundwork included setting up the initial merchant network, which later served as the blueprint for other credit card operators in the country.

GKCCC achieved several milestones in the Sri Lankan credit card industry:

- 1987 - it introduced Sri Lanka's first domestic Gold Card.
- 1991 - the company pioneered interest-free easy payment schemes.
- 1991 - GKCCC introduced the GK Executive Card, an entertainment-focused credit card, and the innovative Showbiz concept in 1991.
- 1997 - it became the first to offer promotions as a value-added service, including holiday weekend packages and foreign tours.
- 2000 - GKCCC launched the GK Privilege Card, a Discount Card.
- 2003 - it unveiled Sri Lanka's first domestic Platinum Card.

== GKCCC scandal (2008) ==
=== Legal proceedings and indictments ===
In 2008, GKCCC faced a major scandal when former Ceylinco Chairman Lalith Kotelawala and several members of the GKCCC Board of Directors were indicted in the Colombo High Court on a total of 91 charges. These charges included allegations of criminal misappropriation and criminal breach of trust. They were framed under the Penal Code and Finance Companies Act for offenses committed between March 1999 and December 2008. The indictment specifically accused GKCCC and its board members of conspiring to misappropriate funds, including deposits totaling Rs. 26 billion that belonged to the company.

=== Involvement of the Central Bank ===
The Central Bank of Sri Lanka also became entangled in the GKCCC case. In a Supreme Court order dated March 23, 2009, it was revealed that the head of the Special Investigations Unit (S.I.U) of the Central Bank had raised concerns about GKCCC's financial operations.

=== Impact and regulatory reforms ===
The GKCCC scandal sent shockwaves through Sri Lanka's financial sector and prompted substantial regulatory reforms, reflecting the need for increased scrutiny and oversight in the industry.

== See also ==
- List of banks in Sri Lanka
