= Satyn (magazine) =

Sri Lankan monthly magazine

Satyn Magazine
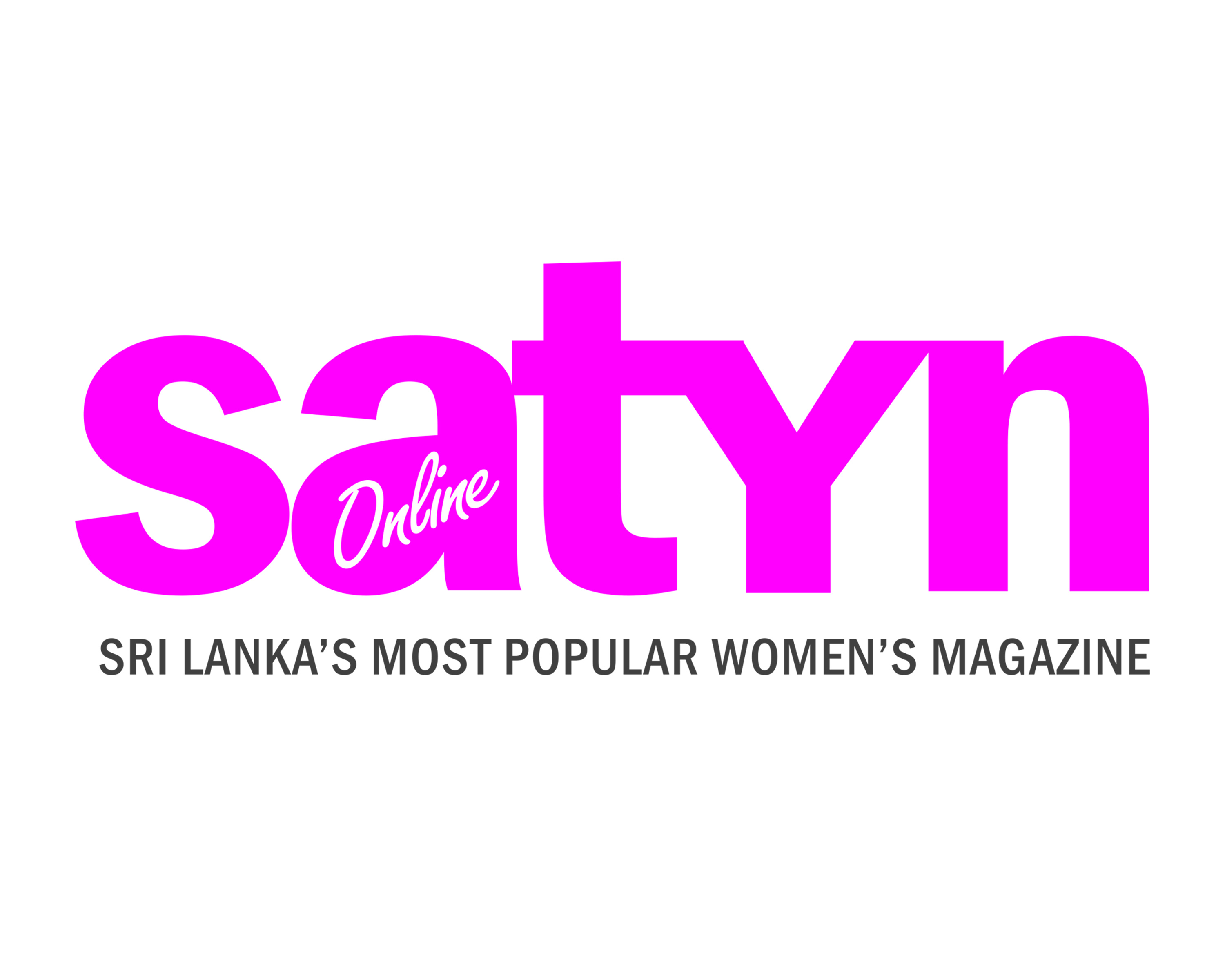
- Satyn Logo Since 2013
- Founder/Editor: Nayomini R. Weerasooriya
- Categories: Sri Lanka English Women's Magazine
- Frequency: Monthly (1998–2007); Online (2007–)
- Format: Digital Magazine (2007-); Print (1998 - 2007)
- First issue: December 1998; 27 years ago
- Country: Sri Lanka
- Based in: Colombo
- Language: English
- Website: www.satynmag.com

Satyn is an English Language Sri Lankan, monthly women's lifestyle magazine, that focuses on women's entrepreneurship, beauty, health, and fashion, first published in December 1998. It was in print from 1998 to 2007, following which Satyn went completely online.

== Women Friendly Workplace Awards ==
Satynmag pioneered Sri Lanka's first ever Women Friendly Workplace Awards with CIMA with a goal of adding value to the role of women in the Sri Lankan workplace. The Awards were inaugurated in 2021 - many Sri Lankan organisations took part in the Awards.

== Empowering Sri Lankan women entrepreneurs ==
Satynmag entered a global partnership with Catalyst for Women Entrepreneurship (CWE), an Indian women's entrepreneurship ecosystem. The partnership is aimed at empowering women entrepreneurs in Sri Lanka through knowledge sharing and expert advice. It opens doors for Sri Lankan women-owned businesses to regional marketplaces while enabling women entrepreneurs of both India and Sri Lanka to network and collaborate on projects.
