= List of banks in Sri Lanka =

This is a list of banks in Sri Lanka.

== Central Bank ==
- Central Bank of Sri Lanka

== Licensed Commercial Banks ==
1. Amana Bank
2. Bank of Ceylon
3. Bank of China
4. Cargills Bank
5. Citibank
6. Commercial Bank of Ceylon
7. Deutsche Bank
8. DFCC Bank
9. Habib Bank
10. Hatton National Bank
11. Indian Bank
12. Indian Overseas Bank
13. MCB Bank
14. National Development Bank
15. Nations Trust Bank
16. Pan Asia Bank
17. People's Bank
18. Public Bank Berhad
19. Sampath Bank
20. Seylan Bank
21. Standard Chartered Bank
22. State Bank of India
23. Hong Kong and Shanghai Banking Corporation (HSBC)
24. Union Bank of Colombo

Source: Central Bank, March 2021

== Licensed Specialised Banks ==
1. Housing Development Finance Corporation Bank of Sri Lanka (HDFC)
2. National Savings Bank
3. Regional Development Bank (Pradheshiya Sanwardhana Bank)
4. Sanasa Development Bank
5. Sri Lanka Savings Bank
6. State Mortgage and Investment Bank

Source: Central Bank, September 2020

== Licensed Finance Companies ==
1. Abans Finance
2. Alliance Finance Company
3. AMW Capital Leasing and Finance
4. Asia Asset Finance
5. Assetline Finance
6. Associated Motor Finance Company (Note: Arpico Finance Co PLC has been amalgamated with Associated Motor Finance Co PLC with effect from 01 April 2021)
7. CBC Finance (previously known as Serendib Finance)
8. Central Finance Company
9. Citizens Development Business Finance
10. Commercial Credit and Finance (Note: Trade Finance and Investments PLC has been amalgamated with Commercial Credit & Finance PLC with effect from 31.12.2020)
11. Dialog Finance
12. ETI Finance (Note: The Monetary Board has decided to cause Director, Supervision of Non-Bank Financial Institutions to make an application to a competent court for the winding up of ETI Finance Limited, in terms of Section 31(5)(b) of the Finance Business Act, No. 42 of 2011.)
13. Fintrex Finance
14. HNB Finance
15. Lanka Credit and Business Finance
16. LB Finance
17. LOLC Finance
18. Mahindra Ideal Finance
19. Mercantile Investments and Finance
20. Merchant Bank of Sri Lanka and Finance
21. Multi Finance
22. Nation Lanka Finance
23. Orient Finance
24. People's Leasing & Finance
25. People's Merchant Finance
26. Richard Pieris Finance
27. Sarvodaya Development Finance
28. Senkadagala Finance
29. Singer Finance
30. Siyapatha Finance
31. SMB Finance
32. Softlogic Finance
33. U B Finance Company
34. Vallibel Finance

Source: Central Bank, 10 September 2023
