= Information and Communication Technology Agency of Sri Lanka =

Sri Lankan government agency

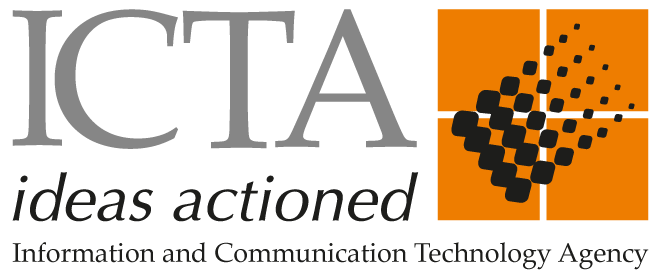
- ICTA Logo
- Type: Government owned Company
- Industry: ICT
- Founded: 2003; 23 years ago
- Headquarters: Colombo 03, Sri Lanka
- Key people: Prof. Malik Ranasinghe (Chairman)
- Revenue: ▲ Rs 1.544 billion (2018)
- Net income: ▲ Rs 906 million (2018)
- Total assets: ▲ Rs 9 billion (2018)
- Number of employees: 91 (2018)
- Parent: Ministry of Technology
- Website: www.icta.lk

The Information and Communication Technology Agency (ICTA; Sinhala: ශ්‍රී ලංකා තොරතුරු හා සන්නිවේදන තාක්‍ෂණ නියෝජිතායතනය, romanized: Shri Lanka Thorathuru Ha Sannivedana Thakshana Niyojithayathanaya; Tamil: இலங்கையின் தகவல் தொடர்பாடல் தொழில்நுட்ப முகவர் நிலையம், romanized: Ilaṅkaiyiṉ takaval toṭarpāṭal toḻilnuṭpa mukavar nilaiyam) is the lead agency in Sri Lanka for implementation of information and communications technology (ICT) initiatives by the Government of Sri Lanka. It was established to develop the economy of Sri Lanka through ICT. To this end, it works to improve the country's technological capacity, such as building infrastructure, and the readiness of its people, through education and human resources. It is also active in developing regulations around the use of technology and disseminating information worldwide about Sri Lankan ICT. Its current Chairman is Prof. Malik Ranasinghe.

== Establishment ==
ICTA was established on 12 May 2003 under the Information and Communication Technology Act, No. 27 of 2003, and strengthened by the ICT Amendment Act No. 33 of 2008. ICTA is functioning under the Ministry of Technology. The main thrust of ICTA is to set ICT policy as well as guide and direct national ICT development activities.

== The e-Swabhimani Award ==
e-Swabhimani, the “Digital Social Impact Awards” was launched in November 2009 with the objective of recognizing creativity and the skills of local developers and thereby providing them with a platform to showcase their solutions nationally and internationally. eSwabhimani looks at novel applications that make a positive social impact on the lives of people. It is expected that National Recognition would spur a greater interest in leveraging ICT for the social and economic development of the Country and that it would contribute significantly towards a digital transformation.

The contest is conducted along the lines of the World Summit Award, a global initiative within the framework of the United Nations World Summit on the Information Society (WSIS), focusing on the UN Sustainable Development Goals (SDG) and is a stepping stone to other regional and international awards.

== Disrupt Asia ==
Disrupt Asia
- Genre: Startup, Innovation
- Frequency: Annual
- Location: Colombo
- Country: Sri Lanka
- Inaugurated: 2016
- Founders: ICT Agency of Sri Lanka
- Website: Official website

Disrupt Asia is conference and festival in Sri Lanka dedicated to startups and innovation. It is organized by the ICTA. The innovation festival features a startup showcase, a knowledge hub, partner offerings, and art installations. It is a competition where shortlisted startups can pitch and win prizes. A panel consisting of local and foreign experts is there as judges.

== See also ==
- Information Technology in Sri Lanka
- Fusion – Sarvodaya ICT4D Movement
- GovPay
- Spiralation: ICTA Support Initiative for Tech Start-ups
