= Ceylinco Consolidated =

- Type: Private limited company
- Industry: Finance
- Founded: 1938; 88 years ago
- Founders: Justin Kotelawala; Cyril E. S. Perera; Cyril Rodrigo; Hugh Weerasekere
- Defunct: 2008; 18 years ago
- Headquarters: Colombo, Sri Lanka
- Key people: Deshamanya Lalith Kotelawala (Group Chairman); Titus Rodrigo (CEO)
- Products: Banking, Insurance, Non- Banking Finance, Investment Banking, Housing & Property Development, Travel & Leisure, Communication & Information Technology, Education and Healthcare
- Net income: ▲US$ 10 million (2006–8)
- Total assets: ▼US$ 200,000 billion (2006–8)
- Owner: Lalith Kotelawala
- Number of employees: more than 30,000 people
- Subsidiaries: Seylan Bank (1987-2008) Ceylinco Life (1939-2008) Ceylinco Insurance (1987-2008)
- Website: www.ceylincoconsolidated.com

Ceylinco Consolidated was a Sri Lanka business conglomerate until 2008.

== History ==
The original company, Ceylon Insurance Company, was founded by Hugh Weerasekera and Chevalier C. S. Antony with board members Justin Kotelawala, Cyril Rodrigo, and Cyril E. S. Perera (UNP member for Colombo North). It was the first Ceylonese company to be registered under the Companies Ordinance of 1938. The company commenced business on 3 April 1939, providing life and general insurance services. The Company was first located in the C.S. Anthony Building at 22 Baillie Street, in Colombo fort and later moved to No.69 Queens’ Street (Janadhipathi Mawatha), where the “Ceylinco House” was constructed.

The first directors of the company consisted of persons from the business world, medical profession and legal profession. They were:- Dr. S. C. Paul; Rosslyn Koch, C. S. Anthony, L. B. de Mel; Dr P. Kulasinghe; and Cyril E. S. Perera.

Due to the Perera's political stance against the SLFP's divisive "Sinhala Only Act" the Ceylon Insurance Co. was eventually politically persuaded to relinquish control by the then SLFP government of Mrs Bandaranayake to Senator Justin Kotelawala then on the board of Ceylon Insurance. Justin Kotelawala gained control of Ceylon Insurance Co. from Alice Farmacia Perera, the widow of Cyril E. S. Perera, and from Violet van Dort, the widow of Hugh Weerasekere. Many people at the time were under the impression Ceylon Insurance Co. was not a profitable company due to what people were led to believe, when, in fact, Ceylon Insurance Co. was and still is a significant player in Sri Lanka's economy. Cyril E. S. Perera also co-founded (with the Berenger family) another significant Sri Lankan company, Ceylon Chocolates Limited, known for its Kandos brand, which was named after Kandy where they first produced chocolate bars, in combination with the Latin word for money "dos". Kandos also went under the same SLFP reformation, with control eventually being transferred into the hands of Upali Wijewardene for no monetary value.

Justin Kotelawala and his son Lalith built the renamed Ceylinco into a major company which includes over 500 subsidiary companies. It has more than 450 offices with over 30,000 employees. In 1987 the company’s name was changed to Ceylinco Ltd. when it was registered as a public company. Ceylinco commenced business on 14 January 1988. A few of the many companies incorporated with Ceylinco are listed below.

=== 2009 ===
Ceylinco Consolidated is liable to repay nearly USD 200million for disgruntled depositors of failed Golden Key Credit Card Company, F&G (Finance and Guarantee) PLC, Ceylinco Shiram PLC The scandal, which erupted like a tsunami when the Ceylinco Golden Key Credit Card Company failed to honour its payments to depositors, soon spread to other institutions. it is estimated as at 2009 a sum exceeding Rs. 26.5 billion approx (USD200 million) had to be paid to the 9,054 depositors.

=== 2011 ===
A failed Ceylinco group company, Ceylinco Shiram repaid a sum of With the release of the third tranche of payments by Ceylinco Shriram, nearly 70% of its investors would receive over 50% of their deposits in cash and in August 2011 Ceylico Shiram re paid the rest of the deposits in keeping with the promise made to the depositors that 60% of the deposit money would be settled within 42 months in 2009.
