= Union Bank of Colombo =

Sri Lankan commercial bank

Union Bank of Colombo PLC
- Native name: යුනියන් බැංකුව யூனியன் வங்கி
- Type: Public
- Traded as: CSE: UBC.N0000
- ISIN: LK0306N00007
- Industry: Banking; Financial services
- Founded: 2 February 1995; 31 years ago
- Headquarters: Colombo, Sri Lanka
- Area served: Sri Lanka
- Key people: Dinesh Weerakkody (Chairman); Dilshan Rodrigo (Chief Executive Officer)
- Services: Retail banking; Corporate banking; SME banking
- Revenue: ▲LKR21.092 billion (2022)
- Operating income: ▲LKR8.845 billion (2022)
- Net income: ▼LKR422 million (2022)
- Total assets: ▲LKR136.679 billion (2022)
- Total equity: ▲LKR19.016 billion (2022)
- Owner: Culture Financial Holdings Ltd (70.84%); Vista Knowledge Pte Ltd (5.97%); Associated Electrical Corporation Ltd (2.70%)
- Number of employees: 1,164 (2022)
- Parent: Culture Financial Holdings Ltd
- Subsidiaries: National Asset Management Limited; UB Finance Company Limited
- Website: www.unionb.com

Union Bank of Colombo PLC (Sinhala: යුනියන් බැංකුව, romanized: Yuniyan bæṁkuva; Tamil: யூனியன் பாங்க் ஒவ் கொழும்பு பிஎல்சி, romanized: Yūṉiyaṉ pāṅk ov koḻumpu pi'elci), commonly referred to as UBC, is a commercial bank in Sri Lanka. It is licensed by the Central Bank of Sri Lanka, the central bank and national banking regulator.

== Overview ==
Union Bank of Colombo PLC is one of the top five banks in Sri Lanka in market capitalization as well as one of the country's fastest growing Financial Services Groups. As of 31 October 2017, the bank operated 66 branches and 121 automatic teller machines (ATM) across the island nation. The bank offers a range of products and services to Retail, SME and Corporate segments.

== History ==
UBC was established in 1995 as the eighth indigenous commercial bank with DFCC Bank, The Great Eastern Life Assurance Company Limited as its founding shareholders. The bank's shares were listed on the Colombo Stock Exchange in March 2016 after an initial public offering that was oversubscribed by 350 percent. The IPO was to enable the Bank to comply with the Central Bank Capital Adequacy norms.

In 2014 TPG Group, a USA based private investment firm with over US$70 billion of assets, acquired 70 percent of the issued share capital of UBC through its subsidiary, Culture Financial Holdings. The deal was valued at US$117 million, and was at the time one of the largest foreign direct investments in Sri Lanka's financial sector.

== Subsidiaries ==
Other than its banking business, Union Bank of Colombo provides additional financial services through its two subsidiaries:

- National Asset Management Limited (51% shareholding), an asset management company in Sri Lanka offering unit trusts and private portfolios for institutional investors and individual clients.
- UB Finance Company Limited (66.17% shareholding), a finance company offering financial services such as accepting deposits, maintaining savings accounts, lease financing, hire purchase, vehicle loans, mortgage loans, pawning, factoring, working capital financing and real estate.

== Ownership ==
The stock of Union Bank of Colombo PLC is listed on the Colombo Stock Exchange under the ticker symbol "UBC". As of December 2015, the largest shareholders in the bank's stock were:

Union Bank of Colombo PLC Stock Ownership
Rank	Name of Owner	Percentage Ownership
1	Culture Financial Holdings	70.00
2	Vista Knowledge Pte Limited	5.93
3	Others	24.07
	Total	100.00

== Governance ==
As of 2 October 2024, a nine-member board of directors governs the UBC, chaired by Dinesh Weerakkody and with Dilshan Rodrigo as chief executive officer.

== See also ==
- List of banks in Sri Lanka
- Central Bank of Sri Lanka
