= Kethesh Loganathan =

Ketheeshwaran Loganathan (Tamil: கேதீஶ்வரன் லோகநாதன்; 1952–12 August 2006) was a Sri Lankan Tamil political and human rights activist and deputy secretary general of the Secretariat for Coordinating the Peace Process (SCOPP). He was among the fiercest critics of the separatist Liberation Tigers of Tamil Eelam (LTTE), which was widely blamed for his death. The group has neither accepted nor denied responsibility for his assassination.

== Upbringing ==
Loganathan was born in Colombo, although the Loganathan family originally came from Puloly-Vadamarachchi in Jaffna. His father, Chelliah Loganathan, was a former General Manager and Chief Executive of the Bank of Ceylon. Kethesh studied at St. Thomas’s College Mt. Lavinia and Loyola College, Madras. Ketheesh Loganathan received a Bachelor's degree in Business Administration from Georgetown University in Washington DC and a Master's in Development Studies from the Institute of Social Studies in the Hague in the Netherlands. He also worked on a Master's degree at the Institute of Development Studies, University of Sussex, UK. In 1998 he was awarded the Hubert Humphrey Fellowship and was enrolled for a year at the college of Journalism, University of Maryland, USA.

== Political career ==
After completing his education, Loganathan returned to Sri Lanka and worked as a social science researcher and with the Marga Institute in Jaffna. With the outbreak of the Sri Lankan civil war in 1983, he joined the EPRLF, a militant Tamil group that eventually came to rival the LTTE. Loganathan's role was essentially academic and political, rather than military, and he left the group in 1994. He continued to work as an author and journalist. Along with his good friend Paikiasothy Saravanamuttu, he helped to form an independent think tank, named the Center for Policy Alternatives, and served on its board of directors until 2006. In 1996 he published his book 'Lost Opportunities' which highlights the political context in which attempts were made to address/resolve the ethnic conflict in Sri Lanka and how they failed.

== Human Rights advocacy ==
Loganathan was increasingly critical of the LTTE on human rights grounds. He particularly criticized the rebels for their use of child soldiers and intolerance of political dissent. In March 2006, President Mahinda Rajapaksa offered Loganathan the post of deputy secretary general of the government's peace secretariat.

== Death ==
Loganathan was assassinated outside his home by a man who claimed to be a member of the Criminal Investigation Department.. Human rights organizations such as Human Rights Watch, UTHR and other Sri Lanka observers have held the LTTE responsible for this murder.

=== Motive ===
The website Nitharsanam.com, which is connected to the LTTE, accused Ketheesh of being a traitor. Tamilnet and Nitharsanam announced his death before it was confirmed by the Kalubowila Hospital, where he was admitted after being shot. Soon after his death, many commentators on the Sri Lankan civil war, such as David Jeyaraj, Dayan Jayatillake and Rajan Hoole, concluded that Loganathan was killed by the LTTE. However, this is denied by Nitharsanam.com.

== See also ==
- State terrorism in Sri Lanka
- Sri Lankan civil war
- Notable assassinations of the Sri Lankan Civil War
