= Ravi Abeysuriya =

Sri Lankan financial analyst (died 2023)

- Died: 25 October 2023
- Education: Fellow of the Chartered Institute of Management Accountants; Monash University
- Occupation: Managing Director Non-Executive Director
- Known for: First Chartered Financial Analyst of Sri Lanka

Darshan Ravindra Abeysuriya also popularly known as Ravi Abeysuriya was a Sri Lankan accountant, educator and financial analyst. He was regarded as one of the topmost finance sector professionals in Sri Lanka. He was also considered as officially the first Chartered Financial Analyst charter holder in Sri Lanka. He also served as the President of the Colombo Stock Brokers Association for a brief stint.

== Career ==
During his career, he had established and managed various financial sector institutions catering to prominent fields such as investment research outsourcing, credit rating, asset management, stock broking and investment banking. He obtained the fellow membership of the Chartered Institute of Management Accountants in UK. He also received his MBA from Monash University in Melbourne, Australia. He played an instrumental role in founding the Chartered Financial Analyst (CFA) community in Sri Lanka and was popularly known as the CFA Society and Ravi Abeysuriya eventually acted as its first founding President.

He served as chairman of Colombo City Holdings PLC, Sherwood Capital (Pvt) Ltd. He also served as non-executive independent director of Seylan Bank PLC, Bio Foods (Pvt) Ltd, Candor Shared Services Ltd, Candor Equities Ltd and HNB Assurance PLC. He also showed his glimpse of leadership prowess at Hayleys PLC as the Head of Strategic Business Development and Shared Services unit of the Hayleys PLC. He also went on to serve as the managing director of Fitch Ratings Lanka which was the first global credit rating agency to operate in Sri Lanka. Ravi was the founding member of Fitch Ratings Lanka and during his tenure as the managing director of Fitch Ratings Lanka, he established a robust credit rating system in Sri Lanka. He also had a stint as the Head of Corporate Finance at Jardine Fleming HNB Capital Ltd between 1997 and 1999. He also served as managing director of Amba Research Lanka which was a prominent investment research outsourcing company. He also served as the President of Stock Brokers Association of Sri Lanka and he also had advised the Government of Sri Lanka to encourage the listing of State owned enterprises in Colombo Stock Exchange in order to foster better performance levels. In addition, he also had a brief stint as the director of Sri Lanka Insurance.

He possessed nearly two decades of hands-on practical experience and broad knowledge about financial market operations in Sri Lanka and experience with related fundamental concepts of financial market operations. He also served as a financial expert by giving policy recommendations for implementation of major financial sector reforms. He also collaborated with important regulatory bodies in Sri Lanka including the Central Bank of Sri Lanka, Securities and Exchange Commission of Sri Lanka and the Colombo Stock Exchange. He was appointed the commission member of the Securities and Exchange Commission of Sri Lanka in 2007 where he was engaged in capital market supervision as well as training the staff. He also worked closely with the Ministry of Finance in providing technical support in addressing the key concerns with regards to fiscal policy measures in Sri Lanka. He also functioned as a permanent member of the Financial Sector Reforms Committee which operated as a special prime minister task force for a considerable period of time. He also received membership of the Ceylon Chamber of Commerce.

He also co-authored a book alongside the Central Bank of Sri Lanka titled Financial Literacy to Achieve Your Financial Wellbeing with the intention to raise financial literacy and awareness among general public in Sri Lanka. In May 2017, he was conferred with the inaugural Lifetime Achievement Volunteer of the Year Award from the CFA Institute and he was presented the award during a ceremony held at Society Leadership Conference held in Philadelphia, Pennsylvania. In October 2018, he was appointed an independent director at Seylan Bank.

== Death ==
He died on 25 October 2023 after being diagnosed with a sudden illness.
