= ETI Finance =

Sri Lankan finance company

- Company type: Public
- Industry: Finance
- Founded: 1967; 59 years ago
- Defunct: 2019
- Headquarters: Colombo 07
- Key people: E. A. P. Edirisinghe; Soma Edirisinghe& her children as directors

Edirisinghe Trust Investments Finance Limited also popularly known as ETI Finance is a Sri Lankan private limited company as well as a non banking financial institution which worked as a licensed finance company accepting deposits from general public. The company's business was primarily based on lending money on gold securities. On 13 July 2020, Central Bank of Sri Lanka decided to cancel the license of the company due to insufficient capital and financial problems regarding repaying depositors' money on demand as well as before maturity.

== Corporate history ==
The company was founded by veteran entrepreneur E. A. P. Edirisinghe in 1967 initially as a pawning business registered under the Finance Companies Act no 78 of 1988. The company later expanded its business activities such as accepting deposits, leasing etc. ETI Finance is a core company of popular family controlled entity EAP Holdings. The company was regarded as a leading financial institution in Sri Lanka for decades and the reputation of the business started to make downfall soon after the death of E. A. P. Edirisinghe. Soma Edirisinghe, wife of EAP Edirisinghe took over the company and remained as the chairperson of the company until her death in 2015.

ETI Finance failed to maintain required liquidity position since 2011. The company was accused of not honouring the depositors request of money withdrawals since 2011. The company was issued its first official warning in February 2013 by the Fitch Ratings Lanka for not maintaining the required Statutory Liquid Asset Ratio threshold and downgraded the company's position from BB (lka) to CC (lka).

In 2018, the CBSL warned of temporary regulatory actions against the company under the provisions of Finance Business Act no 42 of 2011 for failing to maintain adequate liquidity position and for failing to pay depositors money and CBSL vehemently took over the ETI Finance with immediate effect. As of 2020, the company defaulted the sum of 20 billion rupees of around 2500 depositors.

In June 2020, the Colombo Magistrate Court issued arrest warrants against the directors of the company with regard to failing to appear on a due court case.

On 13 July 2020, the Central Bank of Sri Lanka officially suspended the licenses of ETI Finance and its subsidiary company Swarnamahal Financial Services following the decision reached during a meeting held by the Monetary Board of CBSL on 10 July 2020.

== See also ==
- List of banks in Sri Lanka
