= People's Bank =

People's Bank or Popular Bank may refer to a number of banks or bank buildings:

== Austria and Germany ==
- Volksbank Group of co-operative banks in Austria
- Volksbanken, member banks of the German Cooperative Financial Group

== Canada ==
- Bank of the People, a defunct bank in Upper Canada (now Ontario, Canada)
- La Banque du Peuple, a defunct bank in Lower Canada (now Quebec, Canada)
- Peoples Group, a financial services firm consisting of a trust company and direct bank

== China ==
- People's Bank of China, the central bank of the People's Republic of China

== Congo / Zaire ==
- Banque du Peuple, brand under which the Société Congolaise de Banque was operated between 1970 and its rebranding as Banque Zaïroise du Commerce Extérieur

== Cyprus ==
- Cyprus Popular Bank

== France ==
- Groupe Banque Populaire

== Georgia ==
- People's Bank of Georgia, headquartered in Tbilisi, Georgia

== Greece ==
- Popular Bank (Greece)

== Italy ==
- Banca Popolare (disambiguation), several institutions

== Morocco ==
- Banque Populaire

== Russia ==
- People's Bank (Russia)
- Moscow Narodny Bank

== Slovenia ==
- People's Savings Bank (Celje)

== Spain ==
- Banco Popular Español

== Sri Lanka ==
- People's Bank (Sri Lanka), a state-owned commercial bank

== Tanzania ==
- People's Bank of Zanzibar, a commercial bank

== United States ==
- Banco Popular de Puerto Rico
- People's United Financial (formerly People's Bank), headquartered in Bridgeport, Connecticut
- People's State Bank (Orangeville, Illinois), listed on the National Register of Historic Places (NRHP) in Illinois
- Peoples National Bank (Pella, Iowa) , listed on the NRHP in Marion County, Iowa
- PeoplesBank, a community bank in Western Massachusetts
- Peoples Federal Savings Bank, headquartered in Brighton, Massachusetts; see Rockland Trust § 2001-2018
- People's Bank and Trust Company Building, listed on the NRHP in New Jersey
- People's Bank of Buffalo, New York
- People's Bank and Trust, Rocky Mount, North Carolina, merged into Centura Bank
- Peoples Bank, a community bank in Marietta, Ohio
- People's National Bank Building (Rock Hill, South Carolina), listed on the NRHP in South Carolina
- People's National Bank Building (Tyler, Texas), listed on the NRHP in Texas
- People's Bank of Eggleston, listed on the NRHP in Virginia
- People's Bank (Weirton, West Virginia), listed on the NRHP in West Virginia
