= People's Leasing & Finance =

Sri Lankan non-banking financial company

People's Leasing & Finance PLC
- Logo of People's Leasing
- Company type: Public
- Traded as: CSE: PLC.N0000
- ISIN: LK0399N00002
- Industry: Financial services
- Founded: August 22, 1995; 30 years ago
- Headquarters: Colombo, Sri Lanka
- Number of locations: 111 (2023)
- Key people: Michael Pradeep Amirthanayagam (Chairman); Sanjeewa Bandaranayake (Chief Executive Officer/General Manager)
- Revenue: ▲LKR39.163 billion (2023)
- Operating income: ▼LKR19.892 billion (2023)
- Net income: ▼LKR3.442 million (2023)
- Total assets: ▼LKR194.377 billion (2023)
- Total equity: ▲LKR47.004 billion (2023)
- Owners: People's Bank (75.00%); Employees' Provident Fund (5.43%); National Savings Bank (2.76%)
- Number of employees: ▼2,114 (2023)
- Parent: Peoples' Bank
- Subsidiaries: People's Insurance PLC; People's Micro-Commerce Ltd; People's Leasing Fleet Management Ltd; People's Leasing Property Development Ltd; People's Leasing Havelock Properties Ltd; Lankan Alliance Finance Ltd
- Website: www.plc.lk

People's Leasing & Finance PLC, sometimes called People's Leasing Company or commonly abbreviated PLC, is a licensed non-banking financial company in Sri Lanka. The company is ranked 30th in LMD 100, an annual list of leading listed companies in Sri Lanka. Brand Finance placed the company 21st amongst the 100 most valuable brands in Sri Lanka. The company was incorporated in 1995 and in 2010 listed on the Colombo Stock Exchange. 75% of the shares of the company is held by the People's Bank, one of the two government-held banks of Sri Lanka.

== History ==
The company was incorporated in 1995 as a limited liability company. During 2008/09 the company diversified into new business areas by forming two subsidiaries. People's Insurance Ltd was incorporated as a wholly owned subsidiary in 2009/10. The company was listed on the Colombo Stock Exchange in 2010. The company merged with its subsidiary People's Finance PLC in 2013/14. The company appointed a new CEO, Shamindra Marcelline in November 2020.

== Operations ==
Fitch Ratings affirmed the A+ credit rating for People's Leasing in September 2021 and the outlook is adjudged as stable in September 2021. With a market share of 12% of the Finance and Leasing Company sector, the company is one of the largest finance and leasing companies in the country. People's Leasing ranked 27th in Business Today's Top 40 for the year 2020/21. The company recorded the highest profit in the history of the company for the year 2020/21. In 2021, the company issued LKR10 billion debentures and received applications for over LKR14 billion by the closure. At the 56th Charted Accountants Awards, organised by the Institute of Chartered Accountants of Sri Lanka, the company received the silver award for the annual report 2020/21 in finance and leasing companies sector. The company relocated its metropolitan branch to Vauxall Street in Slave Island, Colombo after renovation in December 2021. The premises was inaugurated by the company's chairman, Sujeewa Rajapakse.

== See also ==
- List of companies listed on the Colombo Stock Exchange
- List of Sri Lankan public corporations by market capitalisation
