= Lalith Kotelawala =

Sri Lankan businessman (1938–2023)

- Born: Jeewaka Lalith Bhupendra Kotelawala; 29 October 1938; Colombo, British Ceylon
- Died: 21 October 2023 (aged 84); Colombo, Sri Lanka
- Other name: Lalith Kotelawala
- Education: Royal College Colombo
- Title: Deshamanya
- Spouse: Sicille Kotelawala
- Parent(s): Justin Kotelawala, Millicent Kotelawala
- Relatives: John Kotelawala; Sam Peter Christopher Fernando

Deshmanya Jeewaka Lalith Bhupendra Kotelawala (29 October 1938 – 21 October 2023) was a Sri Lankan businessman, who was the chairman of Ceylinco Consolidated and also was the founding chairman of Seylan Bank. He was listed in the 2007 Sri Lanka Richest List. He was remanded for the misappropriation of 26 billion rupees of investments from the failed Golden Key Credit Card Company .

== Early life and education ==
Lalith Kotelawala was born to Senator Justin Kotelawala, a Ceylonese politician and businessman, and Millicent Kotelawala nee de Silva, daughter of Sir Arthur Marcelles de Silva, a leading surgeon. He was educated at Royal College, Colombo and studied chartered accountancy in the UK. He was the nephew of Sir John Kotelawala, the third prime minister of Ceylon.

== Career ==
Taking over Ceylinco Consolidated from his father in the 1960s, Kotelawala expanded the group into new fields including banking, non-banking finance, investment banking, housing and property development, travel and leisure, communication and information technology, education and healthcare and microfinance. He also founded a peace initiative in Sri Lanka, three years after being wounded in a Liberation Tigers of Tamil Eelam attack in 1996.

== Personal life and death ==
Lalith was married to Sicille Kotelawala (née Fernando), the daughter of Sam Peter Christopher Fernando.

Lalith Kotelawala died in Colombo on 21 October 2023, at the age of 84.

== Awards and honours ==
- Kotelawala was awarded an honorary Doctor of Philosophy degree by the University of Sri Jayewardenepura
- The title Deshmanya by the Government of Sri Lanka in 1994
- The title Deshabandu by the Government of Sri Lanka in 1991
- Fellow of the Chartered Management Institute
- Honorary fellow of the Institute of Bankers
