= NDB Bank =

Sri Lankan commercial bank

National Development Bank PLC
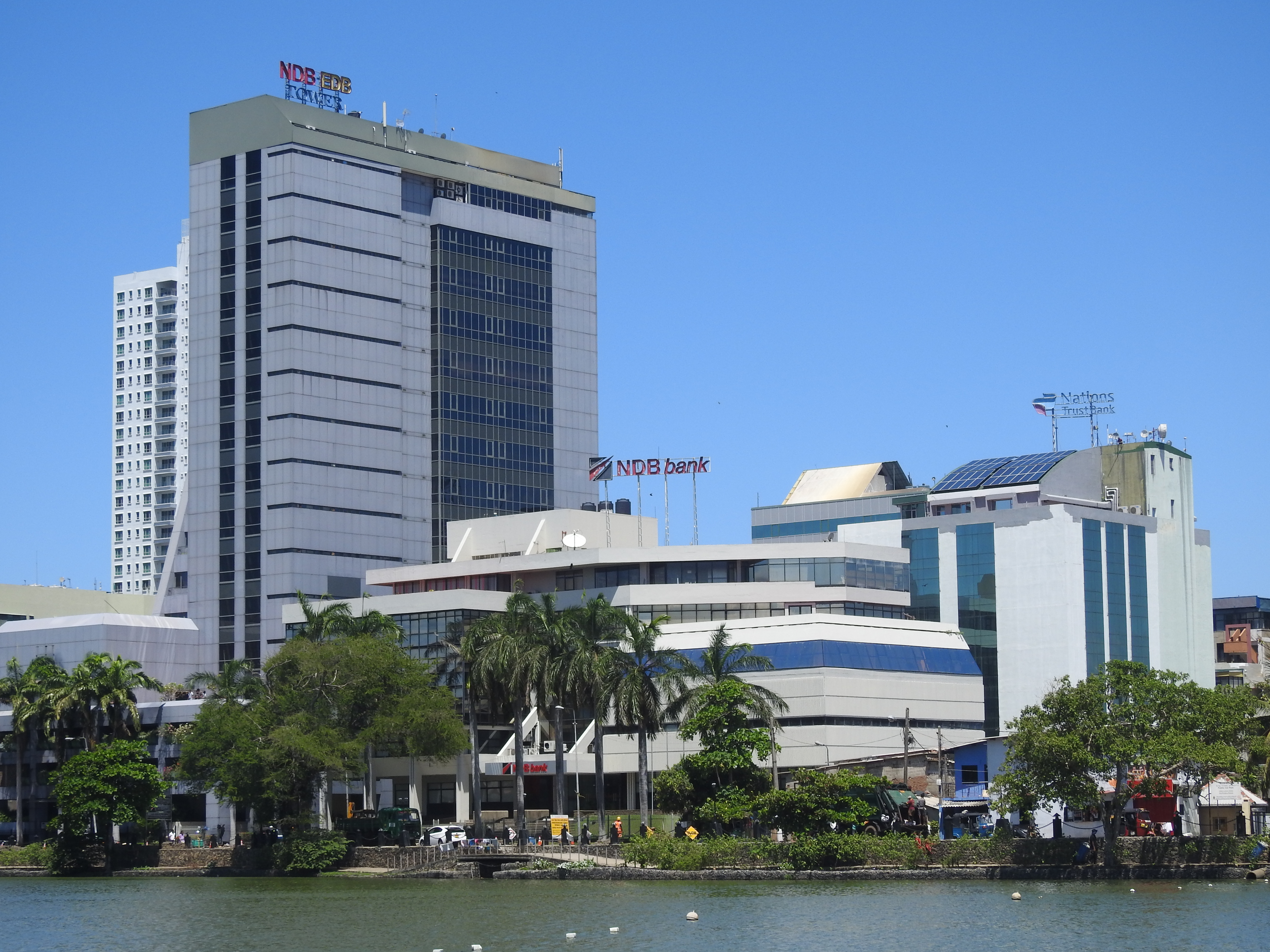
- NDB Head Office in Colombo as seen across Beira Lake
- Company type: Public
- Traded as: CSE: NDB.N0000
- ISIN: LK0207N00007
- Industry: Financial services
- Founded: 1979; 47 years ago
- Headquarters: Colombo, Sri Lanka
- Number of locations: 113 branches (82 ATMs)
- Key people: Sriyan Cooray (Chairman); Kelum Edirisinghe (CEO)
- Revenue: ▲LKR134.473 billion (2023)
- Operating income: ▲LKR25.987 billion (2023)
- Net income: ▲LKR5.858 billion (2023)
- Total assets: ▲LKR786.959 billion (2023)
- Total equity: ▲LKR74.471 billion (2023)
- Owners: Standard Chartered Bank Mauritius S/A Norfund (9.99%); Employees' Provident Fund (9.50%); Bank of Ceylon No. 1 Account (7.95%)
- Number of employees: ▼2,756 (2023)
- Website: www.ndbbank.com

The National Development Bank PLC (commonly referred to as NDB Bank) is a Sri Lankan banking and financial services institution, headquartered in Colombo, Sri Lanka. Having begun operations as a state-owned development finance institution in 1979. In January 1979, the predecessor of National Development Bank PLC (“NDB” or “Bank”) was set up by the National Development Bank of Sri Lanka Act No 2 of 1979 as “National Development Bank of Sri Lanka”, as a wholly state-owned institution. Following a change of ownership structure in 1993, NDB was privatized and listed on the Colombo Stock Exchange.

As a part of its long-term plans in 2001, NDB incorporated a commercial bank under the Companies Act No. 2 of 1982 under the name “NDB Bank Limited” (“NBL”) to take over the business and operations of ABN Amro NV Colombo Branch ("ABN Amro"). On 29 July 2005, NDB acquired the business and operations of NBL (NDB Bank Limited) and converted from a Licensed Specialed Bank to a Licensed Commercial Bank.

== Controversy ==
On 2 April 2026, the bank announced that an employee-linked fraud had been detected, amounting to Rs. 380 million (approximately US$1.21 million). On 6 April, this figure was revised to Rs. 13.2 billion (approximately US$41.93 million) in a disclosure to the Colombo Stock Exchange.

== Awards ==
The bank won the 2021 Best Retail Bank Sri Lanka award. NDB Bank has been recognised as the “Most Awarded Corporate 2021” as per 'Most Awarded' ranking by the LMD magazine.

== See also ==
- List of national development banks
