= C. Loganathan =

Ceylon Tamil banker and general manager of the Bank of Ceylon

- Born: 19 September 1913
- Died: 4 May 1981 (aged 67)
- Education: Victoria College, Chulipuram; Hartley College
- Occupation: Banker
- Title: General Manager of the Bank of Ceylon
- Term: 1953 – 1969
- Predecessor: A. T. Hunter
- Successor: Sydney Sirimanne

Chelliah Loganathan (19 September 1913 – 4 May 1981) was a Ceylon Tamil banker and the first Ceylonese general manager of the Bank of Ceylon.

== Early life and family ==
Loganathan was born on 19 September 1913. He was the son of V. Chelliah and Pilawadi Thangamuthu Ammai from Puloly South near Point Pedro in northern Ceylon. He was educated at Victoria College, Chulipuram and Hartley College. He received higher education in Colombo and Bombay.

Loganathan married Thilagavathy Ammai, daughter of C. Sivasithamparam. They had three sons (Sathananthan, Sritharan and Kethesh) and three daughters (Gowri, Vasuki and Lalitha). His son in Law A.Tharmaratnam served with the International Financial Corporation of the World Bank. His granddaughter (daughter of Gowri Tharmaratnam) Mythili Raman is the acting United States Assistant Attorney General for the Criminal Division.

== Career ==
Loganathan started working for the Bank of Ceylon in 1939. After a series of promotions he became general manager of the bank in 1953. He remained in this post until 1969 during which time the bank grew rapidly.

Loganathan was a director of the Development Finance Corporation of Ceylon for two years, an adviser to the Development Bank of Philippines and a consultant to the UN Asian Institute for Economic Development and Planning.

== Later life ==
Loganathan helped build and restore Hindu temples in his later years. He died on 4 May 1981.
