= Seylan Bank =

Sri Lankan commercial bank

Seylan Bank PLC
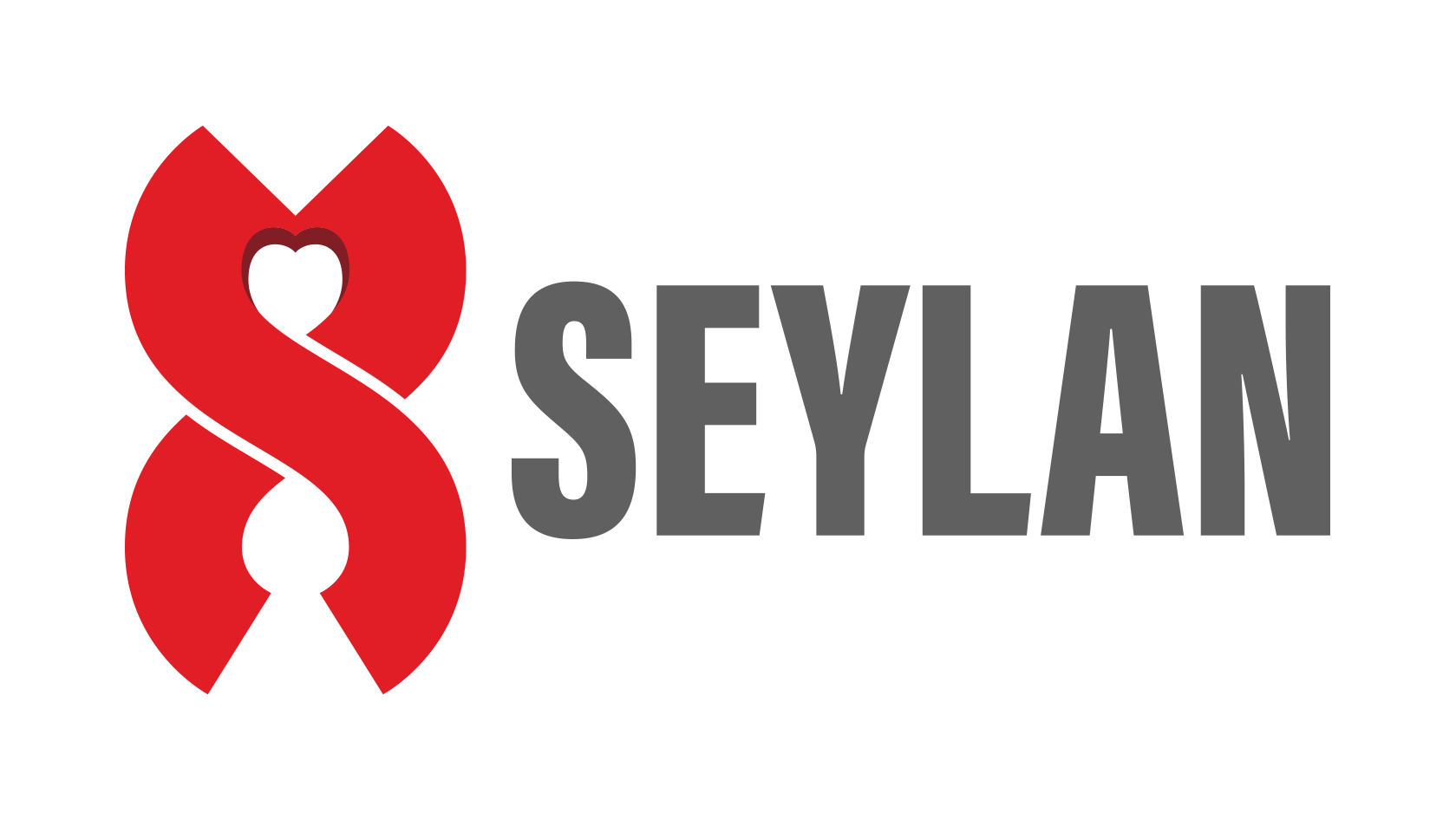
- Seylan Bank logo
- Type: Public
- Traded as: CSE: SEYB.N0000
- ISIN: LK0182N00002
- Industry: Finance
- Founded: August 1987, 28; 38 years ago
- Founder: Lalith Kotelawala
- Headquarters: Colombo, Sri Lanka
- Number of locations: 169 (2025)
- Key people: Justice Buwaneka Aluwihare (Chairman); Mr.Ramesh Jayasekara (CEO)
- Products: Banking; Financial services; Related services
- Revenue: ▲LKRLKR 48.78 billion (2024 1H)
- Operating income: ▲LKR 23.28 billion (2024 1H)
- Net income: ▲LKR 4.56 billion (2024 1H)
- Total assets: ▲LKR 725.22 billion (2024 1H)
- Total equity: ▲LKR 64.44 billion (2024 1H)
- Owners: LOLC Holdings PLC (51.60%); Employees' Provident Fund (5.33%); Sri Lanka Insurance Corporation Life Fund (3.35%)
- Number of employees: 3173 (as at 1st August) (2024)
- Subsidiaries: Seylan Developments PLC (70.51%)
- Website: www.seylan.lk

Seylan Bank PLC (Sinhala: සෙලාන් බැංකුව, romanized: Selan Bænkuwa) is a publicly owned Commercial Bank in Sri Lanka. It has branches in both urban and rural areas of Sri Lanka. Seylan bank had 170 banking centres island-wide, 3173 staff members (as at 1st August 2024), an ATM network of 182 units covering crucial locations, 11 branches providing 365-day banking in 2020. The bank was formed as a licensed commercial bank incorporated with a shareholder base.

== History ==
Seylan Bank was incorporated on 28 August 1987 as a Public Limited Liability Company and the founder chairman was Dr. Lalith Kotelawala. It established its first subsidiary, Seylan Merchant Bank Limited, in 1992. A second subsidiary, Ceylinco Seylan Development Limited was also established in 1992, primarily for the purpose of constructing the Bank's head office building, Ceylinco Seylan Towers.

Seylan Bank introduced Sri Lanka's first homegrown credit card and they also had a partnership deal with Western Union.

=== Crisis ===
Seylan Bank's troubles started when the Golden Key Credit Card Company, an unregulated firm of the Ceylinco group was unable to repay its customers due to financial instability.

The collapse of the Golden Key Credit Card Company which was a subsidiary of the Ceylinco Consolidated and the mismanagement of funds by the former chairman in 2008, resulted in a liquidity crisis in the last weeks of 2008. This prompted the monetary board of the Central Bank of Sri Lanka to bring Seylan Bank under the control of state-owned Bank of Ceylon (BOC) on 28 December 2008. This took place under Section 30(1) of the Monetary Law Act No.58 of 1 949.

=== Bounce back ===
An 11-member team was appointed by the Bank of Ceylon on the behalf of Central Bank of Sri Lanka's request in 2008 following the downfall of the bank and due to the unethical behaviour and activities of Golden Key Credit Card Company which was affiliated with Seylan Bank.

The team managed to re-establish the financial stability of the bank and introduced effective risk management policies. Recreation of a comprehensive strategic business plan, development of employees, and reducing operational expenses were accomplished by the board of directors.

The bank earned a tax profit of Rs.188 million at the end of the year 2009. The bank was able to cover 300 million from previous non-performing loans.

Seylan Bank made a reputation once again as one of the leading banks in Sri Lanka after reaching a solution regarding the scam by the Golden Key Company and still continuing their services to people.

In May 2010, the bank's profits were up 32.3% when compared to the previous year.

== See also ==
- List of banks in Sri Lanka
