= Woman-friendly workplace =

Woman-friendly businesses are entities that specifically cater to female consumers or employees.

According to one group of academics, the most important government policies that create a woman-friendly workplace are paid maternity and parental leave that protect employers from dismissal, and public funding for child care. In contrast, another group of feminist theorists say that "[P]ublic bodies ... cannot force employers to organise their workplaces in a more woman friendly fashion nor does it place them under a duty to appraise the impact of their managerial policy... without the involvement of the private sector the ability of [laws] to achieve real change may be limited."

A woman-friendly workplace has been described as allowing one to "nurtur[e] a business while nurturing your family".

== See also ==
- Gender equality § Economic empowerment of women
- Women Friendly Workplace Awards
