= DFCC Bank =

Sri Lankan commercial bank

DFCC Bank PLC
- Type: Public
- Traded as: CSE: DFCC.N0000; S&P Sri Lanka 20 Index component
- ISIN: LK0055N00000
- Industry: Banking; financial services
- Founded: 1955; 71 years ago
- Headquarters: Colombo, Sri Lanka
- Key people: J. Durairatnam (Chairman); N. H. T. I. Perera (CEO)
- Revenue: ▲LKR73.520 billion (2022)
- Operating income: ▲LKR31.437 billion (2022)
- Net income: ▼LKR3.041 billion (2022)
- Total assets: ▲LKR569.522 billion (2022)
- Total equity: ▲LKR54.320 billion (2022)
- Owners: Hatton National Bank A/c No. 1 (12.47%); Bank of Ceylon No. 2 A/c (10.46%); LOLC Investment Holding Three (Pvt) Ltd (9.99%)
- Number of employees: ▼1,989 (2022)
- Subsidiaries: See text
- Website: www.dfcc.lk

DFCC Bank is a development finance institution that was set up in 1955 in Sri Lanka on the recommendation of the World Bank and is one of the oldest development banks in Asia.

In October 2015, DFCC Bank amalgamated with its 99% owned subsidiary, DFCC Vardhana Bank.

In May 2025, the bank received a $12m Swiss loan for green projects.

In 2026, DFCC Bank bought Standard Chartered's wealth and retail banking business.

== Subsidiary companies ==
- DFCC Consulting (Pvt) Limited
- Lanka Industrial Estates Limited
- Synapsys Limited
- National Asset Management Limited

== See also ==
- List of banks in Sri Lanka
