= Amana Bank (Sri Lanka) =

Sri Lankan commercial bank

Coordinates: 06°54′15″N 79°51′07″E

Amana Bank PLC
- Company type: Public
- Traded as: CSE: ABL.N0000
- ISIN: LK0424N00008
- Industry: Financial services
- Founded: February 5, 2009; 16 years ago
- Headquarters: Colombo, Sri Lanka
- Number of locations: 33 branches (34 ATMs)
- Key people: Ali Asghar Akbarally (Chairman); Mohamed Azmeer (CEO)
- Revenue: ▼LKR 15.399 billion (2024)
- Operating income: ▲LKR 4.609 billion (2024)
- Net income: ▲LKR 1.774 billion (2024)
- Total assets: ▲LKR 182.336 billion (2024)
- Total equity: ▲LKR 22.841 billion (2024)
- Owner: IB Growth Fund (24.91%); Sampath Bank (11.05%); Cargills Bank (5.27%)
- Number of employees: ▲899 (2024)
- Website: www.amanabank.lk

Amãna Bank is the first and only licensed commercial bank in Sri Lanka to conduct all its operations under the principles of Islamic banking and be fully disengaged from interest based transactions, offering the full spectrum of retail banking, SME banking, corporate banking, treasury and trade finance services.

The bank has a network of 33 branches, 20 self banking centres and 5,400+ ATM access points. It offers online banking, online account opening, VISA debit card with SMS alerts, 365 day banking, Saturday banking, extended banking hours, 24x7 cash deposit machines and banking units exclusively for women.

Amãna Bank PLC is a stand-alone institution licensed by the Central Bank of Sri Lanka and listed on the Colombo Stock Exchange. Jeddah based IDB Group is the principal shareholder, with a 29.97% stake of thebBank. The IDB Group is a ‘AAA’ rated multilateral development financial institution with a capital base of over US$150 billion which has a membership of 57 countries.

The bank's head office is located at 486 Galle Road, Colombo, and it maintains branches at 33 locations around the country.

In April 2020, Fitch Ratings assigned Amana Bank PLC a rating of "BB+" with a Stable Outlook.

== See also ==
- List of banks in Sri Lanka
