= Uswetakeiyawa =

Coordinates: 7°03′N 79°52′E

Uswetakeiyawa (Sinhala: උස්වැටකෙයියාව) is a small fishing village in Wattala Pradeshiya Sabha, Gampaha District, Western Province, Sri Lanka.
