= GovPay =

Digital payment platform in Sri Lanka

- Release: 7 February 2025; 21 months ago
- Operating system: Web-based; Mobile apps
- Platform: Cross-platform
- Type: Digital payment platform
- License: Proprietary
- Website: govpay.lk

GovPay is a digital payment platform launched by the Government of Sri Lanka to streamline and modernise payment processes for government services. Officially introduced on 7 February 2025, under the patronage of President Anura Kumara Dissanayake, GovPay represents a significant step toward the digitalization of public services in Sri Lanka. This is a joint initiative of the Ministry of Digital Economy, Information and Communication Technology Agency (ICTA), LankaPay and the Central Bank of Sri Lanka, aims to enhance efficiency, transparency, and accessibility in citizen-government financial interactions. The platform serves as a centralised "Citizen's One Stop Shop" for online payments, catering to individuals and businesses.

== Background ==
Sri Lanka's transition to digital public infrastructure has been driven by the need to address inefficiencies in traditional cash-based transactions and handwritten receipt systems prevalent in government institutions. The 2023 budget proposal mandated the shift of all government payments and collections to electronic platforms, aligning with global trends toward digital governance. GovPay was developed to reduce fraud, improve revenue collection, and provide a secure and efficient payment channel. The platform integrates with fintech applications and online banking systems, enabling seamless transactions for citizens.

The initiative reflects Sri Lanka's broader digital transformation strategy, which includes projects like eBMD and the expansion of the President's Fund, launched concurrently with GovPay. The Ministry of Digital Economy has emphasised that cash-based transactions cost approximately 1.5% of the country's annual Gross Domestic Product (GDP), underscoring the economic rationale for digital payment adoption.

== Development and launch ==
GovPay was developed through a collaborative effort involving ICTA, LankaPay, the Ministry of Digital Economy, and the Central Bank of Sri Lanka. The platform's development was supported by two key regulatory circulars issued by the Central Bank in 2025:

- Payment and Settlement Systems Circular No. 01 of 2025: Imposes a maximum per-transaction fee for payments processed through GovPay to ensure affordability.
- Payment and Settlement Systems Circular No. 02 of 2025: Provides guidelines for the operational framework of digital payment systems.

The platform was officially launched on 7 February 2025, with an initial integration of 16 government institutions. An additional 30 institutions are planned to join in two subsequent phases, with full implementation targeted for April 2025. At launch, 12 state and private banks were integrated into the platform, enabling payments through mobile banking apps and internet banking.

A workshop organised by ICTA prior to the launch trained stakeholders on the platform's functionality, ensuring readiness among government institutions and financial partners. The phased rollout was designed to create a seamless, user-centric experience, with a focus on accessibility and cybersecurity.

== Features and functionality ==
GovPay serves as a centralised digital payment gateway for government services, allowing citizens to make payments via fintech applications, online banking platforms listed in the GovPay website (govpay.lk). Key features include:

- Centralised Payment System: Acts as a single platform for payments across multiple government institutions.
- Integration with Financial Institutions: Supports transactions through 14 state and private banks, with plans to expand further.
- Accessibility: Enables payments through mobile apps and online banking, reducing the need for physical visits to government offices or post offices.
- Security and Transparency: Designed to minimise fraud and enhance accountability in revenue collection.
- Phased Implementation: Initially covers 16 institutions, with plans to include 46 by April 2025.

One of the flagship applications of GovPay is the online payment of traffic fines, launched as a pilot project in April 2025 in collaboration with the Sri Lanka Police.

== Pilot projects and applications ==
=== Traffic fine payments ===
In April 2025, GovPay partnered with the Sri Lanka Police to launch a pilot project for the online payment of traffic fines. This initiative allows motorists to pay fines instantly via mobile banking apps or internet banking, often at the roadside, eliminating the need for post office visits or physical interactions with police stations. The system has been praised for its convenience and has been supported by awareness programs to promote adoption.

=== Expressway toll payments ===
Another pilot project introduced in 2025 allows expressway toll payments via credit card through GovPay, aiming to bring cash stored in informal economies into circulation. This initiative supports Sri Lanka's efforts to formalise financial transactions and enhance economic transparency.

== Impact and reception ==
GovPay has been recognised as a transformative step in Sri Lanka's digital governance journey, aligning with global trends toward digital public infrastructure. By reducing reliance on cash transactions, the platform addresses inefficiencies and enhances transparency in revenue collection.

The initiative has faced criticism from the United Postal Trade Unions Federation (UPTUF), which claims that GovPay has caused significant revenue losses for the Sri Lanka Post due to reduced transaction fees from post office-based payments. Despite this, the Ministry of Digital Economy and ICTA have emphasised the long-term benefits of digitalization.

Public reception has been largely positive, particularly for the traffic fine payment system, which has simplified a previously cumbersome process. Awareness programs have further promoted adoption among citizens.

== Challenges and considerations ==
The success of GovPay depends on addressing several challenges:

- Cybersecurity: Ensuring the platform's security against potential cyber threats is critical to maintaining public trust.
- Public Trust: Widespread adoption requires educating citizens about the benefits and safety of digital payments, particularly in rural areas.
- Regulatory Compliance: Adherence to Central Bank guidelines and international standards for digital payments is essential.
- Infrastructure: Reliable internet connectivity and smartphone penetration are necessary for equitable access to the platform.

Analysts have noted that GovPay's implementation amidst Sri Lanka's economic challenges highlights its potential as a digital leap forward, provided these complexities are navigated effectively.

== Future plans ==
The Ministry of Digital Economy aims to unify all government institutions under GovPay, creating a fully integrated digital payment ecosystem. The platform's phased expansion will continue through 2025, with the goal of incorporating 46 institutions by April. Future enhancements may include additional payment methods, such as credit card support for a wider range of services, and integration with emerging fintech solutions.

GovPay is expected to serve as a model for other digital governance initiatives in Sri Lanka, supporting the country's ambition to become a digitally inclusive nation. The platform's success could pave the way for innovations such as biometric authentication and advanced data analytics for government transactions.
