= LOLC Finance =

Sri Lankan non-banking financial company

LOLC Finance PLC
- Logo of LOLC Finance
- Type: Public
- Traded as: CSE: LOFC.N0000; S&P Sri Lanka 20 Index component
- ISIN: LK0392N00007
- Industry: Financial services
- Founded: December 13, 2001; 24 years ago
- Headquarters: Rajagiriya, Sri Lanka
- Number of locations: 219 (2023)
- Key people: Conrad Dias (Chairman); Krishan Thilakaratne (Executive Director/CEO)
- Revenue: ▲LKR69.027 billion (2023)
- Operating income: ▲LKR20.312 billion (2023)
- Net income: ▼LKR15.393 billion (2023)
- Total assets: ▲LKR360.848 billion (2023)
- Total equity: ▲LKR100.808 billion (2023)
- Number of employees: ▼4,273 (2023)
- Parent: LOLC Ceylon Holdings PLC
- Website: www.lolcfinance.com

LOLC Finance PLC is a non-banking financial company based in Sri Lanka and a subsidiary of LOLC Holdings PLC. Established in 2001, the company has grown to become one of the largest non-banking financial institutions (NBFIs) in the country, offering a wide range of financial services including savings, deposits, loans, and alternate financial solutions.

The company is listed on the Colombo Stock Exchange and is ranked among Sri Lanka's leading listed entities in LMD 100. As of 2025, it operates a network of over 200 branches across all provinces in Sri Lanka. LOLC Finance PLC has been assigned an A+ credit rating with a stable outlook by Lanka Rating Agency Ltd. Its brand value has been estimated at over LKR 11 billion, with a corresponding AA+ brand rating.

== History ==
LOLC Finance PLC was incorporated in 2001 as LOLC Finance Company Limited and obtained its license from the Central Bank of Sri Lanka shortly thereafter. In 2003, the company was renamed Lanka ORIX Finance Company Limited and commenced operations.

The company launched its Islamic finance window, LOLC Al-Falaah, in 2008. It was listed on the Colombo Stock Exchange on 7 July 2011. Following regulatory reforms introduced by the Central Bank of Sri Lanka in 2014 aimed at consolidating the financial sector, the LOLC Group initiated restructuring measures.

In 2015, the company was rebranded as LOLC Finance PLC. The proposed merger with LOLC Micro Credit Limited was completed in 2018. Subsequent consolidations included the amalgamation of Commercial Leasing & Finance PLC, Sinhaputhra Finance PLC, and LOLC Development Finance PLC, enabling the company to establish itself as the largest NBFI in Sri Lanka.

== Operations ==
LOLC Finance PLC operates as a diversified financial services provider catering to both individual and corporate customers. The company offers services in savings and deposits, leasing, SME financing, personal finance, and alternate financial solutions.

Following its mergers and acquisitions, LOLC Finance PLC expanded its operational capacity and market presence significantly. It was ranked 32nd in the LMD 100 list of leading listed companies in Sri Lanka for 2024/25. According to Brand Finance, the company is among Sri Lanka's most valuable financial services brands and ranked first within its sector in 2025.

== Products and Services ==
LOLC Finance PLC provides a wide range of financial products and services across several categories.

=== Savings and Deposits ===
- Savings accounts, including general, children's, senior citizen, and specialized accounts.
- Fixed deposits.
- Foreign currency accounts for resident and non-residents.

=== SME and Business Services ===
- Leasing and vehicle financing.
- Three-wheel, motorbike, and agricultural equipment financing.
- Property loans for residential and commercial purposes.
- Green financing solutions.
- Loans secured against fixed deposits.

=== Alternate Financial Services ===
Through its Islamic finance unit, LOLC Al-Falaah, the company offers Shariah-compliant financial products, including:

- Investment products (Mudharabah, Wakalah).
- Personal Finance (Tawarruq)
- Leasing (Ijarah).
- Trade and import financing.
- Property and project financing.
- Working capital financing.

=== Personal Financial Services ===
- Housing loans.
- Business development loans.
- Group loans.

=== Cards ===
- ATM debit cards.
- A range of credit cards under the Mastercard and Visa

== Digital Services ==
LOLC Finance PLC has introduced several digital platforms to enhance customer convenience and promote financial inclusion.

=== iPay ===
iPay is a digital platform enabling users to conduct a wide range of transactions, including merchant payments, fund transfers, bill payments, and government payments. The platform has achieved significant adoption, with over one million downloads and a substantial share of Sri Lanka's JustPay transactions.

iPay Business extends these capabilities to SMEs, offering digital payment acceptance, online payment gateways, and business management tools.

=== LOLC Real Time ===
LOLC Real Time is a mobile and internet banking platform that allows customers to perform fund transfers via CEFT and SLIPs, pay bills, and manage savings accounts.

== Environmental, Social, and Governance (ESG) ==
LOLC Finance PLC has integrated multiple environmental, social and governance (ESG) principles into its business operations, focusing on sustainability, community engagement, and responsible governance.

=== Environmental Initiatives ===
The company has undertaken multiple environmental programs, including:

- ISO 14064-1 greenhouse gas (GHG) verification for four consecutive years.
- Reforestation projects, including a large-scale initiative in Deniyaya involving over 20,000 trees.
- Mangrove ecosystem restoration projects.
- Waste reduction and environmental audits aligned with ISO 14001 standards.

=== Social Impact ===
The organization conducts island-wide financial literacy programs targeting small and medium-sized enterprises (SMEs), aiming to enhance entrepreneurship and financial management skills.

Through its corporate social responsibility initiatives, such as LOLC Divi Saviya, the company has supported disaster relief efforts, education, healthcare, and access to clean water in underserved communities.

== Awards and Recognitions ==
LOLC Finance PLC has received numerous awards for its performance in digital innovation, financial services, and sustainability. These include multiple recognitions at the LankaPay Technnovation Awards, SLIBFI Awards, IFFSA Awards, and National Business Excellence Awards.

The company has also been recognized as one of Sri Lanka's most valuable financial services brands and has received awards for customer service and digital transformation.

== Finances ==
Ten-year financial summary All figures are in LKR (mns)
Year	Interest Income	Profit from Operations	Profit After Tax	Total Assets	Total Equity
2025/26	78,741	30,722	27,406	558,552	155,404
2024/25	68,318	30,799	25,085	429,734	149,524
2023/24	69,027	20,312	15,393	360,848	100,808
2022/23	30,570	19,580	16,951	311,567	83,553
2021/22	33,762	5,053	4,366	170,109	35,889
2020/21	38,082	4,772	3,780	170,225	31,290
2019/20	42,663	8,497	5,963	211,035	22,767
2018/19	23,818	2,434	2,201	211,114	17,106
2017/18	18,450	2,541	1,587	122,623	11,026
2016/17	18,490	2,296	1,427	110,385	9,198

== See also ==
- List of companies listed on the Colombo Stock Exchange
- List of Sri Lankan public corporations by market capitalisation
