= Cargills Bank =

Sri Lankan commercial bank

Cargills Bank PLC
- Logo of Cargills Bank
- Formerly: Cargills Bank Limited (2014-2024)
- Company type: Public
- Traded as: CSE: CBNK.N0000
- ISIN: LK0491N00007
- Industry: Financial services
- Founded: 2014; 11 years ago
- Headquarters: Colombo, Sri Lanka
- Number of locations: 26 branches (2025)
- Key people: Asoka Peiris (Chairman); Senarath Bandara (CEO)
- Revenue: ▲LKR9.489 billion (2022)
- Operating income: ▲LKR4.281 billion (2022)
- Net income: ▲LKR488 million (2022)
- Total assets: ▼LKR53.753 billion (2022)
- Total equity: ▲LKR9.720 billion (2022)
- Owners: Cargills (Ceylon) (39.71%); C T Holdings (25.29%); Employees' Provident Fund (4.98%)
- Number of employees: 598 (2022)
- Website: www.cargillsbank.com

Cargills Bank PLC is a licensed commercial bank in Sri Lanka. It received its license from Central Bank of Sri Lanka to operate domestic and offshore banking business on 21 January 2014 and was ceremonially opened on 30 June 2014. At present the bank consists of 26 branches island-wide with the head office based in Kollupitiya.

== IPO ==
Cargills Bank announced its initial public offering on 30 November 2023. The bank intended to raise LKR500 million through the IPO. The IPO was oversubscribed on its opening day itself. The IPO was also the first by a commercial bank in a decade.

== See also ==
- List of banks in Sri Lanka
- List of companies listed on the Colombo Stock Exchange
