= People's Bank (Sri Lanka) =

State owned commercial bank in Sri Lanka

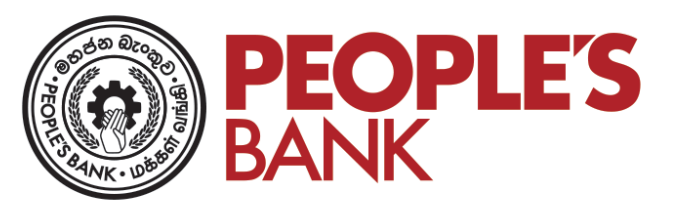

- Type: Government-owned corporation
- Industry: Finance
- Founded: 1961; 65 years ago
- Headquarters: No. 75, Sir Chittampalam A. Gardiner Mawatha, Colombo, Sri Lanka
- Number of locations: ▲747 branches (2024)
- Area served: Sri Lanka
- Key people: Prof. P. N. D. Fernando (Chairman); Clive Fonseka (CEO)
- Products: Banking, financial and related services
- Revenue: ▼ Rs 235.529 billion (US$ 1.016 billion) (2020)
- Operating income: ▼ Rs 25.078 billion (US$ 381.634 million) (2020)
- Net income: ▲ Rs 13.565 billion (US$ 75.432 million) (2020)
- Total assets: ▲ Rs 2,400.567 billion (US$ 11.867 billion) (2020)
- Total equity: ▲ Rs 139.111 billion (US$ 542.706 million) (2020)
- Number of employees: ▼7,692 (2020)
- Parent: Ministry of Finance
- Subsidiaries: People's Leasing Group; People's Travels (Pvt) Ltd.; People's Merchant Bank PLC
- Website: www.peoplesbank.lk

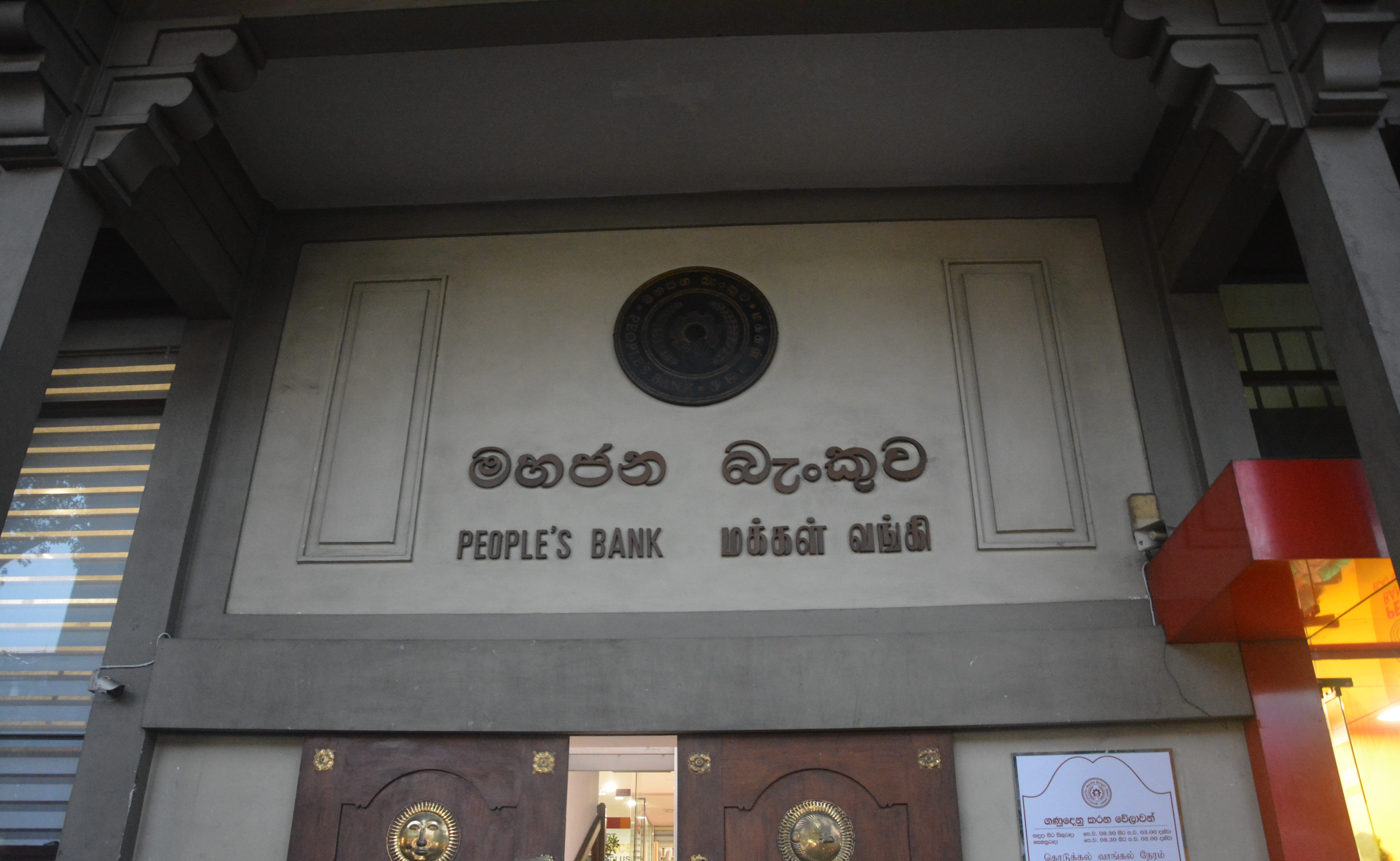
A branch of the bank in Kandy

People's Bank is a state-owned commercial bank in Sri Lanka. The second largest commercial bank in Sri Lanka. Established on 1 July 1961, it has its head-offices at Sir Chittampalam A. Gardiner Street in Colombo. The bank offer both retail and corporate banking services, with a network of 739 local branches, service centers and has an asset base of LKR 1.873 trillion (2019) with over 14 million customers. (70% local customers) People's Bank received a high national long-Term Rating of AA+ by Fitch Rating. People's Bank most awarded state-owned company such as "Green Plus" "Carbon Conscious Award". People's Bank became Sri Lanka's best performing bank. Bank mainly targets small and medium enterprise.

== History ==
People's Bank was inaugurated on 1 July 1961, by T. B. Ilangaratne, Minister of Commerce, Trade, Food, and Shipping. The first branch was opened on Duke Street, Colombo.

=== Expansion in Colombo ===
T.B. Ilangaratne presented new banking soon after 1961 regulations in Colombo took into consideration branch banking in the district, opening the bank's first branch outside Colombo in 1962 in Kandy. By 1977 the bank had 50 financial workplaces in the Western Province.

After the 1971 JVP insurrection the bank launched rural credit scheme to make a small loans to groups of farmers and small scale businesses.

In 1982 People's Bank was operating more than 300 branch with 10,000 employees.

In 1984, People's Bank acquired The People's Merchant Bank, with branches in International Division and the Fort Foreign Branch

=== Expansion outside Colombo ===
Following the passage of the Banking Act 1988 by the Sri Lankan Government, the People's Bank Commercial Bank was set up to claim and work People's Bank and its auxiliaries. People's bank expanded outside Colombo in 1989, with support by the Ministry of Labour to arrange EPF outside Colombo.

New innovations likewise permitted the direct connecting of Visacards with individual financial balances. In 1990, the bank presented the People's card, which changed its name to PET in 1991. In the same year, the company installed the first successful ATM in Colombo.

Company loss of more than Rs. 2 billion on 2019 due to mismanagement and Government corruption, former chairman said.

Asian Development Bank gave the bank a "Trade Deal of the Year" award in 2020. In November 2020 the company reported total assets of Rs. 2.1 trillion. The company served 200 island-wide Self Banking Units. Most urban area branches converted to digital banking protocol.

A+(lka) Fitch Rated People's Leasing & Finance PLC is a wholly owned subsidiary of the People's Bank.(which holds >75%) It is a leading finance and leasing company in Sri Lanka. People's Leasing company started in 1996. It is the highest rated non-bank financial company in Sri Lanka.

Bank launches loan program to local industries. It is called "Made in Sri Lanka". Its aims are to support small and medium business enterprises.

The People's Bank was blacklisted by the Chinese government on 29 October 2021 due to dispute over fertilizer imports from China.

== Products and services ==
=== Bank accounts ===
People's Bank offers a wide range of bank accounts in Sri Lanka, including transaction and saving accounts, term deposits, and oversea accounts.

=== Leasing & Finance ===
People's Leasing and Finance PLC is an auxiliary of People's Bank and trailblazer in offering some incentive added monetary administrations of Sri Lanka.

== See also ==
- Bank of Ceylon
- People's Bank
