= LOLC Holdings =

Sri Lankan conglomerate

LOLC Holdings PLC
- Logo of LOLC Holdings PLC
- Type: Public
- Traded as: CSE: LOLC.N0000
- ISIN: LK0113N00007
- Industry: Conglomerate
- Founded: 1980; 46 years ago
- Headquarters: Rajagiriya, Sri Lanka
- Key people: Ishara Nanayakkara (Deputy Chairman); Kapila Jayawardena (Group Managing Director)
- Products: Financial services, Agriculture and Plantation, Leisure, Renewable energy, Construction, Manufacturing, Trading
- Brands: LOLC, Browns
- Revenue: ▲LKR333.122 billion (2023)
- Operating income: ▼LKR21.911 billion (2023)
- Net income: ▼LKR21.671 billion (2023)
- Total assets: ▲LKR1.566 trillion (2023)
- Total equity: ▲LKR433.974 billion (2023)
- Owners: Ishara Nanayakkara (48.9%); LOLC Capital (Pvt) Ltd (30.99%)
- Number of employees: ▲29,000. (2023)
- Subsidiaries: Seylan Bank; Brown and Company; LOLC Finance
- Website: lolc.com

LOLC Holdings PLC is a Sri Lankan conglomerate listed on the Colombo Stock Exchange (CSE). Originally starting as a non-banking financial company LOLC has grown into one of the largest Sri Lankan conglomerates involved in many sectors and subsidiaries in several countries although it is still mainly involved in the financial sector.

== History ==
LOLC was originally founded as Lanka ORIX Leasing Company (LOLC) which then grew into the LOLC Group. As diversification and growth continued LOLC became a holding company.

By 2019/20 LOLC was among the most profitable companies in Sri Lanka but adopted a strategy of aggressive expansion without paying dividends to fuel overseas expansion in Cambodia, Myanmar, Pakistan, Philippines, Indonesia, Nigeria and Zambia.

In January 2021 the market capitalization of LOLC Holdings exceeded $1Billion.

LOLC using its Browns Investments PLC also became the partner of China Harbour Engineering Company Limited for the development of the Colombo International Financial Center Mixed Development Project. Becoming the first major local investor in the megaproject.

== Subsidiaries ==
LOLC Holdings includes numerous subsidiaries in various sectors and companies with significant ownership by LOLC. These include,

=== Financial ===
- Seylan Bank
- LOLC Finance
- LOLC Development Finance
- LOLC Securities
- LOLC Life Assurance
- LOLC General Insurance
- LOLC Factors
- LOLC Securities
- LOLC Capital One
- LOLC Investments
- LOLC Motors
- Commercial Leasing and Finance
- PRASAC Micro Finance Institution
- LOLC Cambodia
- LOLC Myanmar Micro-finance
- LOLC Al-Falaah
- LOLC Fleet Management
- Sarana Sumut Ventura
- LOLC Finance Zambia
- Fina Trust Microfinance Bank
- Pak Oman Microfinance Bank Ltd

=== Agriculture ===
- Browns Agriculture
- AgStar
- Maturata Plantations
- Gal Oya Plantations

=== Leisure ===
- Browns Hotels and Resorts
- Excel Restaurants Pvt Ltd

=== Energy ===
- Sagasolar Power
- Sunbird Bioenergy Sierra Leone

=== Construction ===
- Browns Engineering and Construction
- Sierra Construction

=== Information Technology ===
- LOLC Technologies

=== Manufacturing ===
- LOLC Advanced Technologies
- Ceylon Graphene Technologies

== Finances ==
Financial Summary
Year	Gross income LKR (mns)	Operating income LKR (mns)	Profit LKR (mns)	Assets LKR (mns)	No. of branches
2022	224,100	57,183	77,596	1,371,469	133
2021	160,482	11,840	53,233	874,944	107
2020	130,442	(3,623)	812	1,335,919	103
2019	124,314	8,441	5,933	1,043,747	103
2018	149,516	22,829	19,190	822,239	100
2017	91,715	9,957	20,921	640,925	99
2016	66,765	8,713	9,331	379,595	89
2015	44,586	5,551	6,299	244,917	85
2014	40,205	2,408	3,069	167,175	87
2013	42,391	1,959	2,552	162,982	80

Source: Annual Report, 2021/22 (pp. 314–315)
