= Bank of Ceylon =

Sri Lankan state-owned commercial bank

- Type: Government-owned corporation
- Industry: Banking, financial services
- Founded: 1939; 87 years ago
- Founder: Sir Ernest de Silva
- Headquarters: No 1 BOC Square, Bank of Ceylon Mawatha, Colombo
- Number of locations: ▲663 (2026)
- Area served: Sri Lanka; Maldives; India; United Kingdom; Seychelles
- Key people: Kavinda de Zoysa (Chairman); Y. A. Jayathilaka (General Manager and Chief Executive Officer)
- Services: Retail banking, corporate banking, investment banking, digital banking, SME banking
- Revenue: ▲LKR 548,623 million (2025)
- Operating income: ▲LKR 246,800 million (2025)
- Net income: Profit Before Tax: ▲LKR 120.8 billion (2025)
- Total assets: ▲LKR 5.5 trillion (2025)
- Total equity: ▲LKR 365.8 billion (2025)
- Number of employees: 8,912 (2025)
- Parent: Ministry of Finance
- Subsidiaries: Bank of Ceylon (UK) Limited (100.00%); BOC IT Solutions (Private) Limited (100.00%); BOC Property Development and Management (Private) Limited (100.00%); BOC Travels (Private) Limited (100.00%); Ceybank Holiday Homes (Private) Limited (100.00%); Hotels Colombo (1963) Limited (99.99%); Merchant Bank of Sri Lanka & Finance PLC (84.50%); MBSL Insurance Company Limited (45.47%); Property Development Limited (97.89%)
- Rating: National long-term rating: AA− (lka); Subordinated debentures: A (lka) by Fitch Ratings Lanka Limited; Brand Strength Rating AAA− Brand Finance
- Website: www.boc.lk

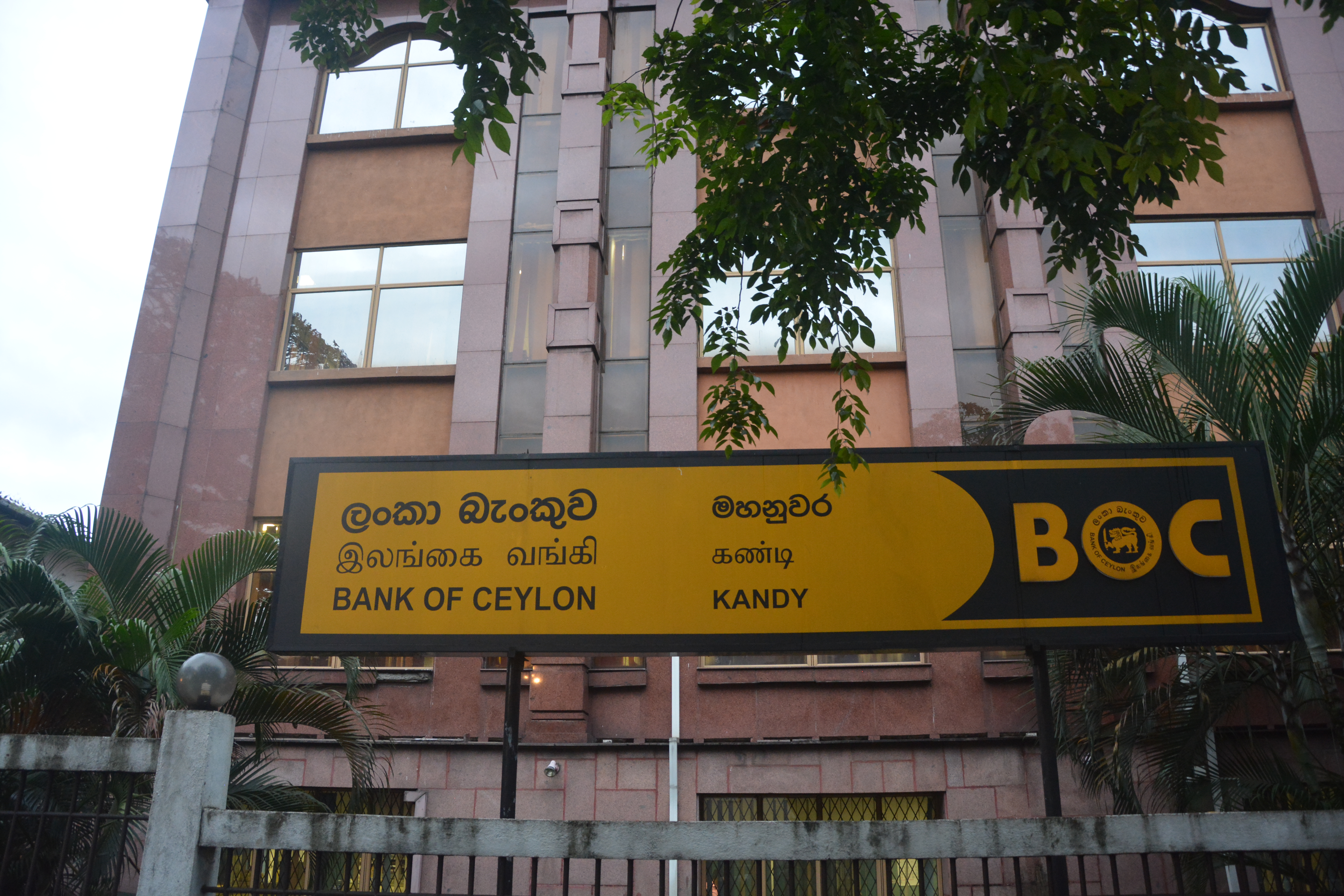
A branch of the bank in Kandy

Bank of Ceylon (BOC; Sinhala: ලංකා බැංකුව Lanka Bænkuwa, Tamil: இலங்கை வங்கி Ilangai Vangi) is a state-owned, major commercial bank in Sri Lanka. Its head office is located in an iconic cylindrical building in Colombo.

The bank has over 2500 customer touch points including, a network of 663 branches, 517 automated teller machines (ATMs), 1001 CRM network, over 250 agent banking centres and 15 regional loan centres within the country. It also has an around-the-clock call centre and an around the clock branch at its Colombo office.

In addition to the local presence, the bank maintains an off-shore banking unit in the head office in Colombo, three branches in Malé, Chennai, and Seychelles, and a subsidiary in London.

== History ==
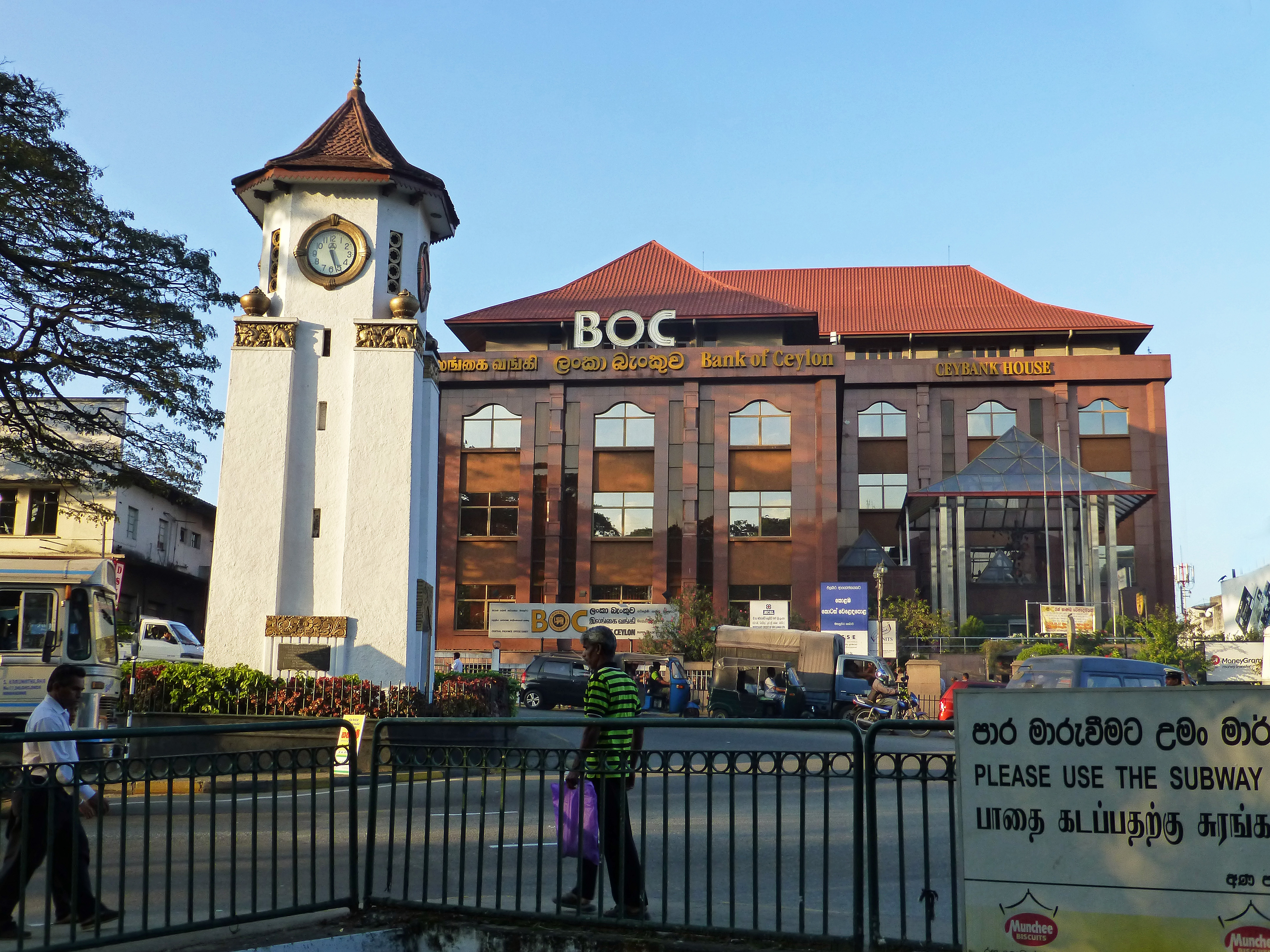
Kandy Clock Tower and Bank of Ceylon Kandy branch

Bank of Ceylon (BOC) was founded in 1939, with Sir Ernest de Silva as its first chairman. At the time, Ceylon was a British colony and the then governor Sir Andrew Caldecott ceremoniously opened the bank on 1 August. The British government introduced the banking arm for its government-oriented businesses. Two years later, in 1941, BoC started to expand beyond the city of Colombo. It opened its first branch in Kandy. Subsequently, BOC added branches in major cities such as Galle, Jaffna, Kurunegala, Batticaloa, Trincomalee, Badulla, and Panadura.

- 1948: Ceylon obtained her independence from the British; the monetary authorities were transferred to Sri Lanka. The Central Bank of Sri Lanka was established in 1949 and it assumed responsibility for monetary policy and bank regulation.
- 1949: BoC opened its first overseas branch in London, United Kingdom. The branch helped the bank and the government handle their international business.
- 1953: Chelliah Loganathan was the first Sri Lankan appointed as General Manager and Chief Executive Officer. He resigned in 1969.
- 1961: T. B. Ilangaratne, Minister of Commerce, Trade, Food and Shipping oversaw the nationalisation of the bank.
- 1972: The then government declared the name of the country to be Sri Lanka. However, the bank did not rename itself accordingly. The government also passed the Agricultural Productivity Law, which forced the bank to open Agrarian Service Centre branches in almost all villages in the country. As a result, the branch network of the bank expanded tremendously to the majority of Sri Lanka's rural areas.
- 1979: the then government relaxed the exchange control regulations. This liberalization of exchange control regulations led the bank to open its first Foreign Currency Unit to handle the booming demand for non-local currency business.
- 1981: BOC passed another big milestone by opening the second overseas branch, this one in Malé, Maldives.
- 1982: BOC founded the first merchant bank in Sri Lanka, which was named the Merchant Bank of Sri Lanka.
- 1987: The bank moved into its 32-storey headquarters. Sri Lankans have nicknamed the building (Pittu bambuwa "පිට්ටු බම්බුව") a Sinhalese term used for a cylindrical cooking implement. The new building enabled the bank to house all its administrative offices and central operations in one location.
- 1989: The bank joined with the Visa International to introduce the first credit cards business to Sri Lanka.
- 1994: BOC joined SWIFT at the SWIFT BIC BCEYLKLX along with 15 other financial institutions in Sri Lanka.
- 1995: BOC expanded its foreign operations by opening its third foreign branch in Karachi, Pakistan and fourth in Chennai, India. This facilitated the bank's operations in the Asian Clearing Union.
- 2003: BOC took a 15% stake in newly formed Dawood Bank in Pakistan, which was later renamed as Burj Bank. BOC then transferred all its operations in Pakistan to the new bank.
- 2010: BOC converted its branch in London to a subsidiary.
- 2014: BOC started its commercial operations in Seychelles.
- 2015: BOC signed a memorandum of understanding with the Bank of Tokyo-Mitsubishi UFJ.

== See also ==
- List of banks in the world
- List of banks in Sri Lanka
- List of banks in Asia
