= COVID-19 pandemic in Sri Lanka =

Ongoing COVID-19 viral pandemic in Sri Lanka

- Disease: COVID-19
- Pathogen: SARS-CoV-2
- Location: Sri Lanka
- First outbreak: Wuhan, Hubei, China
- Index case: Colombo
- Date: 27 January 2020 – ongoing (6 years, 7 months, 4 weeks and 1 day)
- Confirmed cases: 671,776
- Recovered: 654,919
- Deaths: 16,814
- Fatality rate: 2.5%

Government website
- epid.gov.lk https://hpb.health.gov.lk/

The COVID-19 pandemic in Sri Lanka is part of the ongoing worldwide pandemic of coronavirus disease 2019 (COVID-19) caused by the severe acute respiratory syndrome coronavirus 2 (SARS-CoV-2) virus. The first case of the virus in Sri Lanka was confirmed on 27 January 2020, after a 44-year-old Chinese woman from Hubei, China, was admitted to the Infectious Disease Hospital in Angoda, Sri Lanka. As of 15 December 2022, a total of 671,776 COVID-19 cases had been recorded in the country, 654,919 patients had recovered from the disease, and 16,814 patients had died.

The first reported case involving a Sri Lankan outside the country was reported in Italy on 3 March 2020. As of 23 March 2020, forty-five quarantine centres had been built in the country by the Sri Lanka Army as a preventative measure in an attempt to stop the spread of the pandemic. Nearly 3,500 people were placed under quarantine in 45 quarantine centres, including 31 foreigners from 14 countries. As of 25 March 2020, Sri Lankan authorities tracked down over 14,000 people who had come into contact with identified patients, and ordered those people to self-quarantine. As of 16 April 2020, Sri Lanka was named the 16th highest-risk country for contracting the virus. In April 2020, Sri Lanka's response to the pandemic was ranked as the 9th best in the world.

Although Sri Lanka was successful in handling the first wave of the pandemic, the government's failure to handle the second and the third waves of the pandemic caused a spike in COVID-19 deaths after November 2020. There was a sudden increase in COVID-19 cases after the relaxation of health restrictions during the Sinhala and Tamil New Year in April 2021. The highly contagious Delta variant was responsible for the considerably high fatality rate in the country in August 2021, when Sri Lanka became the country with the fourth-largest number of daily deaths in the world by population, behind just Georgia, Tunisia, and Malaysia. Government negligence in implementing a lockdown, negligent behaviour of the general public, and teachers' protests have all contributed to the record spike of COVID-19 cases and deaths in the country.

On 20 August 2021, government imposed a ten-day lockdown island-wide to curb the spread of COVID-19 cases. The decision to lockdown the country came following the immense pressure from the health authorities and the political parties who demanded complete lockdown after Sri Lanka surpassed 1,000 deaths over the course of eight days. It is believed that the COVID-19 cases in the country are underreported by the officials and allegations regarding the manipulation of details regarding the COVID-19 pandemic in the country were also raised.

Some businesses imposed a voluntary lockdown for a period of 10 to 14 days during the early parts of August when the government refused to impose a lockdown due to the worsening situation of the economy. The Central Bank of Sri Lanka raised interest rates in August 2021, and Sri Lanka became the first nation in Asia to tighten the monetary policy during the pandemic era. On 27 August 2021, the government extended the lockdown to 6 September 2021 as the daily death toll surpassed 200 for the first time since the pandemic began.

== Background ==
On 12 January 2020, the World Health Organization (WHO) confirmed that a novel coronavirus was the cause of a respiratory illness in a cluster of people in Wuhan City, Hubei Province, China. This illness had been reported to the WHO on 31 December 2019.

While the case fatality ratio for COVID-19 was much lower than the SARS outbreak in 2003, its transmission rate of the virus was significantly greater with a significant total death toll. Quarantine law in Sri Lanka is governed by the Quarantine and Prevention of Disease Ordinance No 3 of 1897.

== Timeline ==
=== First wave (until October 2020) ===
==== 27 January – 9 March 2020 ====
Prior to 27 January, the Sri Lankan Ministry of Health instructed staff at Bandaranaike International Airport to screen passengers for symptoms. Additionally, the ministry issued a recommendation that infants, children, pregnant women, the elderly, and people who have chronic diseases should avoid visiting crowded places when possible. The Ministry of Health set up a 22-member National Action Committee to help limit the spread of the virus. The Department of Immigration and Emigration informed all construction sites with Chinese resident visa holders to restrict their Chinese employees to their respective workplaces and lodgings.

On 27 January, the first confirmed case of the virus was reported in Sri Lanka, a 44-year-old Chinese woman from Hubei Province in China. She had arrived as a tourist with another group of travellers and had been screened at the Bandaranaike International Airport after having a high fever. She fully recovered and was released from the hospital on 19 February.

Following the first reported case of COVID-19, demand for face masks in the country increased and the country began to face a mask shortage. Some pharmacies in the country had sold all their face masks and there were reports from customers that face masks were being sold at over 10 to 20 times the original price; as a result, the country's drug regulatory agency placed price controls on face masks. 33 Sri Lankan students and families were evacuated from Wuhan on 1 February and quarantined at a military facility at Diyatalawa. They were released after two weeks on 14 February.

During first week of March, visitors from Italy, Iran, and South Korea have been required to quarantine for two weeks at one of two facilities. On 10 March 186 people (164 Sri Lankan nationals, 20 Italian nationals, and 2 South Korean nationals) were placed under quarantine in Batticaloa.

==== 10–23 March 2020 ====
On 10 March, the first case of COVID-19 in a Sri Lankan citizen, a 52-year-old tour guide working with a group of Italians, was reported. After testing positive, he was brought to the Infectious Disease Hospital (IDH) in Angoda for treatment. 29 patients received treatment in government hospitals, including eight foreigners. Sri Lanka suspended all on-arrival visas for tourists on 11 March.

On 12 March, another Sri Lankan citizen tested positive for COVID-19, a 44-year-old person, who had reportedly stayed with the first Sri Lankan patient diagnosed with the virus.

On 13 March, three more patients tested positive for the virus in Sri Lanka. One of them was a 41-year-old Sri Lankan male who had arrived from Germany, and was admitted to the IDH in Angoda. The other two patients were from a group of people who had been quarantined at a facility in Kandakadu. One was a 37-year-old who had arrived from Italy, and was treated at the Polonnaruwa Hospital, Polonnaruwa. The other was a 43-year-old male who had also arrived from Italy, and he was sent to the Infectious Disease Hospital in Angoda.

On 14 March, five patients tested positive for COVID-19 in Sri Lanka; four of them returned from Italy. It was also reported that one of the co-pilots of SriLankan Airlines became infected with the coronavirus and attended the annual Royal–Thomian Big Match between S. Thomas' College, Mount Lavinia, and the Royal College, Colombo.

On 15 March, seven people tested positive, making the overall case count 18. The surge of new cases caused the government to declare 16 March a public holiday, which was extended to 19 March. On 16 March, 10 more people tested positive for a total of 28, and on 17 March, another 15 people tested positive, increasing the total to 43. On 17 March, the secretary to the Ministry of Defence, Kamal Gunaratne revealed that around 170 passengers who returned from Italy and South Korea had skipped the quarantine procedure.

On 18 March, two people fully recovered from the disease while seven people tested positive, bringing the total case count to 50. On 19 March, nine more people tested positive, bumping the total case count to 59. One patient at the Ragama Hospital exposed several staff to the virus, and the entire hospital ward had to be closed down and the staff were quarantined. On 20 March, 11 people tested positive for a total case count of 70. Most of the new cases on that day were reported from the Gampaha district. On 21 March, six more people tested positive, pushing the total case count to 77. An army officer who escorted Sri Lankans to quarantine centres also contracted the disease.

On 22 March, the first confirmed COVID-19 case in Jaffna was recorded. The patient was believed to have maintained close relationships with a senior pastor who had tested positive for COVID-19. Five more people tested positive for the virus on 22 March, making the total number of cases 82. On 23 March, five people tested positive for a total case count of 87. On 23 March, the country's first citizen who had tested positive was released from the hospital after showing improvement during recovery.

==== 24–31 March 2020 ====
On 24 March, the assistant of a church pastor was reported to have tested positive for COVID-19. A father-son duo who attended Friday Jummah prayers on 20 March at the Jami Ul-Alfar Mosque also tested positive for COVID-19. Six more cases were reported on 25 March, bringing the total case count to 106. No new confirmed cases were reported in the country on 26 March and 27 March, according to Army General Shavendra Silva.

On 26 March, a recent returnee from abroad contracted COVID-19, and came into contact with 26 people in his village, which entered a lockdown. The next day, the father and sister of the patient tested positive for COVID-19, and they were admitted to the Kalutara Nagoda Hospital. Three villages were placed under lockdown: Bandaragama-Atalugama, Kandy-Akurana, and Puttalam-Kadayamkulam.

On 28 March, the first confirmed death from COVID-19 was recorded in Sri Lanka: a 60-year-old patient from Marawila who had a kidney transplant and had a history of diabetes and high blood pressure. The body was cremated within 15 hours. On 30 March, the second death from COVID-19, a 60-year-old man from Negombo, was reported. Five more people tested positive for COVID-19, including a four-month-old baby on 30 March, bringing the total to 122.

On 30 March, five villages in Beruwala with a total population of over 100 were quarantined after an airport driver tested positive for the virus.

==== 1 April 2020 – 15 April 2020 ====
On 4 April, Director General of Health Services Dr. Anil Jasinghe confirmed the death of a fifth patient from COVID-19, and their body was cremated in the afternoon. On the same day, seven more patients were confirmed to have contracted COVID-19, bringing the total case count to 162.

On 4 April, Anton Sebastianpillai, a Sri Lankan-born British geriatrician and author, died after testing positive for COVID-19.

On 5 and 6 April, 12 new COVID-19 cases were recorded and on next day for a total case count of 178. On 7 April, an 80-year-old male from Dehiwala died, and became the sixth person to die from COVID-19. On the same day, seven more patients tested positive for the disease, bringing the total case count to 185. On 8 April, four patients tested positive for COVID-19, increasing the total case count to 189, and the seventh COVID-19-related death was reported. On 9 and 10 April, nine people tested positive for COVID-19, bringing the total case count to 197.

On 12 April, 11 people tested positive for the virus. On 13 April, eight people tested positive for COVID-19, bringing the total case count to 218. On 14 April, 15 people tested positive for COVID-19, bringing the total to 233.

==== 16 April 2020 – 30 April 2020 ====
On 17 April, seven new cases were reported. Between 18 and 19 April, 27 people tested positive for COVID-19, bringing the total number of infections to 271.

On 20 April, 33 people from Colombo tested positive for COVID-19, increasing the total case count to 303; it was the highest number of new COVID-19 cases in a single day until 26 April. On 23 April, 38 people tested positive for COVID-19, bringing the total to 368; 30 of the cases were sailors from the Welisara Navy camp that placed people under quarantine. On 24 April, 52 people tested positive for COVID-19, bringing the total up to 420. Over 60 navy personnel tested positive within 2 days. These officers had been on duty in Ja-Ela when they were exposed.

On 25 April, 40 people tested positive for COVID-19. On 26 April, 62 new cases of the virus were reported, including several from naval bases. On 27 April, 65 people tested positive for the virus, bringing the total to 588. On 28 April, 31 people tested positive for the virus, which brought the total to 619. On 29 April, 30 new cases were reported for a total of 649. On 30 April, 16 new cases were reported.

==== 1 May 2020 – 21 May 2020 ====
On 1 May, 25 people tested positive for the virus. On 2 May, the 700th COVID-19 patient became infected, along with 14 other patients. The total number of cases increased to 705, with 182 patients recovering. On 3 May, 13 more people tested positive for the virus. On 4 May, Sri Lanka reported its 8th COVID-19 death. 37 people tested positive for the virus on the same day.

On 5 May, another person died of the virus for a total death count of 9. On the same day, 16 people tested positive for the virus, bringing the total case count to 771. On 6 May, 29 people tested positive for COVID-19, mostly navy personnel, bringing the total case count up to 797.

On 7 May, Sri Lanka recorded its 800th COVID-19 patient, along with 27 others. On 8 and 9 May, 23 people tested positive for the virus, bringing the total to 847. On 10 May, 16 people tested positive for COVID-19, 13 of which were Sri Lankan Navy officers.

On 11 May, six people tested positive for the virus. On 12 May, 20 people tested positive for the virus, which increased the total case count to 889. On 13 May, the total case count exceeded 900 with 26 new COVID-19 cases. On 14 May, 10 people tested positive, bringing the total to 925. On 15 May, 10 more people tested positive for the disease. On 16 May, the total case count increased to 960.

On 17 May, the total case count rose to 981 with 21 new cases. The next day, the case count increased to 992 with 11 new cases. On 19 May, 35 people tested positive for the virus, which brought the total case count to 1,027 total cases. On 20 May, one person tested positive for the virus. On 21 May, another 27 people tested positive for the virus, bringing the total to 1,055.

==== 22 May 2020 – 28 June 2020 ====
On 22 May, 13 people tested positive for the virus, bringing the total case count to 1068. On the next day, the total increased to 1089 with 21 new cases, 19 of which were Sri Lanka Navy sailors. Until 24 May, the Sri Lanka Army maintained 26 quarantine facilities.

On 24 May, 52 people tested positive, which brought the total case count to 1,140. On 25 May, 41 people, all returning from Kuwait, tested positive for the virus. On the same day, Dr. Anil Jasinghe confirmed Sri Lanka's 10th death from COVID-19. On 26 May 137 people tested positive for the virus, which brought the total to 1,318. The total rose to 1,469 the next day, when 150 patients tested positive for COVID-19. On 28 May, 61 people tested positive for a total of 1,530. On 29 May, 28 people tested positive for the virus, which increased the total to 1,558.

On 30 May, 62 people tested positive for COVID-19, which brought the total to 1620. On 31 May, 16 people tested positive. On 1 June, 10 people tested positive, while one died from the virus. 40 people tested positive for the virus on 2 June, and another 66 people tested positive on 3 June. On 4 June, 48 people tested positive, bringing the total to 1,797.

After 4 June, the rate of new COVID-19 cases drastically reduced. On 28 June, the Sri Lankan government stated that no community transmission had occurred since April 30 and no deaths from the disease had occurred since 1 June as reasons for lifting the nationwide curfew.

=== Second wave (4 October – present) ===
==== 4 October 2020 – 19 October 2020 ====
On 4 October, an outbreak occurred in Minuwangoda and Divulapitiya, and a curfew was enforced. Governments were reluctant to enforce another lockdown for fear of bankrupting businesses and their employees out of their livelihood.

Sri Lanka's Bureau of Foreign Employment said that since 8 October, 67 Sri Lankan migrant workers died from COVID-19; the deaths were mostly reported from Middle Eastern countries. More than 2600 Middle Eastern workers tested positive for COVID-19. An employee at the Brandix Minuwangoda textile factory tested positive for the virus, and their family were sent to the IDH hospital. The University Grants Commission announced that Kelaniya University, Gampaha Wickramarachchi Ayurveda Institute, and Naiwala Advanced Technological Institute were to close for one week. On 12 October 2020, the Hela Clothing group said an employee tested positive at its Thihariya plant, which was closed. Later, the government announced that the lockdown in Gampaha district would continue for a few more days. On 12 October, 90 new COVID-19 cases were reported, bringing the total case count in the Minuwangoda cluster to 1397. Lieutenant General Shavendra Silva said: "questions are being raised if we have the facilities to quarantine more people. If the need arises we have the facilities in place to quarantine more people". At the same time, an employee working at the South Asian Textiles garment factory tested positive for COVID-19. On 12 October 2020, 12 Lanka Electricity Company employees working at the Kandana branch tested positive for the virus. 120 people were arrested for curfew violation in lockdown areas. On 13 October, the total case count in the Minuwangoda cluster rose to 1446.

On 18 October 2020, four monks in the Ovitigala Temple in Matugama, Kalutara District, tested positive for COVID-19, according to Matugama Medical Officer P. D. Lionel. A nurse, who worked at the Hirdaramani apparel factory in Kahathuduwa, tested positive for the disease; she had been in contact with a COVID-19 patient. All passengers departing Sri Lanka were asked to take PCR tests for the virus within 72 hours of their departure. Minister of Finance Mahinda Rajapaksa said that a payment of Rs 5,000 would be made to any affected family in the Gampaha District curfew areas.

On 19 October 2020, the Negombo shopping complex closed after a clothing store owner and his wife tested positive for COVID-19; they had attended a wedding ceremony in Divulapitiya. 50 dockyard employees were quarantined after five staff members tested positive. Sri Lanka Public Health Inspectors' Union said that 212 Katunayake Investment Zone employees tested positive for the virus, as well as two families of a police sergeant assigned to a police station on Armor Street, Colombo, which was temporarily suspended for several hours. A close contact of a COVID-19 patient from the Minuwangoda was instructed to self-quarantine. A bus conductor operating from the Point Pedro depot tested positive for COVID-19.

==== 20 October 2020 – 31 October 2020 ====
On 20 October 2020, a Special Investigation Unit police inspector tested positive for COVID-19. The government placed a curfew in the Kuliyapitiya area. Police spokesman DIG Ajith Rohana stated that vehicles travelling from Colombo to Kandy were not allowed to stop in curfew areas. The total number of people who recovered from COVID-19 increased to 3,644.

On 21 October 2020, the Fort police station re-opened. The Sri Lankan Army built the Kandakadu Special Hospital. The Peliyagoda Fish Market immediately closed after several COVID-19 cases were reported there.

On 22 October 2020, four police officers, who tested positive COVID-19 at the Bambalapitiya Police Station, were instructed to self-quarantine; they were also posted at the Peliyagoda Fish Market. The government imposed a curfew for Kotahena, Mattakuliya, Modara, Wellampitiya, Bloemendhal and Grandpass. Five areas in the Kalutara District were labeled as isolated areas, including Agalawatta, Gorakgoda, Beragoda, Dapiligoda, and Kekulandara North. Later, Chief Epidemiologist Samaraweera announced that 13 districts were affected by the second wave of the virus, and that there was a high possibility of it spreading into 12 other districts. 50 new cases were reported from the Minuwangoda cluster, and 22 cases in the Katunayaka Trade Zone. Six cases were reported in the Peliyagoada Fish Market and 22 cases were in direct contact with people in the Minuwangoda cluster.

On 23 October 2020, 609 new COVID-19 cases were reported, and included cases from 48 quarantine centres. The total case count rose up to 6,896. Minister of Health Pavithra Wanniarachchi said that 30 hospitals and 3,500 beds had been allocated for COVID-19 patients. The Government Medical Officers' Association said that people should go for immediate zonal lockdown after identifying the spread of COVID-19. 45 Colombo port customs officers were sent to self-quarantine. 200 workers took PCR tests, and 45 of them tested positive for COVID-19.

On the same day, more than 400,000 PCR tests were performed. Beruwala harbour closed after it reported 10 out of 16 positive PCR tests. Fish markets and fisheries harbours closed islandwide due to the Peliyagoda cluster. At the end of the day, COVID-19 cases rose up to 850. On 24 October, the government implemented a quarantine curfew in Maradana and Dematagoda, effective until 26 October. On the same day, 71 people were arrested for violating lockdown, and a man from Kandakkuliya, Kalpitiya, died at the Kalpitiya hospital while waiting for a PCR test. Around 40,000 people were under quarantine restrictions. The Nugegoda weekly fair was temporarily closed, as one person tested positive for COVID-19.

During this period, the WHO informed the Health Ministry that they had approved various vaccines for COVID-19 and that Sri Lanka was to expect a shipment of them. The Temple of the Sacred Tooth Relic in Kandy implemented safety restrictions its services for residents of areas under curfew: visitors had to carry their valid National Identity Card or Vehicle License Card, wear a face mask, and stay at least 1 m away from other people. The government imposed a quarantine on Gothatuwa and Mulleriyawa. A staff member at the Shangri-La Hotel in Colombo tested positive for COVID-19. A staff member who worked at the Hilton Colombo also tested positive. The Colombo Manning Market announced that it would close its doors until November. The Hilton Hotel and Galle Face Hotel temporarily closed due to employees testing positive for COVID-19.

On 25 October 2020, the government imposed a curfew on Fort, Pettah, Borella and Welikada effective from 6:00 p.m. Special Police Teams were deployed to arrest curfew violators. A 70-year-old man died from COVID-19, marking the country's 16th COVID-19-related death. On 26 October 2020, the total number of COVID-19 cases increased to 7,521. Ten more Police Special Task Force officers tested positive for the virus. The closure of fishing harbours was detrimental to the country's vast fishing sector, with supplies of fish that could not be picked up. On 27 October 2020, three more COVID-19-related deaths were recorded. The government imposed a curfew on several areas, including Homagama, Moratuwa, and Panadura.

On 28 October 2020, the Western Province was placed under quarantine and a curfew was imposed. 15 police officers tested positive for COVID-19 in the Western Province, 96 police officers were sent to quarantine centres, and 708 officers self-quarantined. On 29 October 2020, two employees from the Elephant House Head Office tested positive for the virus. The Nuwara Eliya District was placed under quarantine after 30 people tested positive for the virus. The Sri Lankan Parliament announced it would not meet until 3 November. On the same day, Dr. Hemantha Herath advised people in the Colombo area to stay in the area.

Government offices in the Western Province switched to a work-at-home system. The Wilgoda police area in the Kurunegala District was placed under quarantine due to a surge in COVID-19 cases. The total number of COVID-19 cases in Sri Lanka surpassed 10,000.

On 31 October, about 12,000 PCR tests were conducted, and seven Borella police officers tested positive for COVID-19.

==== 1 November 2020 – 8 November 2020 ====
On 1 November 2020, a quarantine curfew was re-imposed in the Western Province, Kurunegala, Ratapura, and Kuliyapitiya. On 2 November 2020, a COVID-19-positive man committed suicide. Eight Borella police officers tested positive for COVID-19 on 10 November. On 3 November 2020, the Isurupaya Education head office closed after employees tested positive for COVID-19.

On 4 November, the Sri Lankan Government reported that it spent Rs. 7.3 billion on COVID-19 relief in October. On 5 November 2020, six inmates and one police officer tested positive for COVID-19. Five more deaths were reported, bringing the total death toll to 29. On 6 November 2020, 75 customs officers were placed under quarantine after 8 tested positive. The total number of active COVID-19 infections rose to 12,570.

On 7 November 2020, seven prisoners from Bogambara Prison tested positive for COVID-19. On 8 November 2020, 235 police officers in the Western Province tested positive for COVID-19.

==== 1 January 2021 – present ====
On 22 January 2021, Sri Lanka's National Medical Regulatory Authority announced that it approved the Oxford–Astra-Zeneca vaccine.

In June 2021, it was reported that a lion named Thor that lived in the Dehiwala Zoo since 2012 tested positive for COVID-19.

As of 8 July 2021, the total number of reported COVID-19 cases had surpassed 268,000, and the death toll had risen to over 3,300.

== Clusters ==
=== Welisara Navy Camp cluster ===
After identifying a COVID-19 positive patient from Polonnaruwa, a sailor from Welisara Navy camp, the camp was immediately quarantined: around 4000 people at the Navy Camp, including sailors and their families, were held within the camp. On 23 April, 30 sailors tested positive for the virus, with the count rising to 58 the next day. Due to the spread, all sailors were recalled to the camp and transferred to Colombo for further testing. Those that associated with sailors in the camp were instructed to self-quarantine. On 24 April, the camp was declared an isolated area. As of 28 April 148 sailors from the Welisara Naval Complex, 45 sailors on leave, and 13 others were traced to have been in contact with the infected sailors. According to Jasinghe on 28 April, the Welisara cluster included 209 people, with 148 inside the camp and 45 outside the camp on leave.

=== Kandakadu cluster ===
On 7 July, an inmate in the Welikada Prison tested positive for COVID-19. On the same day, another COVID-19 cluster was declared in the Kandakadu Rehabilitation Centre. Two people from Welikanda, five from Rajanganaya, and one each from Habaraduwa and Lankapura tested positive for COVID-19. They were confirmed to be close associates of inmates in the Kandakadu Rehabilitation Centre.

=== Minuwangoda and Divulapitiya cluster ===
On 4 October 2020, a 39-year-old woman employed in an apparel manufacturing facility in Gampaha tested positive for COVID-19. It was revealed that she was working in the Brandix garment factory in Minuwangoda. 45 of her close contacts were quarantined. Subsequently, a police curfew assisted by the army was imposed on Minuwangoda and Divulapitya. On 4 October, the total number of new infections rose to 101 due to the number of infections reported from the Minuwangoda apparel factory. On the same day, the Ministry of Education announced that it was considering to hold or postpone the Scholarship Examination and the GCE. Advanced Level examinations scheduled to start on 11 and 12 October, respectively. PCR tests were conducted on over 2,000 employees of the garment factory. On 6 October, Sri Lankan Army Commander Lt. General Shavendra Silva stated at a press conference that the total number of cases from the Brandix cluster reached 706. In the Gampaha district, 11 police areas were put under curfew after 100 cases were reported. On 7 October, new reports stated that 1026 garment factory workers tested positive for the virus. One COVID-19 patient was found in another Brandix garment factory in Welisara. On the same day, the Ministry of Education announced that the Scholarship and Advanced Level would not be postponed. On 8 October the government said that the total number of confirmed cases rose to 4,469 (Minuwangoda garment factory cluster number of cases up to 1,044). New COVID-19 cases were reported in 16 districts on 8 October. On 9 October, the Government Information Department said that the Minuwangoda cluster increased to 1,053 cases. On 10 October, the number of total cases on the island reached 4,626. On 11 October 2020, 1,307 total COVID-19 cases were reported from the Minuwangoda and Divulapitya cluster. 49 garment employees tested positive for COVID-19 on 13 October. Silva said 85% of the families of Brandix garment factory employees tested positive for the virus. They moved to 96 quarantine facilities with more than 10,000 people undergoing the quarantine process. On 17 October, Gampha District allowed the purchase of groceries and medicine for a few hours.

=== Alleged violation of quarantine protocol ===
On 7 October, Opposition MPs Harsha de Silva and Manusha Nanayakkara inquired whether the new cluster emerged from the transmission of the virus from Indian nationals invited by Brandix. They also claimed that Brandix's chief of security escorted them out of the airport without being tested for COVID-19 and violating quarantine procedures.

Brandix responded, saying that no parties from India accessed its Minuwangoda facility, and no Indian material was used there. The company also stated that they chartered three flights from Visakhapatnam, India, for its Sri Lankan employees working in India and their families, and that they properly followed government-mandated protocol including PCR testing and 14-day quarantine at a government-regulated quarantine facility.

=== University cases ===
The Bambalapitiya branch of ICBT Campus became a COVID-19 hotspot, as one of the students of the college who visited the campus on 4 October 2020 tested positive for COVID-19.

A female student from the University of Sri Jayewardenepura's third-year management faculty tested positive COVID-19 on 10 October. The university vice-chancellor, Sudantha Liyanage, said 50 students of the Management Faculty were placed under self-isolation. The student's mother was a nurse who worked in the ICU of the Panadura General Hospital, which immediately closed the ICU and tested 20 ICU crew members. On 12 October 2020, another two students positive.

On 11 October 2020, a reported new COVID-19 case involved a female student of University of Kelaniya's social science faculty. In the University of Ruhuna, a student's father tested for COVID-19 on 12 October. The student and her roommate were quarantined.

=== Colombo National Hospital ===
On 10 October 2020, Colombo National Hospital announced that three minor staff tested positive for COVID-19. Two wards were temporarily closed.

=== Katunayaka Investment Zone ===
On 12 October 2020, seven people tested positive for COVID-19 in the Katunayaka Investment Zone. On 13 October, 42 more employees tested positive for COVID-19.

=== Peliyagoda fish market cluster ===
On 21 October, several new cases were reported at the Peliyagoda fish market. The first recorded patient lived in Dompe. After a few hours, the fish market closed and all the workers self-quarantined, with 105 individuals taking PCR tests.

496 new cases were reported on 23 October. 20 harbour workers at the Beruwala fisheries tested positive for COVID-19, due to close contact with the Peliyagoda cluster. Some time later, all major fisheries were closed. 535 patients were reported at the Peliyagoda fish market with 217 close contacts.

=== Other ===
Mannar

On 11 October 2020, the Sri Lankan Army commander said that Periakadei and Pattithottam, two villages in the Mannar district, would be isolated due to five people from the area testing positive for COVID-19.

Lanka Electricity Company

On 12 October 2020, the Ja-Ela public inspector said that 12 employees of the Kandana Lanka Electricity Company had tested positive for COVID-19.

Katunayaka Airport

On 12 October 2020, SriLankan Airlines confirmed media reports that a cargo operator employee who worked at the Bandaranaike International Airport tested positive for COVID-19.

Bank of Ceylon

On 13 October 2020, the husband of an employee of the Bank of Ceylon's Ratmalana branch tested positive for COVID-19.

Sri Lankan Navy second wave

Two Sri Lankan Navy officers tested positive for COVID-19 on 17 October 2020, and were sent to the National Operation Center.

== Response ==
The Sri Lankan government has requested that the general public practice proper hygiene methods and self-quarantine methods to safeguard from the disease.

On 14 March, the Sri Lankan government declared 16 March 2020 a national public holiday to contain the pandemic.

On 15 March, Sri Lankan president Gotabaya Rajapaksa proposed plans to combat COVID-19 to the South Asian Association for Regional Cooperation leaders during a video press conference arranged by the Indian prime minister, Narendra Modi. Rajapaksa directed the authorities to implement proper quarantine centres to examine foreigners and ordered relevant authorities to provide necessary essential services to the general public via the Internet.

On 16 March, the Government Medical Officers Association (GMOA) requested President Gotabaya Rajapaksa to extend the public holiday to one week, and close all ports of entry into the country. The government extended the public holiday to three days from 17 March to 19 March due to increase in new cases except for health, banking, food supply, and transportation.

On 17 March 2020, Rajapaksa stated that Sri Lanka had not reached a full-time quarantine level and criticised the comparisons regarding the country's situation with lockdown in Italy, which was urged by the Sri Lankan general public on social media. He also ordered the banking sector to not overburden the coronavirus-hit business sector, which was unable to repay loans, and ordered the banking sector to further extend the payback period to another six months.

The Minister of Health, Pavithra Wanniarachchi, revealed that around 24 hospitals were available to tackle the coronavirus emergency.

On 19 March, the government extended the public holiday to eight days from 20 March to 27 March to both private and public sectors as a remedy to confront the coronavirus pandemic. The government urged the public to work at home and declared a "work from home period" for those eight days. The government also planned to convert the former Voice of America relay station into a COVID-19 treating hospital.

On 21 March, the government strictly cautioned that younger children and older people should not be allowed to go to the supermarket and urged only one person per family to visit the supermarket to avoid unnecessary gatherings. The government also urged the public to not buy chloroquine, which is used to treat patients diagnosed with malaria.

On 23 March, Rajapaksa introduced a relief fund called "COVID-19 Healthcare and Social Security Fund" to combat the pandemic. He contributed about Rs. 100 million from the President's Fund. President also revealed that general public can delay the monthly electricity, water bills until 30 April.

The government has proposed plans to arrange home delivery of the essential goods to curb the coronavirus pandemic and also to control the crowd. The decision was reached by the government following the panic buying and overcrowding of public in shopping outlets and supermarkets on 23 March after the removal of curfew temporarily.

The government urged the main supermarkets of the country such as Cargills, Arpico Super Centre, Keells Super, Sathosa, and LAUGFS Holdings to sell products to customers via home delivery methods. PickMe offered services to deliver essential items such as gas and groceries. PickMe partnered with Lanka Sathosa to provide essential products to customers via home delivery channels, and also partnered with Litro Gas to provide gas cylinders. Sri Lanka's main apparel manufacturer Brandix offered one of its factories as a quarantine centre to assist government's fight against the coronavirus.

On 24 March, the government issued a statement that a special task force was established to effectively and efficiently regulate and conduct the distribution of essential commodities. The government designated Colombo, Gampaha, and Kalutara as high-risk zones. The Police DIG, Ajith Rohana, warned that there could be a possibility of more undisclosed unconfirmed hidden coronavirus cases due to the reluctance of carriers coming forward for testing and self-quarantine precautions.

The government extended the work-from-home period until 3 April due to the extension of indefinite curfews in high-risk zones. Rajapaksa ordered the Central Bank, commercial banks, insurance companies to continue services during the curfew.

Some reports revealed that Rajapaksa could arrange an emergency meeting at the parliament as soon as possible, which was dissolved earlier in the month for the parliamentary elections. He initially hosted an all-party press conference to curb the pandemic.

On 7 April Army, 1 Corps of Engineer Services (CES) turned the former Voice of America building complex at Iranawila, Chilaw, into an isolation hospital.

=== Politics ===
Rajapaksa condemned former UNP leader Ranil Wickremesinghe's remarks over the possibility of shortage of funds after 30 April, and criticized him for politicizing the current coronavirus pandemic. The ruling party also condemned the opposition's request to reconvene the dissolved parliament, and accused them of trying to seek political gains.

On 11 May 2020, the Sri Lankan government lifted the curfew that had been in place since the start of the pandemic, which allowed the public to return to work under the condition that social distancing is maintained. However, public gatherings, festivals, and celebrations were still banned. The government also allowed salons, beauty parlours, and barber shops to reopen on 11 May but strictly banned shaving. The government urged barbers to maintain precautionary health measures while cutting hair.

The 2020 Sri Lankan parliamentary election was held on 5 August 2020 during the pandemic. Voter turnout was initially low, primarily fueled by fears of contracting or spreading the virus, but slowly increased into the morning, however. Authorities required voters to wear face masks, along with the use of hand sanitizer when voters enter and leave polling stations.

=== Disposal of bodies ===

According to the authority guidelines, the bodies of deceased COVID-19 patients must be bagged and disinfected while the closest relatives are allowed to see the face of the deceased for a limited time within the hospital; touching the body is not allowed. Embalming is banned and funeral homes are expected to immediately bag the body and place it in a sealed coffin for religious rituals. Mass gatherings and funeral functions are banned and remains must be cremated within 24 hours of death.

Sri Lanka Muslim Congress leader Rauff Hakeem criticized the decision to make cremation mandatory, and claimed that cremations were done unlawfully without following either international rules or religious principles, and further stated that the cremation of a person should not be done without proper religious methods. The Muslim community gave mixed responses, with some criticising Hakeem while others criticised the government decision.

Some human rights activists and groups accused the government of not following WHO rules and regulations for cremations related to COVID-19 deaths.

A letter from the Ministry of Health in Sri Lanka was leaked to social media on 25 April 2020, which requested 1,000 body bags from the International Committee of the Red Cross to dispose of bodies during the ongoing coronavirus pandemic. The ministry later announced that it would investigate who leaked the letter to the media.

On 10 February 2021, following growing international criticism of the practice of forced cremations, Sri Lanka's prime minister Mahinda Rajapaksa indicated in Parliament that burials for COVID-19 victims would be allowed.

On 2 March 2021, Iranaitivu, 300 km (190 mi) from Colombo, was designated as the burial site for COVID-19 victims from Muslim and Christians who opposed cremations.

=== Philadelphia Missionary Church ===
On 21 March 2020, the authorities urged all the people who attended the Sunday service at Philadelphia Missionary Church, Jaffna, to self-quarantine for at least 14 days. On 15 March 2020, the main senior pastor of the church conducted special Sunday service, and was later found to have tested positive for COVID-19. He later went to Switzerland that day with his wife for medical treatment. The Northern Province governor, P. S. M. Charles, confirmed that the pastor hugged and blessed all worshippers during the service. Around 240 people were reported to have attended the service according to EconomyNext. Three of them were treated at the Jaffna Teaching Hospital.

=== Maligawatta stampede ===
On 21 May 2020, a stampede occurred near a Muslim Jumma residence in Maligawatta, Colombo, resulting in the death of three women and injuring nine. Although a businessman informed authorities about the charity event and received a police pass for it, the crowd gathered in huge unexpected numbers, which resulted in a stampede. Six suspects who were involved in relief distribution have been arrested mainly for conducting such an event amid coronavirus and for not maintaining proper hygienic measures and ignoring the ban on public gatherings.

=== Travel restrictions ===
The government banned the arrival of travellers from several European countries, including Spain, Norway, Switzerland, Belgium, Sweden, Germany, France, Austria, and the Netherlands, extending the ban to the United Kingdom on 15 March. The travel ban was also imposed to foreign travellers from India, South Korea, and Iran. SriLankan Airlines cancelled several scheduled flights from several countries, including India amid coronavirus fears. As of 17 March 2020, Sri Lankan government ordered travel restrictions to Canada, Bahrain, and Qatar. Aircraft were prevented from landing from 19 March until 25 March at BIA airport, except for cargo goods. The government also extended the validity of all foreigner visas until 12 April.

On 22 March, the government banned the arrival of all passenger ships and planes.

In December, Sri Lanka said travel restrictions would be relaxed from 26 March to allow expatriates and foreign passport holders to return without prior registration with the Foreign Ministry if they had booked paid quarantine. Restrictions were reinforced on 21 December after a highly transmissible SARS-Cov-2 strain was found in the UK and some other countries.

=== Arrests and legal actions ===
On 16 March 2020, four Sri Lankans who evaded quarantine after returning from South Korea were arrested by the Sri Lankan police while hiding in their homes. Legal action was taken against a 45-year-old patient who knew his travel partner to Germany was infected and did not admit himself for treatment. He later tested himself at a private hospital despite a ban on private testing by the government. He admitted himself to the IDH after carrying the virus for three days.

On 20 March, the mayor of Dambulla Jaliya Opatha and another person were arrested by police after the mayor organised a bicycle race despite the ban on gatherings. 20 people were taken into custody by the Sri Lanka Navy in Kochchikade and Puttalam coasts after attempting to go out after curfew, and a court case was filed against the COVID-19 patient that admitted himself to Ragama Hospital for chest pains while hiding his travel history, which resulted in the quarantine of hospital staff.

As of 15 May, more than 55,000 people were arrested for breaching the curfew imposed by the government. Some people have been arrested for allegedly spreading false information about the COVID-19 pandemic.

=== First wave curfews and lockdowns ===
On 18 March, the Sri Lanka Police imposed an emergency curfew in Puttalam, Negombo, Kochikade, and Chilaw, as 800 returnees from Italy were speculated to have visited those areas, before being officially confirmed by Silva. On 19 March, an emergency curfew was enforced from 10 p.m. in some area until further notice after the discovery of a new COVID-19 case in Ja-Ela.

On 20 March, Rajapaksa announced that a lockdown would be enforced on the entire nation from 6 p.m. on 20 March to 6 a.m. on 24 March to contain the pandemic. The lockdown was originally supposed to last from 20 to 23 March, but it was extended an extra day due to a surge in new cases. The government announced that the curfew would be lifted from most parts of the country from 23 March except Colombo, Gampaha, Jaffna, Kilinochi, and Mulaitivu to encourage the rural public to engage in retail purchases.

On 23 March, the government announced that it would impose the quarantine curfew from 12pm on 24 March until 27 March to contain the spreading of coronavirus, and they banned citizens from inter-district travel from 24 to 27 March. On 24 March, the government imposed a curfew for very high risk zones such as Colombo, Gampaha, and Kalutara for a maximum period of two weeks. On 28 March, government extended curfew for Jaffna district and Kandy district.

On 9 April, the government announced a curfew in the Ratnapura and Pelmadulla police divisions in the Ratnapura District. On 13 April, two villages, Panvila and Cheena Koratuwa in Beruwala, were isolated due to the threat of COVID-19. On 16 April, Bandaranaike Mawatha in Hultsdorf was completely closed down after a resident who had returned from India tested positive for COVID-19 and symptoms were detected after 33 days. On the same day, Nagalgam Street in Grandpass was also declared an isolated area until further notice.

On 22 April, 12 villages in the Lankapura division of Polonnaruwa were declared isolated areas after the first patient from the Polonnaruwa district was identified. On 24 April, Uhana and Damana in the Ampara district temporarily declared lockdown by Welisara Navy camp personnel. On 28 April, Havelock Lane, Dabare Mawatha in Colombo 05, and Hete Watte in Torrington were declared isolated villages.

On 3 May, Panwila and China Fort areas in Beruwala and Akurana in Kandy were reopened. On 29 May, government mandated a curfew for Nuwara Eliya District from 29 to 31 May due to large assemblies on streets for Arumugam Thondaman's death.

=== International support ===
The Government of China extended their support to Sri Lanka by extending the concessionary loan of US$500 million in order to fight the disease. The US government also lent their support to combat the outbreak by donating essential supplies, such as nitrile gloves and heavy duty work gloves. The founder of the Alibaba Group, Jack Ma, announced his plans to help the Asian countries affected by the coronavirus, including Sri Lanka, by providing essential emergency supplies such as masks and test kits. On 7 April, the Government of India donated 10 tonnes of essential medicines. The donation was given in good faith to Sri Lanka for its voluntary contribution to the SAARC COVID-19 Emergency Fund.

=== Criticisms regarding Big Match ===
Health authorities ordered self-isolation for 14 days for people who attended the annual Big Match, the cricket match held between S. Thomas' College Mount Lavinia and Royal College Colombo, which is also popularly known as the Battle of the Blues. The warning was raised after an alumnus S. Thomas College was infected with the coronavirus after attending the match. Officials warned that there was a possibility of the virus being spread to the crowd mainly including the old boys of their respective schools who gathered in large numbers. Rajapaksa urged the organisers to cancel the Big Match, but they ignored him and proceeded with the match. Several companies and businesses ordered their employees who attended the Big Match to not report to work for 14 days.

=== Criticisms regarding general public ===
Former Sri Lankan cricketer Mahela Jayawardene criticised members of the public who stayed in long queues in the supermarket without maintaining social distancing and did not wear face masks on social media.

The supermarket chains in the country made arrangements to control panic buying and long queues.

=== Research and development ===
The Pandemic. Research and Development Unit of Sri Lanka Navy developed a remote-controlled smart appliance called Medi Mate to allow healthcare workers to maintain distance from patients during testing and treatment. It is wheeled and remote-controlled, which allows workers to communicate with patients, transport medicine and meals, and spray disinfectants through an automated nozzle. The research and development unit of the Sri Lanka Navy developed a disinfection chamber and variants with added features that were placed in Kalubowila Teaching Hospital, Neville Fernando Teaching Hospital, and University Hospital KDU.

Vega Innovations, a subsidiary of CodeGen Group of Companies, collaborated with the Ministry of Health to design a low-cost Volume Controlled – Continuous Mandatory Ventilation (VC-CMV) Medical Ventilator that could be produced for a cost under US$650 per unit.

Atlas Axillia, a subsidiary of the Hemas Group, developed the Automated Guided Vehicle (AGV) robot, which is able to carry food and medicine, perform basic medical check-ups such as checking temperatures, and allow doctors to monitor patients remotely and have conversations with them. The first prototype was gifted to Base Hospital Homagama.

Students from the faculty of engineering at the University of Peradeniya repaired and developed oxygen respiratory systems and ICU beds. The National Science Foundation of Sri Lanka allocated funding to combat the pandemic, and invited proposals from Sri Lankan scientists.

The Center for Research and Development of the Ministry of Defence developed an interactive remotely operated robotic platform called Dr. Robort, a disinfection corridor, and two mobile disinfection platforms. The ministry asked the private sector to collaborate to commercialise these inventions and begin large-scale manufacturing.

The Sri Lanka Institute of Nanotechnology (SLINTEC) collaborated with state institutions and private companies on multiple projects to deal with the pandemic. The sudden demand for nasopharyngeal swabs caused a shortage; the IDH was down to 30 swabs at one point. SLINTEC identified the materials required and studied the manufacturing process and available facilities, which were then transferred to Hi Fashion Ltd., who began producing swabs with Lady Ridgeway Hospital. The institute also developed low cost RT-LAMP kits to detect viral RNA.

=== MSC Magnifica ===
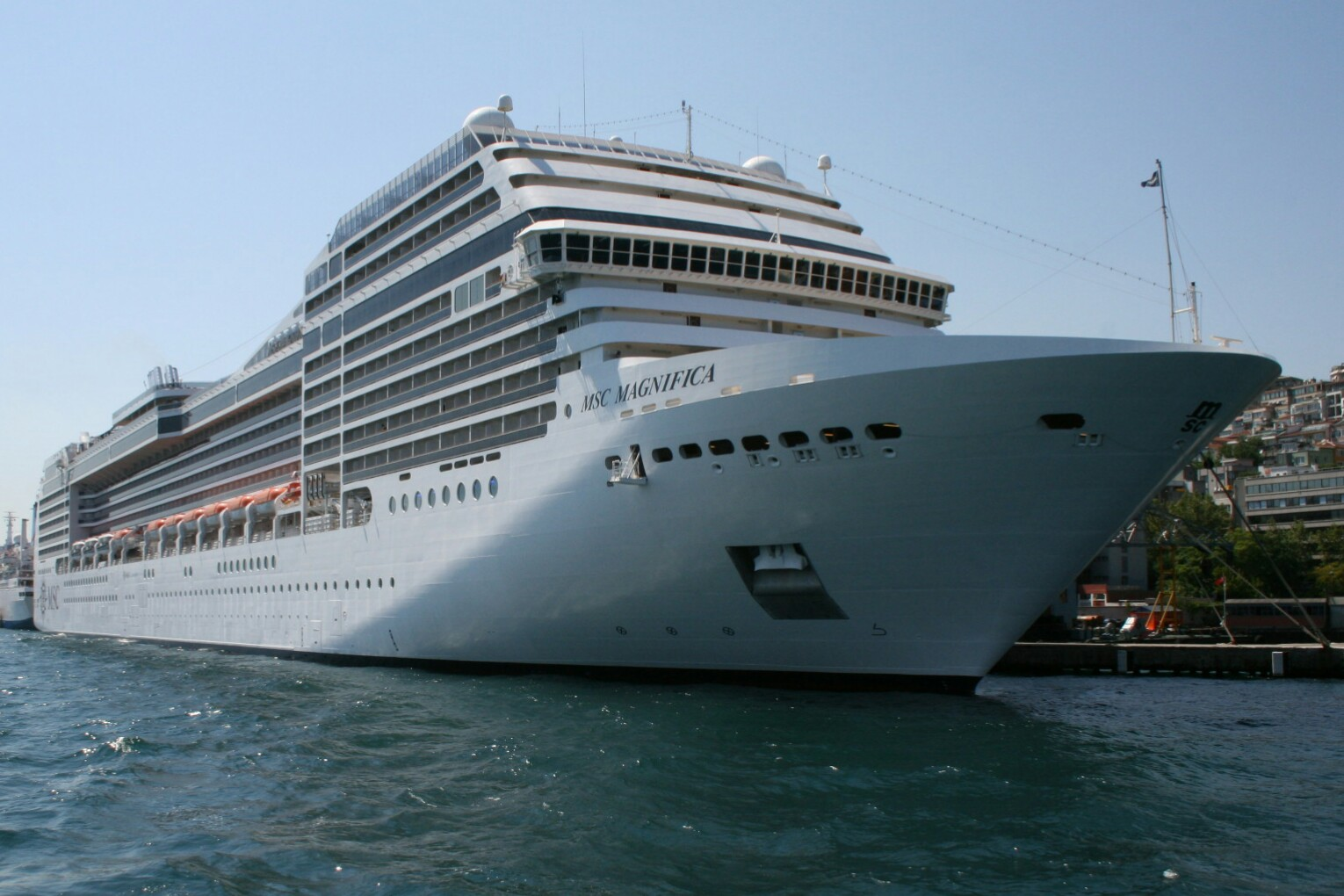
MSC Magniica's only Sri Lankan crew member on board and an ill passenger was disembarked when reached Colombo Harbour on her way back to Italy

A Sri Lankan chef on the MSC Magnifica, Anura Bandara Herath, made a request to the Sri Lankan government on social media to detain him when the cruise ship reached Colombo Harbour for resupplying on her way back to Italy. Rajapaksa responded to the request, and directed Vice Admiral Piyal De Silva to bring Herath ashore. Herath was directed to a quarantine centre in Boossa for 14 days of mandatory quarantine. A 75-year-old German female passenger also disembarked on a heart-related ailment and was admitted to the Sri Lanka National hospital. On 13 April, she died with complications.

=== False reports and rumours ===
On 12 March 2020, false reports spread on social media that the son of the 52-year-old tour guide who was infected with COVID-19 had also been infected. However, the allegations were refuted by the Ministry of Health, and the boy did not present with any symptoms were identified after thorough checking. The Sri Lankan Police told the general public to avoid being deceived by COVID-19 misinformation on social media platforms.

On 12, 13, and 14 March, the general public rushed into supermarkets and shopping centers due to panic buying. The Sri Lankan government insisted that the public not unnecessarily panic about the pandemic, and revealed that there was no shortage of essential items in the country, including petroleum and food. Sri Lanka Chamber of the Pharmaceutical Industry chairperson Kasturi Chellaraja Wilson revealed that there is no shortage of essential pharmaceutical products and drugs. There were rumours regarding the house-to-house quarantine in social media, but the government denied the allegations.

On 16 March, opposition MP Rajitha Senaratne made a controversial statement that ten school students had been infected with the virus while MP Sarath Fonseka claimed that there were three deaths due to disease. However, on 18 March, Fonseka admitted he quoted false information on Facebook. The police began an investigation of the two MPs.

Former Opposition Leader Sajith Premadasa promoted Plaquenil as a drug superior than hydroxychloroquine, though they are both the same drug. Due to its serious side effects, self-administration is not recommended. Premadasa also claimed azithromycin could treat the side effects of hydroxychloroquine, though it is an antibiotic and is not used to treat side effects. Premadasa later apologised for spreading misinformation.

Dhammika Bandara was a mason who became a self-proclaimed sorcerer and claimed that Kali gave him a recipe for a cure. He managed to gain the support of several politicians, including the Health Minister Pavithra Wanniarachi. After being prevented from giving the alleged cure to Jaya Sri Maha Bodhi, Bandara acted as if he was possessed by Kali and shouted "I am Kali. I am your mother" at the Buddhist monk in charge. Many doctors and researchers criticised Bandara, and Ayurvedic doctors expressed concern at the fact Bandara claimed to be an "indigenous doctor" without any credentials. Pavithra and another minister who ingested Bandara's alleged cure contracted COVID-19. Wanniarachi ordered the alleged cure to be investigated, and results showed that the potion was completely useless; no patients given the syrup showed any improvement over those without it. Bandara refused to stop production, claiming that as it was spiritual it could not be tested and it would lose its healing properties if the patient ate Maldives fish.

The University of Ruhuna issued a warning about a company called MeGha Primal that fraudulently used the name of the Karapitiya hospital and the university to sell a supplement it claimed cures COVID-19. The company also fraudulently claimed to have ISO certification. Facebook, YouTube, and Instagram quickly deleted MeGha Primal'spages.

=== Prison riots ===
On 21 March, a protest was held by prison inmates in Anuradhapura to separate themselves from each other after four reported cases were announced. Shots were fired in the protest, resulting in the death of two prisoners, leaving another six injured.

On 29 November, a riot at Mahara prison outside Colombo left eight people dead and over 50 injured. The riots occurred following the rumours and speculations regarding the transferring of COVID-19-infected prisoners to Mahara Prison from other crowded prisons. The prison inmates demanded that officials and authorities increase PCR testing following a surge in COVID-19 cases in Sri Lankan prisons.

=== "Nagitimu Sri Lanka" ===
A song titled "Nagitumu Sri Lanka" was released by the Gammadda initiative as a part of the MTV/MBC network to pay tribute to the people of the country to rise up again by showing resilience against the COVID-19 pandemic.

== Impact ==
=== Elections ===
On 19 March 2020, Election Commissioner Mahinda Deshapriya revealed that the 2020 Sri Lankan parliamentary election would be postponed indefinitely due to the pandemic. The Sri Lankan government initially insisted that the election would proceed as planned on 25 April despite the pandemic, and the authorities banned election rallies and meetings. On 3 April Sri Lanka's Election Commission wrote to Rajapaksa to seek court opinion on a delay of the elections, stating that they would not be complete before 1 June per the president's Gazette notification. P. B. Jayasundera, secretary to the president, wrote that the commission failed to act in provision of section 24 of the Parliamentary Elections Act of Sri Lanka, and asked them to hold the elections, which created a debate between the office of the president and the elections commission.

On 19 April, Rajapaksa announced that the Elections Commission had no authority to postpone general elections without providing an alternate date. The day after, the commission met in Colombo and announced 20 June as the new date despite increasing COVID-19 cases on the island. Almost all opposition parties raised concerns over how to hold campaigns with the ongoing curfew. Rajapaksa refused to recall the old parliament.

On 10 June, Deshapriya confirmed that the parliamentary elections would be held on 5 August 2020 with strict health measures and guidelines, joining countries such as Poland, South Korea, Singapore, Syria, and Serbia that have held elections during the COVID-19 pandemic.

=== Tourism ===
The coronavirus outbreak affected the decline of the country's tourism sector, which was recovering slowly from the impact of the 2019 Easter bombings. The tourism sector was directly affected by the decrease in Chinese tourists. The Sri Lankan government also suspended flights to mainland China and pilgrimages to India.

=== Environment ===
The air quality index showed a drastic improvement in air quality in highly dense areas such as Colombo since curfews were enforced.

=== Education ===
The government ordered schools to close for five weeks from 12 March to 20 April, which marked the end of the first term and also cancelled exams for the term. Private tutoring, including the Institute of Bankers of Sri Lanka, was also closed from 26 March. On 11 April, the government announced that the new school year was delayed until 11 May 2020.

The Sri Lankan government announced that it would reopen the schools from 29 June 2020 in four stages. Schools would be open to teachers to make arrangements that followed health guidelines from 29 June onwards, while students could return on 7 July. The GCE A/L examinations were postponed to 7 September and the scholarship exam 13 September.

On 6 July, grades 5, 11, and 13 at government schools resumed academic activities. However, on 12 July, due to a COVID-19 outbreak in Kandakadu, the government closed schools again from 13 to 17 July.

=== Government Examinations ===
Following the identification of a COVID-19 case from Gampaha, the Ministry of Education Sri Lanka announced on 5 October that all schools on the island would be closed indefinitely. The Commissioner General of Examinations announced that there is no change in the schedules of the Grade 5 and GCE Advanced Level Examination to be held in October. The department made arrangements to conduct the examinations on the dates notified in advance. Exam held on 10 October to 6 November. Education Minister G.L Peiris said that the examinations would be held while obeying health guidelines. On 10 October, Sri Lanka Railways published a special train timetable for providing transportation facilities to students sitting the Advanced Level and Grade Five Scholarship examinations.

=== Entertainment ===
The Sri Lankan government imposed a ban on public gatherings for two weeks amid COVID-19 fears, and mandated that permission should be received from police. Film theatres, national parks, zoological gardens and botanical gardens throughout the country were closed indefinitely. The Sri Lanka Planetarium shut down on 17 March.

=== Economy ===
The Colombo Stock Exchange closed at a new eight-year low. Stock market activity stopped for at least 30 minutes on 13 March. On 5 March 2020, the Central Bank of Sri Lanka (CBSL) released a monetary policy review, and the monetary authority decided to keep policy interest rates unchanged despite the COVID-19 outbreak (SDFR fixed at 6.5% and the SLFR fixed at 7.5%). On 16 March 2020, they revised the monetary policy review and cut policy rates by 25 basis points, and the statutory reserve ratio by 1 basis point due to the pandemic. The CBSL continued its expansionary monetary policy to enrich the economy. The CBSL governor, W. D. Lakshman, asked financial institutions to not panic. On 18 March, the Securities and Exchange Commission announced that the Colombo Stock Exchange would be closed until 19 March. The Colombo Stock Exchange reopened on 11 May.

The CBSL asked the banking sector to allow banking activities for at least two hours on 23 March, and the banks encouraged the general public to utilise electronic transactions instead of physical cash. Experts revealed that the country is likely to mark a record-low negative growth rate for the first time since 2001 due to the economic pressures caused by the pandemic. The Commercial Bank of Ceylon stated that it would help customers who were severely affected by the pandemic. Fishermen are one of the most severely affected groups, as the export prices of the fish mainly to the European Union have drastically reduced; they have been unable to sell 400 tonnes of newly-caught fish due to restrictions imposed by authorities.

In October 2021, the World Bank estimated that 500,000 people had fallen below the poverty line since the pandemic started. Inflation reached a record high of 11.1% in November 2021.

- As of 27 March 2020, the domestic Sri Lankan rupee depreciated against the US dollar to 191.99.
- As of 8 April, the domestic Sri Lankan rupee further depreciated against the US dollar to 200.47.
- Several mega companies in Sri Lanka, ranked as top companies in the island, announced that they would reduce their employees' salaries to 5% from 35%, including John Keells Holdings, SriLankan Airlines, and Brandix Lanka.
- On 21 April, the government ordered liquor stores to close down. Despite quarantine measures relaxing on 11 May, liquor shops remained closed.
- Sri Lanka's gross domestic product rate was predicted to fall to -6.7% by the end of 2020.

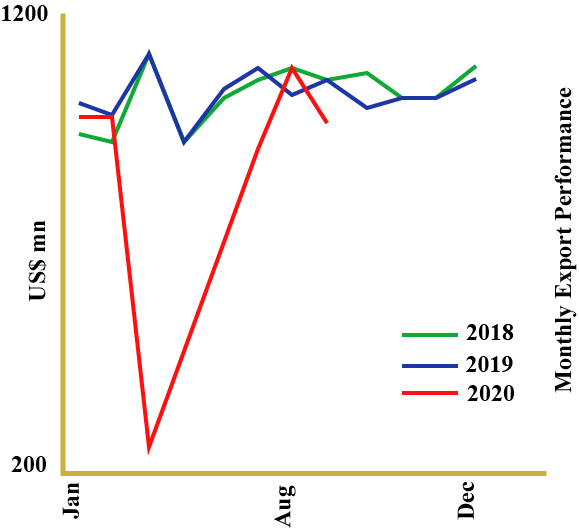
Monthly Export Performance 2018-2020

- In the second quarter of 2020, the Sri Lankan trade deficit decreased to US$3.8 billion from US$4.8 billion in 2019. Industrial exports shrank 10.2% (mostly garment goods), and the Sri Lanka rupee depreciated to 0.3% at the end of August.
- Sri Lanka's official reserves fell to US$6.6 billion in September 2020, with most reserve assets based on foreign currency reserves. The drop was attributed to the Middle East migrant workers' crisis.
- On 23 October, the Colombo stock market closed 0.05% lower than the previous day.

=== Religious services ===
On 15 March 2020, the Roman Catholic Archdiocese of Colombo, Malcolm Ranjith, held a televised church service to combat the pandemic. The archbishop announced that church service and holy masses in Colombo and Chilaw would not be conducted until 31 March 2020. The All Ceylon Jamiyyathul Ulama (ACJU) also asked that the Friday Jummah prayers in mosques be suspended.

Isolated incidents of mosques ignoring the curfew to hold gatherings and prayers were reported. In one incident in Horowpathana, 18 were arrested while several dozen fled the police. As a result, the ACJU suspended the board of trustees of the mosque in question, issued a statement praising the government, and requested action against those spreading hate speech due to the incidents.

Sunday mass services were cancelled for two weeks as of 14 April. Sri Lankan Buddhist monks started pirith chanting, a type of prayer to combat COVID-19 island-wide temples on a weekly basis.

=== Sports ===
The England and Wales Cricket Board (ECB) suggested English cricketers should not follow the tradition of handshaking during the two-match test series tour to Sri Lanka, which was scheduled to commence on 19 March 2020. The players were advised to bump fists as a precaution. The ECB also told English players to not take selfies or sign autographs with the crowd, and forbade them from interacting with fans. On 13 March, the cricket tour was called off, the first-class match in progress was immediately abandoned as a draw, and arrangements were made for the players to return to the UK. Both cricket boards planned to reschedule the matches. In December 2020, the ECB confirmed the dates for the tour, with both test matches played in Galle.

Domestic cricket matches were postponed indefinitely due to the pandemic. Sri Lanka Cricket (SLC) originally planned to conduct the matches until 16 March.

On 20 April, the cricket boards of Sri Lanka and South Africa confirmed that the South African cricket tour to Sri Lanka had been postponed due to the pandemic.

The three-match test series between Sri Lanka and Bangladesh, which was originally scheduled for July and August 2020, was postponed to October 2020 due to the COVID-19 pandemic. In September 2020, Sri Lanka Cricket initially recommended a one-week quarantine period for touring Bangladeshi players. However, SLC extended the quarantine period to 14 days, with the BCB disagreeing to the length of time their players should be quarantined and the lack of preparation time ahead of the first test match. In response, SLC suggested that the quarantine could be split into two phases: seven days in Bangladesh, and the remaining seven days in Sri Lanka. On 28 September 2020, the tour was postponed indefinitely as both boards could not decide on quarantine requirements for the series.

Indian women were scheduled to tour Sri Lanka in late November to play in five Women's One Day International and three Women's Twenty20 International matches. The dates for the series have not been confirmed due to pending quarantine guidelines for the Indian women's cricket team.

The inaugural edition of the Lanka Premier League was initially scheduled to be held in August 2020, and was later postponed to 14 November. However, the start of the tournament was delayed by one week (21 November) due to the compulsory 14-day quarantine process for foreign players as part of the health guidelines and precautions recommended by the health officials.

The auction styled player draft of the 2020 Lanka Premier League, which was scheduled to take place on 9 October, was rescheduled to 19 October 2020 by the Sri Lanka Cricket due to a surge in cases.

== Vaccination program ==
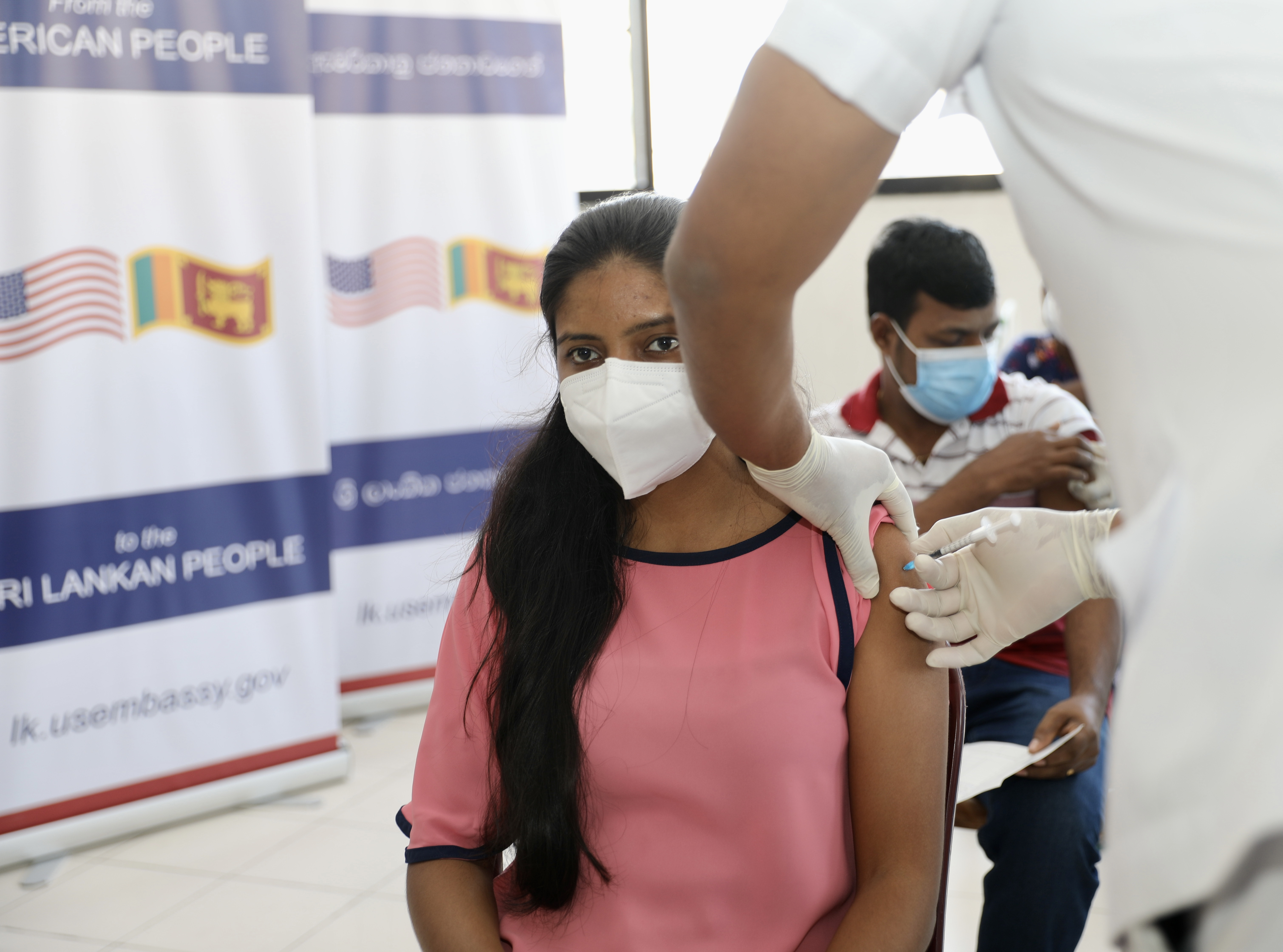
A Sri Lankan woman is vaccinated in 2021 as part of the COVAX initiative

A shipment of 500,000 doses of the Oxford–AstraZeneca COVID-19 vaccine, donated to Sri Lanka by the Indian government, arrived in the country on 28 January 2021.

In February, Rajapaksa instructed health authorities to vaccinate members of the general public in the Western Province with the vaccine. Members of Parliament were vaccinated starting 16 February.

Sri Lanka received 600,000 donated doses of the Sinopharm BIBP vaccine from China in March, and later purchased 3 million doses in May.

As of May 2021, Sri Lanka carried out its vaccination program with the Oxford–AstraZeneca, Sinopharm BIBP and Sputnik V vaccines. The nation ordered 5 million doses of the Pfizer–BioNTech vaccine, becoming the first South Asian nation to approve and order it.

== George Floyd protests ==
On 9 June 2020, Black Lives Matter protests were staged by activists, followers, and supporters of the Frontline Socialist Party in response to the murder of George Floyd in front of the US Embassy in Kollupitiya, Colombo. The protests became violent when police arrested approximately 20 people for violating health and quarantine regulations.

== Statistics ==
=== Charts ===
==== Confirmed new cases per day ====
View source data.

==== Confirmed deaths per day ====
View source data.

=== Number of COVID-19 deaths by age as of 31 December 2020 ===
View source data.

=== By region ===
COVID-19 District wise summary (15 December 2022)
Region		Total	
Provinces	Districts	Cases	Deaths
(Western Province, Sri Lanka) Western	Colombo	144,101	3,335
(Western Province, Sri Lanka) Western	Gampaha	115,716	3,135
(Western Province, Sri Lanka) Western	Kalutara	58,739	1,542
(Western Province, Sri Lanka) Western	Total	318,556	8,012
(Southern Province, Sri Lanka) Southern	Galle	45,867	895
(Southern Province, Sri Lanka) Southern	Matara	23,331	404
(Southern Province, Sri Lanka) Southern	Hambantota	20,208	237
(Southern Province, Sri Lanka) Southern	Total	89,406	1,537
(Central Province, Sri Lanka) Central	Kandy	22,469	835
(Central Province, Sri Lanka) Central	Matale	15,587	288
(Central Province, Sri Lanka) Central	Nuwara Eliya	12,342	329
(Central Province, Sri Lanka) Central	Total	50,398	1,452
(Northern Province, Sri Lanka) Northern	Jaffna	12,350	386
(Northern Province, Sri Lanka) Northern	Kilinochchi	10,027	71
(Northern Province, Sri Lanka) Northern	Mannar	2,529	31
(Northern Province, Sri Lanka) Northern	Mullaitivu	2,296	44
(Northern Province, Sri Lanka) Northern	Vavuniya	3,667	159
(Northern Province, Sri Lanka) Northern	Total	30,869	690
(North Western Province, Sri Lanka) North Western	Kurunegala	31,594	1,065
(North Western Province, Sri Lanka) North Western	Puttalam	15,390	383
(North Western Province, Sri Lanka) North Western	Total	46,984	1,448
(Sabaragamuwa Province) Sabaragamuwa	Kegalle	13,481	557
(Sabaragamuwa Province) Sabaragamuwa	Ratnapura	23,761	895
(Sabaragamuwa Province) Sabaragamuwa	Total	37,242	1,451
(Eastern Province, Sri Lanka) Eastern	Trincomalee	4,387	229
(Eastern Province, Sri Lanka) Eastern	Batticaloa	9,894	248
(Eastern Province, Sri Lanka) Eastern	Ampara	19,303	271
(Eastern Province, Sri Lanka) Eastern	Total	33,584	749
(North Central Province, Sri Lanka) North Central	Anuradhapura	15,100	469
(North Central Province, Sri Lanka) North Central	Polonnaruwa	5,269	258
(North Central Province, Sri Lanka) North Central	Total	20,369	726
(Uva Province) Uva	Badulla	14,651	505
(Uva Province) Uva	Monaragala	15,315	243
(Uva Province) Uva	Total	29,966	749
Other		14,402	
Total		671,776	16,814

== See also ==
- COVID-19 pandemic by country
- COVID-19 pandemic in South Asia
