= Fake news coverage of Sri Lankan businesses after the 2019 Easter bombings =

Fake news coverage of the 2019 Easter bombings

Sri Lanka faced a spate of coordinated bombings in churches and hotels on Easter Sunday 2019. The country was earlier involved in a three-decade internal conflict between the State and the Liberation Tigers of Tamil Eelam – a proscribed terrorist organization – that ended in May 2009. The Easter attacks, the largest since the war, were carried out by extremist Islamists. The chaos surrounding the attacks was compounded by the viral spread of fake news aimed at the minority Muslim community in the country. This led to a state shutdown of social media to prevent anti-Muslim mobs from organizing in the aftermath of the attack. The government also decided to criminalize hate speech and fake news in June 2019 to prevent a reoccurrence of violence.

== Background ==
The bombs set off by Islamist militants on Easter Sunday 2019 caused widespread panic fueled by fake news and misinformation about the security situation, specifically targeting the Muslim minority in Sri Lanka. The government reacted by blocking access to social media channels which they claimed were being used by mobs to coordinate reciprocal attacks on vulnerable communities, and to spread hate speech. In the aftermath of the bombings, the origin of the perpetrators caused a general sense of unease amongst others, with regards to the Muslim community. Attempts to counter such sentiments were made by the Muslim clergy, leadership, businesses, and community, including unequivocal support for police investigations. This situation was also taken advantage of by divisive figures seeking to further political agendas by aggravating the ground situation.

== Anti-Muslim sentiment after the attacks ==
In the aftermath of the bombings, anti-Muslim riots were carried out by some elements, with mobs taking to the streets in different parts of the country, attacking Muslims. Households and businesses were attacked and destroyed in several areas, resulting in one death in Kottaramulla and the destruction of Sri Lanka's largest pasta factory in Minuwangoda. The government imposed curfews and deployed the army to quell the violence, amid criticism enough was not done to prevent these reciprocal attacks.

== Fake news targets businesses ==
Coordinated social media and trade-level fake news campaigns by ultranationalist elements also targeted Muslim-owned businesses in the aftermath of the attacks. Hundreds of fake profiles, pages, and content to spread fake news were created, all claiming Muslim business funding for terrorists and calling for the boycott of Muslim businesses and their products. The malicious posts also urged the majority of Sinhala consumers to patronise only "Sinhala" businesses. Customers were prevented from buying from Muslim businesses with Social Media posts recording an instance of a Buddhist monk chasing customers out of a (Muslim-owned) shop and threatening that its owners would not sell to non-Muslims. Fake news aimed at Sri Lankan businesses goes back to the year 2012 when the ultranationalist movement, Bodu Bala Sena first spread hate speech against minorities and Muslim-linked businesses in Sri Lanka.

The post-Easter 2019 fake news campaigns singled out several large businesses deemed to be owned by Muslims, including local ride-hailing company PickMe and corporate giants such as Hemas Holdings. Businesses that had invested in Halal Certificates, especially sought by Muslim consumers, were also targeted. Social media and instant messengers were used to spread targeted false rumours purported to be about such entities. This took place even as the Government shut down social media to stem the spread of fake news, created and shared to induce action by the masses.

Social media trends show that hate speech was already a prominent topic on platforms, even prior to the attack. However, it was post-Easter Attacks that the volume of fake news especially targeting Muslim-linked businesses increased exponentially.

PickMe, a ride-hailing app, was targeted with claims that it funded terrorist organisations in Sri Lanka and was biased against non-Muslim stakeholders. Fake posts with doctored images – since deleted or taken down – were created and circulated on social media stating "PickMe owner is an ISIS-funder". Other Muslim businesses were wrongly accused of plotting against the Sinhala race, repeating an allegation first made in 2012.

Stationery company Atlas Axillia – which was earlier acquired by publicly listed Hemas Holdings – also came under severe attack. Similar to the PickMe issue, fake news was spread online on the Atlas Axillia acquisition, saying that Muslims were buying over Sinhala businesses and using profits to fund terrorists. According to the company, there were reports of teachers warning students to not bring Atlas products into classrooms, merchants being threatened for stocking Atlas products, and the company being labelled a "Muslim company that shouldn't be given business" despite being owned by a publicly listed conglomerate.

== Companies respond to fake news ==
In a press conference, PickMe Chairman Ajit Gunewardene revealed that images manipulated to mislead the public in fake news campaigns were originally from an unrelated event in the UK. Joining other business leaders, he condemned the fake news campaign that was being carried out against companies.

"Our Board of Directors represents our shareholders and consists of Ajit Gunewardene as Chairman, Conrad Dias (representing LOLC PLC.), Dinesh Rodrigo (representing Interblocks Ltd.), Ruchi Gunewardene (Managing Director - Brand Finance Lanka) and Zulfer Jiffry who is the CEO of the company, managing its day to day operations." Ajit Gunewardene, Chairman, PickMe in a statement to the media on 30th April 2019

Atlas Axilia's Managing Director, Asitha Samaraweera convened the media to raise awareness on the impact fake news was having on the business and even customers. He alleged that students using Atlas stationery in schools were being discriminated against and in many cases ridiculed for their choice of product.

"This is truly a pathetic situation and very disheartening. This hate campaign, at the end of the day, is having a much larger impact on the minds of our little children; the young minds are being corrupted for petty short-term financial gains." Asitha Samaraweera, Managing Director, Atlas Axilia, at a media conference on 3rd July 2019

== Condemnation and consequences ==
The anti-Muslim misinformation campaign was denounced by national business chambers and professional associations including the Bar Association of Sri Lanka, which called for legislation to be introduced to crack down on parties involved in hate speech and generating fake news. Prominent members of the government also called for stern action to be taken against persons and companies attempting to use the 2019 Easter Bombings for personal and commercial gain.

International organisations and watchdogs condemned the spread of inciteful fake news in Sri Lanka and Facebook took action against fake profiles, groups, and pages engaging in spreading misinformation. Facebook representatives met with Sri Lankan authorities to cooperate on enforcing stricter moderation on the platform to stem hate speech against Muslims.

In June 2019, the Cabinet of Ministers approved an amendment to the Penal Code and Criminal Procedure Code to include the spreading of hate speech and fake news as offences punishable by law.
