= Anusha Siriratne =

Sri Lankan aviator

- Education: Holy Family Convent, Bambalapitiya
- Occupation: pilot
- Known for: Sri Lanka's first female pilot captain
- Spouse: Hemantha Siriratne

Anusha Siriratne is a Sri Lankan female aviator and served as one of the prominent pilots in SriLankan Airlines. She is the first Sri Lankan female captain of the national carrier and also led the first all-female crew in the history of SriLankan Airlines. Her husband Hemantha Siriratne is also a pilot, and the duo became the first husband-wife combination to work as captains at SriLankan Airlines.

== Education ==
She completed her secondary education at the Holy Family Convent in Bambalapitiya.

== Career ==
She had a brief stint with the Sky Cabs as an instructor before joining the SriLankan Airlines as a full-time pilot. Anusha obtained her private pilot's license at CDE Aviation, and received her commercial pilot's license in Texas. She became a cadet pilot in 1998 and served as a second officer on the Lockheed L1001 Tristar fleet. She was promoted to the position of first officer in 1991.

She was officially appointed as captain of SriLankan Airlines and became the first female to achieve the feat. She also led the first all-female crew on a flight from Colombo to Trichy on 1 November 2009.

== See also ==
- List of Sri Lankan aviators
