= Sybil Wettasinghe =

Sri Lankan writer (1927–2020)

- සිබිල් වෙත්තසිංහ
- Born: 31 October 1927; Galle, Sri Lanka
- Died: 1 July 2020 (aged 92); Sri Jayawardenepura General Hospital
- Resting place: Borella Cemetery
- Education: Holy Family Convent, Bambalapitiya
- Occupations: Writer (Sinhala), Author in Sri Lanka
- Years active: 1944–2020
- Spouse: Don Dharmapala Wettasinghe (m.1955 d.1988)
- Children: 4

Kala Keerthi Sybil Wettasinghe (Sinhala: සිබිල් වෙත්තසිංහ) (31 October 1927 – 1 July 2020) was a children's book writer and an illustrator in Sri Lanka. Considered as the doyen of children's literature in Sri Lanka, Wettasinghe has produced more than 200 children's books which have been translated into several languages. Two of her best known works are "Child In Me" and "Eternally Yours".

== Personal life ==
Sybil Wettasinghe was born on 31 October 1927, the second of five siblings. She spent the first six years of her childhood in the village of Gintota in suburban Galle, where she started the primary education from Ginthota Buddhist School (currently as Ginthota Madya Maha Vidyalaya). Her family then moved to Colombo where she entered the Holy Family Convent, Bambalapitiya at the age of 6. Her grandfather was a sculptor. Her father was a building contractor and mother was an artist with lace-making.

In 1955, she married Don Dharmapala Wettasinghe, the Chief Editor of Lakehouse News; the couple had four children and five grandchildren.

== Early career ==
In 1942, her father sent some drawings by Sybil to an exhibition at the Art Gallery. The Headmaster of Royal Primary, Mr H. D. Sugathapala, saw them and asked her to illustrate his ‘Nava Maga Standard 5 Reader’. Aged 17, Wettasinghe joined Lankadeepa newspaper. In 1952, Wettasinghe moved to the much-coveted Lakehouse publications where she became the main illustrator of the Janatha newspaper and became the first Sri Lankan woman to work full-time as a journalist. Her entry into Lake House gave access to an entire network of newspapers and she wrote and illustrated for the Sunday Observer, Silumina, Daily News and Sarasaviya.

Sybil Wettasinghe is one of the most popular children's book authors in the twentieth century in Lanka and in a number of other countries. Given her own style of magical illustrations and simple but intriguing plotting of stories, Sybil had been a unique treasure Sri Lanka has gifted to the children of the world. Her works remain to be the most read by Sri Lankan children.

In an interview with Minoli Rathnayaka on Etv for ‘Power Women’ program, Sybil thankfully mentions her father's influence in her early life which shaped her up for a career as an illustrator and a children's book author. Her father, Sauderis, as it was, had encouraged Sybil to pursue a career of an artist against her mother's wish for her to become an architect. It was her father who decides to move to the capital providing Sybil better opportunities in education. When she was 15, he takes measures to display some of her pictures at Colombo Art Gallery, which lead to the beginning of her professional career. In that, having seen her works at the art gallery Mr. Sugatapala offers Sybil the opportunity to illustrate for a book he and his wife were compiling.

Martin Wicramasingha, the legendary Sri Lankan author, had recognized Sybils's potential in her earliest works and had predicted a bright future ahead. At the age of 17 (1944), she starts working for a local newspaper as an illustrator where Sybil was the only fulltime woman employee. Referring back to the experience working in a predominantly male dominant working environment, Sybil claims that she was greatly supported and encouraged by her coworkers; especially, renowned characters such as W.A. De Silva (author), Manawasinghe (poet) and Sunil Shantha (composer/singer).

When she started working for Lakehouse Publications, she meets her future husband Mr. Don Dharmapala Wettasinghe, the chief sub-editor of the newspaper at the time. According to Sybil, Mr. Wettasinghe had been a great critique, guide and an admirer of her work. It was on his request that Sybil starts writing children's stories to go with her own illustrations. In her first attempt, she ends up producing her most popular work, "Kuda Hora" (Umbrella Thief). Sybil admires her husband as the person behind all her great achievements. He had protected Sybil while giving her surprising extent of freedom to follow her dreams. For instance, although he was in politics, Wettasinghe never got his wife involved in it. However, at the age of twenty-four, when she got invited for a five-week training program in Burma he persuades her to attend it despite the facts that she was pregnant and will not be accompanied by him.

Sybil has viewed children's mischievousness as an essential facet of a healthy mind, of which, the adults should be tolerant. She reckoned that being playful/mischievous is a child's right and unsubtle governing brings about harm. Suuttara Puncha, the protagonist of a series of stories she created, represents those qualities Sybil believed that every child essentially possessed. Humor, according to her, is the most important essence in children's stories. Through Suuttara Puncha's adventures Sybil claims that she intended to provide amusement for children and advise for adults. She believed that a child lives in every adult and that Suuttara Puncha's adventures were so popular among adults because they addressed that inner child.

Sybil had received over 200 overseas awards and a number of local awards, among which the highest (Kala Keerthi) award a Sri Lankan is given for work in the field of arts. However, above all the honors she received she adore the love of her children fans. Sybil always valued children's imagination. Among her published books there are some stories told by 3–4 year olds. For example, "Rathu Car Podda", a story about a red little toy-car who was scared to sleep outside the house, and, was comforted by ‘Uncle Mango Tree’. Sybil also had illustrated for important series of books: to educate children of child abuse, children's bible, children's Dhammapadaya (an important guide in Buddhist doctrine).

Sybil was a devoted Buddhist throughout her life and gifted with the nature of being content with what she gets. She had only one good eye (the other completely blind) from birth. It is remarkable that she was able to create such magnificent illustrations despite her defected eyesight. Her life story alone is an inspiration to children as well as to adults.

== Author works ==
In 1952, while working at the Janatha newspaper, Wettasinghe made her first attempt to write stories. She produced a narrative called Kuda Hora for the children's page of the newspaper in 1952. This story eventually developed into a book that won critical acclaim both locally and internationally. Inspired by the success of Kuda Hora, Wettasinghe applied herself to writing as well as illustrating and proceeded to produce over 200 children's books over the course of her career.

Many of her works have been translated into languages such as Japanese, Chinese, Swedish, Norwegian, Danish, English, Korean, Dutch and Tamil.

Year	Book	Languages
1994	Hoity the Fox	Japanese, Korean, Swedish, Norwegian, Chinese, Sinhala and English
1970	Little Granny	Tamil, Sinhala and English
2009	Poddi and Podda	Japanese and Sinhala
1986	Thambaya Takes a Ride	Sinhala, Tamil & English
1960	Sooththara Puncha	Sinhala
1999	Run away Beard	Sinhala, Japanese, Tamil and English
1994	Strange Visitors to the Cat Country	Japanese, English, Tamil and Sinhala
1965	Wesak Lantern	English, Tamil and Sinhala
2009	Eternally Yours	English, Sinhala and Tamil
2009	Dura Gamanak	Sinhala
2000	Little Red Car	English, Sinhala and Tamil
2010	Monster in the Well	English and Sinhala
1995	Child in Me	Dutch, English, Sinhala, Tamil and recently in Japanese
1970	Magul Gedara Bath Natho	Sinhala
1956	The Umbrella Thief	Japanese, Chinese, Swedish, Norwegian, Danish, English, Korean, Sinhala and Tamil

== Awards ==
During her career, Wettasinghe has won much international acclaim and her children's stories secured awards both in Europe and Asia. In 1965, her story 'Vesak Lantern' won an Isabel Hutton Prize for Asian Women writers for Children. Her first book 'Kuda Hora' was chosen for the Best Foreign Book Award in Japan in 1986 and in 1987 it won the Japanese Library Association Award as the most popular children's book. 'Kuda Hora' book was translated into seven languages (English, Norwegian, Danish, Japanese, Chinese, Korean and Swedish). Wettasinghe has held exhibitions of her work in Japan and Czechoslovakia and in 2003, she was invited to Norway for a book festival for well-known authors. Internationally her work has received high acclaim and attention, in particular for its distinctly vernacular themes and styles.

On 6 March 2020, Wettasinghe's name was entered into Guinness Book of World Records for the book with the most number of alternate endings. It was shared with schools in all three languages. The book Wonder Crystal received a total of 20,000 endings from children all over Sri Lanka, out of which the 1200 best entries were featured in a printed version to coincide with World Children's Day.

- For "The Wesak Lantern" : State Literary Award for best English Children's book in year 1996.
- For "The Child in Me" : The Gratiaen Prize for most Creative English book in year 1995.
- Prize for illustrations of "Deeptha Lama Maga", awarded by Biennial of Illustrations in Bratislava (BIB).
- State Literary Award for "Magul Gedara Bath Natho" book in year 1971.
- Best Children's Picture Book award for "The Umbrella Thief" by Ministry of Cultural Affairs of Japan, in year 1986.
- Most popular Children's Book award by International Library of Children's Literature, in year 1987.
- Award for Illustrations of the Sinhala Children's Bible "Deeptha Lama Maga" in year 1989, presented by Biennial of Illustration Bratislava.
- Best Juvenile Children's Book Award for "Meti Gedara Lamay" by the Arts Council of Sri Lanka in year 1992.
- Best English Children's Book award for "Wooley Ball" by the Arts Council of Sri Lanka in year 1994.
- Gratiaen Prize for best English Children's Book for "The Child in Me" in year 1995.
- Hoity the Fox – by the Ministry of Culture and Social Welfare Japan, in year 1995.
- "Vishwa Prasadini" Award for Art and Children's Literature presented by the 1st Female Prime Minister of Sri Lanka Hon. Sirimavo Bandaranaike, in year 1996.
- Award of "Rohana Pradeepa" from the University of Ruhuna in year 2003.
- "Galu Pahansilu" – from the Young Men's Buddhist Association Galle, in year 2004.
- Kala Keerthi award presented by the Democratic Socialist Republic of Sri Lanka, in year 2005.
- "Solis Mendis Award" in year 2007.
- For "Dura Gamanak" The State literary awards
- Nikkei Asia Prize for Culture for 2012

== Death ==
Wettasinghe had been receiving medical treatment for her ailments at a private hospital in Colombo since 27 June 2020. She died on 1 July 2020 at the age of 92 while receiving treatment at Sri Jayawardenapura General Hospital. Her remains were laid briefly at her residence at Dias Place in Pepiliyana Road, Nugegoda. Her funeral took place on 3 July 2020 at Borella Cemetery.

== See also ==
- Sybil Wettasinghe,1995, Child in Me, Colombo: Published by Author
- Anoli Perera, 2008,“Women Artists in Sri Lanka: Are they the Carriers of the Women's Burden?", South Asia Journal for Culture, Vol. 2. Pitakotte: Colombo Institute/ Theertha.
