= Lanka Sathosa =

Retail and wholesale chain in Sri Lanka

Lanka Sathosa Limited
- Company type: retail chain, state owned company
- Industry: Retail, Wholesale
- Founded: 2005; 21 years ago
- Defunct: September 30, 2023
- Successor: Sathosa
- Headquarters: Slave Island, Colombo-02, Sri Lanka
- Number of locations: 441+ (2023)
- Area served: Sri Lanka
- Key people: Samitha Perera - Chairman S S Senawatte - Chief Executive Officer
- Products: Supermarket; Hypermarket; Superstore
- Brands: LSL
- Revenue: ▼ Rs. 5.5 billion Per month
- Owners: Ministry of Trade, Commerce and Food Security
- Number of employees: 4,000+ (2023)
- Website: www.lankasathosa.org(People's) www.lankasathosa.lk(Government)

Lanka Sathosa also known as Sathosa is a wholesale and retail chain located in Sri Lanka. It is considered to be the largest state-owned retail chain in the country and was established in 2005. Sathosa was incorporated as a state-owned enterprise under Companies Act no 7 of 2007 and it is regulated by the Ministry of Trade, Commerce & Food Security. The main function of Lanka Sathosa Limited is to set prices of many essential items in the domestic retail market.

Pasanda Yapa Abeywardena was appointed as the chairman of Lanka Sathosa in August 2022. As of 2023, the retail chain expanded its branch of network beyond 441. Lanka Sathosa has also guaranteed to sell essential items at concessionary prices during tough times including the coronavirus pandemic in the country.

== Controversies ==
Johnston Fernando was arrested on 5 May 2015 in relation to the non-payment for goods worth more than 5 million rupees but was released on bail amounting to Rs. 25,000 and three sureties worth Rs. 2.5 million each. He is also being investigated on financial irregularities connected to Sathosa during his tenure as the Cooperatives and Internal Trade Minister.

On 5 June 2019, the All-Island Canteen Owners' Association Chairman (AICOA) complained that Rishad Bathiudeen abused the Consumer Affairs Authority (CAA) to mistreat Sinhalese businessmen and also distributed food commodities unfit for human consumption through Lanka Sathosa.
