= Visakha Wijeyeratne =

Sri Lankan artist and social worker

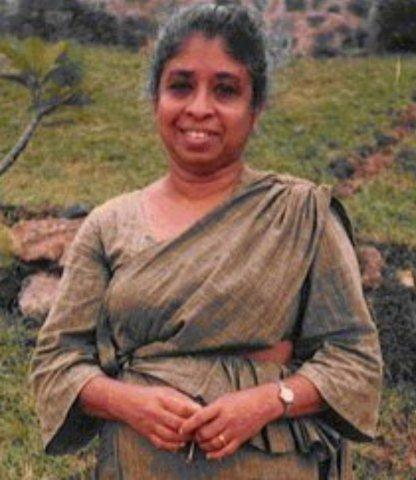
- Born: Visakha Bulankulame; March 17, 1935; Colombo
- Died: 13 April 1999 (aged 64); Kandy
- Spouse: Tissa Wijeyeratne
- Children: Kalpana, Ravana

Visakha Wijeyeratne (Sinhala: විශාකා විජයරත්න, née Bulankulame) (17 March 1935 – 13 April 1999) was a Sri Lankan artist, painter, sculptor, writer and social worker. Her husband, Tissa Wijeyeratne, was a politician, diplomat, barrister and businessman.

== Early days ==
Visakha Wijeyeratne was born at Sirimedura, Horton Place Colombo 7 to Dr Edmund Ashoka Bulankulame and Ivy Dunuwille Senenayake. She was the fourth in a family of seven and spent her childhood in Anuradhapura.

== Education ==
She schooled at Holy Family Convent, Bambalapitiya and Newstead Girls College, Negombo. Her post-secondary education was in Agriculture, Farming, Art History, Art and Foreign Languages. She followed these areas of study and practice over a period of seven years at the Farm School for girls in Kundasale, the Heywood Institute of Art, at the Alliance Francaise, Goethe Institute and at the Russian Cultural Centre.

== Artistic career ==
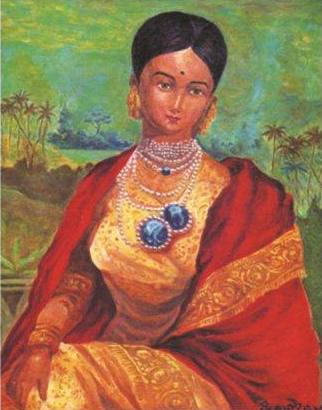
Rangamma - The last Queen of Kandy Painting by Visakha Wijeyeratne

Wijeyeratne's artistic style was post-impressionistic in oil on canvas, using primarily a yellow ochre base colour and building up layers.

In the 1960s, she learnt embroidery whilst living in St. Gallen, Switzerland. When she came back to Sri Lanka, she started to revive Sinhala embroidery, teaching others. Her inspiration was a book by Ananda Coomaraswamy, Medieval Sinhalese Art. This work provided employment for village women.

Wijeyeratne continued to paint, but had to change to using styles which art buyers preferred. She made copies of works including the 1815 portrait of Rangamma, a consort of Sri Vikrama Rajasinha of Kandy. She was commissioned in 1981 to paint President Junius Richard Jayewardene.

She spent four years in Paris as the wife of the Sri Lankan ambassador, and sold work during that time. Those who bought her work included politicians Helmut Schmidt and Jeremy Thorpe, and Devi Sukarno of Indonesia.

== Social and charitable work ==
Wijeyeratne carried out social work as part of the Inner Wheel Club of Kandy, affiliated to Rotary International.

== Family ==
Tissa and Visakha Wijeyeratne had two children.
