= Tissa Wijeyeratne =

Sri Lankan politician

Tissa Wijeyeratne තිස්ස විජේරත්න
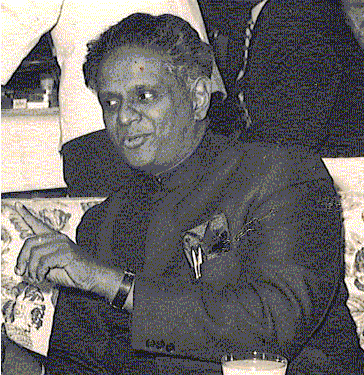

Sri Lankan Ambassador to UNESCO, France and Switzerland
- In office 1970–1974

Personal details
- Born: 17 February 1923
- Died: 11 July 2002 (aged 79)
- Party: Communist Party of Sri Lanka, Sri Lanka Freedom Party
- Spouse(s): Visakha Wijeyeratne (née Bulankulame)
- Children: Kalpana, Ravana
- Education: Royal College, Colombo; Inner Temple
- Occupation: Politics, diplomat, businessman
- Profession: Lawyer

Suratissa Diyasena Wijeyeratne (Sinhala: සුරතිස්ස දියසේන විජයරත්න) (17 February 1923 – 11 July 2002) (known as Tissa Wijeyeratne) was a Sri Lankan politician, diplomat, barrister and businessman. He was also Additional Secretary to the Ministry of External Affairs and Defence, and Senior Advisor (Foreign Affairs) to the Prime Minister.

== Early life ==
Tissa Wijeyeratne was born 17 February 1923 to a leading family from Sabaragamuwa in Sri Lanka. He was the eldest son of Sir Edwin and Lady Leela Wijeyeratne, of Buddenipola Walauwa, Kegalle. Sir Edwin Wijeyeratne was a former Cabinet Minister of Home Affairs and Rural Development. Tissa Wijeyeratne had two younger brothers, Nissanka and Cuda Wijeyeratne. Nissanka Wijeyeratne was a politician, civil servant, diplomat and Diyawadana Nilame. Dr. Cuda Wijeyeratne is a consultant psychiatrist.

== Education ==
Wijeyeratne completed his primary and secondary education at the Royal College, Colombo. Wijeyeratne left school in 1941 and pursued further studies in Switzerland before studying Law in London and then he was admitted of the Inner Temple in 1945.

== Legal career ==
Wijeyeratne was called to the Bar in 1959 and became a Barrister-at-Law in 1960. He returned to Sri Lanka a year later and started a practice as a lawyer in Kegalle. His forte was Criminal Law. Soon he became one of the most successful lawyers in the Sabaragamuwa and Central Province. Wijeyeratne was instrumental in obtaining rights for Sri Lankan lawyers to wear the national dress to courts. He was the first lawyer since Sri Lanka's independence to appear in courts attired in the national dress of Sri Lanka.

== Political career ==
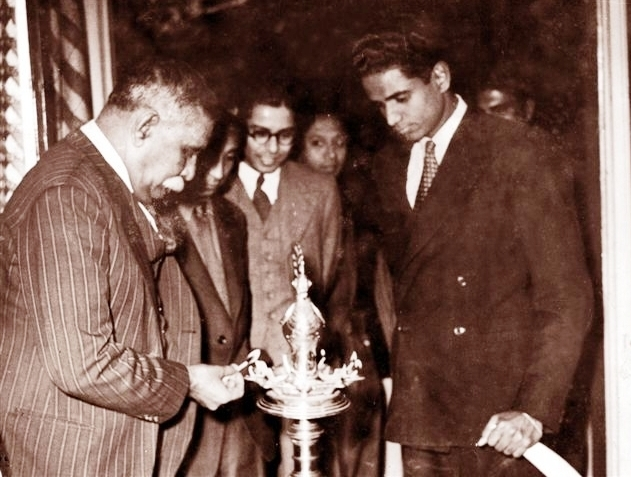
Tissa Wijeyeratne with Prime Minister D.S Senanayake

As a student, Wijeyeratne was a committed Marxist and student activist. He was President, Ceylon Students Union in London and later joined the international student movement. In 1951, he led the first Ceylon delegation to the World Festival of Youth in Moscow. During this time, he became a member of the British Communist Party.

He returned to Sri Lanka in 1956 before completing his Barristers examinations, and became a full-time activist of the Communist Party of Sri Lanka. He subsequently became the party's Chief Organiser for the Kegalle Electorate. During the late 1950s and 1960s, he maintained close links with the university community at Peradeniya, visiting the university on several occasions to deliver political lectures. In the General Elections 1960 (March) he contested Kegalle Electorate from the Communist Party but was defeated. Tissa Wijeyeratne later joined the Sri Lanka Freedom Party. He was an active member of the party from 1965 onwards, but did not contest the 1970 parliamentary election.

== Diplomatic career ==
In the 1970s, Wijeyeratne was appointed Sri Lankan ambassador to the UNESCO, France, and Switzerland. As Ambassador, he strengthened Sri Lanka's diplomatic and trade relations, particularly with European countries and promoted tourism and traditional Sri Lankan exports while maintaining close links with these countries.

== Foreign Affairs career ==
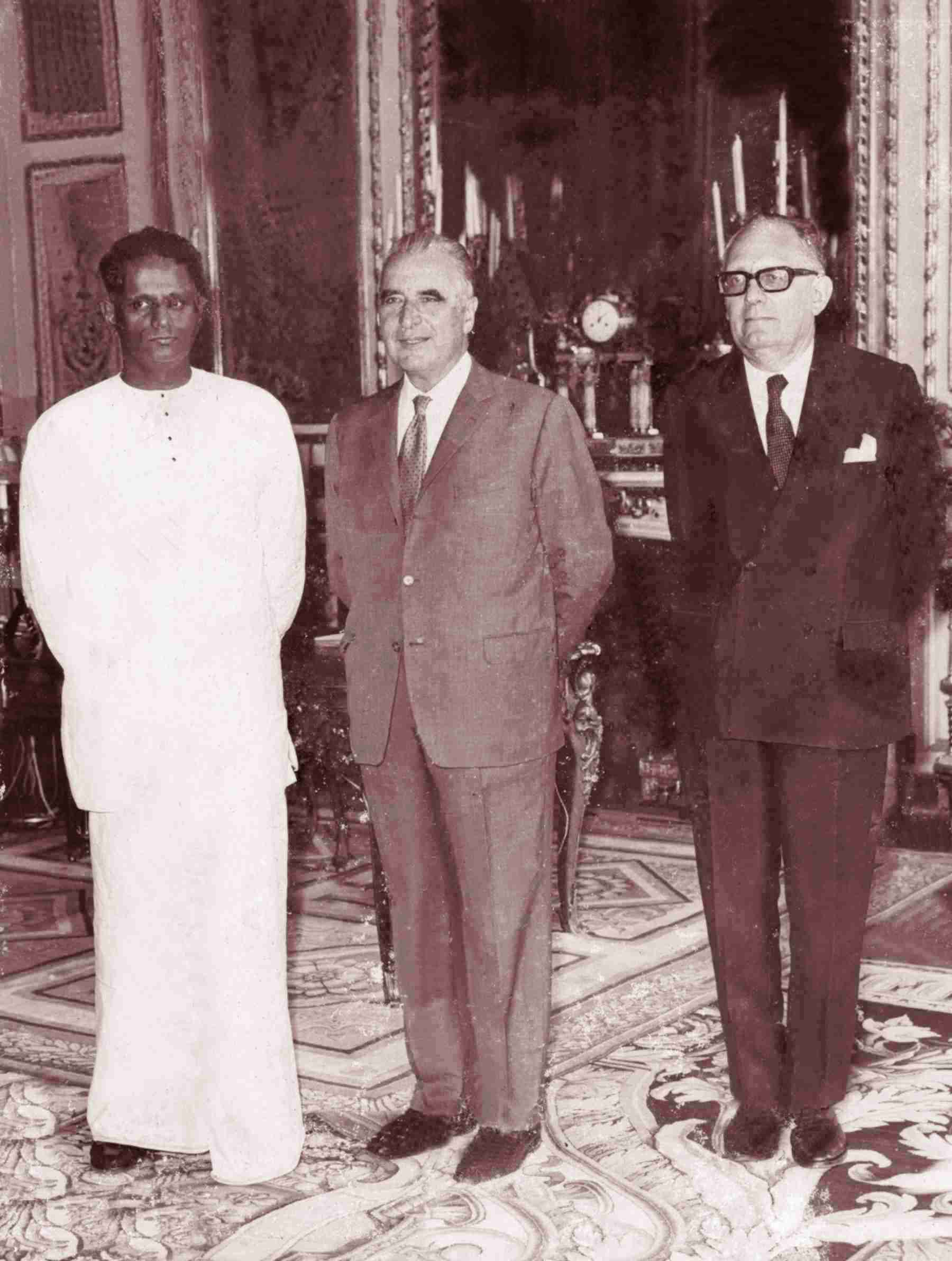
Tissa Wijeyeratne with Georges Pompidou French President (center) and Maurice Schumann French Foreign Minister (right)

Tissa Wijeyeratne returned from France in 1974 and was appointed the Additional Secretary to the Ministry of External Affairs and Defence and Senior Advisor (Foreign Affairs) to the Prime Minister, where he was largely responsible for foreign affairs. He was also one of the main organisers of the 1976 Non-aligned Summit in Sri Lanka. During this time, he expressed strong public opinion for the formation of a separate Foreign Ministry in Sri Lanka. This was later implemented by President J.R Jayawardena.

As Additional Secretary, Wijeyeratne placed strong emphasis on the Sri Lankan national identity within the foreign service. To implement re-organisation of the Sri Lanka Foreign Service to this effect, he consulted representatives from several public service trade unions so that the foreign service represented the views of the people. He brought a Sinhalese and Tamil oriented dimension to the Foreign Office, recruiting locally educated youth to nurture Sri Lanka's identity in missions abroad. He also proposed the initiation of a Diploma course in Diplomacy at an institute of foreign affairs that would be affiliated with the University of Sri Lanka, providing training opportunities to hopeful diplomats. His proposal was materialised in 1975 as the Bandaranaike Institute of Foreign Studies. Wijeyeratne left the foreign service in 1976 and returned to the Kegalle Bar.

== Finance ==
During the late 1970s, Tissa Wijeyeratne being a firm believer in uplifting the life of rural communities in Sri Lanka, ventured into finance. His deep belief in the economic philosophy of British economist E. F. Schumacher lent the company its motto "Small is Beautiful". He grouped together influential businessmen in the city of Kandy amidst a group of influential lawyers and embarked on his final career. Thus in 1978, he formed what is today Sinhaputhra Finance Ltd, a Central Bank Registered Finance Company, of which he was the founder chairman. The company commenced business in 1979 under the name of Sinhaputhra Agricultural and Industrial Finance Ltd. and focused initially on providing vehicles to rural areas for the transport of their produce to markets. He also became an active member of the Finance Houses Association of Sri Lanka, and was part of an active team that spearheaded the enactment of useful legislation. During his tenure, he also helped promote the establishment of the Sri Lanka Institute of Credit Management to strengthen the industry.

== Family ==
Wijeyeratne married Visakha Bulankulame, a well known Sri Lankan artist. She was the daughter of Dr Edmond Asoka Bulankulame and Ivy Senanayake Bulankulame of Nuwarawewa Walauwa, Anuradhapura. Tissa and Visakha Wijeyeratne had one daughter, Kalpana and a son, Ravana, who is the current managing director of Sinhaputra Finance PLC, and the current Honorary Consul for France in Kandy.

== See also ==
- List of political families in Sri Lanka
- Sri Lankan Non Career Diplomats
