= Holy Family Convent, Bambalapitiya =

Holy Family Convent, Bambalapitiya ශුද්ධ වූ පවුලේ කන්‍යාරාමය, බම්බලපිටිය

Location
- Retreat Road, Colombo; Sri Lanka; 6.887979°N 79.856803°E

Information
- Type: Semi Government
- Motto: French: Gloire a Dieu seul (Glory to God Alone)
- Religious affiliation: Christianity
- Denomination: Roman Catholic
- Established: 3 February 1903; 123 years ago
- Principal: Rev. Sr. Charitha Thandalage
- Grades: 1 – 13
- Gender: Female
- Age: 5 to 19
- Houses: Suzanne; Sebastian; Ambrose; Rose De Lima; Carmel
- Colors: Blue and white
- Publication: Refreshing Breezes
- Alumni name: Familians
- Website: hfcb.lk

Holy Family Convent, Bambalapitiya is a Catholic girls' school in Colombo, Sri Lanka. It was established on 3 February 1903 by the nuns of the Holy Family Order of Bordeaux.

It provides primary and secondary education. The school has around 3,500 students. It is a non-fee levying school. School buildings include a fully-equipped auditorium, ICT lab, Science lab, Chapel, and Library.

== History ==
The first principal was Rev. Mother Agnes Stouter. The school's chapel was completed in 1933. The school began as a small school for thirty students at "Clock House" down Laurie's Road. After shifting location several times, the school ended up where it is now, down Retreat Road. During World War 2, the school building was used as a hospital.

Holy Family Convent Bambalapitiya celebrated its 110th anniversary on 2 February 2013.

== Chapel ==
The chapel of Holy Family Convent, Bambalapitiya, was dedicated to the Holy Family of Nazareth in 1933. Funds to build it were collected through various sources. Concerts were organised, and each class came forward to perform every Friday, for which tickets were sold at the price of 10 cents.

The Carrara marble altar was a gift from the past pupils of that time, and the tabernacle was a gift from Elizabeth Pillai. Holy Hour every first Friday afternoon of the month, annual retreats that went on for two or three days, and confessions on Thursdays were the regular religious services that were held in the chapel.

== Anthem ==
The college anthem was composed by Eileen Walles and the words written by Wendy Whatmore.

== Facilities ==
- Auditorium
- ICT labs
- Dancing halls
- Large conference hall named "Green Hall"
- Home economics room
- Library
- Multimedia rooms
- Primary Hall
- Primary play area
- Science lab
- Students' saving unit powered by HNB

== Notable alumni ==
- Maureen Hingert - Actress; beauty pageant winner, 1955
- Dinakshie Priyasad - Actress
- Sheshadri Priyasad - Actress
- Anusha Siriratne - Aviator
- Bernard Soysa, politician
- Sybil Wettasinghe, children's author and illustrator
- Visakha Wijeyeratne, artist
- Kasturi Chellaraja Wilson, businesswoman and athlete
