= PickMe Food =

Sri Lankan online food delivery platform

- Company type: Subsidiary
- Industry: Online food ordering
- Founded: 2018; 8 years ago
- Founders: Zulfer Hassen
- Headquarters: Nugegoda, Sri Lanka
- Area served: Sri Lanka
- Key people: Zulfer Hassen (CEO)
- Services: Food delivery
- Parent: PickMe
- Website: www.pickme.lk/food

PickMe Food is Sri Lankan online food delivery platform launched by PickMe in 2018. PickMe Food also provides on-demand grocery, essential medicines and package delivery service called PickMe Flash. PickMe Food rivals international Uber Eats and would make the industry a duopoly. Both companies major players in the online food delivery industry since 2020. In 2019, it expanded across Sri Lanka to Colombo, Kandy, Negombo, Gampaha, Kurunagala and Kaluthara. In 2019 PickMe Food acquired YAMU restaurant portal.

== Partnerships ==
PickMe Food has partnered with Pizza Hut, KFC, McDonalds, Barista, Subway and BreadTalk. In 2020, PickMe partnered with Microsoft improve the delivery of transport services.
