= Atlas Axillia =

Sri Lankan stationery company

Atlas Axillia Pvt Ltd formerly known as Ceylon Pencil Company (Pvt) Ltd is a Sri Lankan stationery company which falls under the purview of private limited company and sells products under its brand Atlas. It is also a subsidiary of the Hemas Holdings. Atlas Axillia supplies school and office stationery products such as notebooks, pens, pencils and colour products.

== Corporate history ==
The Ceylon Pencil Company (Pvt) Ltd was founded on 29 September 1959 by D. S. Madanayake, at a time when the industry was under the firm dominance of the imported products. The Ceylon Pencil Company was later renamed as Atlas Axillia. Atlas Axillia currently operates two production houses in Kerawalapitiya and Peliyagoda.

In July 2017, Atlas Axillia collaborated with Chinese stationery brand DELI as part of the company's long-term strategy planning of becoming a fast moving consumer good business. The flagship brand of the Atlas Axillia Company, Atlas was recognised for being the most loved brand in 2017 and the brand was conferred with the National Quality Award in 2018 by the Sri Lanka Standards Institution.

In 2018, Hemas Group acquired approximately 75.1% stake of the ownership in Atlas Axillia for 5.7 billion rupees as part of the synergy creation and differentiation strategies of the Hemas Group. It was revealed that the board of directors of Atlas Axillia were interested in partnering with Hemas Holdings by way of amalgamation process while also retaining 24.9% of the ownership of Atlas Axillia with the Madanayake family and the preexisting shareholders. Atlas Axillia eventually made a decision to establish a strategic alliance with Hemas Holdings in order to diversify and expand the international market operations. Despite the company's acquisition by a large conglomerate in the caliber of Hemas Holdings, Atlas Axillia continued to operate independently while being a subsidiary of Hemas Holdings.

In October 2019, coinciding with the International Children's Day, Atlas Axillia launched a special segment "Atlas Future Land" Mobile Activity Centre at the Colombo International Book Fair, to mark the occasion of the company's 60th anniversary since its inception.

In March 2020, Atlas Axillia developed a prototype Automated Guided Vehicle (AGV) robot model that had been incorporated with the salient feature of a home-grown robotic medical assistant. The company eventually donated the automated guided vehicle robot to hospitals during the peak of the COVID-19 pandemic in Sri Lanka for the medical professionals to treat the patients who were treated for the coronavirus disease.

In August 2024, Atlas Axillia ventured into the toy market and sensory play by launching educational toys catering to school children under the brand name PlayPalz as a part of company's child development strategies.

== Boycott ==
Atlas Axillia, along with other local Sri Lankan national companies, had been affected as a part of a targeted anti-Muslim boycott campaign that was initiated by perpetrators on social media platforms following the April 2019 Easter Sunday church and hotel bombings. Following the Easter attacks, Atlas Axillia's business activities took a massive dent as their revenue streams began to crumble due to the hate campaign targeting Muslim-owned businesses in Sri Lanka.

The boycott of Atlas stationery brands trended in social media platforms as a result of the circulation of fake news about the composition, ownership, and organizational structure of the Atlas Axillia Company by falsified claims about the company being predominantly occupied by Muslims. The extent of the boycott campaign had also reportedly spread among school students who were ridiculed and punished for using Atlas branded stationery items at schools for their educational purposes, and the schoolchildren were forced to find replacement stationery brands.
