= Philadelphia Missionary Church, Jaffna =

Philadelphia Church
- Location in Northern Province
- 09°39′33.90″N 80°03′24.60″E
- Location: Ariyalai, Jaffna
- Country: Sri Lanka
- Denomination: missionary
- Website: www.pmcinternational.ch

History
- Founder: Rev. Paul Satkunarajah

Architecture
- Functional status: Active

Philadelphia Missionary Church also simply known as Philadelphia Church is a missionary church located in Ariyalai, Jaffna, Sri Lanka. The church is located at No 724 Kandy Road, Ariyalai.

== Coronavirus pandemic ==
On 15 March 2020, the main senior pastor of the church conducted special Sunday service which was arranged to mitigate the global coronavirus pandemic. It was later reported that the pastor was tested positive for COVID-19 and went to Switzerland on that day itself with his wife for medical treatment. The pastor Rev. Paul Satkunarajah is also noticeably the founder of the missionary church and is believed to be the resident of Switzerland. The person is also believed to have been infected with the virus before coming to Sri Lanka.

The Northern Province Governor P. S. M. Charles confirmed that the pastor with the coronavirus symptoms hugged and blessed all worshippers during the service. Around 240 people were reported to have attended the service according to the EconomyNext. On 21 March 2020, the authorities urged all the people who attended the service to self quarantine themselves for at least 14 days.
