= Dompe Polling Division =

Dompe
- Polling Division
- Coordinates: 6.998439°N 80.091997°E
- Country: Sri Lanka
- Province: Western Province, Sri Lanka
- Electoral District: Gampaha Electoral District

Area
  - Total: 186.8 km^{2} (72.1 sq mi)

Population (2012)
  - Total: 154,005
  - Density: 824/km^{2} (2,130/sq mi)
- ISO 3166 code: EC-02K

The Dompe Polling Division is a Polling Division in the Gampaha Electoral District, in the Western Province, Sri Lanka.

== Presidential Election Results ==
=== Summary ===
The winner of Dompe has matched the final country result 5 out of 8 times. Hence, Dompe is a Weak Bellwether for Presidential Elections.

Year	Dompe	Gampaha Electoral District	MAE %	Sri Lanka	MAE %
2019	SLPP	SLPP	6.64%	SLPP	13.43%
2015	UPFA	NDF	8.75%	NDF	10.37%
2010	UPFA	UPFA	8.08%	UPFA	11.36%
2005	UPFA	UPFA	4.75%	UPFA	9.04%
1999	PA	PA	1.88%	PA	6.85%
1994	PA	PA	0.66%	PA	2.90%
1988	SLFP	SLFP	3.59%	UNP	6.52%
1982	SLFP	UNP	5.19%	UNP	6.96%
Matches/Mean MAE	5/8	7/8	4.94%	8/8	8.43%

=== 2019 Sri Lankan Presidential Election ===
Party	Dompe		Gampaha Electoral District		Sri Lanka	
Party	Votes	%	Votes	%	Votes	%
SLPP	67,754	66.92%	855,870	59.28%	6,924,255	52.25%
NDF	28,629	28.28%	494,671	34.26%	5,564,239	41.99%
NMPP	3,070	3.03%	61,760	4.28%	418,553	3.16%
Other Parties (with < 1%)	1,798	1.78%	31,499	2.18%	345,452	2.61%
Valid Votes	101,251	99.33%	1,443,800	98.92%	13,252,499	98.99%
Rejected Votes	684	0.67%	15,751	1.08%	135,452	1.01%
Total Polled	101,935	86.42%	1,459,551	83.31%	13,387,951	83.71%
Registered Electors	117,950		1,751,892		15,992,568	

=== 2015 Sri Lankan Presidential Election ===
Party	Dompe		Gampaha Electoral District		Sri Lanka	
Party	Votes	%	Votes	%	Votes	%
UPFA	54,714	58.29%	664,347	49.49%	5,768,090	47.58%
NDF	38,491	41.00%	669,007	49.83%	6,217,162	51.28%
Other Parties (with < 1%)	666	0.71%	9,142	0.68%	138,200	1.14%
Valid Votes	93,871	99.07%	1,342,496	98.92%	12,123,452	98.85%
Rejected Votes	878	0.93%	14,647	1.08%	140,925	1.15%
Total Polled	94,749	82.14%	1,357,143	80.77%	12,264,377	78.69%
Registered Electors	115,356		1,680,263		15,585,942	

=== 2010 Sri Lankan Presidential Election ===
Party	Dompe		Gampaha Electoral District		Sri Lanka	
Party	Votes	%	Votes	%	Votes	%
UPFA	56,758	69.79%	718,716	61.66%	6,015,934	57.88%
NDF	23,619	29.04%	434,506	37.28%	4,173,185	40.15%
Other Parties (with < 1%)	947	1.16%	12,426	1.07%	204,494	1.97%
Valid Votes	81,324	99.41%	1,165,648	99.24%	10,393,613	99.03%
Rejected Votes	484	0.59%	8,960	0.76%	101,838	0.97%
Total Polled	81,808	78.54%	1,174,608	78.03%	10,495,451	66.70%
Registered Electors	104,155		1,505,363		15,734,587	

=== 2005 Sri Lankan Presidential Election ===
Party	Dompe		Gampaha Electoral District		Sri Lanka	
Party	Votes	%	Votes	%	Votes	%
UPFA	45,849	59.50%	596,698	54.78%	4,887,152	50.29%
UNP	30,306	39.33%	481,764	44.23%	4,706,366	48.43%
Other Parties (with < 1%)	900	1.17%	10,815	0.99%	123,521	1.27%
Valid Votes	77,055	99.14%	1,089,277	98.94%	9,717,039	98.88%
Rejected Votes	669	0.86%	11,724	1.06%	109,869	1.12%
Total Polled	77,724	80.01%	1,101,001	79.17%	9,826,908	69.51%
Registered Electors	97,143		1,390,691		14,136,979	

=== 1999 Sri Lankan Presidential Election ===
Party	Dompe		Gampaha Electoral District		Sri Lanka	
Party	Votes	%	Votes	%	Votes	%
PA	39,214	58.61%	532,796	56.58%	4,312,157	51.12%
UNP	23,857	35.66%	353,969	37.59%	3,602,748	42.71%
JVP	2,794	4.18%	40,472	4.30%	343,927	4.08%
Other Parties (with < 1%)	1,042	1.56%	14,382	1.53%	176,679	2.09%
Valid Votes	66,907	98.41%	941,619	97.84%	8,435,754	97.69%
Rejected Votes	1,081	1.59%	20,768	2.16%	199,536	2.31%
Total Polled	67,988	77.93%	962,387	77.12%	8,635,290	72.17%
Registered Electors	87,240		1,247,860		11,965,536	

=== 1994 Sri Lankan Presidential Election ===
Party	Dompe		Gampaha Electoral District		Sri Lanka	
Party	Votes	%	Votes	%	Votes	%
PA	39,151	65.42%	550,654	64.74%	4,709,205	62.28%
UNP	19,920	33.28%	288,608	33.93%	2,715,283	35.91%
Other Parties (with < 1%)	779	1.30%	11,256	1.32%	137,040	1.81%
Valid Votes	59,850	98.57%	850,518	98.48%	7,561,526	98.03%
Rejected Votes	867	1.43%	13,137	1.52%	151,706	1.97%
Total Polled	60,717	75.50%	863,655	74.16%	7,713,232	69.12%
Registered Electors	80,415		1,164,625		11,158,880	

=== 1988 Sri Lankan Presidential Election ===
Party	Dompe		Gampaha Electoral District		Sri Lanka	
Party	Votes	%	Votes	%	Votes	%
SLFP	30,829	53.19%	355,553	48.83%	2,289,857	44.95%
UNP	26,155	45.13%	350,092	48.08%	2,569,199	50.43%
SLMP	976	1.68%	22,467	3.09%	235,701	4.63%
Valid Votes	57,960	99.13%	728,112	98.63%	5,094,754	98.24%
Rejected Votes	511	0.87%	10,108	1.37%	91,499	1.76%
Total Polled	58,471	80.16%	738,220	74.93%	5,186,256	55.87%
Registered Electors	72,945		985,206		9,283,143	

=== 1982 Sri Lankan Presidential Election ===
Party	Dompe		Gampaha Electoral District		Sri Lanka	
Party	Votes	%	Votes	%	Votes	%
SLFP	27,508	49.04%	301,808	43.31%	2,546,348	39.05%
UNP	26,573	47.38%	365,847	52.50%	3,450,815	52.93%
JVP	1,670	2.98%	23,701	3.40%	273,428	4.19%
Other Parties (with < 1%)	337	0.60%	5,491	0.79%	249,460	3.83%
Valid Votes	56,088	99.08%	696,847	99.15%	6,520,156	98.78%
Rejected Votes	519	0.92%	5,992	0.85%	80,470	1.22%
Total Polled	56,607	85.50%	702,839	82.70%	6,600,626	80.15%
Registered Electors	66,207		849,896		8,235,358	

== Parliamentary Election Results ==
=== Summary ===
The winner of Dompe has matched the final country result 5 out of 7 times. Hence, Dompe is a Weak Bellwether for Parliamentary Elections.

Year	Dompe	Gampaha Electoral District	MAE %	Sri Lanka	MAE %
2015	UPFA	UNP	6.27%	UNP	6.30%
2010	UPFA	UPFA	7.46%	UPFA	9.17%
2004	UPFA	UPFA	4.89%	UPFA	7.40%
2001	PA	UNP	3.23%	UNP	6.07%
2000	PA	PA	3.09%	PA	4.87%
1994	PA	PA	0.17%	PA	4.73%
1989	UNP	UNP	4.25%	UNP	4.89%
Matches/Mean MAE	5/7	7/7	4.20%	7/7	6.20%

=== 2020 Sri Lankan Parliamentary Election ===
Party	Dompe		Gampaha Electoral District		Sri Lanka	
Party	Votes	%	Votes	%	Votes	%
SLPFA	64,663	74.3%	807,896	65.76%	6,853,693	59.09%
SJB	15,749	18.1%	285,809	23.27%	2,771,984	23.9%
JJB	2,681	3.08%	61,833	5.03%	445,958	3.84%
UNP	1,207	1.39%	28,282	2.3%	249,435	2.15%
OPPP	1,065	1.22%	21,627	1.76%	67,766	0.58%
Other Parties (with < 1%)	1,641	1.91%	23,027	1.88%	1,160,093	10.44%
Valid Votes	87,006	72.47%	1,228,474	68.78%	11,598,936	71.32%
Rejected Votes	4,067	3.39%	75,509	4.23%	744,373	4.58%
Total Polled	91,073	75.86%	1,303,983	73.01%	12,343,309	75.89%
Registered Electors	120,061		1,785,964		16,263,885	

=== 2015 Sri Lankan Parliamentary Election ===
Party	Dompe		Gampaha Electoral District		Sri Lanka	
Party	Votes	%	Votes	%	Votes	%
UPFA	44,925	52.55%	549,958	44.96%	4,732,664	42.48%
UNP	35,390	41.40%	577,004	47.17%	5,098,916	45.77%
JVP	4,557	5.33%	87,880	7.18%	544,154	4.88%
Other Parties (with < 1%)	618	0.72%	8,332	0.68%	81,501	0.73%
Valid Votes	85,490	95.78%	1,223,174	95.51%	11,140,333	95.35%
Rejected Votes	3,717	4.16%	56,246	4.39%	516,926	4.42%
Total Polled	89,256	77.37%	1,280,647	78.21%	11,684,111	77.66%
Registered Electors	115,356		1,637,537		15,044,490	

=== 2010 Sri Lankan Parliamentary Election ===
Party	Dompe		Gampaha Electoral District		Sri Lanka	
Party	Votes	%	Votes	%	Votes	%
UPFA	46,356	71.96%	589,476	63.40%	4,846,388	60.38%
UNP	14,185	22.02%	266,523	28.67%	2,357,057	29.37%
DNA	3,709	5.76%	69,747	7.50%	441,251	5.50%
Other Parties (with < 1%)	166	0.26%	3,985	0.43%	19,003	0.24%
Valid Votes	64,416	94.79%	929,731	94.83%	8,026,322	96.03%
Rejected Votes	3,518	5.18%	50,234	5.12%	581,465	6.96%
Total Polled	67,957	65.25%	980,467	65.06%	8,358,246	59.29%
Registered Electors	104,155		1,506,969		14,097,690	

=== 2004 Sri Lankan Parliamentary Election ===
Party	Dompe		Gampaha Electoral District		Sri Lanka	
Party	Votes	%	Votes	%	Votes	%
UPFA	40,327	57.72%	509,963	51.52%	4,223,126	45.70%
UNP	23,111	33.08%	367,572	37.14%	3,486,792	37.73%
JHU	5,943	8.51%	102,516	10.36%	552,723	5.98%
Other Parties (with < 1%)	482	0.69%	9,691	0.98%	57,229	0.62%
Valid Votes	69,863	95.76%	989,742	95.96%	9,241,931	94.52%
Rejected Votes	3,073	4.21%	41,462	4.02%	534,452	5.47%
Total Polled	72,958	77.00%	1,031,464	77.72%	9,777,821	75.74%
Registered Electors	94,755		1,327,145		12,909,631	

=== 2001 Sri Lankan Parliamentary Election ===
Party	Dompe		Gampaha Electoral District		Sri Lanka	
Party	Votes	%	Votes	%	Votes	%
PA	33,199	47.17%	428,780	43.08%	3,330,815	37.19%
UNP	28,707	40.79%	437,289	43.94%	4,086,026	45.62%
JVP	7,558	10.74%	113,990	11.45%	815,353	9.10%
Other Parties (with < 1%)	911	1.29%	15,171	1.52%	137,826	1.54%
Valid Votes	70,375	96.48%	995,230	96.30%	8,955,844	94.77%
Rejected Votes	2,569	3.52%	38,187	3.70%	494,009	5.23%
Total Polled	72,944	79.75%	1,033,417	80.36%	9,449,878	76.03%
Registered Electors	91,467		1,285,973		12,428,762	

=== 2000 Sri Lankan Parliamentary Election ===
Party	Dompe		Gampaha Electoral District		Sri Lanka	
Party	Votes	%	Votes	%	Votes	%
PA	35,897	53.29%	470,018	48.87%	3,899,329	45.33%
UNP	25,053	37.19%	378,328	39.34%	3,451,765	40.12%
JVP	4,576	6.79%	73,110	7.60%	518,725	6.03%
SU	972	1.44%	20,297	2.11%	127,859	1.49%
Other Parties (with < 1%)	867	1.29%	19,956	2.08%	319,123	3.71%
Valid Votes	67,365	N/A	961,709	N/A	8,602,617	N/A

=== 1994 Sri Lankan Parliamentary Election ===
Party	Dompe		Gampaha Electoral District		Sri Lanka	
Party	Votes	%	Votes	%	Votes	%
PA	35,849	56.91%	509,030	56.79%	3,887,805	48.94%
UNP	26,552	42.15%	375,631	41.91%	3,498,370	44.04%
Other Parties (with < 1%)	589	0.94%	11,627	1.30%	90,078	1.13%
Valid Votes	62,990	96.43%	896,288	96.39%	7,943,688	95.20%
Rejected Votes	2,331	3.57%	33,553	3.61%	400,395	4.80%
Total Polled	65,321	81.23%	929,841	79.65%	8,344,095	74.75%
Registered Electors	80,415		1,167,469		11,163,064	

=== 1989 Sri Lankan Parliamentary Election ===
Party	Dompe		Gampaha Electoral District		Sri Lanka	
Party	Votes	%	Votes	%	Votes	%
UNP	27,777	50.76%	385,733	54.14%	2,838,005	50.71%
SLFP	25,746	47.05%	294,490	41.34%	1,785,369	31.90%
USA	857	1.57%	21,665	3.04%	141,983	2.54%
Other Parties (with < 1%)	345	0.63%	10,549	1.48%	67,723	1.21%
Valid Votes	54,725	95.80%	712,437	95.64%	5,596,468	93.87%
Rejected Votes	2,401	4.20%	32,497	4.36%	365,563	6.13%
Total Polled	57,126	80.17%	744,934	76.82%	5,962,031	63.60%
Registered Electors	71,255		969,658		9,374,164	

== Demographics ==
=== Ethnicity ===
The Dompe Polling Division has a Sinhalese majority (97.9%) . In comparison, the Gampaha Electoral District (which contains the Dompe Polling Division) has a Sinhalese majority (90.5%)

Ethnicity in Dompe
1. Sinhalese (97.9%)
2. Moor (1.50%)
3. Other (0.60%)

=== Religion ===
The Dompe Polling Division has a Buddhist majority (94.5%) . In comparison, the Gampaha Electoral District (which contains the Dompe Polling Division) has a Buddhist majority (71.3%) and a significant Roman Catholic population (19.5%)

Religion in Dompe
1. Buddhist (94.5%)
2. Roman Catholic (3.00%)
3. Muslim (1.60%)
4. Other (0.80%)
