= PickMe =

Sri Lankan ridesharing and delivery company

Digital Mobility Solutions Lanka Limited
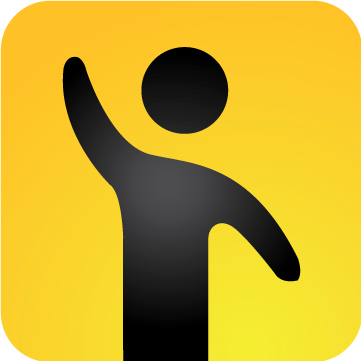
- Trade name: PickMe
- Company type: Public
- Traded as: CSE: PKME.N0000
- ISIN: LK0495N00008
- Industry: Technological Mobility Solutions provider
- Founded: March 2014; 11 years ago
- Founder: Zulfer Hassen
- Headquarters: Colombo, Sri Lanka
- Area served: Sri Lanka
- Key people: Ajith Gunewardene (Chairman); Zulfer Hassen (CEO)
- Products: PickMe Taxi Hailing App, PickMe Food
- Services: taxi hailing and delivery app
- Revenue: ▲LKR3,919 million (2024)
- Operating income: ▲LKR925 million (2024)
- Net income: ▲LKR679 million (2024)
- Total assets: ▲LKR2,821 million (2024)
- Total equity: ▲LKR1,749 million (2024)
- Owners: Zulfer Hassen (35.79%); International Finance Corporation (14.19%); Ajith Gunewardene (9.44%); LOLC Technologies Limited (9.33%)
- Number of employees: over 300 (2024)
- Website: pickme.lk

PickMe is a Sri Lankan taxi hailing and delivery app developed by Digital Mobility Solutions Lanka Ltd. It launched in June 2015. The app is available in English, Sinhala and Tamil on Android and iOS. By 2021 the company had 8000 registered users.

== History ==
PickMe was founded by entrepreneur Jiffry Zulfer in 2015. It was backed by the International Finance Corporation.

In September 2015, PickMe raised 150 million rupees in private funding. By June 2017, 6.5 million rides in total had been completed, with 35,000 rides happening daily, and the number of customers stood at around 620,000.

=== YAMU acquisition ===
PickMe acquired YAMU, a food and hotel review site, in July 2019. At the time YAMU had 325,000 monthly active users and 615,000 monthly pageviews.

=== COVID-19 response ===
During the COVID-19 pandemic in Sri Lanka, PickMe utilised innovations such as displaying the vaccination status of the driver, providing cash incentives for passengers riding to the nearest vaccination center, contact tracing, and installation of separators and hand sanitization facilities. PickMe's Flash delivery service was used by restaurants to deliver over 8200 orders during the lockdowns.

== IPO ==
The company announced its initial public offering on the Colombo Stock Exchange in September 2024. The company offered 13.04% of its shares and hoped to raise LKR1.5 billion. The IPO was held on 13 September 2024 and was oversubscribed on its opening day itself.

== Technology ==
PickMe's backend services utilise the microservices architecture, with over 100 microservices. It utilises Google Cloud Platform and Microsoft Azure, is deployed using Docker and Kubernetes, and uses Apache Kafka as a messaging service. The data science platform uses Apache Hadoop, Apache Spark, and Apache Hive. PickMe's micoservices are written in Go.

== See also ==
- List of companies listed on the Colombo Stock Exchange
