= Gothatuwa =

Gothatuwa ගොතටුව கொதட்டுவ
- Suburb
- Location within Colombo District Location within Sri Lanka
- Coordinates: 6°55′22.61″N 79°54′48.18″E
- Sri Lanka: Western Province
- District: Colombo
- Divisional Secretariat: Kolonnawa

Government
  - Pradeshiya Sabha: Kotikawatta Mulleriyawa
- Time zone: UTC+05:30 (SLST)

Gothatuwa (Sinhala: ගොතටුව, Tamil: கொதட்டுவ) is a suburb of Colombo in the Western Province of Sri Lanka. It is connected to the Sri Lankan transport network by Gothatuwa-Pettah Road and Kohilawatta-Kollupitiya Road. Gothatuwa is 9 km (5.6 mi) from the Colombo.

== See also ==
- List of towns in Western Province, Sri Lanka
