= Kasturi Chellaraja Wilson =

Sri Lankan activist and financial expert (born 1969)

- Born: 7 January 1969 (age 57); Colombo, Sri Lanka
- Education: Holy Family Convent, Bambalapitiya
- Occupations: Managing director, non-executive director
- Organization: Hemas Holdings PLC
- Known for: Group CEO of a public quoted conglomerate, president of the Sri Lanka Chamber of the Pharmaceutical Industry (SLCPI), captain of the National Basketball Team in 1989
- Spouse: Divorced

Kasturi Angela Chellaraja Wilson (born 7 January 1969) is a Sri Lankan businesswoman and the chief operating officer of 5hour International Corporation.

She holds positions as a non-executive director at Capital Alliance Holdings Limited and NDB Bank PLC and is on the board of the Ceylon Chambers of Commerce. She made history in 2020 as the first female group CEO of a listed conglomerate in Sri Lanka, following her appointment as group CEO of Hemas Holdings PLC.

Kasturi is a dual-sport national athlete, having represented Sri Lanka in both netball and basketball, and captained the National Basketball Team in 1989..

== Career ==
Kasturi Chellaraja
Personal information
- Born: 7 January 1969 (age 57)
- University: Institute of Management

Netball career
- Playing positions: C, GD
Years	National team	Caps
Medal record
Representing Sri Lanka
Asian Netball Championship
Silver medal – second place	1987 Kuala Lumpur	Netball
Gold medal – first place	1989 New Delhi	Netball
Bronze medal – third place	1993 Hong Kong	Netball
Gold medal – first place	1997 Singapore	Netball
Gold medal – first place	2001 Colombo	Netball

Kasturi is a former student of Holy Family Convent, Bambalapitiya. She was a member of the National Netball and Basketball Teams. Kasturi is a Fellow of the Chartered Institute of Management Accountants and an alumna of the Executive Leadership Program at Harvard Business School.

She began her career in 1988 as an audit trainee at Someswaran Jayewickreme & Co. (now Deloitte). She served as an audit manager and director before being appointed as financial controller at Aramex Airborne Lanka. For a short time, she was financial controller at Confifi Hotels. She joined Hemas Holdings PLC in 2002, as director of finance at HemTours and continued to hold many senior management positions, including chief processing officer and managing director of the Hemas Transportation Sector.

Her portfolio also included Hemas Aviation, Hemas Logistics and Hemas Maritime Services. In 2016, she was appointed as the managing director of Hemas Pharmaceuticals, Hemas Surgicals and Hemas Diagnostics and in 2020 she became the group CEO of Hemas Holdings PLC and became the first female group CEO of a public quoted conglomerate in Sri Lanka.

She is on the board of National Development Bank PLC and Capital Alliance Holdings Limited as a non-executive director and on the board of the Ceylon Chamber of Commerce. She was appointed as the Regional Champion for the World Bank for South Asia in April 2022 and UNICEF Sri Lanka Business Council (Child Rights and Business Principles) in April 2023.

She is the immediate past president of the Sri Lanka Chamber of the Pharmaceutical Industry and was the first female to be elected as president of the Sri Lanka Chamber of the Pharmaceutical Industry (SLCPI). She was a council member of the National Sports Council of Sri Lanka until March 2022. She has been on boards of Hemas Holdings, and several Hemas subsidiaries in the healthcare, consumer and mobility sectors, SLID ( Sri Lanka Institute of Directors ), CIMA Sri Lanka, Sri Lanka, the American Chamber of Commerce in Sri Lanka and Lankan Angels Network (LAN) – a leading start up eco system in Sri Lanka.

== Awards ==
In 2019, Kasturi was recognised as one of the twelve Top Women Change-Makers in the country by the Parliament of Sri Lanka and USAID. Kasturi was also the recipient of the Career Role Model Award in 2013 by Women in Management, Sri Lanka and the IFC, a World Bank Group. In 2016, she also won the Women Super Achiever Award at the World Women Leadership Congress Awards, India. She was also recognized as one of the ten ‘Wise Women’ impactful leaders of Sri Lanka by the Ministry of Skills and Vocational Education in 2022 and was named as the ‘Business Leader of the Year’ at the SAP Dare to Dream Awards in 2023.

== Personal life ==
Kasturi Chellaraja Wilson is a mother of two and has spoken openly about the challenges and rewards of balancing motherhood with a corporate career. She became a single mother at the age of 29, a turning point that led her to focus on building her career while raising her children.
