= Hemas Holdings =

Public limited conglomerate in Sri Lanka

Hemas Holdings PLC
- Type: Public
- Traded as: CSE: HHL.N0000
- ISIN: LK0337N00002
- Industry: Holding company; Healthcare; Consumer goods
- Founded: December 10, 1948; 77 years ago
- Founder: Sheikh Hassanally Esufally
- Headquarters: Colombo, Sri Lanka
- Key people: Husein Esufally (Chairman)
- Revenue: ▲LKR113.940 billion (2023)
- Operating income: ▲LKR10.963 billion (2023)
- Net income: ▲LKR5.068 billion (2023)
- Total assets: ▲LKR98.498 billion (2023)
- Total equity: ▲LKR39.120 billion (2023)
- Number of employees: ▼5,380 (2023)
- Subsidiaries: Hemas Hospitals
- Rating: Fitch: AAA(lka)
- Website: www.hemas.com

Hemas Holdings PLC is a diversified Sri Lankan corporation with a focused interest in consumer, healthcare, and mobility. Hemas is a publicly listed company with 5,380 employees. Hemas has also expanded operations to Bangladesh.

== Operations ==
Hemas Drugs (Ltd) was founded in 1948 by Sheikh Esufally for pharmaceuticals and chemicals and the compay would become a divserified group as it ventured into the manufacture of toiletries in the 1960s and then into travel and tourism in 1970. By 2003 healthcare sector was the largest component, but it had also expanded into consumer, transportation, leisure, apparel and development sectors. Hemas Holdings made its Initial Public Offering in 2003, listing 15 percent of the company to the public.

Hemas is a publicly quoted company listed on the Colombo Stock Exchange with over 4,000 shareholders.

On 25 June 2020, Kasturi Chellaraja Wilson was appointed as the CEO of Hemas Holdings and will replace Steven Enderby as the CEO with effect from 1 October 2020 as a part of the company's succession plan. Kasturi also became the first female group CEO of a public quoted conglomerate in Sri Lanka. She was also appointed as the deputy CEO of Hemas Holdings and will resume her duties as the deputy CEO with effect from 1 July 2020.

On 15 December 2020, Hemas announced they will sell Serendib Hotels to LOLC Group for LKR792 million.
