= Milanka Price Index =

The Milanka Price Index was one of the principal stock indices of the Colombo Stock Exchange in Sri Lanka till it was discontinued in January 2013 further to introduction of Standard & Poor's Sri Lanka 20 index. It was composed of a select group of 25 best performing stocks, a list which was reviewed each quarter, as opposed to the Colombo Stock Exchange's "All Share Price Index", which uses all of the ~250 stocks on the exchange to calculate an index value.

== Listings ==
As of January 2012, the 25 stocks on the Milanka Price Index, listed by sector, were as follows:

=== Banks, Finance & Insurance sector ===
Stock symbol	Company	Notes
	Commercial Bank of Ceylon	
	Central Finance Company	
	DFCC Bank	
	Hatton National Bank	
	Lanka Orix Leasing	
	Nations Trust Bank	
	Sampath Bank	
	LB Finance	
	Union Bank of Colombo	

=== Beverage, Food & Tobacco sector ===
Stock symbol	Company	Notes
	Distilleries Company of Sri Lanka	

=== Diversified sector ===
Stock symbol	Company	Notes
SPEN	Aitken Spence	holding company; leisure, transport, services, power, printing, plantations, apparel, property development
	Free Lanka Capital Holdings	
JKH	John Keells Holdings	holding company; FMCG, plantations, logistics, information technology, financial services, leisure
	Richard Pieris	rubber, tires, plastics, agriculture, transport, FMCG
	The Colombo Fort Land and Building Company	
	Vallibel One	
	Softlogic Holdings	

=== Manufacturing sector ===
Stock symbol	Company
	Ceylon Grain Elevators
	Piramal Glass Ceylon
	Royal Ceramics Lanka

=== Power & Energy ===
Stock symbol	Company
	Laugfs Gas

=== Healthcare sector ===
Stock symbol	Company	Notes
	Lanka Hospitals Corporation	

=== Land & Property sector ===
Stock symbol	Company	Notes
	Colombo Land and Development Company	

=== Investment Trusts ===
Stock symbol	Company
	Environmental Resources Investment

=== Trading ===
Stock symbol	Company
	Brown & Company

== See also ==
- List of South Asian stock exchanges
