= Sri Lanka Interbank Payment System =

Interbank payment system in Sri Lanka

Sri Lanka Interbank Payment System (SLIPS)
- Industry: Finance
- Headquarters: Colombo, Sri Lanka
- Products: Financial services
- Owner: LankaPay (Pvt) Ltd
- Website: www.lankapay.net

The Sri Lanka Interbank Payment System, commonly known as SLIPS, is a LKR-only online interbank payment and fund transfer system in Sri Lanka.

SLIPS is owned by LankaClear, an organization owned by the Central Bank of Sri Lanka and all Licensed Commercial Banks operating in Sri Lanka, with 47.19% of shares held by the CBSL and State owned commercial banks, and 52.81% by other private banks. SLIPS transfers are designed primarily for catering low-value payments up to LKR 5 million (equivalent to approximately US$15,500).

Sri Lanka Interbank Payments - Bank Branch List
Bank code	Bank name
7010	Bank of Ceylon
7038	Standard Chartered
7047	Citibank
7056	Commercial Bank
7074	Habib Bank Ltd
7083	Hatton National Bank
7092	HSBC
7108	Indian Bank
7117	Indian Overseas Bank
7135	People's Bank
7144	State Bank of India
7162	Nations Trust Bank
7205	Deutsche Bank
7214	National Development Bank
7269	MCB Bank Limited
7278	Sampath Bank
7287	Seylan Bank
7296	Public Bank
7302	Union Bank of Colombo
7311	Pan Asia Banking Corporation
7384	ICICI Bank
7454	DFCC Vardhana Bank
7463	Amana Bank
7472	Axis Bank
7481	Cargills Bank
7719	National Savings Bank
7728	Sanasa Development Bank
7737	HDFC Bank
7746	Citizen Development Business Finance PLC
7755	Regional Development Bank
7764	State Mortgage and Investment Bank
7773	LB Finance
7782	Senkadagala Finance
7807	Commercial Leasing and Finance
7816	Vallibel Finance
7825	Central Finance
7834	Kanrich Finance
7861	Lanka Orix Finance
8004	Central Bank of Sri Lanka

== See also ==
- LankaPay
- Economy of Sri Lanka
- http://www.lankaclear.com/
