= Dhammika Perera =

Sri Lankan businessman and politician

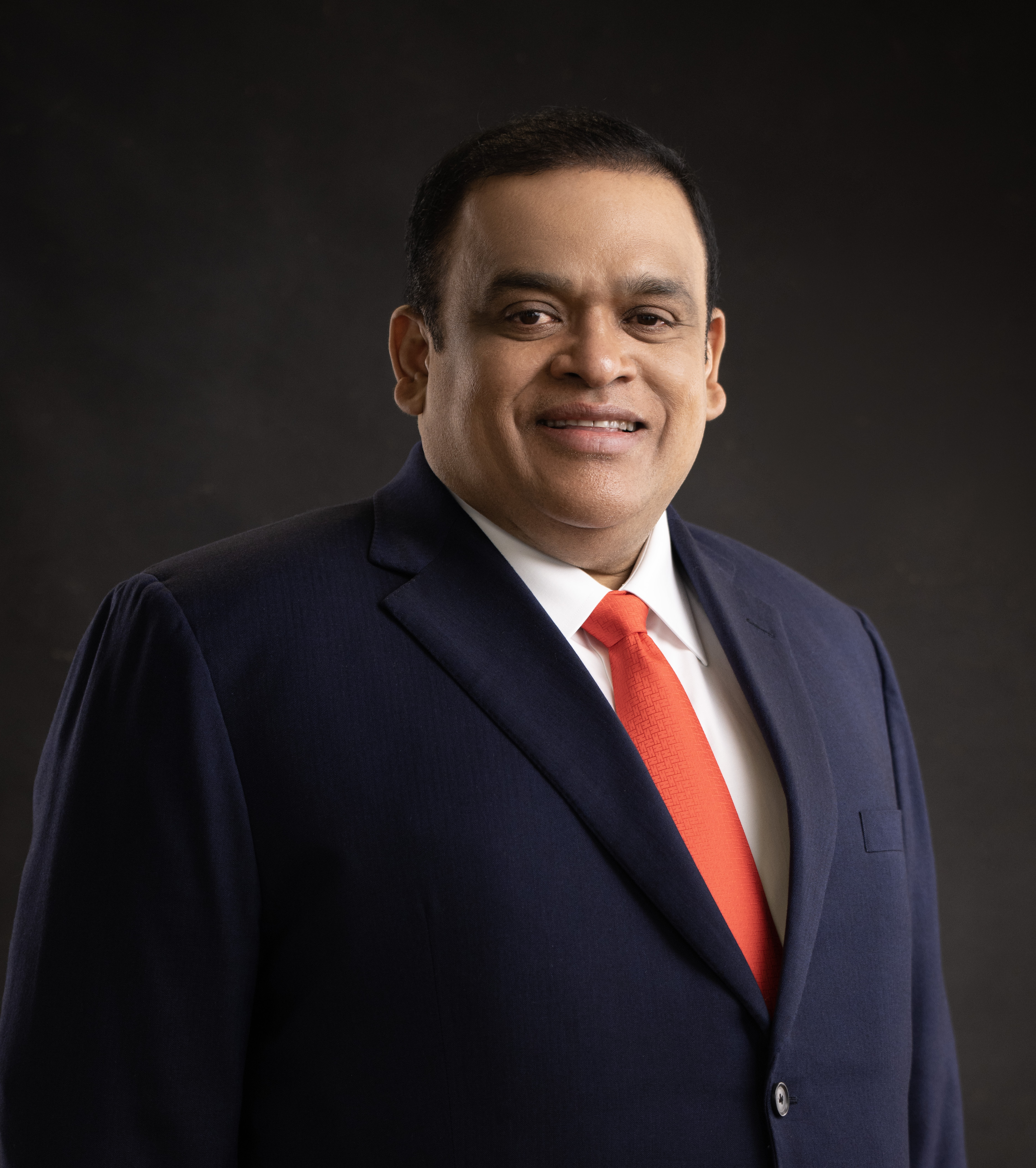
- Dhammika in 2023

Minister of Investment Promotion
- In office 24 June 2022 – 10 July 2022
- President: Gotabaya Rajapaksa
- Prime Minister: Ranil Wickramasinghe

Member of Parliament for National List
- In office 22 June 2022 – 24 September 2024
- Preceded by: Basil Rajapaksa

Transport Secretary
- In office January 2011 – January 2015
- President: Mahinda Rajapaksa
- Preceded by: B. M. U. D. Basnayake
- Succeeded by: Lalithasiri Gunaruwan

Personal details
- Born: Kulappu Arachchige Don Dhammika Perera; December 28, 1967 (age 58) Payagala, Kalutara, Sri Lanka.
- Party: Sri Lanka Podujana Peramuna (2022 - present)
- Spouse: Priscilla Perera
- Children: 3
- Education: Taxila Central College, Horana
- Occupation: Businessman, corporate raider, politician
- Website: www.dhammikaperera.lk

Kulappu Arachchige Don Dhammika Perera, commonly known as Dhammika Perera (born December 28, 1967), is a Sri Lankan billionaire businessman and politician. A top corporate leader, he is one of the wealthiest people in Sri Lanka, controlling 23 listed companies on the Colombo Stock Exchange. Perera owns a controlling stake in the conglomerates Hayleys and Vallibel One, a company he founded. Through Hayleys, Perera controls Amaya Leisure, The Kingsbury and Singer (Sri Lanka) while Royal Ceramics, LB Finance, and Lanka Tiles are controlled by Vallibel One. Perera has been closely linked to the former President Mahinda Rajapaksa, having served as chairman of the Board of Investment of Sri Lanka from 2007 to 2010 and Transport Secretary from 2011 to 2015. He was appointed a Member of Parliament in the National List in June 2022, succeeding Basil Rajapaksa from the Sri Lanka Podujana Peramuna, briefly serving President Gotabaya Rajapaksa as his Minister of Investment Promotion from June to July 2022.

== Early life and education ==
Dhammika Perera was born in 1967 in Payagala in the Kalutara District. His father was a grocery businessman and his mother was a school teacher. He had two brothers and a sister. He completed his primary and secondary education at the Taxila Central College, Horana and started on the NDT program at the Institute of Technology, University of Moratuwa. Dropping out, he began a business venture in 1986 at the age of 19.

== Business career ==
=== Early business ventures in manufacturing and gambling ===
As a teenager, Dhammika Perera started putting money into a street hawker who ran a business in front of his uncle's café. He then rented slot machines, installing them in his uncle's café. In 1987, dropping out of the NDT program, Perera went to Taiwan for three months of technical training. On his return to Sri Lanka, he started a machine manufacturing business making slot machines close to his residence in Payagala and continued until 1991, when President Ranasinghe Premadasa imposed a ban on jackpot/slot machines. Following the ban he moved into car sales in Payagala, before moving into the gambling business by starting his first casino in 1993, which is now owned and managed by his two brothers. He also ran Tito Electronics, an electronic shop repairing electronic circuit boards in Colpetty. He started a business producing and selling neon bulbs in 1995, at a time when none of the manufacturers was keen on selling those bulbs.

=== Corporate leader ===
In 1999, his business career took a new direction after he met Nadeem ul Haque, then senior resident representative of the International Monetary Fund in Sri Lanka, who became his mentor. Ul Haque organized a seminar for him on infrastructure and business development at KfW in Germany, where he learnt the use of mathematical modelling in business acquisitions and aspects of risk and cash-flow management. With Ul Haque he drew up a 20-year plan, targeting 12 sectors.

==== Banking and finance ====
He acquired a majority stake in Pan Asia Bank in 2000, at a time when the bank was regarded as a loss-making financial institution. He met investor Nimal Perera after acquiring the Pan Asia Bank stake, who become his close business partner until the duo parted ways in 2017. In 2003, his holding company Vallibel Holdings took over LB Finance. He acquired the family-owned The Rupee Finance Company Limited in 2005, which was later rebranded as Vallibel Finance and took it to an initial public offering in 2010. He has been the executive director of Vallibel Finance since 2014.

==== Manufacturing, trading and leisure ====
In 2002, Dhammika Perera, through his Vallibel Holdings, bought controlling stakes in four companies in the stock market, having made short-term transactions during the bull run. In 2003, he took over Royal Ceramics having become the major shareholder and buying out minority shareholders. That year he gained a 56.07% stake of Ruhunu Hotels and Travels Limited which owned Club Horizon Hotel, Koggala which was later renamed as The Fortress Resort & Spa. In 2008, Perera acquired a controlling stake in Hayleys PLC, the Sri Lankan conglomerate founded in 1878. In 2010, Perera's Vallibel One took over the Delmege Group, which had been founded in 1850. By 2013, Dhammika Perera and Nimal Perera had taken over majority control over Hayleys, becoming its co-chairman. With Hayleys, Perera gained control over several subsidiaries owned by Hayleys, including Amaya Leisure, Haycarb, Hayleys Fabric PLC, The Kingsbury and Dipped Products. In 2013, Vallibel One-owned Royal Ceramics took over Lanka Ceramics PLC, and with it came Swisstek.

In 2013, Perera became Sri Lanka's wealthiest individual, with a net worth estimated by Forbes Asia at 72.6 billion LKR (approx. 550 million US dollars).

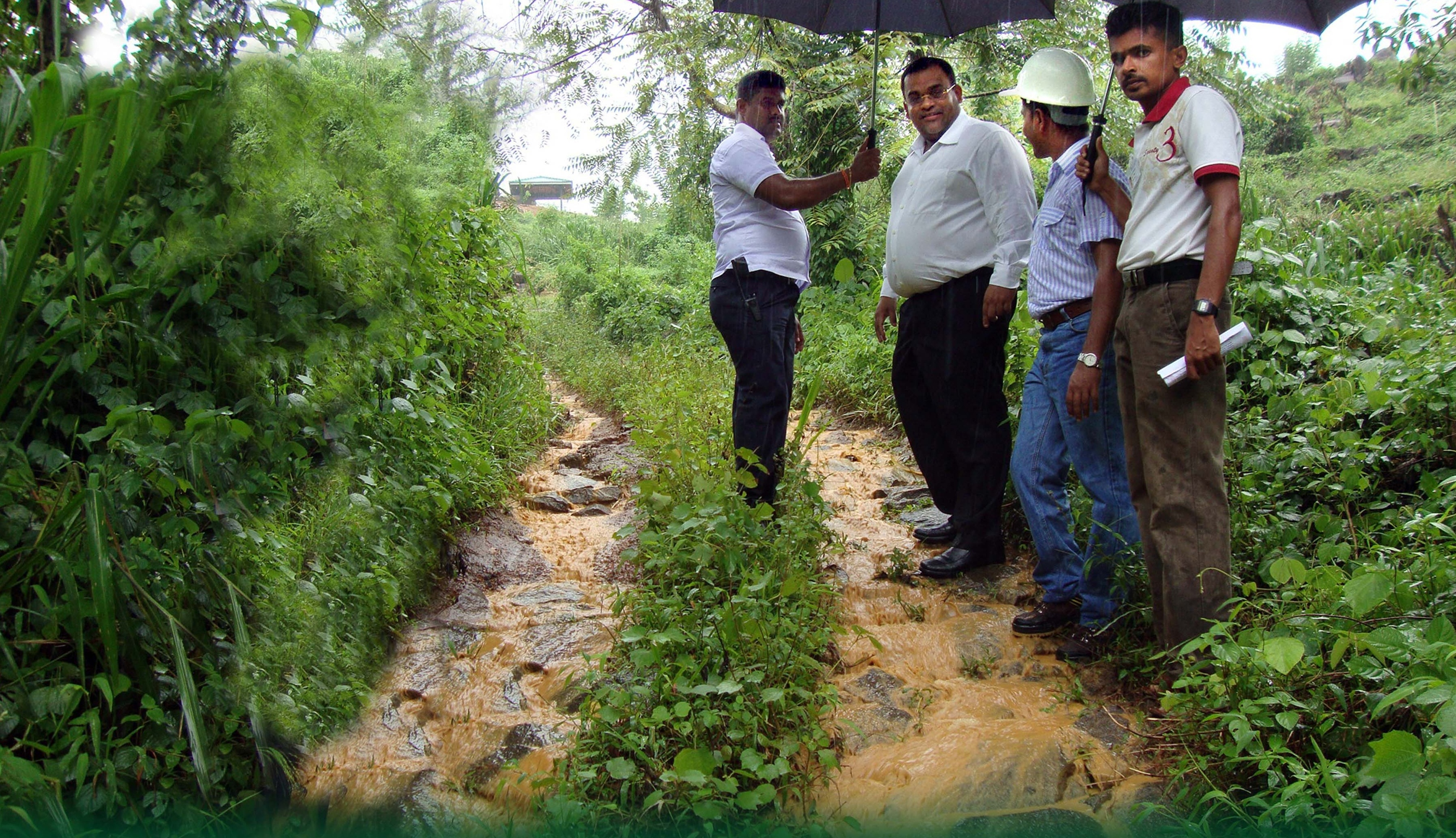
Perera (second from left) inspecting the construction site of Denawaka Ganga Mini Hydro Power Project, a subsidiary of Vallibel Power Erathna, October 2010

Perera became the chairman of Lanka Tiles in 2017 and was appointed the co-chairman of Singer (Sri Lanka) in October 2017 after Hayleys agreed to buy Singer. Perera was appointed the chairman of Director Board of Lanka Ceramic PLC in 2017, but he resigned from the position on 31 August 2018. He was also appointed chairman of Board of Directors of Lanka Walltiles in 2017.

==== Gambling ====
Perera continued to own three of the five casinos in Colombo, namely Bally's Colombo, Bellagio Colombo and The Ritz Club. In 2014, Dhammika Perera planned to start a joint venture project with Australian gambling tycoon James Packer's Crown Casino of a value more than US$300 million, but the project was rejected by the newly elected United National Front Government.

=== Importation of clinical waste ===
In July 2019, Perera and his company Hayleys were accused by MP Kanaka Herath of earning income through the illegal import of garbage from the United Kingdom. Hayleys has since denied any wrongdoing in the matter and highlighted the fact that the Group's logistics arm was merely providing logistics services including storage, value addition and re-exportation for its client Ceylon Metal Processing Corporation for a resource recovery operation. Calling for a press conference on 22 July 2019, the managing director of Hayleys Advantis Limited, Ruwan Waidyaratne, categorically denied the allegations levelled against the company. Concerning 130 container loads of used mattresses that were stored at their Free Zone yard premises, the company clarified that the mattresses were imported by Ceylon Metal Processing Corporation (Pvt) Limited, the actual owner of the cargo.

== Political career ==
=== Board of Investment of Sri Lanka ===
President Mahinda Rajapaksa, appointed Perera as chairman of the Board of Investment of Sri Lanka (BoI) in April 2007, he served till May 2010. During his tenure, Perera came under fire for changing the approval process for new investment projects in Sri Lanka, by reducing the role of the BoI in gaining approvals from other institutions on behalf of the investor and for not carrying out proper checks before providing its own approval.

=== Transport Secretary ===
During Rajapaksa's second term, he appointed Perera Secretary to the Ministry of Transport in January 2011, making little headway until he resigned in January 2015 following the Rajapaksa's defeat in the 2015 Sri Lankan presidential election.

=== Sri Lanka 2030: A Developed Nation ===
In January 2019, he stated that he was willing to take the post of Treasury Secretary to the Ministry of Finance if invited to do so. In September 2019, Perera published a document Sri Lanka 2030: A Developed Nation, with policy recommendations for 21 ministries with the aim of increasing Sri Lanka's per capita income to $12,000 by 2030. Following is the list of recommendations given for individual ministries:

1. Ministry of National Security: A nation rich in safety and freedom
2. Ministry of Finance and Planning: A nation rich in wealth
3. Ministry of Education: A nation rich in human capital
4. Ministry of Higher Education: A nation rich in human capital
5. Ministry of Technical, Vocational Education and Training (TVET): A nation rich in human capital
6. Ministry of Social Development: A nation rich in happiness
7. Ministry of Regional Development: A nation rich in convenience
8. Ministry of Justice and Prison Reforms: A nation rich in discipline
9. Ministry of Agriculture and agro-based industry: A nation rich in prosperity
10. Ministry of Environment and Natural Resources: A nation rich in biomes
11. Ministry of Health: A nation rich in wellbeing
12. Ministry of Investment Promotion and Job Creation: A nation rich in industries
13. Ministry of Foreign Affairs: A nation rich in diplomacy
14. Ministry of Information and Communication Technology: A nation rich in technology
15. Ministry of Transport: A nation rich in mobility
16. Ministry of Ports and Shipping: A nation rich in maritime logistics
17. Ministry of Tourism: A nation rich in hospitality
18. Ministry of Religious Affairs and Interfaith Harmony: A nation rich in unity
19. Ministry of Arts and Culture: A nation rich in heritage
20. Ministry of Fisheries: A nation rich in fish trade
21. Ministry of Civil Aviation: A nation rich in connectivity

=== Dhammika and Priscilla Perera Foundation ===
In October 2019, Perera and his wife Priscilla founded a private charity, Dhammika and Priscilla Perera Foundation (DP Foundation) with the aim of improving education and healthcare standards in Sri Lanka. The foundation is organized into two impact areas: education and healthcare.

==== DP Education ====
In 2019, Perera launched DP Education on YouTube providing online learning for school going children in Sri Lanka. Perera created 120 DP Education IT Campuses across Sri Lanka to deliver quality IT Education for the students. In 2024, he launched "DP Silicon Valley IT Office" intending to create coders to improve the digital economy.

=== Member of Parliament ===
During the Sri Lankan economic crisis, in May 2022, he outlined 12 strategies that aimed to generate an additional inflow of US$8 billion per annum. Following the resignation of former Finance Minister Basil Rajapaksa, there was speculation that Dhammika Perera was tipped to succeed him from the ruling party to fill the now vacant seat in parliament. As per the CSE filing, on 10 June 2022, Perera resigned from the boards of directors of Hayleys PLC, Singer (Sri Lanka) PLC, Hayleys Fabric PLC, Hayleys Leisure PLC, Haycarb PLC, and The Kingsbury PLC. Hayleys and subsidiaries separately announced his resignation from the board of directors. Companies which announced the move on 10 June 2022 included Hayleys PLC and its subsidiaries, Vallibel One PLC and its subsidiaries, Singer Sri Lanka PLC and its subsidiaries, Royal Ceramics Group, Lanka Walltiles Group and LB Finance PLC. In most of these entities, he was either the chairman or executive director.

On June 22, 2022, Perera was sworn in as a National list member of Parliament, after being proposed to the Election Commission by the Sri Lanka Podujana Peramuna, having taken up party membership to fill the seat vacated by the resignation of former Finance Minister Basil Rajapaksa.

=== Minister of Investment Promotion ===
On June 24, he was sworn in as the Minister of Investment Promotion. Days later on 10 July, he resigned from his ministerial position.

=== Presidential candidate ===
In October 2023, Perera stated his intent to become a presidential candidate for the next presidential election if political parties including the Sri Lanka Podujana Peramuna can provide assurances that it could gain a 51% majority in the election. He stated that 1.5 million students from 1.1 million families are benefiting from the D.P. Education initiative commenced by him.

On 6 August 2024, by a letter addressed to the General Secretary of Sri Lanka Podujana Peramuna, Dhammika Perera conveyed his intention to withdraw from seeking the party nomination.

== See also ==
- List of Sri Lankan non-career Permanent Secretaries
