= LAUGFS Gas =

Energy company in Sri Lanka

LAUGFS Gas PLC
- Logo of LAUGFS Gas
- Company type: Public
- Traded as: CSE: LGL.N0000
- ISIN: LK0371N00001
- Industry: Energy
- Founded: 2000; 26 years ago
- Headquarters: Colombo, Sri Lanka
- Key people: W. K. H. Wegapitiya (Chairman); Thilak De Silva (Deputy Chairman); Piyadasa Kudabalage (Managing Director)
- Revenue: ▼LKR34,597 million (2022)
- Operating income: ▼LKR(2,276) million (2022)
- Net income: ▼LKR(3,982) million (2022)
- Total assets: ▲LKR57,703 million (2022)
- Total equity: ▲LKR6,189 million (2022)
- Owners: LAUGFS Holdings (74.02%); Employees' Provident Fund (17.82%)
- Number of employees: 344 (2022)
- Parent: LAUGFS Holdings
- Subsidiaries: See text
- Website: www.laugfsgas.lk

LAUGFS Gas PLC is a liquefied petroleum gas (LPG) company based in Sri Lanka. The company commenced operations in 2001 and in 2010, was listed on the Colombo Stock Exchange following an initial public offering. LAUGFS Gas expanded its operations to Bangladesh and the United Arab Emirates. In 2019, the company opened an LPG terminal at the Hambantota International Port, the largest of its kind in South Asia. LAUGFS Gas is ranked 33rd in LMD 100, an annual list of Sri Lankan listed companies by revenue. The Sri Lankan economic crisis heavily affected the operations of the company. Difficulties in securing foreign exchange have resulted in the disruption of LPG imports, shortages in the market and long queues. The company controls a number of subsidiaries but divested its Bangladesh operations in November 2022.

== History ==
The company was incorporated as LAUGFS Gas (Pvt) Ltd in 2000 and signed an agreement with the Board of Investment of Sri Lanka. In 2001, LAUGFS Gas entered into a tripartite agreement with the Ceylon Petroleum Corporation (CPC) and the Ministry of Finance to purchase CPC-produced LPG. The company commenced operations in the same year. The company bought its first LPG vessel LAUGFS Wega in 2002. In the following years, the company expanded its LPG fleet with the fourth vessel, Gas Courage being bought in 2017. The gas price formula was introduced in 2007 after signing an agreement with the Consumer Affairs Authority.

LAUGFS Gas announced an LKR2.5 billion initial public offering in 2010 and was listed on the Colombo Stock Exchange. The company expanded to Bangladesh in 2015. LAUGFS Gas completed the building of the LPG terminal in Hambantota International Port in 2018 and in the following year, the terminal, the largest LPG terminal in South Asia commenced operations.

On 9 October 2025, the Office of Foreign Assets Control (OFAC) of the United States Department of the Treasury (USDT) imposed sanctions on SLOGAL Energy DMCC, a UAE-based subsidiary of LAUGFS Gas, for allegedly trading in Iranian-origin petrochemical products. The sanctions were issued pursuant to Executive Order (E.O.) 13902 and also to E.O. 13846.

== Operations ==
In July 2021, the company halted importing LPG after Consumer Affairs Authority refused a price hike despite increased raw material prices. LAUGFS Gas was ranked 33rd in LMD 100, an annual list of listed companies in Sri Lanka by revenue in the financial year of 2020/21. Brand Finance ranked LAUGFS Gas as the 70th most valuable brand in Sri Lanka for 2022 with a brand value of LKR816 million. The company controls 20% of the LPG market share in Sri Lanka. In November 2022, the company celebrated their 21st anniversary.

=== Sri Lankan economic crisis ===
LAUGFS Gas is faced with difficulties in procuring US dollars from banks to open letters of credit during the Sri Lankan economic crisis. As a result, the company was unable to export gas to the country. The lack of forex reserves for importing LPG caused gas shortages in the market and LAUGFS Gas and its duopolistic competitor Litro Gas suspended gas distribution. People were forced to stand in long queues to purchase gas. In March 2022, prices soared by a record amount. By December 2022, the market conditions were improved and the company ensured a continuous supply of LP gas.

Soaring prices, price of a LAUGFS 12.5kg gas cylinder
Month	Price (LKR)
Before August 2021	1,493
August 2021	1,856
October 2021	2,840
March 2022	4,199
June 2022	6,850
August 2022	5,800
October 2022	5,300

== Subsidiaries ==
LAUGFS Gas divested its 69% stake in LAUGFS Gas (Bangladesh) for US$16.1 million in November 2022. 31% stake in Dubai-based SLOGAL Energy also sold for US$7.254 million. LAUGFS Gas announced it would use the proceeds to reduce the debt exposure of LAUGFS Gas (Bangladesh).

Subsidiary	Country of incorporation	Functional currency	Activity	Stake
LAUGFS Gas (Bangladesh) Ltd	Bangladesh	Bangladeshi taka	Sale of LPG	69%
LAUGFS Maritime Services (Pvt) Ltd	Sri Lanka	Sri Lankan rupee	Operating vessels and providing marine cargo services	100%
LAUGFS Property Developers (Pvt) Ltd	Sri Lanka	Sri Lankan rupee	Operating a business property in Kirulapana, Colombo	75%
LAUGFS Terminals Ltd	Sri Lanka	United States dollar	Operating an LPG storage terminal	100%
SLOGAL Energy DMCC	United Arab Emirates	United States dollar	Trading and exporting LPG	100%

Source: Annual Report, 2021/22

== See also ==
- List of companies listed on the Colombo Stock Exchange
