= Swisstek =

Sri Lankan manufacturing company

Swisstek (Ceylon) PLC
- Logo of Swisstek (Ceylon)
- Formerly: Parquet (Ceylon) (1967-2011)
- Company type: Public
- Traded as: CSE: PARQ.N0000
- ISIN: LK0135N00000
- Industry: Materials
- Founded: July 12, 1967; 58 years ago
- Founder: Singha Weerasekera (Founding Chairman)
- Headquarters: Colombo, Sri Lanka
- Key people: S. H. Amarasekera (Chairman); Daminda Perera (Group Managing Director)
- Revenue: ▼LKR8,970 million (2023)
- Operating income: ▲LKR1,263 million (2023)
- Net income: ▼LKR(703) million (2023)
- Total assets: ▲LKR10,911 million (2023)
- Total equity: ▼LKR2,315 million (2023)
- Owners: Lanka Tiles PLC (47.80%); Lanka Walltiles PLC (11.48%); Royal Ceramics Lanka PLC (6.88%)
- Number of employees: ▼481 (2023)
- Subsidiaries: Swisstek Aluminium Ltd (87.38%)
- Website: swisstekceylon.com

Swisstek (Ceylon) PLC is a tile grout and tile mortar manufacturing company in Sri Lanka. The company was established in 1967 as Parquet (Ceylon) Ltd to manufacture parquetry. Parquet (Ceylon) signed an agreement with Switzerland-based Bauwerk AG for technology collaboration and started supplying for the domestic and foreign markets under the brand name "Swissparkett". The company was listed on the Colombo Stock Exchange in 1983. Parquet (Ceylon) switched its core business by switching to manufacturing tile grout and mortar in 2009. In 2011, the company was renamed Swisstek (Ceylon) and in 2013, became a part of the Vallibel One Group. Swisstek is one of the LMD 100 companies in Sri Lanka.

== History ==
The company was founded in 1967 as Parquet (Ceylon) Ltd to manufacture parquetry. Singha Weerasekera, the then-chairman of Don Carolis and Sons, was the founding chairman of Parquet (Ceylon). Parquet (Ceylon) entered into a technology collaboration with Switzerland-based Bauwerk AG and supplied the domestic market under the brand name "Swissparkett". The company expanded its business to foreign markets in 1972. The company was listed on the Colombo Stock Exchange in 1983. Parquet (Ceylon) became a part of Lanka Walltiles Group in 2003. In 2009, the company switched its core business of manufacturing parquetry to manufacturing tile grout and mortar. Even though the company ceased manufacturing parquetry, the sale of imported parquetry in the domestic market continued.

Parquet (Ceylon) acquired 62% of the stake in Ceykor Aluminium Industries for LKR100 million in a bid for diversification in 2010. Parquet (Ceylon) change name to Swisstek (Ceylon) in 2011. A Royal Ceramics-led consortium acquired a controlling stake in Lanka Ceramics PLC in 2013, thus Royal Ceramics' parent Vallibel One became the ultimate parent company of Swisstek. The company celebrated its 50th anniversary in 2017. Swisstek Aluminium moved to increase its production capacity of 450mt to 1,000mt per month in 2017. The demand for aluminium stood at 2,500mt per month then. Swisstek secured a US$4.5 million timber flooring contract from the Cinnamon Life Colombo project in 2019. The contract is the largest timber flooring deal awarded in Sri Lanka. Swisstek entered into the contract to supply and install 350,000 square feet (33,000 m^{2}) of solid wood flooring for the project.

== Operations ==
Swisstek is one of the LMD 100 companies in Sri Lanka. LMD 100 ranks the public companies in Sri Lanka by revenue annually, and in its 2020/21 edition Swisstek was ranked 95th. Swisstek (Ceylon) also produces skim coats and decorative pebbles, and its subsidiary, Swisstek Aluminium manufactures aluminium extrusions. Alumex, a related company of Swisstek is the market leader in aluminium production and controls 46% of the market share. Swisstek Aluminium Ltd has control of 30% of the market share.

== Finances ==
Financial summary All figures are in LKR (mns)
Year	Revenue	Operating income	Profit	Assets	Equity
2023	8,970	1,263	(703)	10,911	2,315
2022	9,534	1,231	900	10,721	3,360
2021	5,393	975	640	6,576	2,881
2020	4,935	610	168	6,110	2,267
2019	4,294	420	750	6,504	2,101
2018	4,077	630	378	5,430	2,144

Source: Annual Report, 2022/23 (pp. 130–131)

== See also ==
- List of companies listed on the Colombo Stock Exchange
