= The Fortress Resort & Spa =

Boutique hotel in Koggala, Sri Lanka

- Logo of The Fortress Resort & Spa

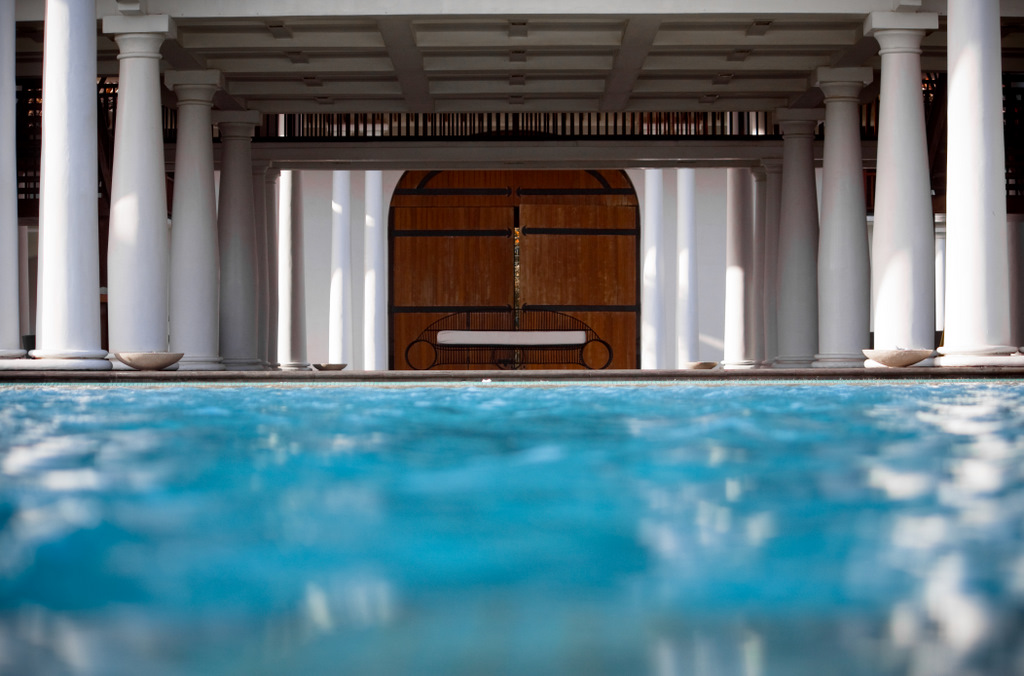
- Swimming pool of the resort

General information
- Type: Hotel
- Coordinates: 5°59′12″N 80°19′36″E
- Opened: March 29, 1973; 52 years ago

Other information
- Number of rooms: 49
- Number of suites: 4
- Number of restaurants: 4

Website
- www.fortressresortandspa.com

Company
- Company type: Public
- Traded as: CSE: RHTL.N0000
- ISIN: LK0308N00003
- Industry: Hospitality
- Key people: Harendra Perera (Chairman/Managing Director); Merrill J. Fernando (Director)
- Revenue: ▲LKR435 million (2023)
- Net income: ▼LKR(19) million (2023)
- Total assets: ▼LKR1,826 million (2023)
- Total equity: ▼LKR1,609 million (2023)
- Owner: MJF Holdings (25.81%); Vallibel Leisure (Pvt) Ltd (22.02%); Vallibel One (18.59%)
- Number of employees: 188 (2023)

The Fortress Resort & Spa, traded as The Fortress Resorts PLC, is a luxury boutique hotel in Koggala, Sri Lanka. The resort was incorporated in 1973. The resort is listed on the Colombo Stock Exchange. In 2003, Sri Lankan entrepreneur, Dhammika Perera acquired a controlling stake in the resort. The resort was formerly known as Club Horizon Hotel, Koggala and was renamed to its current name in the same year. The hotel was affected by the 2019 Easter bombings. The resort is designed like a fortress to enclose a Dutch-era villa.

== History ==
The resort was incorporated in 1973 under the name Ruhunu Hotels and Travels Limited. In 1999, the resort was listed on the Colombo Stock Exchange. The resort was formerly known as Club Horizon Hotel, Koggala. Sri Lankan entrepreneur, Dhammika Perera acquired a controlling stake of 56.07% of the resort in 2003. Connaissance Hotels were designated to manage the resort. The resort adopted its current name in December 2003.

In 2016, the resort moved to build a five-star resort at a cost of LKR2.1 billion in Weligama. The resort's subsidiary, La Forteresse invested LKR364 million to build the 66-roomed resort. La Forteresse bought 3 acres (1.2 ha) of land from LB Finance, a company held by Dhammika Perera. The resort was affected by the 2019 Sri Lanka Easter bombings. As a result of the attack, 750 room nights were cancelled, affecting the resort's occupancy rate.

== Operations ==
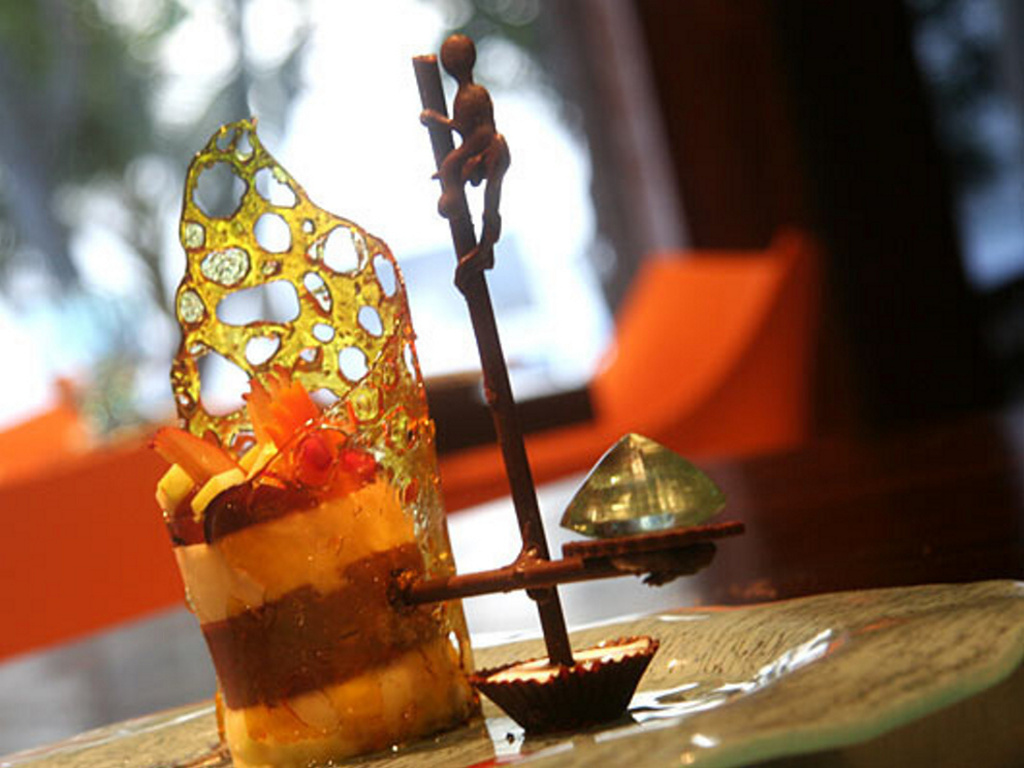
The resort offered what it called the most expensive dessert in the world, The Fortress Stilt Fisherman Indulgence which was priced at US$14,500

The resort is designed like a fortress enclosing a Dutch villa. The resort made headlines for offering a dessert priced at US$14,500 in 2007. The resort claimed it to be the most expensive dessert in the world at the time. The Fortress Stilt Fisherman Indulgence is a gold leaf cassata flavoured with Irish cream. The dessert is served with mango, pomegranate compote and Champagne sabayon. The dessert is adorned with a chocolate carving of a fisherman on a stilt and an 80-carat aquamarine.

The Fortress Resort won the Bocuse d'Or Sri Lanka prize for the second time in 2019. The resort first won the Bocuse d'Or Sri Lanka award in 2015, also securing fifth place in the Bocuse d'Or South East Asia competition. The hotel was also included in the “Considerate Collection” by Small Luxury Hotels of the World. This collection included 26 actively sustainable hotels.

== Amenities ==
The Fortress is located in Koggala, a coastal town in Southern Province, Sri Lanka, 15 kilometres (9.3 mi) from Galle. The main restaurant of the resort is called White. It serves Sri Lankan buffets and seafood grills. An à la carte menu is also available. Salty Snapper specializes in seafood dishes. The fine dining restaurant of the resort is Duo. The restaurant is located in a glass-enclosed cellar housing a collection of 2,000 wines. T-lounge serves high teas, pastries and cheesecake. The resort's spa has won several awards over the years. It offers Ayurvedic treatments, aromatherapy and a variety of Eastern wellness therapies. The hotel also includes a gym and meetings, incentives, conferencing, exhibitions (MICE) facilities.

== See also ==
- List of hotels in Sri Lanka
- List of companies listed on the Colombo Stock Exchange
