= Lanka Tiles =

Sri Lankan manufacturing company

Lanka Tiles PLC
- Logo of Lanka Tiles PLC
- Formerly: Lanka Floortiles (1999-2013)
- Company type: Public
- Traded as: CSE: TILE.N0000
- ISIN: LK0114N00005
- Industry: Capital goods
- Founded: March 30, 1984; 42 years ago
- Headquarters: Colombo, Sri Lanka
- Key people: A. M. Weerasinghe (Chairman); J. A. P. M. Jayasekera (Managing Director)
- Revenue: ▲LKR18.684 billion (2023)
- Operating income: ▲LKR5.298 billion (2023)
- Net income: ▼LKR3.688 billion (2023)
- Total assets: ▲LKR18.627 billion (2023)
- Total equity: ▲LKR12.932 billion (2023)
- Number of employees: ▲744 (2023)
- Parent: Lanka Walltiles PLC (68.217%)
- Subsidiaries: Swisstek (Ceylon) PLC (47.80%; Associate company)
- Website: www.lankatiles.com

Lanka Tiles PLC, doing business as LANKATILES, is a glazed ceramic and porcelain tile manufacturing company in Sri Lanka. The company was incorporated in 1984 and two years later was listed on the Colombo Stock Exchange. Lanka Tiles was a part of the government-owned Ceylon Ceramics Corporation. In 1991, all but one division of Ceylon Ceramics Corporation was incorporated as Lanka Ceramic Limited. Ceylon Theatres acquired Lanka Ceramic from the government of Sri Lanka. In 2013, Royal Ceramics acquired 80% of the stake in Lanka Ceramic, thus bringing Lanka Tiles under the umbrella of the Vallibel One Group. The company capitalised on an anti-dumping duty imposed by the government of the United States on goods originating in China and started exporting mosaic tiles to the United States. Lanka Tiles was one of the 100 most valuable brands in Sri Lanka in 2022. Due to weakening demand as a result of the prevailing economic crisis in the country, the company restarted its operations in India. Lanka Tiles is also an LMD 100 company in Sri Lanka.

== History ==
Lanka Tiles was incorporated on 30 March 1984. The company was listed on the Colombo Stock Exchange two years later. Lanka Tiles and its present parent Lanka Walltiles were parts of the government-owned Ceylon Ceramics Corporation. In 1987, the company exported 80% of its production. In line with the government policy of privatisation, all but one division of Ceylon Ceramics Corporation incorporated as Lanka Ceramic Limited in 1991. When the government divested its stake in Lanka Ceramic, Ceylon Theatres acquired 65% of the stake. Lanka Tiles was renamed Lanka Floortiles after the acquisition.

Workers of the company launched a strike action in August 2010, demanding a pay increase. The strike action was resolved after 19 days following successful salary negotiations with the trade union. 450 workers out of a 580-cadre strike again in 2011. The workers agreed to abide by the collective agreement. A consortium led by Royal Ceramics acquired 80% of Lanka Tiles's parent Lanka Ceramic in May 2013, bringing Lanka Tiles under the Vallibel One Group. With the acquisition, Royal Ceramics gained a near-monopoly of the Sri Lankan tile market. Lanka Tiles invested LKR200 million to export mosaic tiles to the United States in 2019. The company signed an agreement with the Chinese firm Foshan Shiwan Yulong Ceramic and Benjamin Malloy. The agreement was signed when the United States government imposed an anti-dumping duty on ceramic products of Chinese origin. In the same year, Lanka Tiles expanded its contract manufacturing in India to combat cheap imports from India. A few years earlier, the company signed an agreement with Ambani Vitrified to manufacture glazed vitrified tiles.

== Operations ==
Lanka Tiles is included in the 2022 100 most valuable brand index in Sri Lanka. The company ranked 48th, rising by ten ranking positions from the previous year. Even though the government imposed an import ban on tiles, Lanka Tiles is facing rising raw material, machinery costs and weakening demand due to the prevailing economic crisis. Lanka Tiles restarted its tile manufacturing operations in India and also planning on opening a distribution channel. Despite the company ramping up production, the company came to realise its demand was falling in Sri Lanka and inventories were building up.

== Ranking ==
Lanka Tiles was one of the LMD 100 companies in Sri Lanka. Lanka Tiles is ranked 68th in the 2022 rankings. LMD 100 lists the quoted companies in Sri Lanka by revenue annually.

== See also ==
- List of companies listed on the Colombo Stock Exchange
