= Yanika Amarasekera-Siyaguna =

Sri Lankan entrepreneur

- Education: University of California, Berkeley; Imperial College London
- Occupation: Entrepreneur
- Known for: Founder of Silver Aisle

Yanika Amarasekera-Siyaguna is a Sri Lankan entrepreneur and the founder of Silver Aisle, an e-commerce company specialising in wedding registries, gifts and experiences. In 2025, she was included in the Forbes 30 Under 30 Asia list in the Retail & E-commerce category.

== Early life and education ==
Amarasekera-Siyaguna studied at the University of California, Berkeley, where she completed bachelor's degrees in Political Economy and Mass Communication with an emphasis on digital marketing. She subsequently completed a master's degree in Entrepreneurship, Innovation and Management at Imperial College London.

== Career ==
=== Silver Aisle ===
After returning to Sri Lanka, Amarasekera-Siyaguna founded Silver Aisle in 2019. The company initially operated as an online wedding gift registry, allowing couples to create lists of items they wanted to receive as wedding gifts. The service was launched in December 2019.

The launch coincided with the beginning of the COVID-19 pandemic in Sri Lanka, which resulted in weddings being postponed or cancelled. Amarasekera-Siyaguna subsequently expanded Silver Aisle into a broader gifting service. The platform later included gifts and experiences for different occasions, including dining, holidays and recreational activities.

The expansion helped Silver Aisle develop from a wedding registry into a broader e-commerce platform. In an interview with The Sunday Times, Amarasekera-Siyaguna said the company was preparing to expand into the Middle East.

=== Forbes 30 Under 30 ===
In May 2025, Amarasekera-Siyaguna was included in the Forbes 30 Under 30 Asia list in the Retail & E-commerce category. Forbes described her as the founder of Silver Aisle and noted the company's expansion from wedding registries into gifts and experiences.

She was one of three Sri Lankans included in the 2025 Forbes 30 Under 30 Asia list, alongside entrepreneur Nikin Matharaarachchi and content creator Charith N. Silva.

The recognition was also reported by Daily FT and Daily Mirror, which described her work with Silver Aisle and her role in the Sri Lankan business sector.

=== Corporate directorship ===
In February 2023, Amarasekera-Siyaguna was appointed an independent non-executive director of LB Finance.

She subsequently served on the company's board and its committees. LB Finance's 2024–25 integrated annual report listed her as an independent non-executive director.

She resigned from the LB Finance board effective 24 September 2025, according to the company's interim financial statements for the period ended 30 September 2025.
