= Empire Tower =

Empire Tower may refer to:

- Empire Tower, Bangkok in Bangkok, Thailand
- Empire Tower, Colombo in Colombo, Sri Lanka
- Empire Tower, Malaysia in Kuala Lumpur, Malaysia
- Empire Tower, Toronto in Toronto, Canada
- SS Empire Tower, a cargo ship torpedoed and sunk during the Second World War
