= National Cancer Institute (disambiguation) =

National Cancer Institute is an American governmental health agency.

National Cancer Institute may also refer to:

- National Cancer Institute (Egypt), organization dedicated to treatment, management and developing a cure to cancer
- National Cancer Institute (Sri Lanka), government hospital in Maharagama, Sri Lanka
- National Cancer Institute of Canada, Canada's largest national cancer charity
