= Pan Asia Bank =

Sri Lankan commercial bank

Pan Asia Banking Corporation PLC
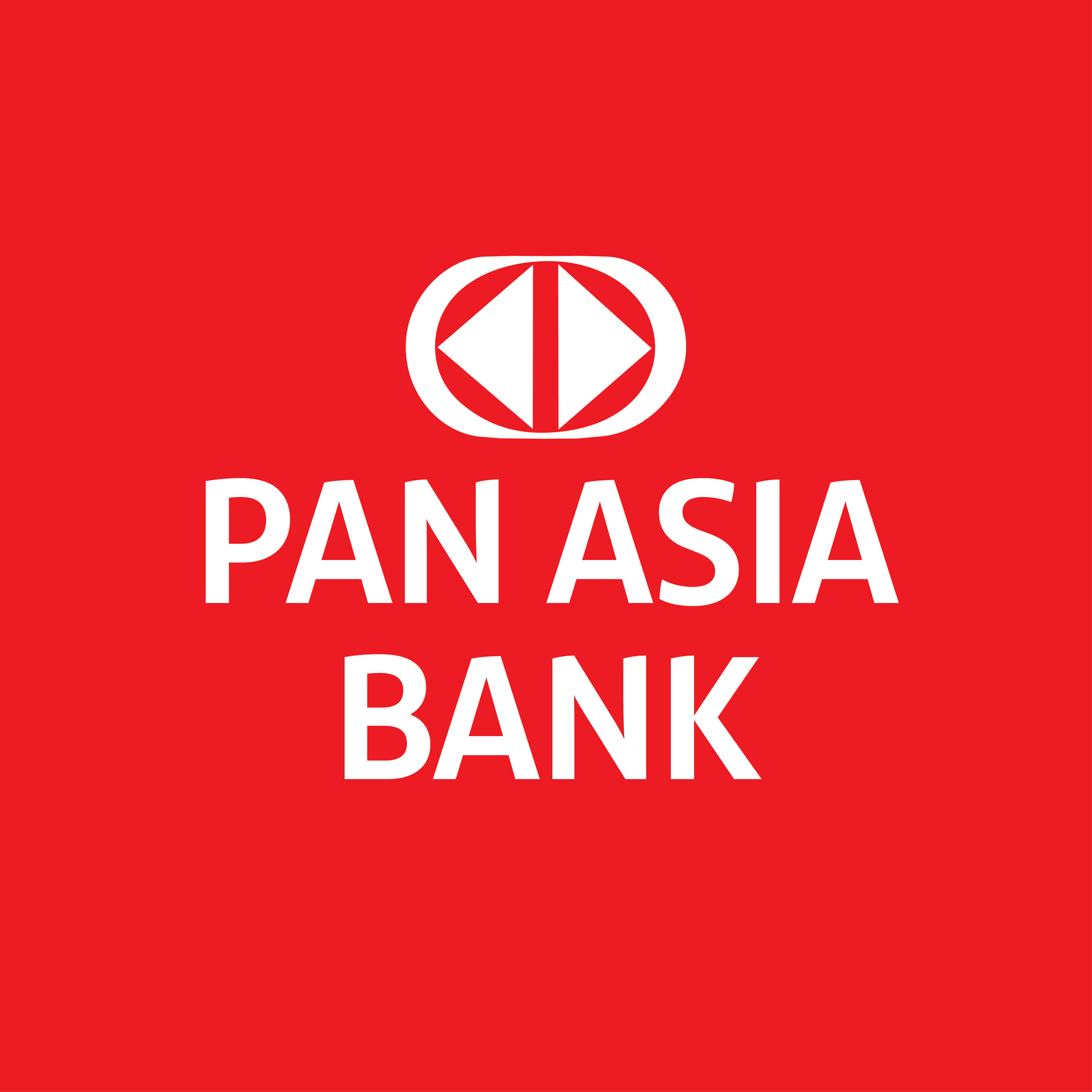
- Pan Asia Bank logo
- Company type: Public
- Traded as: CSE: PABC.N0000
- ISIN: LK0346N00003
- Industry: Financial services
- Founded: March 6, 1995; 31 years ago
- Headquarters: Kollupitiya, Colombo, Sri Lanka
- Number of locations: 85 branches (2022)
- Key people: S. B. Rangamuwa (Chairman); Aravinda Perera (Deputy chairman); Naleen Edirisinghe (Managing Director/CEO)
- Revenue: ▲LKR25.813 billion (2022)
- Operating income: ▼LKR8.606 billion (2022)
- Net income: ▼LKR2.001 billion (2022)
- Total assets: ▲LKR208.049 billion (2022)
- Total equity: ▲LKR20.617 billion (2022)
- Owners: Dhammika Perera (29.99%); Bansei Securities (15.00%); W. K. H. Wegapitiya (6.23%)
- Number of employees: ▲1,403 (2022)
- Website: www.pabcbank.com

Pan Asia Banking Corporation PLC is a public limited company incorporated in Sri Lanka. The bank currently has 85 branches across Sri Lanka. A public limited liability company incorporated in Sri Lanka on 6 March 1995 under the Companies Act No. 17 of 1982 and re-registered under the Companies Act No.07 of 2007. A licensed commercial bank under the banking Act No.30 of 1988 and listed in the Colombo Stock Exchange. PABC's major shareholder is Dhammika Perera. Fitch Rating BBB− (lka) - Outlook 'Stable'.
