= Nestlé Lanka =

Sri Lankan subsidiary of Nestlé

- Formerly: Nestlé Ceylon Company (1906-1980)
- Type: Private
- ISIN: LK0128N00005
- Industry: Food processing
- Founded: 1906; 120 years ago in Colombo
- Founder: Anglo-Swiss Condensed Milk Company
- Headquarters: 189, T. B. Jayah Mawatha, Colombo 10, Sri Lanka
- Area served: Worldwide
- Key people: Suresh Narayanan (Chairman); Joselito Avanceña (Managing Director)
- Products: Baby food; coffee; dairy products; breakfast cereals; confectionery; bottled water; ice cream; pet foods
- Revenue: ▲ Rs 73.707 billion (2022)
- Operating income: ▲ Rs 7.869 billion (2022)
- Net income: ▲ Rs 6.075 billion (2022)
- Total assets: ▲ Rs 46.894 billion (2022)
- Total equity: ▲ Rs 10.742 billion (2022)
- Parent: Nestlé
- Website: www.nestle.lk

Nestlé Lanka (Sinhala: නෙස්ලේ ලංකා පුද්ගලික සමාගම, romanized: neslē laṁkā pudgalika samāgama)(previously known as Nestlé Ceylon Company) and Nestlé Sri Lanka is a subsidiary of Nestlé, a Swiss based company. Nestlé's products include baby food, medical food, bottled water, breakfast cereals, coffee and tea. The company was founded by the Anglo-Swiss Condensed Milk Company in 1906 and incorporated under Nestlé Ceylon Company. Nestlé Lanka is Sri Lanka's largest food company by revenue, with Rs 36.355 billion in 2019. The whole company is controlled by the Nestlé Switzerland parent company. Nestlé S.A. owns over 90 per cent total shares. Nestlé Lanka PLC became the seventh most valuable brand in Sri Lanka worth approximately Rs 21 billion in 2017.

Nestlé Lanka was listed on the Colombo Stock Exchange in 1981. The company has 1,200 employees and 23,000 distributors, suppliers and farmers. The company was renamed in 1980 as Nestlé Lanka PLC before being listed on the Stock Exchange. The company was delisted from Colombo Stock Exchange on 9 August 2023.

== History ==
Nestlé Lanka was established in 1906 as Nestlé Ceylon Company one year after merging with Anglo-Swiss Condensed Milk Company in British Ceylon. The company was incorporated under Nestlé Ceylon Company to Nestlé Lanka PLC in 1980. Sri Lanka has been an agricultural-based country. British Empire helped boost agricultural production. The British government's first cocoa plant was introduced to Ceylon in early 1890. Early 20th-century raw cocoa was exported to Switzerland. Chocolate became popular government wanted to start the local chocolate market, in between this time Anglo-Swiss Condensed Milk Company established a branch in Sri Lanka in early 1906. Sri Lankan history Nestlé become most successful food company. Company brought numerous international brand such as Milo, Nescafé, Cerelac, KitKat and Maggi. Company-sponsored by local sports events and school sports tournaments. Nestlé Lanka PLC won numerous awards and become a number one company past hundred years. Post COVID-19 period Nestlé stock price drop 50% than previous year. Nestlé export most of their product such as Maggi Coconut Milk Nestomalt and Milo. Nestlé Lanka received permission from Securities and Exchange Commission of Sri Lanka to delist the company from Colombo Stock Exchange on 9 August 2023.

== Brands and products ==
Nestlé Lanka is the market leader in Sri Lanka food products with a presence in over 20 food categories such as tea, milk, chocolate, cereal and fast food amongst others with over 20 million local customers consumption.

Manufactured brands
Brand name	Product type
Cerelac	Baby food
Nangrow	Baby food
Lactogrow	
Nestlé Pure Life	Bottled water
Nesquik Cereal	Cereals
KitKat	Chocolate
Milkybar	Chocolate
Nescafé	Coffee
Nescafé 3 in 1	Coffee
Nescafé Classic	Coffee
Nescafé Gold	Coffee
Buitoni	Frozen food
Maggi	Culinary
Nido	Dairy
Carnation	Dairy
Nespray milk	Dairy
Nestlé a+	Dairy
Milkmaid	Dairy
Nestomalt	Energy food
Milo	Drinks
Nestea	Drinks
Nesquik	Drinks
Nespray	Drinks
Nestlé Professional	Drinks
Maggi	Food service
Resource	Healthcare nutrition
Nestlé Ice Cream	Ice cream
Häagen-Dazs	Ice cream
Dog Chow	Pet food
Cat Chow	Pet food

== See also ==
- List of food companies
- List of largest companies in Sri Lanka
