= Bairaha Farms =

Sri Lankan poultry processing company

Bairaha Farms PLC
- Logo of Bairaha Farms
- Company type: Public
- Traded as: CSE: BFL.N0000
- ISIN: LK0229N00001
- Industry: Food
- Founded: 1975; 51 years ago
- Headquarters: Colombo, Sri Lanka
- Key people: Reyaz Mihular (Chairman); Yakooth Naleem (Managing Director)
- Revenue: ▲LKR6,742 million (2022)
- Operating income: ▲LKR663 million (2022)
- Net income: ▲LKR765 million (2022)
- Total assets: ▲LKR6,201 million (2022)
- Total equity: ▲LKR4,785 million (2022)
- Owners: M. N. M. Yakooth (10.64%); M. N. M. Mubarak (10.38%); M. N. M. Kamil (10.02%)
- Number of employees: 991 (2022)
- Subsidiaries: See text
- Website: www.bairaha.com

Bairaha Farms PLC is a poultry processing company, headquartered in Colombo, Sri Lanka.

== History ==
Bairaha Farms was founded in 1975 by establishing its first large-scale poultry farm in Katana. The company went public in 1994 with an initial public offering. By 1987 Bairaha Farms was the largest broiler producer in Sri Lanka, controlling 45% of the market share. The company bought about 500 tons per year of soybean meal from Ceylon Grain Elevators. During the late 1990s, animal feed manufacturing in Sri Lanka was dominated by three companies. Bairaha Farms was one of them, operating together with Cargill. Bairaha Farms-Cargill joint venture controlled 10% of the animal feed market share and 10% and 30% market shares in layer day-old chicks and broiler day-old chicks.

Bairaha Farms built a new chicken farm in Anamaduwa in Puttalam District in 2010. The company signed an agreement with the Board of Investment of Sri Lanka and received a 10-year tax holiday for the project. The company planned to invest LKR120 million in the first year and LKR240 million in the second and third years. In return, Bairaha expected to raise chicken production by 20% in the first year and another 20% in the second year and 15% in the third year. Fortune GP Farms, a joint venture between Bairaha and Crysbro Group, won the bronze award in agriculture value added category at 2011 National Chamber of Exporters of Sri Lanka awards. Managing director Yakooth Naleem accepted the award at the ceremony.

== Operations ==
Bairaha Farms is one of the LMD 100 companies in Sri Lanka. LMD 100 is an annual list of listed companies in Sri Lanka, and Bairaha Farms ranks 99th in the 2020/21 edition of the list. Bairaha is the 66th most valuable brand in Sri Lanka in 2022. Brand Finance calculates the brand value of Bairaha to be LKR960 million, a 12% increase from the last year.

Bairaha appointed Reyaz Mihular as the chairman of the company in May 2022. Before his appointment, Mihular has been serving as an independent non-executive director on Bairaha's board of directors since January 2022. Mihular is also the managing partner of KPMG Sri Lanka and Maldives since 2012. The company upgraded its laboratory with microbiological facilities in 2022. The laboratory is equipped with PCR testing capabilities to test chicken and chicken meat. The company saw a 200% profit growth in the second quarter of 2022 led by joint venture profits and other operating income increases. Prices of chicken also soared during the quarter.

== Corporate social responsibility ==
Bairaha Farms was the winner of the Environmental Social Governance Initiative of the Year award at the FMCG Asia Awards in 2022. The company won the award for publishing a chicken recipe book in Braille. It was the first time such a book was published in Sri Lanka. The company also donated Braille books to all 18 schools for blind students in the country. The company provides school bags and stationery packs for schooling children of every employee of the company. The programme is named "Bairaha Help to Learn" and is organised for the fourth consecutive year in 2022. Nearly 600 students also received plotted plants in 2022.

== See also ==
- List of companies listed on the Colombo Stock Exchange
