= Perera & Sons =

Sri Lankan household bakery items selling vendor, food service restaurant chain

- Company type: Private
- Industry: Food and beverage
- Founded: 1902; 124 years ago
- Headquarters: Madinnagoda, Rajagiriya, Sri Lanka
- Number of locations: 200 (2024)
- Website: pereraandsons.com

Perera & Sons, also known as P & S, is a Sri Lankan household bakery items selling vendor and a relatively well known food outlet store in Sri Lanka. It is also the largest food service restaurant chain in Sri Lanka. Perera & Sons is registered as a private limited company, although the wording may depict it as a partnership business. As of 2024, Perera & Sons has approximately 180 outlets operating in 7 provinces across the island nation of Sri Lanka. The company earned the reputation as a Quick Service Restaurant facility service provider over the years.

== Corporate history ==
Perera & Sons has a legal personality and has limited liability attributed to it. The company's humble beginnings date back to 1902 when it commenced its business operations as a little bakery by K. A. Charles Perera from the remote southern village of Kodagoda. It quickly emerged as one of the most sought-after food restaurant chains in Sri Lanka, hence becoming a household name.

In 2022, it collaborated and joined hands with Nestlé Lanka with the intention to engage in corporate social responsibility towards the society and community by formulating a project taskforce to tackle logistical hurdles and challenges regarding plastic pollution in Sri Lanka. Perera and Sons committed to take part in the initiative to counter threats related to plastic pollution by collecting and recycling material of product items sold and consumed in the bakery chain's outlets across all parts of Sri Lanka.

In 2023, Perera and Sons set history as the first and only quick-service restaurant chain in Sri Lanka to have opened 200+ outlets in the country with the latest outlet was launched at Nuwara Eliya as it was inaugurated amidst a special ceremony attended by key stakeholders and senior management cadres.

Perera & Sons became the official title sponsor for the Hill Club Annual Open Ranking Tennis tournament for its 2023 edition. Perera and Sons for the second successive year in 2024, sponsored the Hill Club Annual Open Ranking Tennis tournament.

== Controversies ==
In January 2024, the organization faced a backlash when the Consumer Affairs Authority officials took action over a range of complaints received from walk-in customers about the safety and standards of certain food items including lamprais being sold at particular food outlets. The lamprais sold at one of Perera & Son's outlets were reportedly contaminated with bacteria, which made the foot unfit for consumption.

== See also ==
Sri Lankan cuisine
