= Majestic City =

- Location: Bambalapitiya, Sri Lanka
- Coordinates: 6.893888°N 79.854722°E
- Address: 10 Station Road, Bambalapitiya
- Opened: 4 April 1991; 35 years ago
- Developer: C T Land Development PLC
- Manager: R. Selvaskandan (Chairman); J. C. Page (Deputy Chairman/Managing Director)
- Owner: C T Land Development PLC
- Architect: Gemunu Fernando - Design Group Five International (Pvt) Ltd
- Num. of stores: 240
- Floor area: 23,000 m^{2} (250,000 sq ft)
- Floors: 5, 2 below ground
- Parking: 135 approx.
- Website: http://www.majesticcity.lk/
- Type: Public
- Traded as: CSE: CTLD.N0000
- ISIN: LK0175N00006
- Key people: Louis Page (Chairman); Joseph Page (Deputy chairman/Managing director)
- Revenue: ▼LKR146 million (2022)
- Operating income: ▼LKR4 million (2022)
- Net income: ▼LKR(16) million (2022)
- Total assets: LKR4,978 million (2022)
- Total equity: ▼LKR3,993 million (2022)
- Owner: C T Holdings PLC (67.9%)
- Parent: C T Holdings PLC

Majestic City, trading as C T Land Development PLC, is a seven-storey commercial and shopping complex, located in Bambalapitiya, a suburb of Colombo, near the Bambalapitiya Railway Station.

The complex is owned by C T Land Development PLC. The founding chairman of the complex was Albert A. Page. Majestic City incorporates a diverse range of shopping outlets (240), including a food court, supermarket, children's amusement centre, banks and the Majestic Cineplex.

== Construction ==
The complex was designed by Gemmu Fernando of the Design Group Five International (Pvt) Ltd and constructed by Tudawe Brothers Limited. Construction of the three-storey 13,000 m^{2} (140,000 sq ft) shopping complex, with 88 tenancies, developed around a central atrium was completed in 1991 and formally opened on 4 April.

The second phase of development, comprising a cinema, food court, amusement centre and additional tenancies commenced in May 1993 was opened on 4 December 1994. It was designed by Design Group Five International and constructed by Sanken Construction (Pvt) Ltd at a cost of Rs 171 million.

An LKR176 million renovation of the building was undertaken in 2008, which included modifications to the Galle Road entrance and the atrium, together with a refurbishment of the basement food court.

In 2010 the fifth level of the complex was refurbished, and three new cinemas were added, with the cinemas opening on 4 December that year.

In 2019 the owners of the centre announced that they would be commencing a Rs 450 million refurbishment of the complex, which is expected to be completed by June 2020.

=== Majestic Cineplex ===
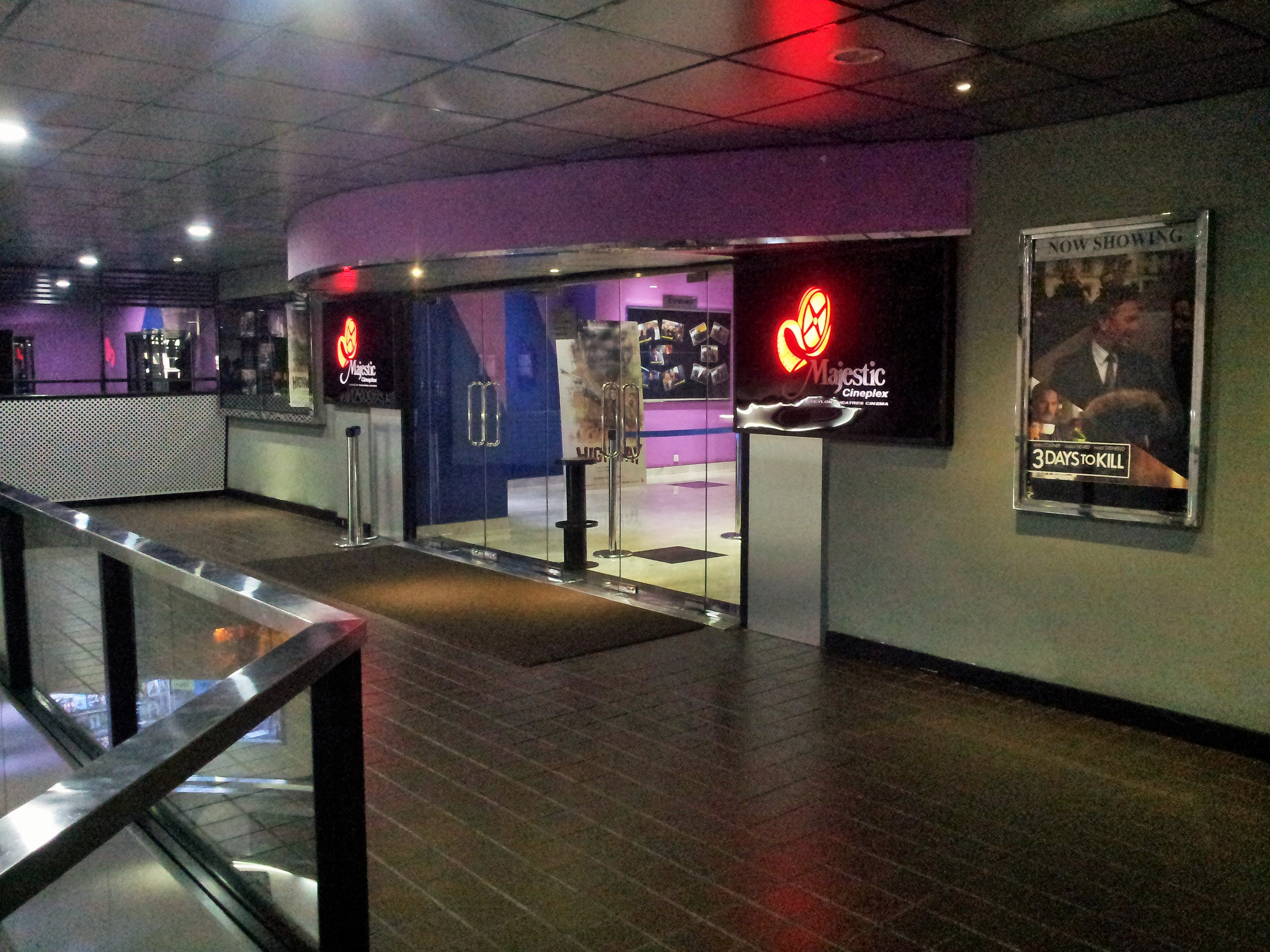
Majestic City Platinum Cinema

Majestic Cineplex includes four cinemas managed by Ceylon Theaters (Pvt) Ltd,

- MC – Platinum Cinema – 445 seats (located on level four, built in 1990 as a 2D cinema and refurbished/upgraded in 2013 to a 3D cinema using Dolby® 3D technology
- MC – Ultra Cinema – 150 seats (located on level five, built in 2012)
- MC – Gold Cinema – 50 seats (located on level five, built in 2012)
- MC – Superior 3D Cinema – 170 seats (located on level five, built in 2012. Sri Lanka's first 3D cinema)
