= Ministry of Investment Promotion =

Government ministry of Sri Lanka

Agency overview
- Jurisdiction: Government of Sri Lanka
- Annual budget: Rs .110,270 Billion
- Minister responsible: Dhammika Perera

The Ministry of Investment Promotion is the Sri Lankan government ministry.

== List of ministers ==
Minister of Investment Promotion of Sri Lanka

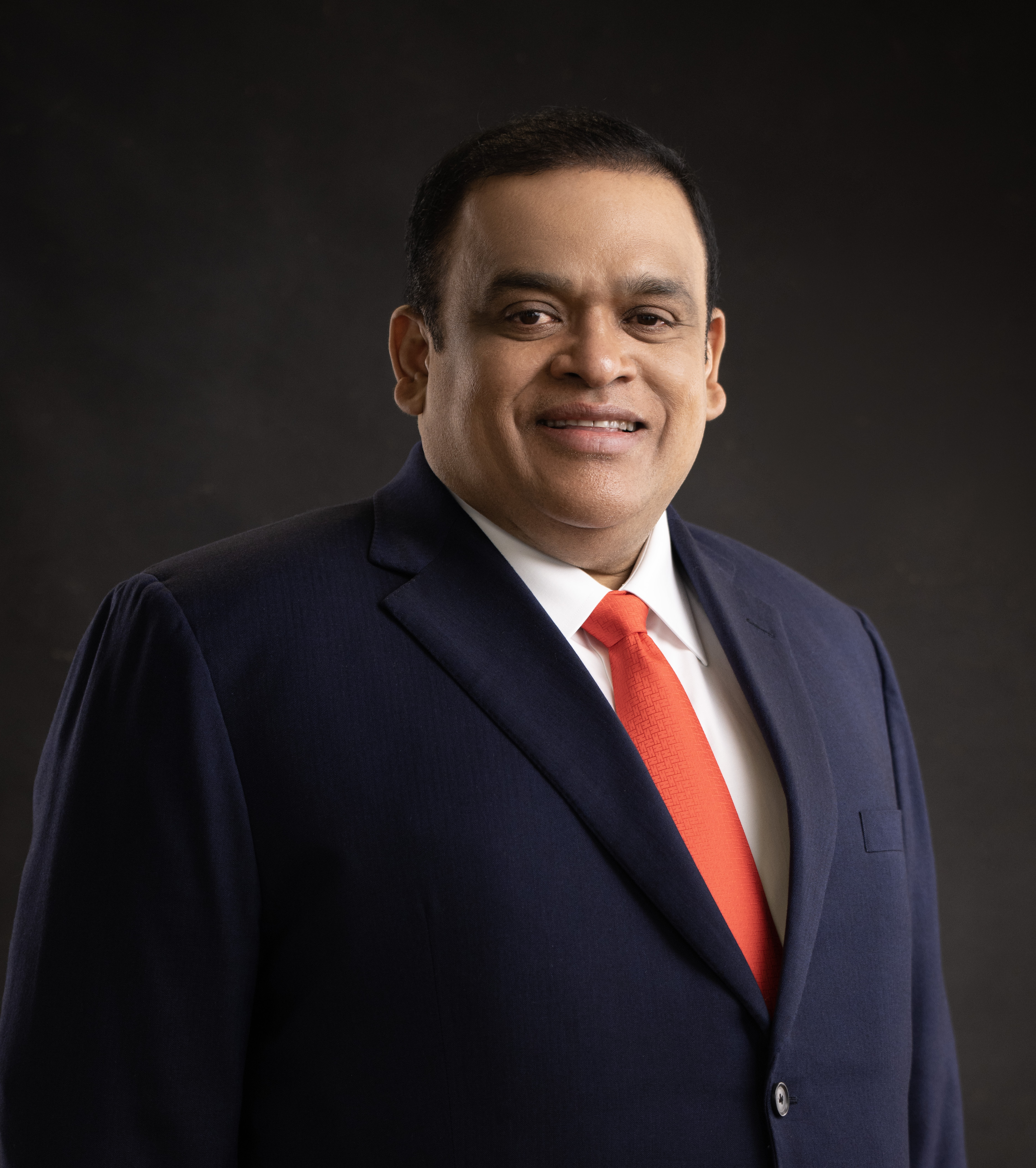
- Incumbent; Dhammika Perera since 24 June 2022
- Ministry of Investment Promotion
- Appointer: The president on advice of the prime minister

The minister of investment promotion is an appointment in the Cabinet of Sri Lanka.

Parties

Sri Lanka Freedom Party United National Party

Name	Portrait	Party	Tenure	President
Lakshman Yapa Abeywardena		Sri Lanka Freedom Party	28 January 2013 – Present	Mahinda Rajapaksa

== See also ==
- List of ministries of Sri Lanka
