= LAUGFS Holdings =

Sri Lankan conglomerate

LAUGFS Holdings Limited
- Logo since 2019
- Type: Private
- Industry: Conglomerate
- Founded: 1995; 31 years ago
- Founders: W. K. H. Wegapitiya; U. K. Thilak De Silva
- Area served: Sri Lanka; Bangladesh; United Arab Emirates
- Key people: Dr. W. K. H. Wegapitiya (Group Chairman); Mithila Wegapitiya (Group Executive Vice Chairman); Dhanusha Muthukumarana (Group Executive Director)
- Website: www.laugfs.lk//

LAUGFS Holdings Limited is a Sri Lankan conglomerate. founded in 1995, LAUGFS has operations in over 20 companies, both domestically and internationally. LAUGFS has an annual turnover exceeding US$300 million and is supported by a workforce of over 3,000 professionals.

LAUGFS is an acronym for Lanka Auto Gas Fuelling Systems. Initially established to serve the automotive, power, and energy sectors, the company has significantly expanded its operations beyond its original focus. Over the years, LAUGFS has diversified into a variety of industries, including leisure, retail, engineering, logistics, and pharmaceuticals.

== History ==
LAUGFS Holdings Limited, a prominent Sri Lankan conglomerate founded in 1995, has significantly expanded its presence across diverse industries since its inception. The company began with pioneering initiatives such as Gas Auto Lanka, Sri Lanka's first auto gas conversion business, and subsequently diversified into various sectors. In 2000, LAUGFS ventured into consumer food retail by launching the country’s first 24-hour supermarket in Havelock Town, marking the start of its diversification strategy. By 2001, LAUGFS had entered the domestic LPG industry and manufactured high-capacity LPG storage tanks, meeting global standards. The company continued its expansion into petroleum retailing in 2004 with LAUGFS Petroleum (Pvt) Ltd.

Throughout the years, LAUGFS expanded its portfolio to include sectors such as restaurants with the Jade restaurant chain in 2006, followed by entries into vehicle emission testing, lubricant production, and the leisure industry by 2014. Milestones include the IPO of LAUGFS Gas PLC in 2010 and the acquisition of international assets like Petredec Elpiji Ltd in Bangladesh in 2015, marking LAUGFS as the first Sri Lankan energy brand to go multinational. The company has also made significant contributions to renewable energy with projects like Sri Lanka's largest solar power project under LAUGFS Power in 2017.

By 2023, LAUGFS Supermarkets had expanded to 38 locations, and LAUGFS Eco Sri had established its 95th vehicle emission testing centre.

In 2025 Dhammika Perera acquired a 50% stake in Laugfs Holdings Ltd through his private vehicle, Vallibel Three (Pvt.) Ltd, buying 10.4% from W.K.H. Wegapitiya and 39.6% from U.K. Thilak De Silva, who resigned from the board of directors.

== Sectors ==
=== Power and energy ===
- LAUGFS Gas PLC, which entered the local LPG industry in 2001, has grown to provide LPG throughout Sri Lanka. The company operates a network of over 10,000 dealers and 30 distributors, serving domestic, industrial, and commercial needs. Its nationwide sales and distribution are supported by a fleet of LPG tankers and a storage and filling facility with a capacity of 30,000 MT.
- LAUGFS Terminals Limited, operates the largest LPG transshipment facility in South Asia, located at the Hambantota International Port, with a substantial storage capacity of 30,000 MT.
- LAUGFS Petroleum (Pvt) Ltd, founded in 2004 under LAUGFS Holdings, is a significant player in Sri Lanka's petroleum industry. With a growing network of fuel filling stations, LAUGFS Petroleum serves over 30,000 customers daily. The company was the first in Sri Lanka to introduce Near Field Communication (NFC) technology for fuel retailing to corporate clients, currently supporting over 300 companies with 25,000 NFC cards. LAUGFS Petroleum's fuel stations offer nitrogen and digital air services, lubricants, domestic gas cylinders and accessories, and car care items. Notably, the company has established the nation’s first solar-powered fuel filling stations.
- LAUGFS Lubricants Limited, is the only Sri Lankan company to launch its own brand of lubricants for automotive and industrial applications. Since its market debut in July 2008, LAUGFS Lubricants has established a significant presence in a sector typically dominated by multinational corporations. The company offers lubricants that are locally blended. LAUGFS Lubricants provides a range of products, including automotive and industrial lubricants formulated from base oils and additives. It is the first Sri Lankan brand to receive Original Equipment Manufacturer (OEM) approvals from manufacturers such as Volvo, Renault, and Porsche, and the only company in Sri Lanka to hold an American Petroleum Institute (API) licence. The company operates a blending plant and has an in-house research and development facility, allowing it to develop engine oils tailored to Sri Lanka’s specific climatic and road conditions. LAUGFS Lubricants is ISO 17025:2017 and ISO 9001:2015 certified.
- LAUGFS Power PLC is involved in the development of solar, hydro, and wind power projects in Sri Lanka. A subsidiary of the LAUGFS Group, the company has established the nation’s largest solar power plant and three mini-hydro plants, and has initiated multiple solar projects.

=== Consumer Retail ===
LAUGFS Supermarkets (Pvt) Ltd.

Established in 2000, LAUGFS Supermarkets (Pvt) Ltd. introduced Sri Lanka's first 24-hour retail concept. The company integrates convenience stores with fuel retail outlets and offers 24-hour pharmacy services. LAUGFS Supermarkets attracts over 800,000 regular customers each month. The company operates 38 outlets. LAUGFS Super outlets feature the Crimson Bakery, a Salad Bar, and a selection of imported wines.

LAUGFS International (Pvt) Ltd.

Established in 2014, LAUGFS International (Pvt) Ltd. is the trading arm of LAUGFS Holdings. The company holds authorised agency rights for brands such as Yamaha, Airman, Denso, and Fujitsu. LAUGFS International offers a range of products including Yamaha petrol and diesel generators, water pumps, and multipurpose engines. The company is also the authorised dealer for Airman products and Denso automotive parts. LAUGFS International operates through a network of trade channels, retail outlets, and online stores.

LAUGFS Restaurants (Pvt) Ltd.

Established in 2006, LAUGFS Restaurants (Pvt) Ltd. operates Jade Restaurants, specialising in Chinese cuisine. Located in Nugegoda and Maharagama, Sri Lanka, Jade Restaurants offer in-house dining, takeaway options, and delivery services. The restaurants also provide a 'Bring Your Own Bottle' (BYOB) option.

=== Industrial / Manufacturing ===
LAUGFS Engineering (Pvt.) Ltd.

Founded in 2001, LAUGFS Engineering (Pvt.) Ltd. is a subsidiary of LAUGFS Holdings Limited. The company holds certifications including CIDA EM1, C2, and ISO 9001:2015, and offers a range of engineering services. Specialising in the fabrication of LPG pressure vessels and storage tanks, LAUGFS Engineering provides services such as assembly of pressure vessels, construction of storage tanks, and heavy construction work. The company also offers ancillary services like powder coating, painting, and sandblasting. LAUGFS Engineering operates a facility in Mabima with a sophisticated powder coating workshop.

LAUGFS Corporation (Rubber) Ltd.

Established in 2008, LAUGFS Corporation (Rubber) Ltd. produces industrial tyres. The company operates a large tyre manufacturing facility. It produces a range of tyres, including solid, press-on, resilient, and skid-steer types, adhering to international standards. LAUGFS Rubber's products are exported to over 40 countries.

LAUGFS Salt and Chemicals Ltd.

- LAUGFS Salt and Chemicals Ltd., located on a 100-acre site in Chithragala, Hambantota, produces premium deep-sea salt and a variety of value-added salt products. One of its flagship products, Magam Table Salt, is harvested from deep seabeds. LAUGFS Salt and Chemicals also offers the Rasa Musu brand of salt. The company uses Geomembrane Sheets in salt harvesting to enhance purity and production capabilities.

=== Services ===
- LAUGFS Eco Sri Limited, founded in 2008 and accredited by the Board of Investment (BOI), specialises in Vehicle Emission Testing (VET) certifications in Sri Lanka. It complies with the mandatory Vehicle Emission Testing program mandated by the Department of Motor Traffic (DMT), where all registered vehicles undergo emissions testing to obtain their annual revenue licence. The company is ISO 9001 certified.
- LAUGFS Car Care, established in 2000 as a subsidiary of LAUGFS Lubricants Ltd., provides car care and lubricants in Sri Lanka. Specialising in servicing hybrid and electric vehicles, LAUGFS Car Care's Hybrid Centres feature technology tailored to these vehicles' specific needs. Integrated Lube Shops within the service centres offer a range of lubricants and car care products.

=== Logistics ===
- LAUGFS Maritime Services (Pvt) Ltd, established in 2014, is a ship owning and management company in Sri Lanka. It focuses on regional transportation and logistics solutions for Liquefied Petroleum Gas (LPG) and holds a CAP Rating One from the Lloyd’s Registry of Shipping. Initially supporting LAUGFS Gas PLC, the company's fleet now includes vessels like the Gas Challenger, Gas Success, and Gas Courage.

=== Pharmaceutical Manufacturing ===
- LAUGFS Life Sciences (Pvt) Limited, a subsidiary of LAUGFS Holdings Ltd., operates a manufacturing facility in Koggala, producing intravenous products, particularly large volume parenteral solutions. Using advanced Form-Fill-Seal technology, the facility manufactures approximately 25 brands of IV fluids in PP Bags under controlled conditions.

== Awards and accolades ==
LAUGFS Group has received numerous awards and accolades over the years. These include honors such as the Sri Lankan Entrepreneur of the Year Awards, National Business Excellence Awards, and CA Annual Report Awards, among others.

Recognitions include the Sri Lankan Entrepreneur of the Year Awards in 2006 and 2012, as well as the Best Corporate Citizen Award in 2014 and 2015. LAUGFS Gas PLC, a subsidiary, has consistently received Gold Awards in the Power & Energy Sector at the CA Annual Report Awards from 2013 to 2019.

Additionally, LAUGFS Corporation (Rubber) Ltd has received the Gold Award in the Extra Large Category at the NCE Export Awards in both 2021 and 2022. In 2022, it was also honored as the Most Outstanding Exporter Overall.
