= Vallibel Finance =

Sri Lankan non-banking financial company

Vallibel Finance PLC
- Logo of Vallibel Finance
- Formerly: The Rupee Finance Company (1974-2005)
- Company type: Public
- Traded as: CSE: VFIN.N0000
- ISIN: LK0364N00006
- Industry: Financial services
- Founded: September 5, 1974; 51 years ago
- Headquarters: Colombo, Sri Lanka
- Number of locations: 58 (2023)
- Key people: K. D. A. Perera (Chairman); S. B. Rangamuwa (Managing Director)
- Revenue: ▲LKR16.689 billion (2023)
- Operating income: ▼LKR5.675 billion (2023)
- Net income: ▼LKR1.327 billion (2023)
- Total assets: ▲LKR84.352 billion (2023)
- Total equity: ▲LKR11.058 billion (2022)
- Owners: Vallibel Investments (51.44%); Dhammika Perera (21.43%); K. D. A. Perera (3.62%)
- Number of employees: ▼1,220 (2023)
- Parent: Vallibel Investments
- Subsidiaries: Vallibel Properties
- Rating: Lanka Rating Agency: BBB+
- Website: www.vallibelfinance.com

Vallibel Finance PLC is a non-banking financial company in Sri Lanka. Vallibel Finance was incorporated in 1974 as The Rupee Finance Company. Dhammika Perera acquired the company in 2005 and was renamed Vallibel Finance. After an initial public offering, the company was listed on the Colombo Stock Exchange in 2010. Vallibel Finance joined the LankaPay electronic fund transfer network in 2014. In 2020, the company signed an agreement with the Board of Investment of Sri Lanka to build a 16-storey office complex in Kollupitiya. Vallibel Finance is one of the LMD 100 companies in Sri Lanka. Vallibel Finance is also ranked amongst the 100 most valuable brands in Sri Lanka in 2022.

== History ==
The company was incorporated as The Rupee Finance Company Limited, a small family-owned business in 1974. The company was converted into a public company in 1989. Dhammika Perera acquired the company in 2005 and was renamed Vallibel Finance. On 31 March 2010, Vallibel Finance's initial public offering was oversubscribed on its opening day. Subsequently, the company was listed on the Colombo Stock Exchange in April 2010. In 2011, Vallibel Finance moved its headquarters to a new location in Kollupitiya, Colombo. Vallibel Finance replaced Fitch with RAM as the company's rating agency in April 2013. RAM Ratings assigned a BB+ rating to Vallibel Finance. While withdrawing its rating, Fitch affirmed its long-term BB-(lka) rating.

Vallibel Finance joined the LankaPay electronic fund transfer network in 2014. In 2016, the company received the accolade for one of fifty Best Employer's Brands in Sri Lanka. At the time, Vallibel Finance employed nearly 700 employees. The company was named the most respected financial company in 2017 by LMD magazine. The company also ranked 22nd on the overall list. Vallibel Finance signed an agreement with the Board of Investment of Sri Lanka to build a 16-storey office complex in Kollupitiya in 2020. The project was valued at US$8.1 million and is expected to finish in 18 months.

== Operations ==
Vallibel Finance is one of the LMD 100 companies in Sri Lanka. LMD 100 is an annual list of publicly traded companies in Sri Lanka by revenue. In 2022, Vallibel Finance was placed 78th on the list, a seven-position ranking slide from the previous year. Vallibel Finance is also one of the 100 most valuable brands in Sri Lanka. Brand Finance estimated the brand value of Vallibel Finance to be LKR1,283 million in 2022, ranking 56th on the list. During the COVID-19 pandemic, the company donated two ventilators to Kurunegala Teaching Hospital in 2010. The ventilators cost LKR10 million. Lanka Rating Agency assigned the rating of BBB+ to Vallibel Finance in February 2023. The credit outlook was adjudged as negative. The company's strong presence in the market and the prevailing economic condition in the country were cited as the rationale for the rating.

== Finances ==
Ten-year financial summary
Year	Revenue LKR (mns)	Profit before tax LKR (mns)	Profit after tax LKR (mns)	Assets LKR (mns)	Earnings per share LKR
2023	16,704	2,763	1,340	82,324	5.69
2022	12,066	4,778	2,912	77,690	12.37
2021	9,470	2,859	1,728	55,225	7.34
2020	9,695	2,442	1,253	51,424	5.32
2019	8,725	2,286	1,129	47,660	5.09
2018	6,929	1,894	1,019	38,406	5.90
2017	5,115	1,324	726	30,685	4.37
2016	3,468	912	513	22,767	3.09
2015	2,896	633	373	16,894	2.24
2014	2,571	489	304	12,579	1.83

Source: Annual Report, 2022/23 (pp. 314–317)

== See also ==
- List of companies listed on the Colombo Stock Exchange
