= Ceylon Grain Elevators =

Animal feed manufacturing company in Sri Lanka

Ceylon Grain Elevators PLC
- Logo of Ceylon Grain Elevators
- Company type: Public
- Traded as: CSE: GRAN.N0000
- ISIN: LK0029N00005
- Industry: Animal feed
- Founded: 1982; 44 years ago
- Headquarters: Colombo, Sri Lanka
- Key people: Wickrema Senaka Weerasooria (Chairman); Cheng Chih Kwong (Chief Executive Officer)
- Revenue: ▼LKR17,888 million (2022)
- Operating income: ▲LKR5,258 million (2022)
- Net income: ▼LKR1,017 million (2022)
- Total assets: ▼LKR15,344 million (2022)
- Total equity: ▲LKR10,969 million (2022)
- Owners: Prima Limited, Singapore (45.45%); Employees' Provident Fund (8.92%); Supra Limited, Hong Kong (8.63%)
- Number of employees: ▲1,472 (2022)
- Parent: Prima Limited, Singapore
- Subsidiaries: See text

Ceylon Grain Elevators PLC is an animal feed manufacturing company in Sri Lanka. The company was incorporated in 1982 as a result of an agreement between the Government of Sri Lanka and Prima Limited of Singapore. The company was listed on the Colombo Stock Exchange in 1984. Singapore-based, Prima Limited holds a controlling stake in the company's stocks. Ceylon Grain Elevators is part of the Prima Group in Sri Lanka. The company is ranked 50th in LMD 100, an annual list of listed companies in Sri Lanka by revenue.

== History ==
Ceylon Grain Elevators were incorporated in 1982 by an agreement between the Government of Sri Lanka and Prima Limited of Singapore. In 1984, the company was listed on the Colombo Stock Exchange. The company became the largest company by market capitalisation on 17 February 1993. Breeder Farm Project in Kosgama commenced operations of day-old chicks in 1987 and The Three Acre Farms was acquired in 1992. Farms in Bulathsinhala and Halwathura were acquired by the company in 1996. In 2006, the company invested in Prima Management Services, an associated company of Ceylon Grain Elevators, which provides ITC solutions. In 2017, the company acquired a poultry processing plant for LKR272 million. The transaction was carried out with a related-party, Ceylon Agro-Industries, of Ceylon Grain Elevators.

During the late 1990s, three companies dominated animal feed manufacturing in Sri Lanka. Those were Ceylon Grain Elevators, Gold Coin Feed Mills, and Bairaha-Cargill joint operation. Ceylon Grain Elevators were the market leader in feed and chick production. Even though the company controlled 80% of the market share in 1993, with the entrance of Gold Coin and Cargill, it has dropped to 65%. Ceylon Federation of Labour raised concerns over the Employees' Provident Fund investing in the company after the Employees' Provident Fund incurred a LKR12 billion loss. Senak Weerasooria was appointed as the chairman of Ceylon Grain Elevators and Three Acre Farms in 2015.

== Operations ==
During the Sri Lankan economic crisis, the company is facing substantial losses due to the depreciation of the Sri Lankan rupee. The company estimated it would lose LKR2.57 billion in 2022. The company's retail sales of processed chicken would effect due to the closure of small and medium scaled restaurants, which account for 50% of its sales. Ceylon Grain Elevators benefited from the supply-demand mismatch of poultry products after the COVID-19 pandemic lockdown in September 2020. During the lockdown, the demand for poultry products declined. However, sooner than anticipated recovery created higher prices for poultry products. Ban on cattle slaughter by the Sri Lankan government boosted the stock prices of poultry-producing listed companies in the Colombo Stock Exchange, Bairaha Farms, Ceylon Grain Elevators and its subsidiary Three Acre Farms.

=== Prima Group ===
Prima Ceylon is a fellow subsidiary of Ceylon Grain Elevators under the parent company of Singapore-based, Prima Limited. Prima Ceylon is the first foreign direct investment after the economic liberalization in 1977. Prima Ceylon celebrated its 40th anniversary in 2019. Prima Ceylon Machinery Ltd, Ceylon Agro Industries, Prima Land and Prima Management Services are the other members of the Prima Group in Sri Lanka. Brand Finance estimated brand name, Prima's value to be LKR2,233 million in 2019.

=== Controversies ===
Ceylon Grain Elevators were suspended from trading on the Colombo Stock Exchange in July 1998 over selling poultry feed to local vendors. Ceylon Grain Elevators agreed to pay the Government of Sri Lanka LKR115 million as part of the out-of-court settlement agreement in 2012. Sri Lanka Customs fined the company for LKR1.17 billion alleging the company violated the customs law. The two parties agreed to a settlement after negotiations, without the company conceding any legal liability.

== Subsidiaries ==
Subsidiary	Holding	Fair value/cost LKR (mns)	Activity
Three Acre Farms PLC (TAF)	57.21%	1,680	Operating farms
Millennium Multibreeder Farms (Pvt) Ltd	A wholly owned subsidiary of TAF		Operating farms
Ceylon Pioneer Poultry Breeders Ltd	A wholly owned subsidiary of TAF		Renting of farm operation
Ceylon Livestock and Agro-business Services (Pvt) Ltd	100%	3	Import and sale of poultry equipment
Ceylon Warehouse Complex (Pvt) Ltd	100%	150	Provide warehouse facilities
Ceylon Aquatech (Pvt) Ltd	100%	60	Renting of farm operation
Prima Management Services (Pvt) Ltd	33% (Associate company)	29.524	ICT services

Source: Annual Report, 2022 (p. 97, 122)

== See also ==
- List of companies listed on the Colombo Stock Exchange
