= Cargills Square =

Shopping mall in Sri Lanka

- Location: Jaffna, Sri Lanka
- Coordinates: 9°39′55.20″N 80°00′49.60″E
- Address: 420 Hospital Street
- Opened: 2013
- Developer: Cargills Ceylon PLC
- Manager: Cargills Ceylon PLC
- Owner: Cargills Ceylon PLC
- Architect: MMGS Architects
- Floor area: 74,000 sq ft (6,900 m^{2})
- Floors: 4

Cargills Square is a shopping mall in the city of Jaffna in northern Sri Lanka. The mall is located in the heart of the city at the junction of Hospital Street and Mahathma Gandhi Road, opposite Jaffna Hospital. Work on the Rs.500 million shopping and entertainment complex started in September 2011. The mall opened in the last quarter of 2013. The mall was designed by the Colombo based MMGS Architects.

As well as a Cargills Food City supermarket, the 74,000 sq ft (6,900 m^{2}) mall contains a KFC restaurant, a three screen cineplex, food court, bank, a Pizza Hut restaurant, a range of shops and a basement car park. The cineplex has seating for 1,200 people and is managed by C T Holdings (formerly known as the Ceylon Theatres Group), Cargills' parent company.
