= All Share Price Index =

Stock index of the Colombo Stock Exchange

The All Share Price Index is one of the principal stock indices of the Colombo Stock Exchange in Sri Lanka. ASPI measures the movement of share prices of all listed companies. It is based on market capitalisation. Weighting of shares is conducted in proportion to the issued ordinary capital of the listed companies, valued at current market price (i.e. market capitalisation). The base year is 1985, and the base value of the index is 100. This is the longest and the broadest measure of the Sri Lankan Stock market.

== Annual returns ==
The following table shows the annual development of the ASPI since 1993.

Year	Closing level	Change in points	Change in %
1993	974.24		
1994	986.73	12.49	1.28
1995	663.73	−323.00	−32.73
1996	602.97	−60.76	−9.15
1997	702.20	99.23	16.46
1998	597.30	−104.90	−14.94
1999	572.50	−24.80	−4.15
2000	447.58	−124.92	−21.82
2001	621.04	171.56	38.76
2002	815.11	194.07	31.25
2003	1,062.11	247.00	30.30
2004	1,506.89	444.78	41.88
2005	1,922.21	415.32	27.56
2006	2,722.36	800.15	41.63
2007	2,540.99	−181.37	−6.66
2008	1,503.02	−1,037.97	−40.85
2009	3,385.55	1,882.53	125.25
2010	6,635.87	3,250.32	96.01
2011	6,074.42	−561.45	−8.46
2012	5,643.00	−431.42	−7.10
2013	5,912.78	269.78	4.78
2014	7,298.95	1,386.17	23.44
2015	6,894.50	−404.45	−5.54
2016	6,228.26	−666.24	−9.66
2017	6,369.26	141.00	2.26
2018	6,052.37	−316.89	−4.98
2019	6,129.21	76.84	1.27
2020	6,774.22	645.01	10.52
2021	12,226.01	5,451.79	80.48
2022	8,502.49	-3,723.52	-30.46
2023	10,654.16	2,151.67	25.31
2024	15,944.61	5,290.45	49.66

== Record values ==
- Intraday: 13,593.04 points on 18 January 2022
- Closing: 13,462.39 points on 19 January 2022
