= List of largest companies in Sri Lanka =

This article lists the largest companies in Sri Lanka terms of their revenue, net profit and total assets, according to the local business magazine LMD.

== 2024/2025 ==
LMD 100, dubbed as "Sri Lanka's Fortune 500", annually lists the leading 100 quoted companies in Sri Lanka. Only the top 10 companies are listed below. All revenue figures reported before the financial year ending 2025.

Rank	Name	Financial statistics in billions of LKR				Industry
Rank	Name	Revenue	Profit	Assets	Shareholders Funds	Industry
1	Hayleys PLC	492.2	22.5	510.6	93.1	Conglomerate
▲2	LOLC Holdings	339.9	41	2,029.6	342.6	Banking
▲3	Carson Cumberbatch	323.9	34.4	313.5	90.6	Beverage
▲4	Bukit Darah	323.6	34.1	294.3	65.9	Beverage
5	John Keells Holdings	317.3	6.9	845.9	399	Conglomerate
▲6	Lanka IOC	276.2	11.1	118.7	82.6	Energy
▼7	Commercial Bank of Ceylon	274.9	55.6	2,875.9	281.1	Banking
▲8	CT Holdings	242.7	7.2	146.6	32.6	Retail
▲9	Cargills (Ceylon)	241.8	7.2	135.9	35.4	Retail
▼10	Hatton National Bank	228.9	44.8	2,209.1	261.3	Banking

== 2023/2024 ==
LMD 100, dubbed as "Sri Lanka's Fortune 500", annually lists the leading 100 quoted companies in Sri Lanka. Only the top 10 companies are listed below. All revenue figures reported before the financial year ending 2024.

Rank	Name	Financial statistics in billions of LKR				Industry
Rank	Name	Revenue	Profit	Assets	Market Cap.	Industry
▲1	Hayleys PLC	436.8	14.8	446.3	61.6	Conglomerate
▲2	Commercial Bank of Ceylon	341.6	21.9	2,655.6	124.3	Banking
3	LOLC Holdings	337.7	21.8	1,739.7	188.9	Conglomerate
▲4	Hatton National Bank	336.6	23.6	2,047.0	75.6	Banking
▲5	John Keells Holdings	280.8	12.1	771.2	290.8	Conglomerate
▼6	Carson Cumberbatch	277.1	22.3	287.8	50.9	Conglomerate
▼7	Bukit Darah	277.0	22.2	275.9	41.5	Beverage
▼8	Lanka IOC	263.6	13.9	101.8	62.2	Energy
▲9	Sampath Bank	236.5	17.9	1,587.4	82.7	Banking
▲10	CT Holdings	224.3	6.2	143.5	52.7	Retail

== See also ==
- List of companies of Sri Lanka
- List of government-owned companies of Sri Lanka
- List of largest public companies in Sri Lanka
- List of Sri Lankan public corporations by market capitalisation
