= Chittampalam Abraham Gardiner =

Ceylon Tamil businessman

Senator Sir Chittampalam A. Gardiner Kt KSS KSG

Member of the Senate of Ceylon

Personal details
- Born: 6 January 1899
- Died: December 1960 (aged 60–61)
- Occupation: Businessman
- Ethnicity: Ceylon Tamil

Sir Chittampalam Abraham Gardiner (6 January 1899 – December 1960) was a Ceylon Tamil businessman and member of the Senate of Ceylon.

== Early life and family ==
Gardiner was born on 6 January 1899. He was the son of Samuel Vairamuttu Gardiner and Salomapillai Bastiampillai. The Gardiner family were originally from Achchuvely and Manipay in northern Ceylon but later moved to Colombo.

Gardiner married Angeline Casie Chetty, daughter of Aloysius Mount Carmel Casie Chetty. They had an adopted son, Cyril Aloysius.

== Career ==
Gardiner studied law before entering business. He pioneered the cinema business in Ceylon and established The Ceylon Theatres Limited, which is now one of Sri Lanka's largest conglomerates, on 29 September 1928. He controlled several leading businesses in Colombo and had interests in others including Cargills and Millers.

Gardiner was made a Knight of St. Sylvester in 1947 for his services to the Roman Catholic Church. He was also a Knight of St. Gregory. He was appointed to the Senate of Ceylon in 1947. He was knighted in the 1951 New Year Honours.

Gardiner was a Rotarian and made a number of large charitable endowments. He was a keen horse owner, his horse won the Governor's Cup in 1947. He died in December 1960.

Parson's Road, the site of Regal Theatre, Ceylon Theatres' first cinema, was renamed Sir Chittampalam A. Gardiner Mawatha.
