= Empire, Colombo =

Empire
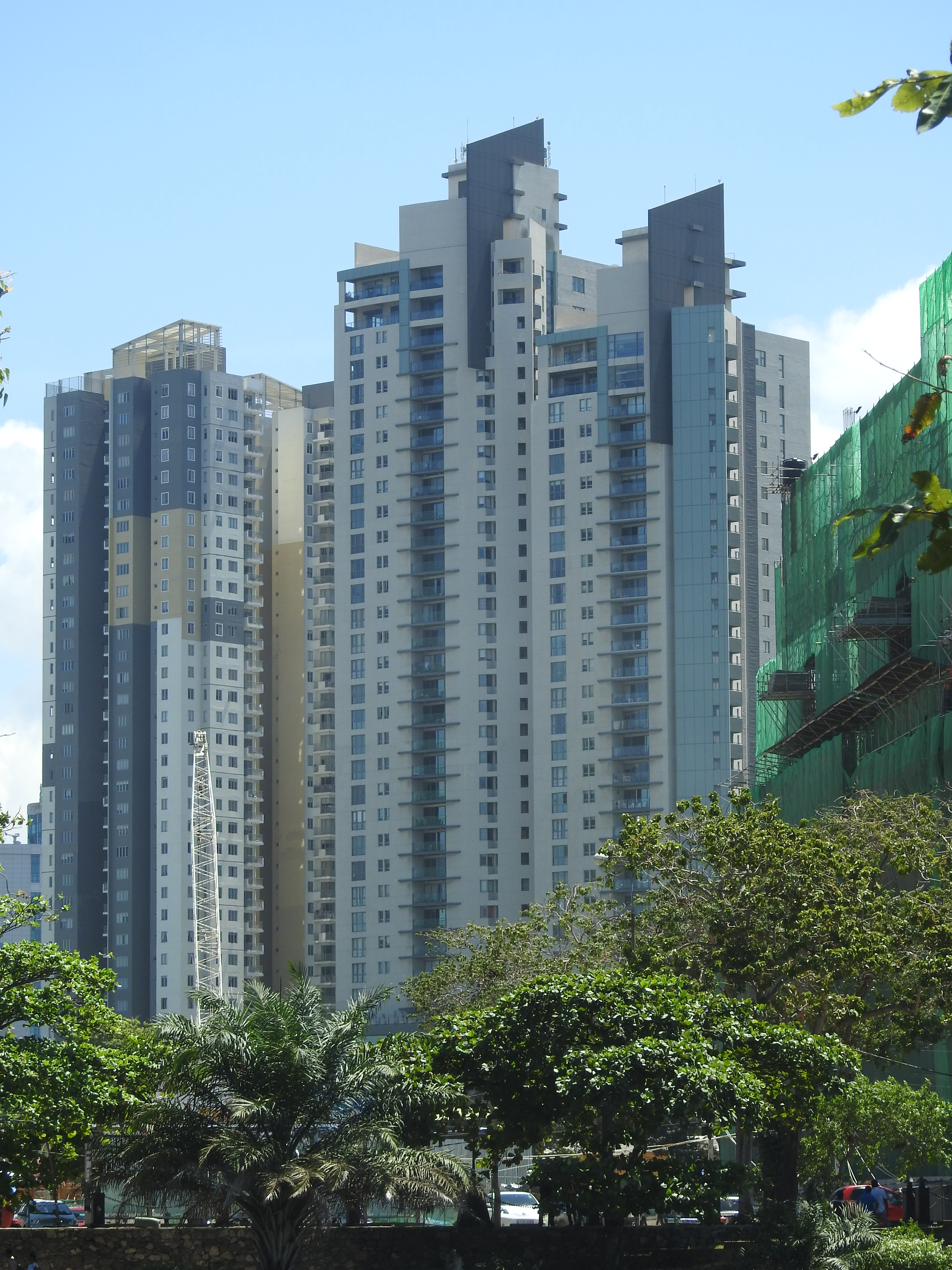
- The twin tower of the Empire (right).
- Interactive map of the Empire area

General information
- Status: Completed
- Location: Colombo, Sri Lanka
- Coordinates: 06°55′07″N 79°51′30″E
- Completed: 2009; 17 years ago
- Cost: US$ 24 million
- Owner: C T Holdings

Height
- Height: 131 m (430 ft)

Technical details
- Floor count: 39

Design and construction
- Architecture firm: Design Consortium
- Developer: Ceylon Theatres Limited

The Empire is a residential complex consisting of two identical towers of 33 and 37 floors. The towers consist of a total of 104 apartments, including four penthouses with floor space ranging from 2,028 square feet (188.4 m^{2}) to around 4,000 square feet (370 m^{2}). The 131 m (430 ft) towers are built on a 1.03-acre site where the old Empire Theatre once stood.

== See also ==
- List of tallest structures in Sri Lanka
