= Central Finance Company =

Sri Lankan non-banking financial company

Central Finance Company PLC
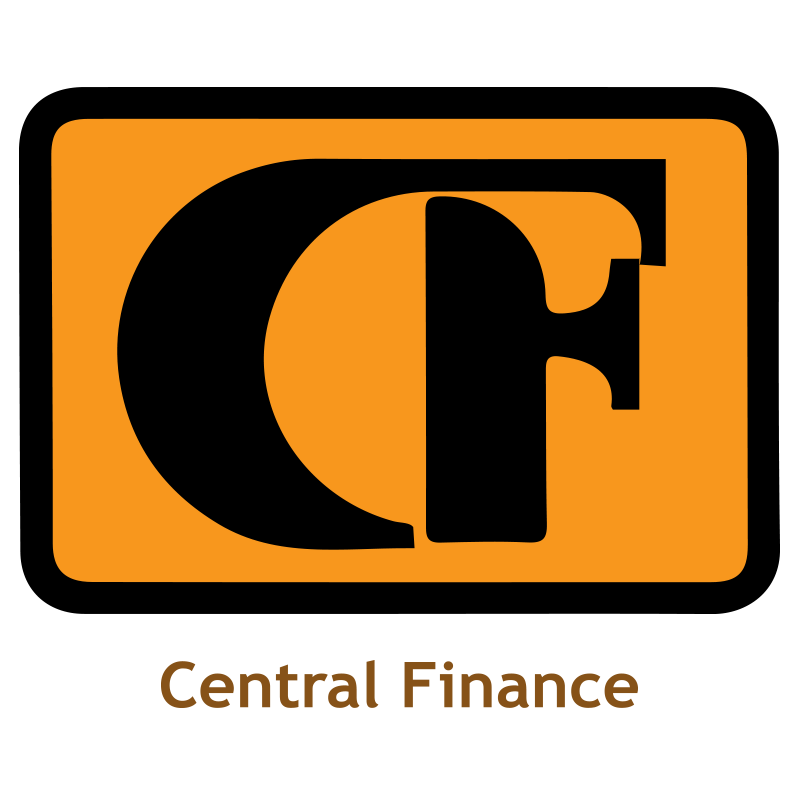
- Logo of Central Finance Company
- Trade name: CF
- Type: Public
- Traded as: CSE: CFIN.N0000
- ISIN: LK0023N00008
- Industry: Financial services
- Founded: December 5, 1957; 68 years ago in Kandy, Sri Lanka
- Founder: Chandra Wijenaike
- Headquarters: Kandy, Sri Lanka
- Number of locations: 108 (2026)
- Key people: A. D. B. Talwatte (Chairman); E. H. Wijenaike (Managing Director)
- Revenue: ▼LKR24.474 billion (2023)
- Operating income: ▲LKR16.806 billion (2023)
- Net income: ▲LKR7.559 billion (2023)
- Total assets: ▼LKR106.728 billion (2023)
- Total equity: ▲LKR61.446 billion (2023)
- Owners: Corporate Services (Pvt) Ltd (16.11%); E. H. Wijenaike (15.41%); Employees' Provident Fund (10.74%)
- Number of employees: ▲2,000+ (2026)
- Subsidiaries: Central Industries PLC; CF Insurance Brokers (Pvt) Ltd; Nations Trust Bank PLC; Kandy Private Hospitals Ltd; Dehigama Hotels Company Ltd Etc.
- Rating: Fitch: A-(lka)
- Website: cf.lk

Central Finance Company PLC is one of the oldest non-bank financial institutions (NBFIs) in Sri Lanka having founded in 1957. The company is listed on the Colombo Stock Exchange in 1969. Brand Finance ranked the company the 28th most valuable brand in Sri Lanka for the year 2021. Central Finance Company was ranked 44th in the LMD 100 for the fiscal year 2019/20 by LMD.

== Mission ==
Central Finance states their mission is to, "be the leader in our industry, conducting business with responsibility, using our expertise in helping customers grow and prosper whilst creating lasting value for our shareholders."

== Vision ==
Central Finance aims to be a preferred partner for progressive customers in delivering innovative financial solutions.

== History ==
Central Finance Company was founded in 1957 in Kandy by Chandra Wijenaike. The company was listed on the Colombo Stock Exchange in 1969. By 1999, the company was headquartered in Kandy and had nine branches and two non-deposit-taking outlets. The company diversified into other areas of business including real estate development and insurance brokering. The company acquired a 90.1 per cent stake in Isuru Leasing, a small-scale finance company based in Kandy in November 2014. This was carried out as part of the plan of consolidating the financial services sector by the Central Bank of Sri Lanka.

Perpetual Treasuries, the primary dealer involved in the Central Bank of Sri Lanka bond scandal invested heavily in Central Finance. Perpetual Treasuries entered into the top ten shareholders in 2016.

== Operations ==
Central Finance Company is one of the licensed finance companies, authorised to accept deposits from the public by the Central Bank of Sri Lanka. The company's main business activities include leasing, hire purchase financing, deposit mobilization and providing other financial services. The company received an A+ rating from Fitch Ratings in 2019. The company owns a number of subsidiaries including Central Industries PLC and Kandy Private Hospitals (Pvt) Ltd. The company also has invested in Nations Trust Bank (owns a stake of 21.38%), Tea Smallholders Factories PLC (29.30%), and Capital Suisse Asia Ltd (24.58%). However, the Monetary Board of Central Bank has asked both John Keells Holdings and Central Finance Company to reduce their stakes in the Nations Trust Bank to a maximum of 20% at the end of 2021 and 15% at the end of 2022.

== See also ==
- List of companies listed on the Colombo Stock Exchange
