= LB Finance =

Sri Lankan non-banking financial company

L B Finance PLC
- Logo of LB Finance
- Company type: Public
- Traded as: CSE: LFIN.N0000; S&P Sri Lanka 20 Index component
- ISIN: LK0301N00008
- Industry: Financial services
- Founded: May 30, 1971; 55 years ago
- Headquarters: Colombo, Sri Lanka
- Key people: G. A. R. D. Prasanna (Chairman); Sumith Adhihetty (Managing Director)
- Revenue: ▲LKR42.756 billion (2023)
- Operating income: ▲LKR22.141 billion (2023)
- Net income: ▼LKR8.460 billion (2023)
- Total assets: ▲LKR183.018 billion (2023)
- Total equity: ▲LKR38.428 billion (2023)
- Owners: Vallibel One (51.75%); Royal Ceramics (26.08%); Esna Holdings (Pvt) Ltd (10.17%)
- Number of employees: ▼3,562 (2023)
- Parent: Vallibel One
- Subsidiaries: L B Microfinance Myanmar (100%); Multi Finance PLC (64.63%)
- Website: www.lbfinance.com

L B Finance PLC sometimes spelt LB Finance, is a Sri Lankan non-bank financial institution. The company is incorporated in 1971 and initially, the majority of shares were held by Lewis Brown & Company. The company was listed on the Colombo Stock Exchange in 1997. In 2003, Dhammika Perera acquired the company and became a subsidiary of Vallibel One. Currently, the company is one of the components of the S&P Sri Lanka 20 Index. Brand Finance ranked the company 24th in the 100 most valuable brands in Sri Lanka. The company placed 39th in the LMD 100 for the financial year 2019/20.

== History ==
L B Finance was incorporated in 1971 and in 1997 was listed on the Colombo Stock Exchange. Initially, Lewis Brown & Company held the majority (94.9%) of the company's shares. In 1994, Vanik Corporation acquired the company and in 2003 Dhammika Perera took over the company and subsequently became a subsidiary of Vallibel One. The company became the second-largest licensed finance company. A premier customer centre was opened in Cinnamon Gardens exclusively for high-value clients. The centre is geared with an eco-friendly and luxurious setting. In January 2021, the company announced a four-for-one stock split and it resulted in a 38% share price rise.

== Operations ==
L B Finance's headquarters is located in Dharmapala Mawatha, Kollupitiya and the 100th branch office was opened in Jaffna. The company is taking part in the Sri Lanka Interbank Payment System. At the 2021 SLIM-Nielsen Peoples Awards, L B Finance bagged the financial service provider of the year award. Fitch Ratings affirmed A- rating for the company in September 2021 and the outlook was adjudged as stable. K Seeds Investments, a Sri Lankan boutique investment bank ranked L B Finance the best performing finance company in the category of companies which asset base is greater than one billion rupees. The company has recorded a LKR1.34 billion profit for the first quarter of the financial year 2021/22, the highest among the 29 listed finance companies. L B Finance secured a US$15 million loan from FMO, a Dutch bank, to support the small and medium enterprise sector. L B Finance donated a ventilator to Maharagama Apeksha Hospital during the COVID-19 pandemic. LB Finance bought a controlling stake in Multi Finance in 2022. LB Finance acquired 64% of the Stake in Multi Finance for LKR400 million from Fairway Holdings.

On 26 November 2025, it was reported that LB Finance has completed the acquisition of Associated Motor Finance Company PLC in a deal worth over Rs. 4.1 billion (approximately US$13.37 million).

== See also ==
- List of companies listed on the Colombo Stock Exchange
- List of Sri Lankan public corporations by market capitalisation
