= Nations Trust Bank =

Sri Lankan commercial bank

Nations Trust Bank PLC
- Logo of Nations Trust Bank
- Type: Public
- Traded as: CSE: NTB.N0000
- ISIN: LK0309N00001
- Industry: Finance
- Founded: January 21, 1999; 27 years ago
- Headquarters: Colombo, Sri Lanka
- Number of locations: 96 (2022)
- Area served: Sri Lanka
- Key people: Sherin Cader (Chairperson); Hemantha Gunetilleke (Chief Executive Officer)
- Products: Banking, financial and related services
- Revenue: ▲LKR64.818 billion (2022)
- Operating income: ▲LKR38.867 billion (2022)
- Net income: ▲LKR7.228 billion (2022)
- Total assets: ▲LKR414.944 billion (2022)
- Total equity: ▲LKR46.041 billion (2022)
- Owners: John Keells Holdings (19.72%); HWIC Asia Fund (15.00%); Central Finance Company (9.84%)
- Number of employees: ▼2,479 (2022)
- Subsidiaries: Waldock Mackenzie Ltd; Allied Properties Ltd; Nations Insurance Brokers Ltd
- Website: www.nationstrust.com

Nations Trust Bank, regulated by the Central Bank of Sri Lanka and governed by the Banking Act, commenced operations in July 1999 following the acquisition of the Colombo branch of the Overseas Trust Bank. Historically, the Bank’s profitability has been primarily driven by its Corporate Banking segment. However, the Bank now aims to position itself as a retail-focused commercial institution.

Nations Trust Bank PLC (abbreviated as NTB) is one of the listed banks in Sri Lanka with 96 branches, 99 ATMs and 64 cash deposit & withdrawal machines as well as an automated channels and is the issuer and sole acquirer for American Express Credit Cards in Sri Lanka. Nation Trust Bank's major shareholders are John Keells Holdings and Central Finance Company PLC which are leading companies in their respective operating sectors in Sri Lanka.

== History ==
Nations Trust Bank was established in July 1999 when it acquired the Colombo Branch of Overseas Trust Bank Ltd.

- Acquisition of Waldock Mackenzie Ltd.
- Acquisition of the Kandy branch of the Standard Chartered Bank
- Acquisition of the Personal Banking portfolio of Deutsche Bank
- Acquisition of the Commercial Banking Business and Foreign Exchange Business of American Express Bank in Colombo
- Merger with Mercantile Leasing Company in January 2006

The bank has 96 branches and 99 ATM machines.
