= C T Holdings =

Sri Lankan conglomerate holding company

C T Holdings PLC
- Logo of C T Holdings
- Type: Public
- Traded as: CSE: CTHR.N0000
- ISIN: LK0041N00000
- Industry: Holding company; Entertainment industry; Financial services; Retail
- Founded: 1928; 98 years ago
- Founder: Chittampalam A. Gardiner
- Headquarters: Colombo, Sri Lanka
- Key people: Anthony Page (Chairman Emeritus); Louis Page (Chairman); Ranjit Page (Deputy Chairman/Managing Director)
- Revenue: ▲LKR196.3 billion (2023)
- Operating income: ▲LKR13.7 billion (2023)
- Net income: ▲LKR5.1 billion (2023)
- Total assets: ▲LKR127.2 billion (2023)
- Total equity: ▲LKR35.4 billion (2023)
- Owners: Odeon Holdings (Ceylon) (42.09%); Ranjit Page (8.83%); Anthony Page (8.69%)
- Parent: Odeon Holdings (Ceylon)
- Subsidiaries: Cargills (Ceylon); C T Land Development; Ceylon Theatres (Private) Limited

C T Holdings PLC, formerly known as Ceylon Theatres Limited, is an investment holding company and one of the largest conglomerates in Sri Lanka. The company was incorporated in 1928 by Chittampalam A. Gardiner and quoted on the Colombo Stock Exchange ever since. In 2019, Brand Finance ranked C T Holdings eighth amongst the most valuable conglomerates in Sri Lanka with a brand value of LKR18,981 million. C T Holdings also ranked eighth in the LMD 100, a list of leading listed companies in Sri Lanka by the business magazine, LMD. The company holds a 71% stake in Sri Lanka's largest food company, Cargills (Ceylon).

== History ==
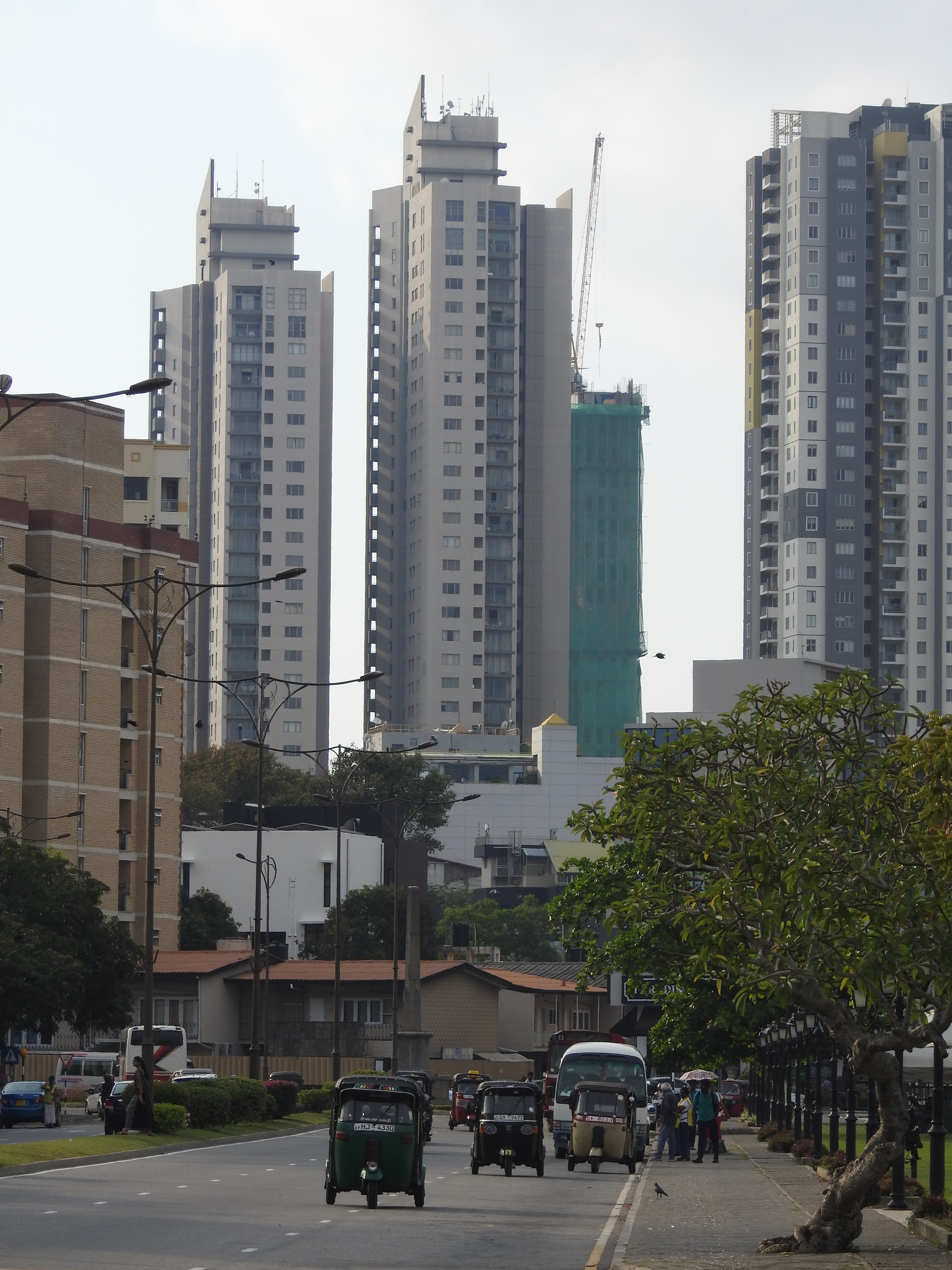
Empire Residencies building is completed in 2009

Ceylon Theatres Limited was founded by Chittampalam A. Gardiner and Alfred Thambiayah in 1928. It is the first Ceylonese company to enter the film screening business. Four years later the company was floated. The Regal Cinema in Colombo and another in Nuwara Eliya made up the assets of the company. By 1950, Ceylon Theatres was the largest film circuit in the country. The company controlled 69 permanent cinemas of which 14 were located in Colombo.

In 1981, under the leadership of Albert A. Page, the company acquired Millers and Cargills venturing into retailing and distribution. Cargills entered the modern retail (supermarkets) sector in 1983, with the launch of Cargills FoodCity, which has since gone on to become Sri lanka's largest and most extensive supermarket chain. In 1991 the company built the Majestic City shopping complex and cineplex, one of the first at the time in Sri Lanka. In 1993, Cargills entered the food production business with the acquisition of a smallgoods processing plant in Mattakuliya. In 1996, the company obtained the franchise rights for Kentucky Fried Chicken (KFC). In 2002, Cargills acquired an ice cream processing plant and also acquired the KIST food brand and its processing facility, expanding its presence as a food processor. When the Government of Sri Lanka divested its stake in Lanka Ceramics Limited, Ceylon Theatres acquired 65% of the shares. Empire Residencies, a 37 and 33-storeyed residential apartment twin-tower completed in 2009. In 2010, the company name was changed from Ceylon Theatres to C T Holdings. Kotmale Holdings, a dairy products manufacturing company was acquired in 2011. During the same time, Cargills also entered the confectionery sector with another acquisition. The company acquired a license to operate a commercial bank in 2014 and launched Cargills Bank. CT Holdings and Cargills collectively hold over 60% of the bank. In 2013, the Cargills Square was established in Jaffna, which has since been expanded to locations in Gampaha, Dematagoda, Katubedda and Bandarawela. On August 24, Deputy Chairman Ranjith Page, under whom the Food City chain expanded, sold at least 18.2 million of his 19.1 million shares listed in the latest quarterly accounts in a surprise move. He also sold 6 million shares in Cargills Ceylon.

== Operations ==
The company has been described as one of the most traditionally managed family-held businesses in the country. C T Holdings is predominantly an investment holding company. Its key subsidiaries are Cargills (Ceylon) PLC, Ceylon Theatres, and C T Land Development PLC. C T Holdings is also a promoter of Cargills Bank. The main operations of C T Holdings are managed through its subsidiary Cargills (Ceylon) PLC. C T Holdings operates the Regal and Majestic cinemas across Sri Lanka, through its subsidiary Ceylon Theatres. C T Holdings partnered with BookMyShow, an India-based online ticketing platform. The partnership allowed access to the Vista ERP system, a customisable ERP System.

The company owns and manages the Majestic City shopping complex through its subsidiary C T Land Development PLC, a listed entity on the Colombo Stock Exchange. The company owns and operates the Cargills Square shopping malls in Jaffna, Gampaha, Dematagoda, Katubedda and Bandarawela.

== See also ==
- List of companies listed on the Colombo Stock Exchange
- List of Sri Lankan public corporations by market capitalisation
