= Sampath Bank =

Sri Lankan commercial bank

Sampath Bank PLC
- The logo of Sampath Bank
- Company type: Public
- Traded as: CSE: SAMP.N0000
- ISIN: LK0090N00007
- Industry: Financial
- Founded: March 10, 1986; 40 years ago
- Headquarters: Colombo, Sri Lanka
- Number of locations: 229 branches (321 ATMs) (2023)
- Area served: Sri Lanka
- Key people: Harsha Amarasekera (Chairman); Sanjaya Gunawardana (Managing Director/CEO)
- Revenue: ▲LKR206.002 billion (2022)
- Operating income: ▼LKR21.971 billion (2022)
- Net income: ▲LKR14.061 billion (2022)
- AUM: LKR4.357 trillion 2022
- Total assets: ▲LKR1.367 trillion (2022)
- Total equity: ▲LKR135.551 billion (2022)
- Owners: Vallibel One (14.95%); Ayenka Holdings Pvt Ltd (9.97%); Employees' Provident Fund (9.97%)
- Number of employees: ▼3,948 (2022)
- Subsidiaries: Sampath Centre Ltd; SC Securities (Pvt) Ltd; Siyapatha Finance PLC; Sampath Information Technology Solutions Ltd
- Website: www.sampath.lk

Sampath Bank PLC (Sinhala: සම්පත් බැංකුව, romanized: sampat bæṁkuva, Tamil: சம்பத் வங்கி, romanized: campat vaṅki) is a licensed commercial bank incorporated in Sri Lanka in 1987 with 229 branches and 373 ATMs island-wide. It has won the "Bank of the Year" award by The Banker of Financial Times Limited – London, for two consecutive years, and the "National Business Excellence Awards 2010". It has become the third largest private sector bank in Sri Lanka with Rs. 453 billion in deposits as of 30 June 2016.

== History ==
The bank was originally incorporated as the Investment and Credit Bank Limited in 1988. The bank became popularly known as Sampath. In 1988, Sampath Bank started to operate a multi-point network of automated teller machines (ATMs) for the first time in the country, as "Sampath Electronic Teller" or "SET". Then, as the popularity of ATM banking increased it introduced MasterCard (in 1989), PBU (Personal Banking Unit) and Uni-Banking System. The bank was the first to introduce debit cards in South Asia in 1997. Since 2009, the bank is the third-largest private sector bank in Sri Lanka in terms of total assets.

== Growth ==
The inaugural office of Sampath Bank was situated at Wijewardhana Mawatha in Colombo 10. In 1998, the bank relocated its headquarters to Sir James Peiris Mawatha in Colombo 02, Sri Lanka. By the end of its first year, the staff had grown to 94 members.

The first ATM of the bank was installed in 1986, and by the end of 2007, the total number had surpassed 150.

In 1996, the bank introduced its "tele banking" service marking the beginning of its journey into the realm of technology-driven banking. By 1998, this initiative was further strengthened through the integration of IT innovations, culminating in the launch of "Sampath Net" internet banking service in July 2000. Its latest innovation is "Slipless banking," which removes the necessity for paperwork in the majority of over-the-counter transactions.

The bank operates a total of 229 branches which includes 12 designated as super branches. Additionally, there are 360 ATMs in operation, with 8 of these located off-site.

== Technology ==
Since its opening in 1986, Sampath Bank is the first bank in Sri Lanka to operate using a fully computerised database.

Sampath Bank was the first to introduce the use of ATMs, MasterCard, Personal Banking Unit Facilities, Uni Banking System & Debit Cards (Initially with Cirrus and Maestro and Visa) to Sri Lanka. After its massive re-engineering during the transfer to IT-induced banking, the bank was able to launch Internet Banking, Internet Payment Gateways and 24/7 mobile banking services.

The Bank was the first in Sri Lanka to introduce one-day clearing for all cheques drawn on any branch, collected by any commercial bank on the island and presented through the Sri Lanka Automated Clearing House (SLACH). It launched the first-ever Cheque Imaging and Truncation (CIT) system to Sri Lanka in October 2004.

Sampath Bank won a Gold and Merit Award at the National Best Quality Software Awards 2008 for developing the "Credit Approval System" (CAS) and "Electronic Money Transfer" (EMTS) applications. It was also honoured at the National Science and Technology Awards 2008 in the category of "Local Developed New Technologies" for the "Sampath eRemittance System".

== See also ==
- List of banks in Sri Lanka
