= W. K. H. Wegapitiya =

Sri Lankan entrepreneur

Deshabandu Wegapitiya Kattadiyalage Hemachandra Wegapitiya
- Other name: W. K. H. Wegapitiya
- Education: Pinnawala Central College and University of Sri Jayewardenepura
- Occupation: Entrepreneur
- Title: Founder and Chairman of LAUGFS Holdings
- Spouse: Dayani Wegapitiya

Deshabandu Dr. Wegapitiya Kattadiyalage Hemachandra Wegapitiya, known professionally as Dr. W.K.H. Wegapitiya, is a Sri Lankan entrepreneur. He is one of the founders and the current chairman of LAUGFS Holdings Limited.

== See also ==
- LAUGFS Holdings
- Sri Lanka Telecom
