= National Cancer Institute (Sri Lanka) =

- Ministry of Health, Sri Lanka
- Sri Lanka Colombo District

Geography
- Location: Maharagama 10280, Maharagama, Sri Lanka
- Coordinates: 6°50′14″N 79°55′13″E

Organisation
- Care system: Public
- Type: Cancer

Services
- Emergency department: Yes

Links
- Website: www.nccp.health.gov.lk

The National Cancer Institute (also known as Apeksha Hospital) is a government hospital in Maharagama, Sri Lanka. Which is under the control of Department of Health, provides all its services free of charge. As of February 2020 Sri Lanka has more than 50,000 cancer patients, with 14,000 annual deaths due to cancer.
