= Royal Ceramics =

Sri Lankan manufacturing company

Royal Ceramics Lanka PLC
- Type: Public
- Traded as: CSE: RCL.N0000; S&P Sri Lanka 20 Index component
- ISIN: LK0217N00006
- Industry: Capital goods
- Founded: August 29, 1990; 36 years ago
- Headquarters: Colombo, Sri Lanka
- Key people: Dhammika Perera (Chairman); Harsha Amarasekera (Co-Chairman); A. M. Weerasinghe (Deputy Chairman); Aravinda Perera (Managing Director)
- Revenue: ▲ Sri Lankan rupee LKR68.096 billion (2025/26)
- Operating income: ▼LKR12.749 (2025/26)
- Net income: ▼LKR8.274 billion (2025/26)
- Total assets: ▲LKR121.367 billion (2025/26)
- Total equity: ▲LKR73 billion (2025/26)
- Owners: Vallibel One (55.96%); Employees' Provident Fund (13.79%)
- Number of employees: 4,659 (2025/26)
- Parent: Vallibel One
- Subsidiaries: Lanka Ceramic PLC (73.56%); Lanka Walltiles PLC (54.55%); Rocell Bathware Limited (100%); Eco Pack Solutions Lanka Ltd (50%)
- Website: www.rocell.com

Royal Ceramics Lanka PLC branded as Rocell, is a Sri Lankan holding company and is also engaged in manufacturing ceramic tiles and bath ware. The company was founded in 1990 and in 1994, it was listed on the Colombo Stock Exchange. The company is one of the constituents of the S&P Sri Lanka 20 Index. LMD, a Sri Lankan business magazine placed the company 38th in the LMD 100, a list of leading listed companies in Sri Lanka. Brand Finance ranked 74th amongst the 100 most valuable brands in Sri Lanka.

== History ==
Royal Ceramics was incorporated in 1990 and in 1994, the company was quoted on the Colombo Stock Exchange. Subsidiaries of the company, Royal Porcelain (Pvt) Ltd and Rocell Bathware Ltd commenced operations in 2002 and 2009 respectively. From 2010, the company engaged in a series of acquiring stakes in other companies. This resulted in Royal Ceramics taking control of a stake of 20% in Delmege Forsyth In 2010, 25.85% in LB Finance in 2012, and 76.54% in Lanka Ceramics PLC in 2013. The acquisition of Lanaka Ceramics PLC for LKR2.9 billion from C T Holdings gave Royal Ceramics the monopoly over the tile market in Sri Lanka. The purchase became the 13th acquisition affected by the Dhammika Perera-Nimal Perera duo. In 2014, Rocell Pty Ltd was incorporated in Australia with LKR61.5 million initial investments as a part of international expansion. A restructuring in 2017 saw Lanka Walltiles PLC being brought under the direct control of Royal Ceramics from Lanka Ceramic PLC. Royal Porcelain (Pvt) Ltd amalgamated with Royal Ceramics in 2019 and in 2021 CP Holdings was acquired.

== Operations ==
By the mid-2020s, Royal Ceramics had completed its planned tile manufacturing expansion and introduced an affordable product range aimed at competing more effectively with imported tiles, while continuing to serve the premium segment under the Rocell brand. Despite continued competitive pressure from tile imports following the lifting of import restrictions imposed during the Sri Lankan economic crisis, the Tiles and Associated Products sector the Group's largest business segment, contributing 60% of revenue recovered to record a 14% revenue increase to LKR41.07 billion in the financial year ended 31 March 2026. Group revenue for the same period rose 14% to LKR68.1 billion, supported by growth across all business sectors, while profit after tax increased 37% to LKR8.27 billion. The company declared a dividend of LKR2.00 per share for the financial year. In the Institute of Chartered Accountants of Sri Lanka's 53rd Annual Reports Awards, the company won the silver award in the manufacturing category. The Prime Minister Ranil Wickremesinghe attended the event as the guest of honour. Royal Ceramics renamed its subsidiary, Rocell Ceramics Limited to Biscuits and Chocolate Company Limited in a bid to diversify into confectionery industry. In recognition of its manufacturing standards, Royal Ceramics Lanka PLC received the Gold Award in the Manufacturing (Large Scale) category at the Sri Lanka National Quality Award 2023, presented by the Sri Lanka Standards Institution (SLSI), the national standards body under the Ministry of Technology. The company was also honoured with the Gold Award at the National Level in the Extra Large Manufacturing Sector category at the CNCI Achievers Awards 2023, presented by the Ceylon National Chamber of Industries, and received a Gold Award under the Presidential Environmental Award (2024–2027) for its Eheliyagoda plant in the Mineral Related Manufacturing Industry category.

== See also ==
- List of companies listed on the Colombo Stock Exchange
- List of Sri Lankan public corporations by market capitalisation
