= Colombo Stock Exchange =

Main stock exchange of Sri Lanka, located in Colombo

- කොළඹ ව්‍යාපාර වස්තු හුවමාරුව கொழும்பு பங்கு பரிவர்த்தனை
- Type: Stock Exchange
- Location: Colombo, Sri Lanka
- Founded: 1896; 130 years ago (as Share Brokers Association); 1985; 41 years ago (as Colombo Stock Exchange)
- Key people: Dimuthu Abeyesekera (Chairman); Rajiva Bandaranaike (CEO)
- Currency: LKR
- No. of listings: 286 companies representing 19 business sectors (as at 31 August 2025)
- Market cap: ▲ Rs 7,447 billion (2025)
- Indices: All Share Price Index (ASPI); S&P Sri Lanka 20 Index (S&P SL20)
- Website: www.cse.lk

The Colombo Stock Exchange (CSE) (Sinhala: කොළඹ ව්‍යාපාර වස්තු හුවමාරුව, romanized: Kolamba Vyapara Vasthu Huvamaruva; Tamil: கொழும்பு பங்கு பரிவர்த்தனை) is the main stock exchange in Sri Lanka that utilizes an electronic trading platform. The CSE headquarters have been located at the World Trade Center (Colombo) Towers in Colombo since 1995, and it has regional branches in Kandy, Jaffna, Negombo, Matara, Kurunegala, Anuradhapura and Ratnapura. The CSE trades 296 companies representing 20 business sectors, as of 25 January 2021, with a combined market capitalization of 3,699 billion Sri Lankan rupees.

On 1 September 2021, turnover surpassed 14 billion and the All Share Price Index (ASPI) surpassed 9000 points for the first time when it closed at a record high of 9,163.13 points.

== History ==
Share trading in Sri Lanka was initiated in 1896 under the Share Brokers Association (SBA). The Colombo Brokers' Association began auctioning land shares in 1904 and gradually became the SBA's competitor. The two organizations combined to form the Colombo Securities Exchange in 1985.

The establishment of a formal stock exchange took place in 1985 with the incorporation of the Colombo Stock Exchange (CSE), which took over the Stock Market from the Colombo Share Brokers Association. It currently has a membership of 15 institutions, all of which are licensed to operate as stockbrokers.^{[3]}

The company was renamed the Colombo Stock Exchange in 1990. The CSE introduced the Central Depository System, which automated clearing. The CSE headquarters opened in World Trade Center Colombo in 1995.^{[3]} The Milanka Price Index (MPI) of the CSE's 25 best-performing stocks was introduced in 1999. Several regional CSE branches were opened within the country, at Kandy, Jaffna, Ambalantota, Matara, Kurunegala, Anuradhapura and Ratnapura.

=== Post-ceasefire boom ===
After mediocre performance throughout the 1990s mainly due to the Sri Lankan Civil War, the ceasefire agreement signed in 2001 saw unprecedented growth in both indices of the CSE. The All Share Price Index (ASPI), which was hovering around the 500 mark in August 2001, surpassed the 2000 mark.

This led CSE to be consistently dubbed one of the best-performing markets in the world. From 2002 to 2005, the CSE recorded a consistent annual growth of over 30% in the ASPI. It surpassed that in 2006, with the ASPI growing by 41.6% and the MPI growing by 51.4% during that calendar year. CSE recorded its highest point on 26 February 2007, when the MPI reached 4,214.8 points.

Buoyed by improved investor confidence due to political developments and strong corporate results the CSE continued to achieve high growth in 2007, as the ASPI passed the 3,000 mark for the first time on 13 February, reaching a series of record highs across seven consecutive days. The CSE also recorded an average daily turnover of රු.776.8 million for 2007.

=== Post war boom ===
After the end of the Sri Lankan Civil War on 18 May 2009, CSE indexes increased rapidly, setting new records. Market capitalization set a record high on 6 October 2009 as the CSE reached the රු.1 trillion mark for the first time. ASPI set a record of 3549.27 points on 11 January 2010. CSE was the best performing stock exchange in the world in 2009 as it jumped 125.2 percent during that year.

=== Recent years ===
CSE transferred nine traded companies to their Watch List with effect from 7 June 2018 due to their failure to submit quarterly financial statements.

The CSE made a statement that investment flows from the Scandinavian region to Sri Lankan stocks had improved in recent years, where inward investments have grown by 39 percent per annum (CAGR) since 2013. According to a CSE statement, Scandinavian countries have collectively invested රු.8.2 billion in local equities year-to-date, which amounted to 23 percent of the total foreign purchases during the period.

The National Stock Exchange (NSE) and the CSE signed an agreement to explore opportunities to work together and foster a strategic relationship. The agreement is intended for cooperation on the exchange of information and expertise and also paves the way for the NSE to play a consultative role in a number of strategic initiatives implemented by the CSE, including new product development and exchange operations.

The CSE launched a guide to help listed Sri Lankan companies address environmental, social and corporate governance (ESG) factors in their capital market communications.

== Current status ==
=== Financial ===
The CSE has 290 listed companies representing 20 business sectors as of 30 June 2019, with a market capitalization of රු.2,523.38 billion.

There are currently two indices in the CSE:

- The All Share Price Index (ASPI)
- The S&P Sri Lanka 20 Index (S&P SL20)

The Milanka Price Index (MPI) was abolished after 30 December 2012.

=== Sustainability ===
On 24 September 2015, CSE declared its entry in to the United Nations Sustainable Stock Exchanges Initiative and its intentions to promote ESG issues, with the support of the local network of the United Nations Global Compact.

=== Trading ===
The exchange is open on weekdays (except national holidays). Due to the COVID-19 pandemic, since 26 May 2020 the market trading hours of 09:30 to 14:30 were shortened to 11:00 to 14:30.

=== Technology ===
The CSE operates 2 main systems:

- The Central Depository System (CDS)
- Automated Trading System (ATS)

The automation of the exchange commenced in 1991 with the installation of a central depository and an electronic clearing and settlement system for share transactions. The trading activity was automated with the installation of the Automated Trading System (ATS) in 1997. After implementing ATS version-7, the Debt Securities Trading System (DEX) was abolished since ATS-7 provides a platform for both debt and equity.

The CSE is currently in the process of introducing a debt securities trading system for trading fixed-income securities.

As a modern exchange, the CSE now offers an "order-driven trading platform" for securities trading, including shares, corporate debt securities, and government debt securities.

=== Affiliation ===
The CSE was selected as the 52nd member of the World Federation of Exchanges in October 1998, and was the first exchange in the South Asian Region to obtain membership.

The CSE became a founding member of the South Asian Federation of Exchanges (SAFE) in January 2000 and is currently the Chairman of the Association. SAFE consists of 17 exchanges from India, Pakistan, Bangladesh, Sri Lanka, Nepal, and Bhutan. Its primary objectives are to encourage cooperation among its members to promote the development of their individual securities markets, to develop an integrated regional stock trading system, and to offer to list and trade securities issued in the region.

The CSE joined Sustainable Stock Exchanges Initiative in September 2015.

== Foreign investors ==
Companies listed on the CSE have seen a large increase in foreign investment following the conclusion of the 30-year Sri Lankan Civil War.

Foreign investment in the stock market is freely permitted except in the case of a few companies where restrictions are imposed. Investment in shares in Sri Lanka and repatriation of proceeds take place through Share Investment External Rupee Accounts (SIERA) opened with licensed commercial banks. Income from investments such as interest, dividends, and profit realized from such investments are not subject to exchange control regulations by the Sri Lankan government.

== See also ==
- List of companies listed on the Colombo Stock Exchange
- List of South Asian stock exchanges
- Asia-Pacific Central Securities Depository Group
