= Keells Food Products =

Sri Lankan meat processing company

Keells Food Products PLC
- Logo of Keells Food Products
- Company type: Public
- Traded as: CSE: KFP.N0000
- ISIN: LK0101N00002
- Industry: Food
- Founded: November 5, 1982; 42 years ago
- Headquarters: Colombo, Sri Lanka
- Key people: Krishan Balendra (Chairman)
- Brands: Keells Krest; Elephant House
- Revenue: ▲LKR6,444 million (2023)
- Operating income: ▼LKR230 million (2023)
- Net income: ▼LKR14 million (2023)
- Total assets: ▲LKR4,303 million (2023)
- Total equity: ▼LKR2,108 million (2023)
- Number of employees: ▼543 (2023)
- Parent: John Keells Holdings
- Website: www.keellsfoods.com

Keells Food Products PLC is a processed meat company, headquartered in Colombo, Sri Lanka.

== History ==
Keells Food Products was founded in 1982 and listed on the Colombo Stock Exchange in the following year. In 1992, the government decided to impose a 30% luxury item tax on processed meat reducing the profits of the company. Keells Food Products acquired D&W Foods Ltd in Pannala for LKR700 million in 2012. With the acquisition, the production capacity was doubled. D&W Foods Ltd is a Board of Investment of Sri Lanka-approved project that was set up as a joint venture with a Belgian company to produce Frankfurter sausages for the export market. The company's corporate social responsibility project won an award at Ceylon Chamber of Commerce's 2012 Corporate Citizen Awards. Keells Food partnered with Sri Lanka Cricket to sponsor the South African cricket team's 2014 Sri Lanka tour. The company has been a long-term patron of cricket in Sri Lanka.

== Operations ==
The company's Keells Krest brand has been the market leader in the processed meat market segment for three decades. Keells Krest brand is one the 100 most valuable brands in Sri Lanka. The brand value of Keells Krest is estimated to be worth LKR1,127 million in 2022, a 12.6% growth from the previous year. Keells Food Product is ranked 15th in LMD 100 second board in its 2020/21 edition. LMD 100 ranks publicly quoted companies of Sri Lanka by revenue annually. The company has been set up to fill the gap in providing quality food to the hotel industry in Sri Lanka. Hotels and airlines have remained long-term clients of the company. Keells Food Product commissioned a new factory in Makandura Industrial Zone in Pannala in 2019. High food inflation due to the Sri Lankan economic crisis affected the company's and its sister company Ceylon Cold Stores' supply chain. The direct cost of the company rose by 81% in the second quarter of 2022.

== See also ==
- List of companies listed on the Colombo Stock Exchange
