= Union Assurance =

Sri Lankan insurance company

Union Assurance PLC
- Current logo was introduced in 2020 which depicts the "circle of life"
- Type: Public
- Traded as: CSE: UAL.N0000
- ISIN: LK0179N00008
- Industry: Insurance
- Founded: January 8, 1987; 39 years ago
- Headquarters: Colombo, Sri Lanka
- Number of locations: 85 (2023)
- Key people: Krishan Balendra (Chairman); Senath Jayatilake (Chief Executive Officer)
- Revenue: ▲LKR29.958 billion (2023)
- Operating income: ▲LKR4.944 billion (2023)
- Net income: ▲LKR3.758 billion (2023)
- AUM: ▲LKR83.420 billion (2023)
- Total assets: ▲LKR95.670 billion (2023)
- Total equity: ▼LKR24.161 billion (2023)
- Number of employees: ▼780 (2023)
- Parent: John Keells Holdings
- Website: unionassurance.com

Union Assurance PLC is a Sri Lankan life insurance company headquartered at No. 20, St. Michael's Road, Colombo 03.[1] Established on 8 January 1987, it was Sri Lanka's first private-sector life insurer and is listed on the Colombo Stock Exchange (CSE: UAL.N0000).[2][3] The company is licensed by the Insurance Regulatory Commission of Sri Lanka (IRCSL)[4] and is a subsidiary of John Keells Holdings PLC, the largest conglomerate listed on the Colombo Stock Exchange,[5] which holds a 90% stake.[2]

Union Assurance was formed in 1987 by Aitken Spence, Carson Cumberbatch, Mercantile Credit and Whittall Boustead,[3] after the Control of Insurance (Amendment) Act, No. 42 of 1986 allowed private companies to enter the insurance business, ending the state monopoly.[6][7] In 2009, John Keells Holdings acquired an 81% controlling stake in the company.[3] Following a regulatory requirement to separate life and general insurance businesses, Union Assurance sold a 78% stake in its general insurance business to Fairfax Asia Limited, completed in January 2015, and thereafter operated solely as a life insurer.[8][9][10] In September 2025, it sold its remaining 22% stake in Fairfirst Insurance Limited to Fairfax Asia for Rs. 2.64 billion.[1]

As of 31 December 2025, Union Assurance reported total assets of LKR 127.2 billion and gross written premium (GWP) of LKR 25.75 billion, an increase of 19% over the previous year.[11] The company serves more than 340,000 policyholders through 95 branches and a field sales force of over 3,000 advisors,[2] and has bancassurance partnerships with Sampath Bank,[12] Nations Trust Bank,[13] Union Bank,[14] Seylan Bank[15] and Pan Asia Bank.[16] Its products cover health, education, retirement, protection, investment and group life insurance;[2] Union Assurance FlexLife, launched in 2025, combines the five individual categories in a single plan.[17]

Since 2020, the company has introduced several digital services that it describes as firsts in Sri Lanka's life insurance industry.[18][19] Its Clicklife mobile application, launched in December 2020,[18] lets policyholders manage policies, earn digital loyalty rewards,[20] access telemedicine services[21] and purchase life insurance directly through the app.[22] The company runs BlogIT, an annual writing competition on financial literacy launched in 2022,[23] and a YouTube talk show, Circle of Well-being.[2] Its corporate social responsibility programme, Union Assurance Suwamaga, launched in 2024, focuses on diabetes awareness and early detection,[24][25] and its mobile screening unit has provided free diabetes screening to more than 15,000 people.[26]

Union Assurance was the only Sri Lankan company included in Forbes Asia's Best Under a Billion list in 2018.[27] It has been ranked in the LMD 100, an annual list of Sri Lanka's largest listed companies by revenue.[28] In 2025, it became the first life insurer in Sri Lanka to be certified under the ISO/IEC 27001:2022 information security management standard,[19] and the first Sri Lankan insurer to receive a YouTube Silver Play Button for passing 100,000 subscribers.[29]

== History ==
Union Assurance was founded in 1987 by Aitken Spence, Carson Cumberbatch, Mercantile Credit and Whittall Boustead. The company commenced operations and was listed on the Colombo Stock Exchange in the following year. Union Assurance entered the market when the Government of Sri Lanka ended the government monopoly of the insurance sector with the enactment of the Control of Insurance Act No. 42 of 1986. Sri Lankan conglomerate John Keells Holdings acquired 81% shares in Union Assurance in 2009 thus giving them control of the company.

Union Assurance divided its life and non-life businesses in 2015, and divested its stake in the non-life insurance business to Fairfirst Insurance. Union Assurance held 8.7% of insurance sector assets in 2016, making them the fourth biggest player behind Sri Lanka Insurance, Ceylinco Insurance and AIA Insurance. In 2018, Union Assurance was included in Forbes Asia's Best Under a Billion list. The company was the only Sri Lankan company on the list that year. The company introduced its new logo in 2020, which emphasises the company's repositioning in the life insurance sector.

== Operations ==
In 2014, Union Assurance held 8.7% of total insurance sector assets in Sri Lanka, the fourth largest share behind Sri Lanka Insurance, Ceylinco Insurance and AIA Insurance.[30] In 2018, it was included in Forbes Asia's Best Under a Billion list, the only Sri Lankan company on the list that year.[27]

Union Assurance is ranked in the LMD 100, an annual list of publicly traded companies in Sri Lanka ranked by revenue.[28] By 2023, it had been named among the 100 Most Valuable Consumer Brands in Sri Lanka by LMD and Brand Finance for 15 consecutive years,[31] and in 2025 it was placed within the top 50 of Brand Finance's ranking of Sri Lanka's most valuable brands.[32] It has also been ranked among the top three most loved life insurance brands in Sri Lanka by LMD and Brand Finance.[33]

In 2020, Union Assurance launched a new brand identity, with a logo depicting the "circle of life" and the tagline Your Life, Our Strength.[3][34] The company described the rebrand as repositioning it as a customer-centric, digital life insurer,[34] and said it was the first insurer in Sri Lanka to adopt a fully digital, paperless policy submission process.[34] In December 2020, it launched Clicklife, a product allowing customers to buy life insurance online without paperwork or medical reports.[18]

Union Assurance distributes life insurance through bancassurance partnerships with five banks in Sri Lanka.[2][12][13][14][15][16]

Jude Gomes, previously chief executive officer and president of Manulife China Bank Life Assurance Corporation in the Philippines, became chief executive officer in December 2019.[35] He was succeeded by Senath Jayatilake, formerly the company's deputy chief executive, in January 2024.[36]

Union Assurance received awards at the Women Friendly Workplace Awards in 2022 and 2024.[37][38]

== Union Assurance Branch Network ==
As of 31 December 2025, Union Assurance operates a network of 95 branches across Sri Lanka, covering all nine provinces of the island. The branches are supported by a field agency force of 2,698 agents and are complemented by five bancassurance partnerships and digital channels including the Clicklife mobile application.

== Finances ==
Financial summary Financial figures are in LKR (mns)
Year	GWP	Profit	Assets	Equity	Employees
2023	18,867	3,758	95,670	24,161	780
2022	16,675	2,747	75,969	14,214	798
2021	15,406	2,054	70,762	15,455	770
2020	13,109	921	62,600	15,108	795
2019	11,648	1,158	55,249	14,663	764
2018	11,244	3,244	49,117	13,672	614
2017	10,118	7,384	43,067	11,965	529
2016	8,271	1,313	35,693	3,867	474
2015	6,965	2,347	31,014	3,465	450
2014	5,945	881	35,604	6,211	445

Source: Annual Report, 2023 (pp. 300–301)

== See also ==
- List of companies listed on the Colombo Stock Exchange
