= Cinnamon Lakeside Colombo =

Luxury hotel in Sri Lanka

- Logo of Cinnamon Lakeside Colombo

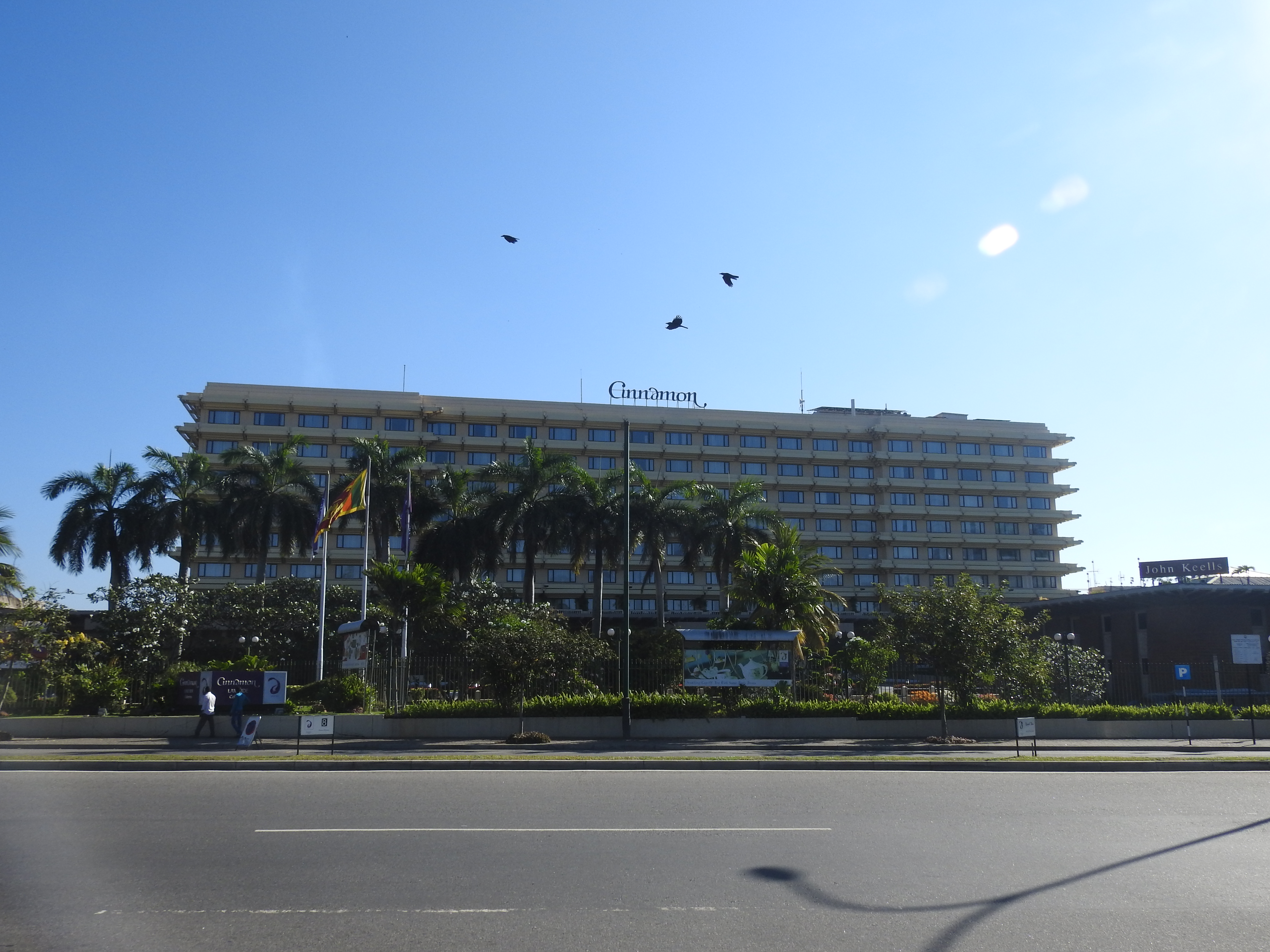
- Cinnamon Lakeside Colombo exterior
- Hotel chain: Cinnamon Hotels & Resorts

General information
- Type: Hotel
- Location: Colombo, Sri Lanka
- Opened: 1985; 41 years ago

Other information
- Number of rooms: 346
- Number of suites: 20
- Number of restaurants: 5
- Number of bars: 3

Website
- www.cinnamonhotels.com/cinnamonlakesidecolombo
- Company
- Type: Public
- Traded as: CSE: TRAN.N0000
- ISIN: LK0166N00005
- Founded: July 17, 1981; 44 years ago
- Key people: Krishan Balendra (Chairman)
- Revenue: ▲LKR3,569 million (2023)
- Operating income: ▲LKR92 million (2023)
- Net income: ▼LKR(97) million (2023)
- Total assets: ▲LKR8,657 million (2023)
- Total equity: ▲LKR5,942 million (2023)
- Owners: John Keells Holdings (48.64%); Asian Hotels and Properties (43.41%)
- Number of employees: ▲601 (2023)
- Parent: Asian Hotels and Properties

Cinnamon Lakeside Colombo, trading as Trans Asia Hotels PLC, is a five-star luxury hotel and one of the prominent resorts in Colombo, Sri Lanka. The hotel is listed on the Colombo Stock Exchange and John Keells Holdings owns a stake of 92% of the company's shares, 48% directly and 43% through its subsidiary Asian Hotels and Properties PLC. Cinnamon Lakeside Colombo has 346 rooms including 20 suites.

== History ==
The company was incorporated in 1981 as a public limited company. The hotel commenced its operations in 1985 and was originally known as the Ramada Renaissance Hotel. In 1995 the name was changed to Trans Asia Hotel. In 2003, John Keells Holdings acquired a controlling stake of the company and in 2009, the hotel is rebranded as Cinnamon Lakeside Colombo. During the Commonwealth Heads of Government Meeting 2013, some of the heads of State stayed at the hotel with no public access during this period. In 2019, the hotel was ranked 11th of the top 25 properties in Sri Lanka in Tripadvisor's Travellers' Choice Awards. The company is managed as a chain hotel of Cinnamon Hotels & Resorts brand and is a subsidiary of Asian Hotels and Properties PLC while John Keells Holdings is the ultimate parent company.

=== COVID-19 pandemic ===
In January 2021, Cinnamon Hotels & Resorts announced the appointment of Kamal Munasinghe as the General Manager of Cinnamon Grand Colombo and Cinnamon Lakeside Colombo. On March 7, 2021, the health authorities have permitted to resume operations during the COVID-19 pandemic, earlier a few staff members have contracted the virus while off duty. The company launched "Flavours by Cinnamon", an online food ordering platform in April 2021. The Cinnamon Hotels launched the "Meals that Heal" program, a food donation initiative with the help of the Sri Lanka Police. Under this program, the company will distribute 2,000 food packs daily for 14 days to the community the company operates.

== Amenities ==
The hotel has 346 rooms with 20 suites and eight restaurants: Royal Thai, Long Feng, the Library, ColomBar, Goodies, Pool Bar, and The Lounge. The hotel also houses the largest swimming pool in Colombo, tennis and squash courts and a gymnasium. In 2012, the hotel launched the 8° on the lake, a floating event venue on the Beira Lake. The venue could accommodate 100 guests at a time.

== See also ==
- List of hotels in Sri Lanka
