= Cinnamon Hotels & Resorts =

Sri Lankan luxury hotel chain

- Formerly: John Keells Hotels
- Type: Subsidiary
- Industry: Leisure
- Founded: 1979; 47 years ago
- Headquarters: No. 117, Sir Chittampalam A. Gardiner Mawatha, Colombo, Sri Lanka
- Area served: Sri Lanka; Maldives
- Key people: Hishan Singhawansa (CEO)
- Services: Luxury hotels; Resorts
- Parent: John Keells Holdings
- Website: www.cinnamonhotels.com

Cinnamon Hotels & Resorts is a Sri Lankan luxury hotel and resorts chain which is the leisure sector of John Keells Holdings.

== History ==
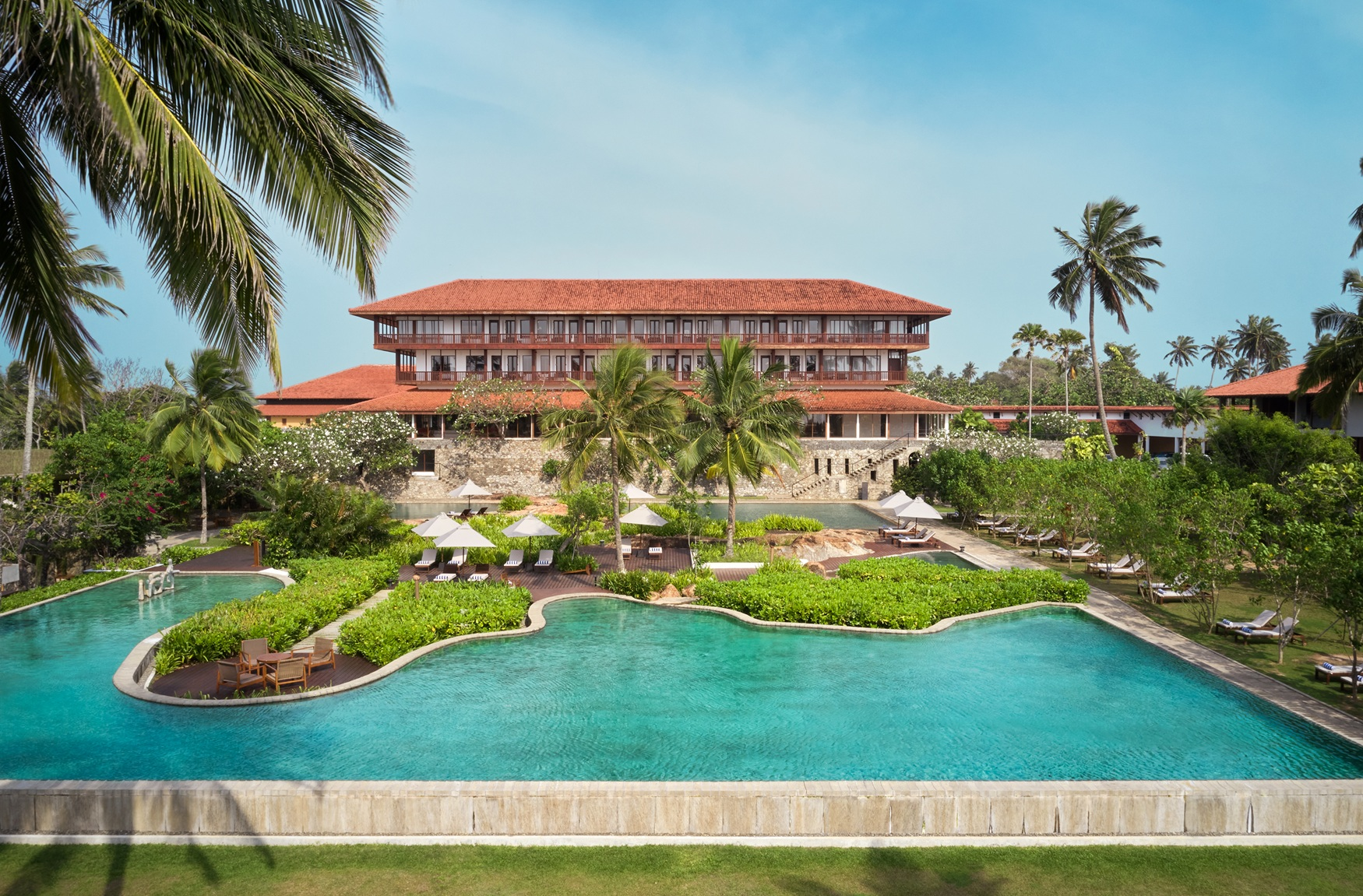
Cinnamon Bentota Beach

=== Development ===
John Keells Hotels was launched in 1979 as Keells Hotels Limited and in 2004, was listed in Colombo Stock Exchange as John Keells Hotels PLC. The brand Cinnamon Hotels & Resorts launched in London in 2005 and all hotels were brought under the brand name in 2014. In 2019, Cinnamon Bentota Beach was refurbished and the fourth resort in the Maldives, Cinnamon Velifushi Maldives established.

=== 2019 Easter bombings ===
On 21 April 2019, Easter Sunday, The Cinnamon Grand was targeted by the suicide bombers along with the Shangri-La Colombo and The Kingsbury hotels. Around 9:10 am the perpetrator went to the breakfast buffet at the Taprobane restaurant and set off the bomb in his backpack, killing twenty people. Four staff members at the Taprobane restaurant died in the suicide bombing and three foreign guests, (British, Dutch and American nationals) were also killed. BBC reported another eleven years old guest was also killed.

== Ownership ==
John Keells Hotels manages a portfolio of holdings that consists of hotel businesses, which collectively form the John Keells Hotels Group. Asian Hotels and Properties PLC, a sister company of John Keells Hotels, operates Cinnamon Grand Hotel and Crescat Boulevard shopping mall and high-end apartments while Trans-Asia Hotels PLC, a subsidiary of Asian Hotels and Properties, manages Cinnamon Lakeside.

== Properties ==
The brand manages 15 four-star and five-star hotels across Sri Lanka and the Maldives. These hotels collectively exceed the room capacity of over 1,400. BOI signed an agreement worth US$29.3 with Indra Hotels and Resorts Kandy, a joint venture by Indra Traders and John Keells Hotels to build a 160-room hotel in Kandy. The project is expected to be completed by 2022 and will be named Cinnamon Red Kandy.

== See also ==
- Amaya Resorts & Spas, a rival hotel chain in Sri Lanka
