= Ceylon Cold Stores =

Sri Lankan food and drink company

- Elephant House logo
- Trade name: Elephant House
- Company type: Public Subsidiary
- Traded as: CSE: CCS.N0000
- ISIN: LK0027N00009
- Industry: Food; Beverage
- Predecessor: Colombo Ice Company; New Colombo Ice Company
- Founded: 1866; 160 years ago
- Founder: Arthur Kurt Von Possner
- Headquarters: Colombo, Sri Lanka
- Area served: International
- Key people: Krishan Balendra (Chairman)
- Products: Beverages; Frozen confectionery; Processed meats
- Brands: Elephant House
- Revenue: ▲LKR126.149 billion (2023)
- Operating income: ▲LKR6.185 billion (2023)
- Net income: ▲LKR2.512 billion (2023)
- Total assets: ▲LKR71.730 billion (2023)
- Total equity: ▲LKR19.077 billion (2023)
- Owners: John Keells Holdings (70.66%); Whittall Boustead (Private) Ltd (10.7%)
- Number of employees: ▲7,568 (2023)
- Parent: John Keells Holdings
- Subsidiaries: JayKay Marketing Services (100%)
- Website: www.elephanthouse.lk

Ceylon Cold Stores (CCS), trading as Elephant House, is a Sri Lankan company which produces carbonated drinks, ice cream and processed meat products. Despite competition from global competitors such as Coca-Cola and Pepsi, Elephant Soft Drinks remains the market leader in Sri Lanka.

== History ==
Ceylon Cold Stores was established in 1866 as the Colombo Ice Company, which in 1863 imported the country's first ice-making machine. With an initial capital of £1,600, two steam engines of 8 and 9 horsepower, and a total of 22 employees, the company started producing ice on a commercial scale. The company's first premises were located on Glennie Street, Slave Island and its popular name 'Ice Kompaniya' was used locally to identify the area, Kompaniveediya. German engineer Arthur Kurt Von Possner (1833–1900), who was the first manager of the company, introduced aerated water with the distinctive "Elephant" trademark on the bottles, which later became "Elephant House" and since that time has remained as the household name for the brand. The company initially produced two types of carbonated drinks: soda and lemonade, both of which compared favourably at the time in international fairs in Melbourne and Calcutta, where they won awards.

In 1880 the Colombo Ice Company acquired the business and goodwill of J. Maitland, who owned a medical hall which sold a variety of medicated wine.

The company, however, went into liquidation. Tom Walker headed a syndicate that bought Colombo Ice Company, forming a new company under the name New Colombo Ice Company on 8 May 1894. In 1910 the New Colombo Ice Company bought the business and plant of one of its main competitors, the Galle Face Ice Company, from J. P. Motten for Rs. 45,000. In 1919, the company acquired Von Possners British Aerated and Mineral Water Company for Rs. 175,000.

In 1923, the company purchased a new ice manufacturing plant which was driven by an internal combustion engine replacing its old ten-ton steam-driven plant.

By 1925, the company moved on to build cold storage for frozen products of all kinds, opening new cold stores in Colombo on 1 December 1928, the same year the company purchased another smaller rival, the Pure Ice and Aerated Waters Manufactory. In 1932, Ceylon Creameries Limited was acquired to produce and distribute reconstituted fresh milk and ice cream. In 1934 the New Colombo Ice Company purchased Ceylon Ice and Cold Storage Company for Rs 850,000. A carbonic acid gas plant was installed in 1935 to make carbon dioxide and dry ice. With the purchase of a bread-making machine and a modern oven, bread was baked and sold by the company.

In 1941, New Colombo Ice Company changed its name to Ceylon Cold Stores Limited. In 1964 Mallory Wijesinghe became its first Ceylonese chairman. In January 1970 the company was listed on the Colombo Stock Exchange. Ceylon Cold Stores came under the umbrella of John Keells Holdings Limited with the acquisition of the Whittalls Group in 1991 (John Keells Holdings has a 54% majority shareholding in the company).

In 1998 the company enhanced its production capacity considerably by installing a modern bottling plant at the Kaduwela factory. In 2007 John Keells Holdings reinvested close to one billion rupees in the installation of a state of the art factory line.
