= Dipped Products =

Rubber glove manufacturer in Sri Lanka

Dipped Products PLC
- Logo of Dipped Products PLC
- Type: Public
- Traded as: CSE: DIPD.N0000; S&P Sri Lanka 20 Index component
- ISIN: LK0057N00006
- Industry: Materials
- Founded: 1976; 50 years ago
- Headquarters: Colombo, Sri Lanka
- Areas served: Sri Lanka; Thailand; Italy; France; Poland
- Key people: Mohan Pandithage (Chairman); Pushpika Janadheera (Managing Director)
- Revenue: ▲LKR80.099 billion (2023)
- Operating income: ▲LKR11.219 billion (2023)
- Net income: ▲LKR8.502 billion (2023)
- Total assets: ▲LKR62.991 billion (2023)
- Total equity: ▲LKR33.515 billion (2023)
- Owners: Hayleys (42.12%); Volanka (Pvt) Ltd (8.14%); Haycarb (6.80%)
- Number of employees: ▲2,245 (2023)
- Parent: Hayleys PLC
- Subsidiaries: See text
- Website: dplgroup.com

Dipped Products PLC is a rubber glove manufacturer in Sri Lanka. The company also manages rubber and tea plantations. The company was incorporated in 1976 and listed on the Colombo Stock Exchange in 1983. The company is one of the components of the S&P Sri Lanka 20 Index. Sri Lankan conglomerate, Hayleys is the effective controlling shareholder of Dipped Products. The company was ranked 26th in LMD 100, an annual list of quoted companies in Sri Lanka by revenue.

== History ==
The company was incorporated in 1976 as Dipped Products Ltd and commenced trial production in the following year. Dipped Products became a public company when it is listed on the Colombo Stock Exchange in 1983. The company expanded its production capacity in successive years since its incorporation. Management of Kelani Valley Plantations was awarded by the government in 1992 and in 1995 the company acquired it. The company expanded overseas with Icoguanti S.p.A., Italy in 2002 and Dipped Products (Thailand) in 2003. In 2011, Dipped Products acquired 66.7% of the ownership of Hayleys Plantation Services which is the holding company of Talawakelle Tea Estates PLC. The company recorded its highest-ever revenue in 2021 with a revenue of LKR46.39 billion.

== Operations ==
Dipped Products is one of the five leading non-medical rubber glove manufacturers in the world. The company's market share of the global market accounts for 5%. Upon declaration of the COVID-19 pandemic, the World Health Organization requested to increase the production of personal protective equipment (PPE) by 40% from the industry and the governments. Gloves were on the list of this request and it created both an opportunity and a challenge for the company. Dipped Products have five manufacturing facilities, four in Sri Lanka and one in Thailand. In 2022, the company announced that they are venturing into sports and mechanic gloves production. To this effect, the company invested an LKR1 billion to construct a new manufacturing facility in Biyagama Export Processing Zone as a BOI project.

Dipped Products benefitted from the diverted orders after the United States ban on imports from two subsidiaries of Top Glove on charges of forced labour. The company's 2021 second-quarter earnings declined due to sharp rise in transportation and administrative costs.

=== Controversies ===
In 2014, Dipped Products moved its Venigros factory in Weliweriya to Biyagama after the factory was forced to close after protests by the local residents. In 2015, a factory of Dipped Products was embroiled in allegations of pollution lawsuit. The Police filed a lawsuit against Hanwella Rubber Products Ltd and the Avissawell High Court upheld the verdict of the magistrate court allowing the factory to continue with its operations.

=== Subsidiaries ===
Hayleys Plantation Services, a sub-subsidiary of Dipped Products PLC by DPL Plantations acquired a 51% stake in Horana Plantations PLC from Vallibel Plantations Management Ltd for LKR700 million in March 2023.

Subsidiary	Holding %	Cost LKR (mns)	Country
Dipped Products (Thailand) Ltd	99	1,209	Thailand
DPL Plantations (Pvt) Ltd	100	550	Sri Lanka
D P L Premier Gloves Ltd	100	1,450	Sri Lanka
D P L Universal Gloves Ltd	100	3,500	Sri Lanka
Feltex (Pvt) Ltd	100	15	Sri Lanka
Hanwella Rubber Products Ltd	73	152	Sri Lanka
ICOGUANTI S.p.A.	100	625	Italy
Venigros (Pvt) Ltd	100	202	Sri Lanka

Source: Annual Report, 2022/23 (p. 176)

== See also ==
- List of companies listed on the Colombo Stock Exchange
- List of Sri Lankan public corporations by market capitalisation
