= Crescat Boulevard =

Shopping mall in Sri Lanka

- Location: Kollupitiya, Sri Lanka
- Address: No 89, Galle Road, Colombo-03
- Manager: Asian Hotels and Properties, a subsidiary of John Keells Holdings
- Num. of stores: 2
- Floors: 3

Crescat Boulevard also popularly known as Crescat is a Sri Lankan shopping mall which is located in Western Province, Kollupitiya, Colombo near the St. Thomas' Preparatory School and Crescat Residencies adjoining the Cinnamon Grand Colombo. It is a two-storeyed shopping mall consisting of three floors and it is one of the most popular shopping malls in Colombo.

The shopping mall consists of bookstores, boutiques, designer shops, a food court, cafes and a supermarket. The basement floor is split between a food court and a large supermarket. The second floor consists of a cafe, a bookshop, body shops and clothing retail stores. The third floor consists of a cafe, fashion shops, perfumes and accessories shops.

== See also ==
- Lotus Tower
