= Cinnamon Grand Colombo =

Hotel in Colombo, Sri Lanka

- Logo of Cinnamon Grand Colombo

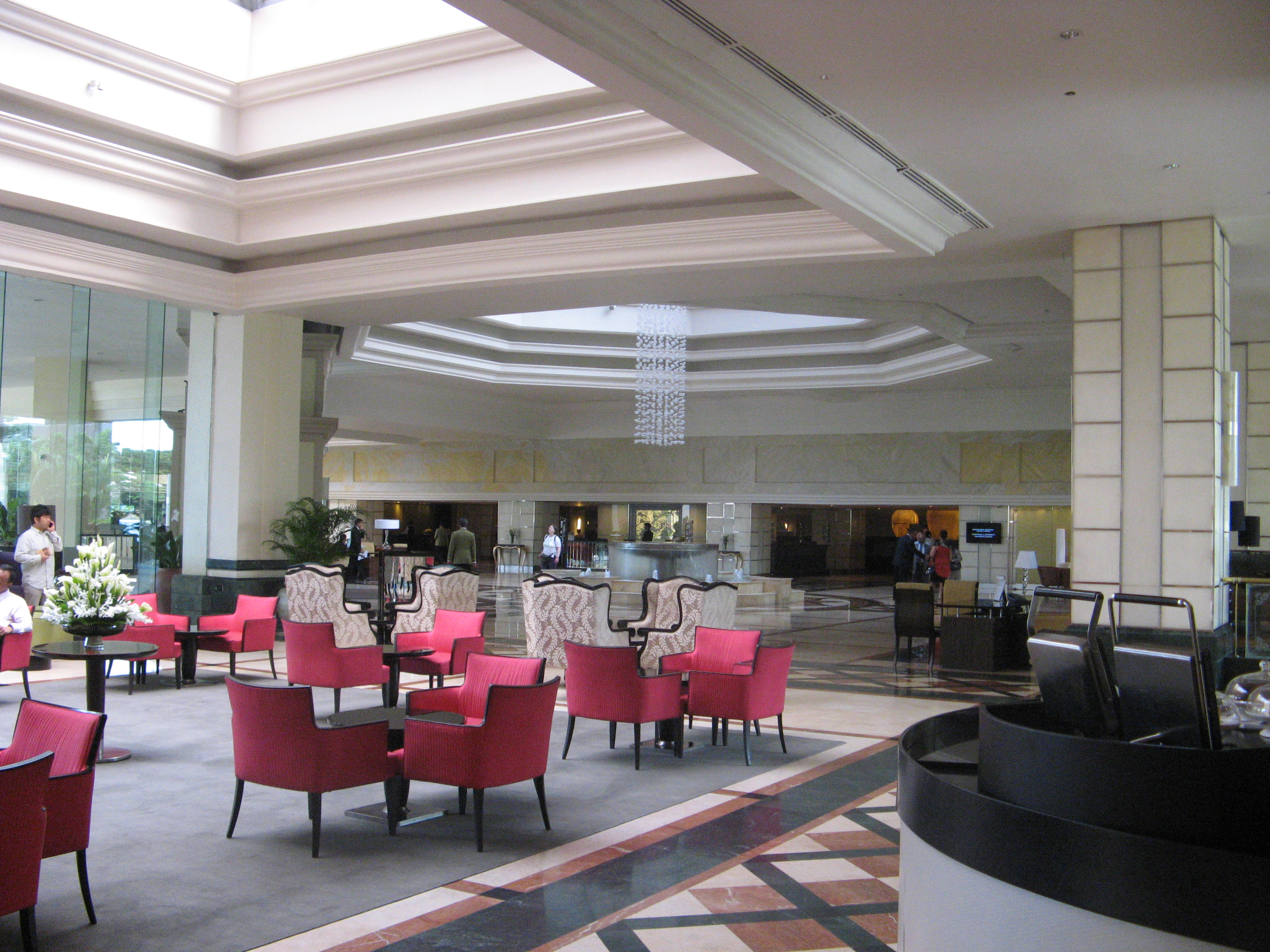
- The foyer of the Cinnamon Grand
- Former names: Hotel Lanka Oberoi
- Hotel chain: Cinnamon Hotels & Resorts

General information
- Type: Hotel
- Location: 77 Galle Road, Colombo, Sri Lanka
- Coordinates: 6.9178°N 79.8484°E
- Opened: 1975; 51 years ago

Other information
- Number of rooms: 475
- Number of suites: 26
- Number of restaurants: 7
- Number of bars: 2

Website
- www.cinnamonhotels.com/cinnamongrandcolombo
- Type: Public
- Traded as: CSE: AHPL.N0000
- ISIN: LK0341N00004
- Key people: Krishan Balendra (Chairman/Managing Director)
- Revenue: ▲LKR8,417 million (2023)
- Operating income: ▲LKR93 million (2023)
- Net income: ▲LKR(332) million (2023)
- Total assets: ▲LKR45,911 million (2023)
- Total equity: ▼LKR32,237 million (2023)
- Number of employees: ▲1,390 (2023)
- Parent: John Keells Holdings (78.56%)
- Subsidiaries: Trans Asia Hotels PLC

The Cinnamon Grand Colombo is a luxury five-star hotel in Colombo, Sri Lanka.

== History ==
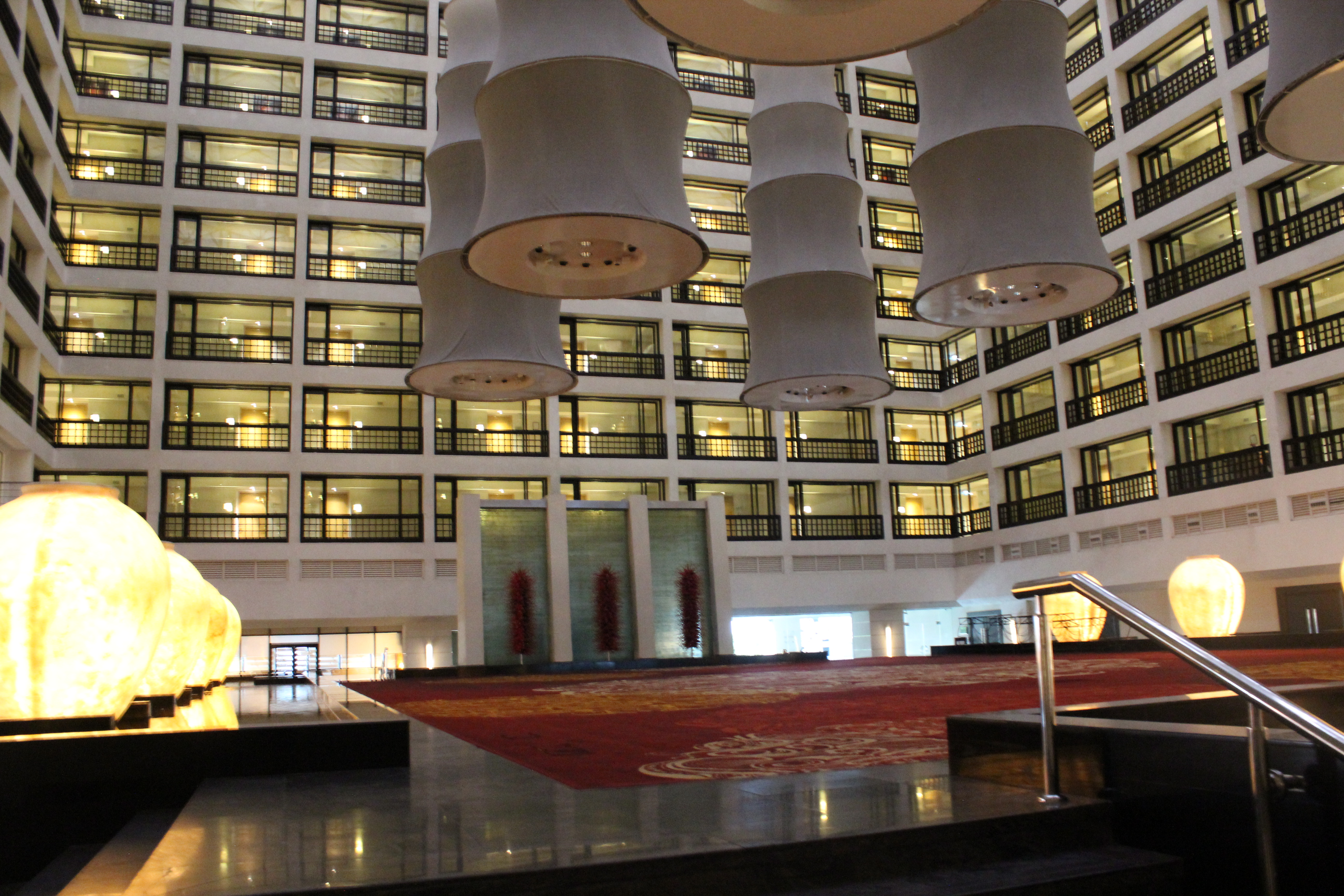
Atrium of the Cinnamon Grand

The Hotel Lanka Oberoi was designed by Skidmore, Owings & Merrill and opened in 1975. It was the first Oberoi Hotels property outside India. The hotel was constructed on the site of the residence of the Bishop of the Church of Ceylon.

On 28 January 1984, a bomb exploded in the Lanka Oberoi, killing one employee. Oberoi Hotels terminated their management contract with Asian Hotels, the owner of the hotel, in 2003, and it was renamed the Colombo Plaza Hotel. That same year, John Keells Holdings acquired a controlling stake of 60.5% of Asian Hotels Ltd, for LKR4.1 billion. John Keells Holdings rebranded the hotel as the Cinnamon Grand Hotel in 2005.

=== 2019 Sri Lanka Easter bombings ===
On 21 April 20, the hotel was one of the sites targeted in a coordinated string of terrorist bombings on Easter Sunday.

The Cinnamon Grand was targeted by suicide bombers, along with the Shangri-La Colombo and The Kingsbury hotels. Around 9:10 am, the perpetrator went to the breakfast buffet at the Taprobane restaurant and set off the bomb in his backpack, killing twenty people. Four staff members at the Taprobane restaurant died in the suicide bombing and three foreign guests, (British, Dutch and American nationals) were also killed. BBC reported another eleven-year-old guest was also killed.

Radhika Sarathkumar, a popular Sri Lankan-born Indian Tamil actress, narrowly escaped from the bomb explosion at the hotel, where she was present after wrapping up shooting for a film.

== Amenities ==
The hotel houses eight restaurants and bars. These include the Plates, the all day dining restaurant, Lagoon, a seafood restaurant, Nuga Gama, a Sri Lankan restaurant; London Grill, a steakhouse; Cheers Pub, The Coffee Stop serving freshly baked cakes and snacks, Breeze Bar by the poolside and the Tea Lounge at the lobby. Other amenities include, two gyms, two pools, one outside, one on the rooftop; and saunas.

== See also ==
- List of hotels in Sri Lanka
