= Arpico Super Centre =

Supermarket in Sri Lanka

- Type: Department store
- Industry: Retail
- Headquarters: No 310. High Level Road, Maharagama, Sri Lanka
- Number of locations: 25 (2017)
- Area served: Sri Lanka
- Key people: Sena Yaddehige; Susantha Pathirana; Lakshman Watawala; Mr. Paul Ratnayaka; Mr.Sunil Liyanage
- Products: Supermarket; Hypermarket; Superstore
- Owner: Richard Pieris & Company
- Website: arpicosupercentre.com

Arpico Super Centre also popularly simply known as Arpico is a chain of supermarkets which is also regarded as a departmental store located in Sri Lanka owned by Richard Pieris & Company. The retail shopping mall was initially started with the concept of supermarket and then transformed its business operations as a supercentre. It is one of the three largest retail operators on the island, alongside Cargills Food City and Keells Super. Arpico Super Centre is also regarded as one of the two most popular departmental stores in Sri Lanka along with ODEL. The Richard Pieris & Company, pioneered the concept of hypermarkets in Sri Lanka through their Arpico Super Centre chain. The store sells various types of goods in different sections under the building's roof and the headquarters is situated at Maharagama in High Level Road.

The Arpico Super Centre's 20th showroom branch was opened at Kohuwala in 2017 with the concept of green products.

== See also ==
- List of supermarket chains in Asia
