= Keells =

Chain of supermarkets in Sri Lanka

Keells Supermarket

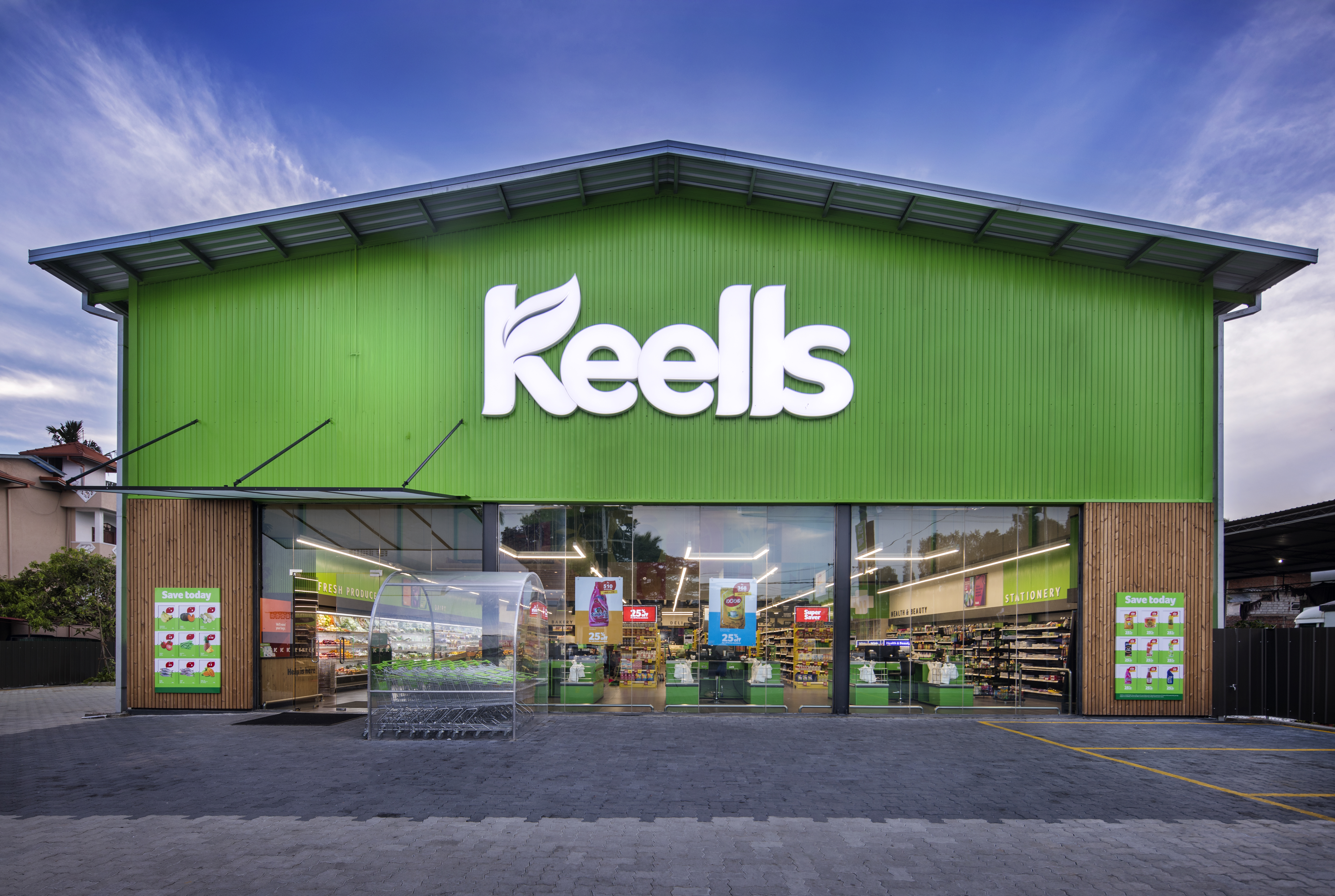
- Trade name: Keells
- Native name: කීල්ස්
- Type: Private Limited Company
- Industry: Retail
- Founded: 1991; 35 years ago in Colombo, Sri Lanka
- Founder: Ceylon Cold Stores
- Headquarters: 148, Vauxhall Street, Colombo 02, Colombo, Sri Lanka
- Number of locations: 135 (2024)
- Area served: Sri Lanka
- Key people: Charitha Subasinghe (President-Retail)
- Products: Groceries; Household Essentials; Fresh Produce; Prepared Meals & Snacks; Bakery; Imported products; Keells Own-label products
- Services: Online grocer; Click & Collect Services; Utility Bill Payments; Nexus Loyalty Program
- Owner: Jaykay Marketing Services (Pvt) Ltd
- Number of employees: 5000 (2024)
- Parent: John Keells Holdings PLC
- Website: www.keellssuper.com

Keells is a Sri Lankan supermarket chain operated by Jaykay Marketing Services (Pvt) Ltd., a subsidiary of the John Keells Group. Established in 1991, Keells has grown to operate 135 outlets across the country, positioning itself as one of the leading retail chains in Sri Lanka alongside other retailers such as Cargills, Glomark, Spar , and Arpico. The company is headquartered in Colombo 2, Sri Lanka, and offers a wide range of products, including fresh produce, groceries, bakery items, and ready-to-eat meals.

The company employs over 5,000 people and works closely with local farmers and suppliers, sourcing fresh produce through 9 collection centers distributed across the country. These products are then managed through a 260,000-square-foot distribution center, which allows Keells to ensure that fresh produce reaches stores within 24 hours. The supermarket chain also operates 130 SLSI-certified bakeries, providing fresh bakery products, and 66 GMP-certified hot kitchens, offering a variety of ready-to-eat meals.

Keells has developed an extensive own-label product range, offering over 300 items alongside more than 200 imported products. In 2002, the company became the first supermarket in Sri Lanka to launch an online grocery shopping platform, offering services such as home delivery and click-and-collect options.

The Nexus loyalty program, with a membership exceeding 2.4 million, enhances customer engagement by offering discounts and deals to shoppers. As part of its sustainability efforts, 107 Keells stores now utilize solar power, contributing approximately 30% of their energy needs. The company is committed to reducing its environmental footprint through these initiatives. Brand Finance ranked Keells as the most valuable supermarket brand in 2022, with the brand value of Keells estimated at LKR 28 billion.
