= Chinabank =

Filipino commercial bank

China Banking Corporation

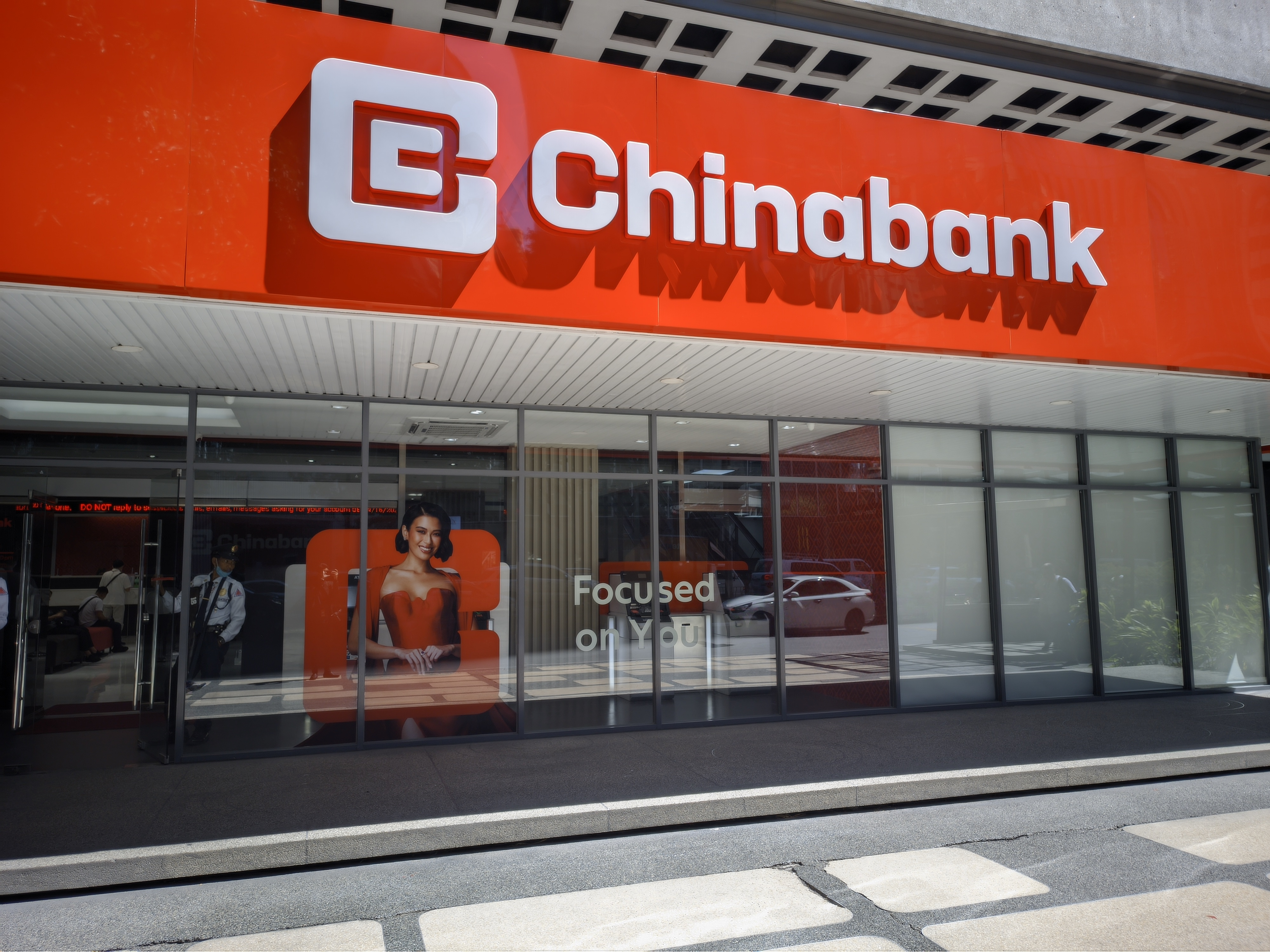
- Chinabank's main branch in Makati
- Native name: 菲律宾中兴银行
- Type: Public
- Traded as: PSE: CBC
- Industry: Finance
- Founded: August 16, 1920; 105 years ago in Manila, Philippine Islands
- Headquarters: Chinabank Building, 8745 Paseo de Roxas corner Villar Street, Makati, Philippines
- Number of locations: 648 branches 1,069 ATMs (2023)
- Key people: Hans T. Sy, Sr. (Chairman); Gilbert U. Dee (Vice Chairman); Romeo D. Uyan, Jr. (President and CEO)
- Services: Banking
- Revenue: ₱79.9 billion (2023)
- Operating income: ₱54.0 billion (2023)
- Net income: ₱22.0 billion (2023)
- Total assets: ₱1.5 trillion (2023)
- Total equity: ₱150.0 billion (2023)
- Number of employees: 10,662 (2023)
- Website: www.chinabank.ph

China Banking Corporation, (Note: simplified Chinese: 中兴银行; traditional Chinese: 中興銀行; pinyin: Zhōngxīng Yínháng; Pe̍h-ōe-jī: Tiong-heng Gûn-hâng; PSE: CBC) doing business as Chinabank, is a Filipino local commercial bank established in 1920.

China Banking Corporation was the first privately owned local commercial bank in the Philippines, initially catering to the banking needs of Chinese Filipino businesspeople. It offers various banking services and products related to deposit, investment, trust, cash management, remittance, and financing products and services. It also offers insurance brokerage, stock brokerage, capital markets, and bancassurance services through its subsidiaries and affiliate.

Chinabank is the fourth largest private universal bank in the Philippines. It was named by The Asset as the Best Bank in the Philippines in 2021 and by the People Management Association of the Philippines as the 2023 Employer of the Year.

Chinabank is also one of the best-governed publicly listed companies. It was recognized by the ASEAN Capital Markets Forum (ACMF) as among the Top 20 ASEAN Publicly Listed Companies, as an ASEAN Asset Class, and as one of the Top 3 Publicly Listed Companies in the Philippines, and by the Institute of Corporate Directors, as a Five-Golden Arrow awardee for the bank's corporate governance excellence.

== History ==
=== Beginnings ===
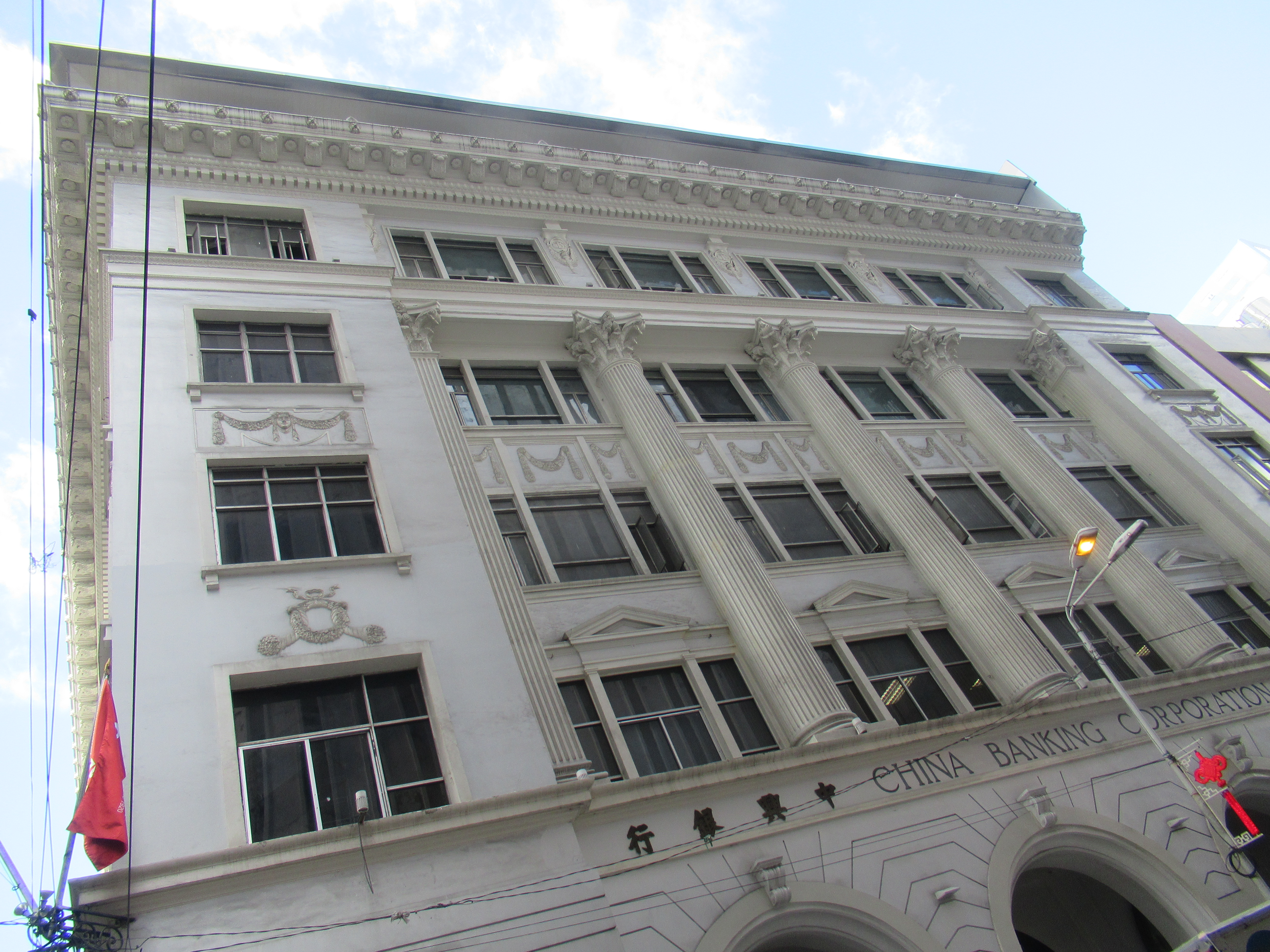
China Banking Corporation Building, the bank's former headquarters in Juan Luna corner Dasmariñas Streets, Binondo, Manila

Chinabank, founded by Dee C. Chuan, Albino SyCip, Guillermo A. CuUnjieng, Sr., Carlos T. Palanca, Sr. and other visionaries, opened its first office at Rosario (now Quintin Paredes) Street, Binondo on August 16, 1920, with J.W. McFerran as the first general manager. Shortly afterward, Eugene E. Wing of the International Banking Corporation took over and managed China Bank's operations until 1936. This mixture of cultures represented a seamless merger of Western and Eastern banking policies—an obvious lack during those days when financial institutions governed by Western policies declined credit loans of wealthy Filipino-Chinese businesspeople who operated on the principle of xìnyong (Hokkien Chinese: 信用; Pe̍h-ōe-jī: sìn-iōng) or trustworthiness. Chinabank recognized the value of xìnyong and granted small loans and opened credit accounts with patrons and suppliers without demand for collateral. In 1924, the company completed its headquarters in Binondo. In September 1927, only a month after the country opened its first stock exchange, Chinabank made history as one of the first companies to publicly list on the Manila Stock Exchange.

Chinabank later opened two overseas branches in China, one in Amoy in 1925 and another in Shanghai in 1929. However, both branches closed in 1944 when political conditions in China became inimical to operations.

When the Japanese occupational forces invaded Manila in 1942, Chinabank closed. However, by the end of 1941, the Bank had been making steady deposits and turning over assets to the United States High Commissioner to the Philippines Francis Bowes Sayre Sr. for safekeeping, with the help of the officials of the US Treasury Department of Manila. With these overseas assets and the Bureau of Banking's full cooperation, Chinabank reopened in 1945.

Chinabank played a key role in post-World War II reconstruction and recovery through its support to businesses and entrepreneurs in critical industries. It opened its first branch outside Manila in Cebu in 1949. In 1969, China Bank computerized its operations, becoming the first bank in Southeast Asia to process deposit accounts online. On the same year, its new headquarters, the 15-storey China Bank Building in Makati, was completed. China Bank upgraded its online system in 1988 and launched the TellerCard ATM account and TellerPhone, the first telephone banking service in the Philippines. In 1990, China Bank, along with seven other banks, set up BancNet, currently the country's largest ATM network.

In 1991, Chinabank acquired its universal bank license, ushering an era of expanded banking operations. It launched its consumer loans in 1994, HomePlus Loan and AutoPlus Loan, followed by China Check Plus, an interest-earning checking account in 1996. In the same year, Chinabank accessed offshore capital markets for the first time by issuing US$50-million Floating Rate Certificate of Deposit (FRCD).

As Chinabank invested in new technologies, it launched its Cash Management services in 2004, followed by internet banking and remittance services in 2006. In the same year, with 146 branches at the time, it embarked on an aggressive branch network expansion program.

=== Growth through the years ===
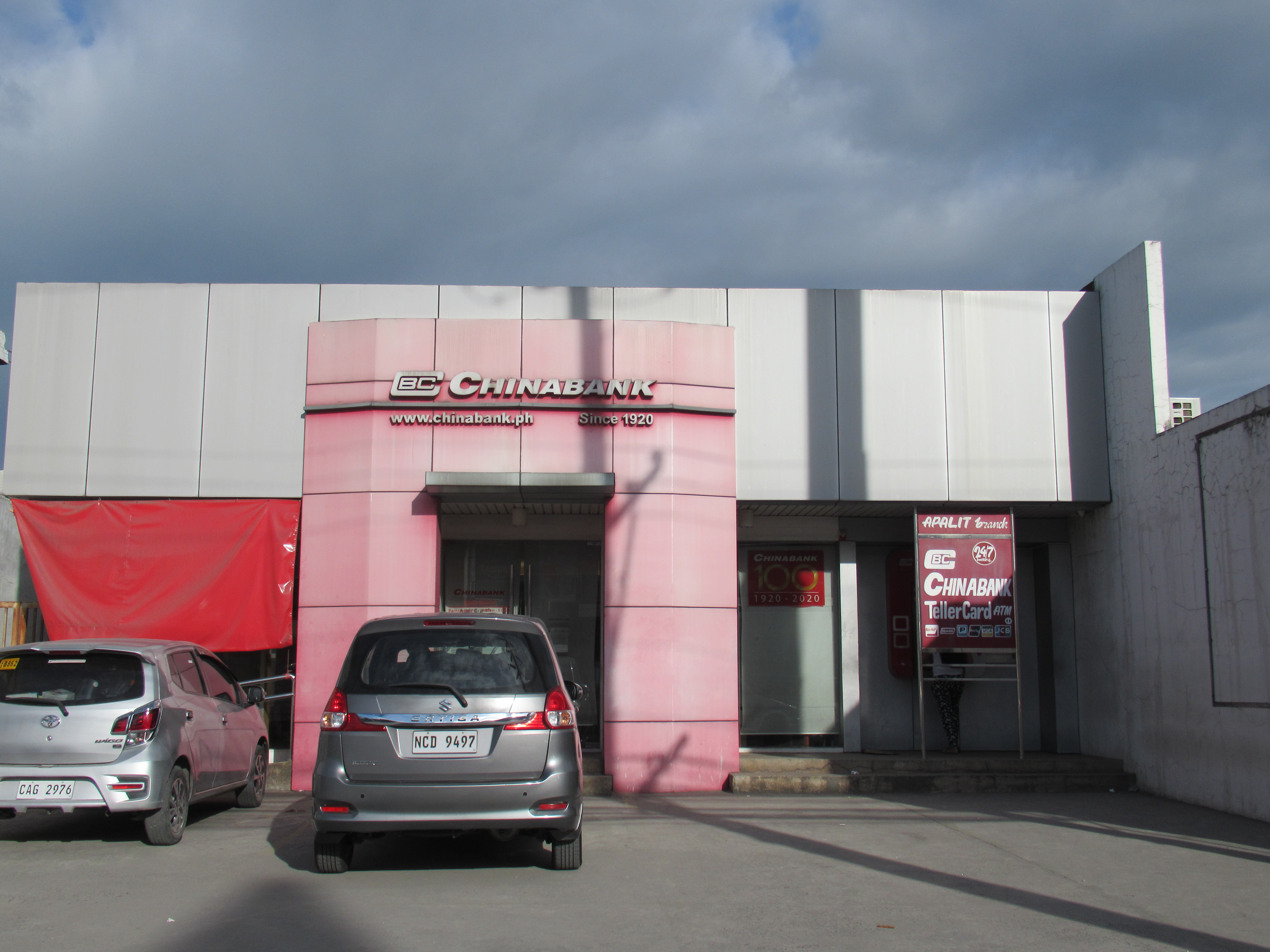
A Chinabank branch in Apalit, Pampanga

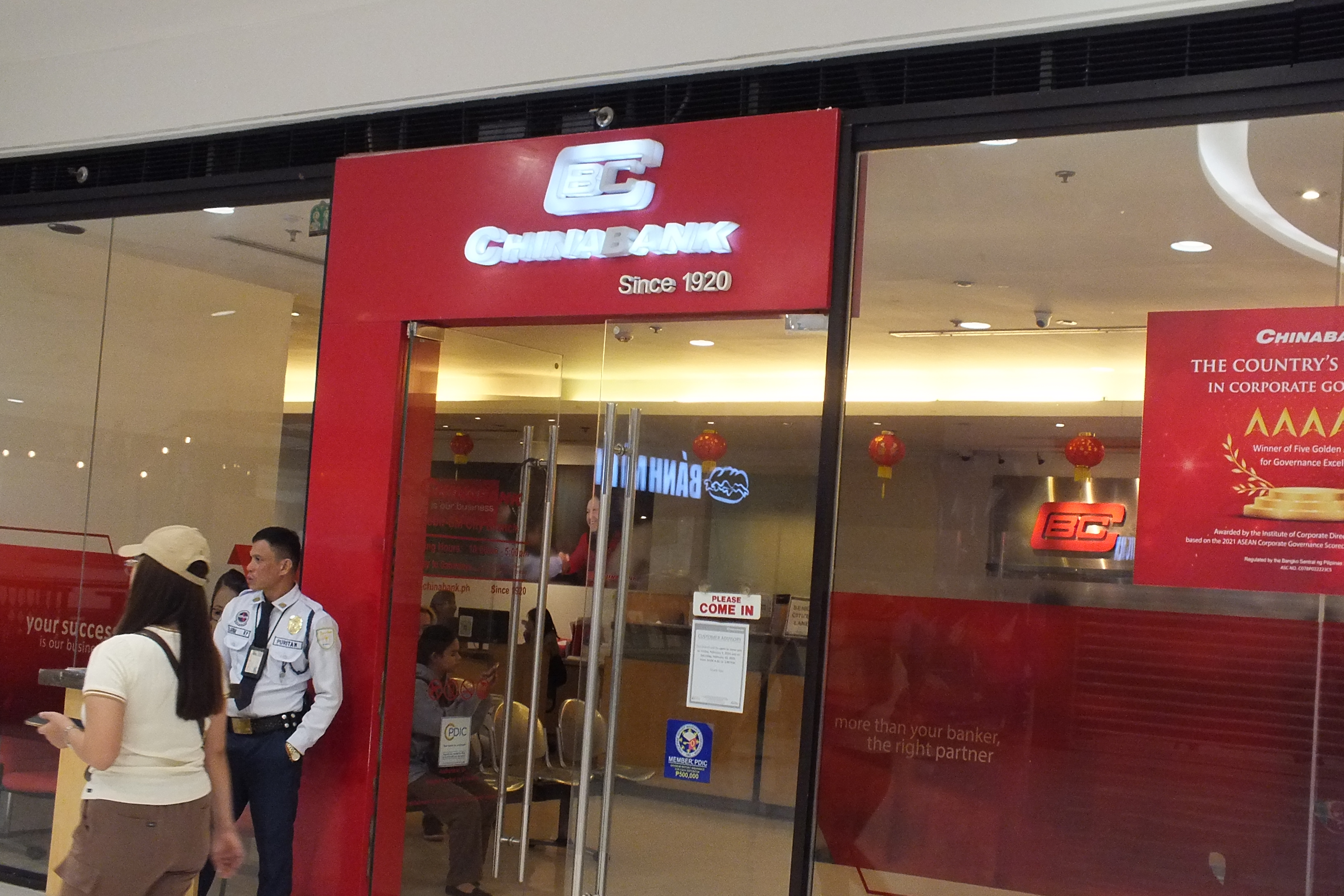
A Chinabank branch at SM City Cebu

Chinabank has been involved in strategic alliances to expand and strengthen its operations. In 2007, it entered into a Bancassurance joint venture with the Manulife, one of the leading insurance companies in the world, to form Manulife China Bank Life Assurance Corporation (MCBLife), and acquired the majority shares in Manila Bank, one of the oldest savings banks in the country.

In 2008, Chinabank's thrift bank subsidiary China Bank Savings (CBS) began operations. Positioned to be an alternative to traditional banking, CBS targets entry level and start-up customers to asset accumulators, offering products and services that match different life stages, like basic deposit products for those building up their savings, basic loan products to fund personal dreams, and investment products. In 2012, Chinabank acquired Pampanga-based Unity Bank, which was merged with CBS in 2014. In the same year, Chinabank acquired Planters Development Bank (Plantersbank).

To complete its range of product offerings, Chinabank entered into a credit card partnership with Mastercard in 2013, initially launching three credit card types: Chinabank Prime, Chinabank Platinum, Chinabank World MasterCard. The bank expanded its credit card offerings with Chinabank Cash Rewards Mastercard and Chinabank Freedom Mastercard in 2021 and with Chinabank Destinations Mastercard in 2023.

=== Centennial ===
Logo from 1995 to 2017

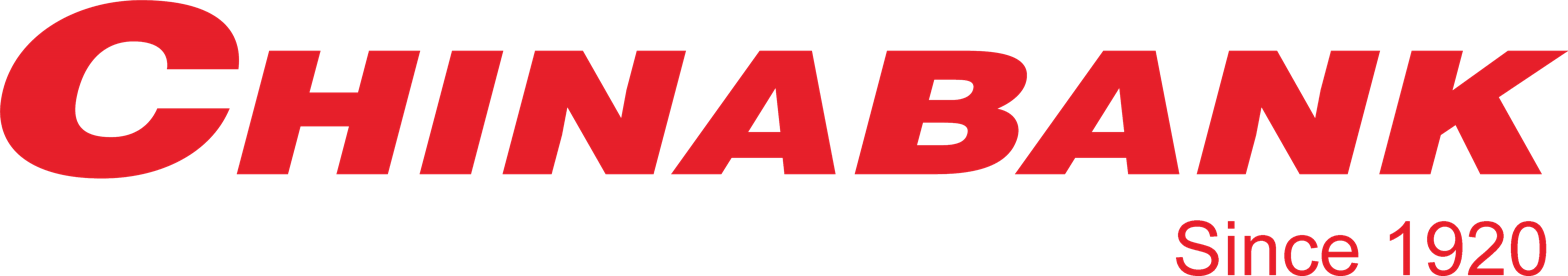
Logo from 2017 to 2024, without the CBC monogram

Chinabank reached its 100-year milestone in 2020. The centerpiece of its centennial celebration was the restoration of its original headquarters, which began in 2018. With construction delays due to the pandemic, the restored building was inaugurated in 2021. It bears the historical marker of the National Historical Commission of the Philippines and the Important Cultural Property marker of the National Museum of the Philippines. The bank also approved the Centennial Stock Grant Plan wherein regular employees of the Chinabank Group as of August 16, 2020 were entitled to 100 Chinabank shares for each year of service. This was ratified by the stockholders during the 2020 virtual Special Stockholders’ Meeting.

=== Brand refresh ===
Right before its 105th year of operation, Chinabank modernized its brand and image in 2024, signing up its first ever brand ambassador Miss Universe Philippines 2023 Michelle Dee and launching a new logo and digital campaign. Their new logo was a stylized “CBC” monogram and their new tagline was “Focused on You”, which was also the title of its new jingle and digital campaign.

On June 19, 2024, at the Philippine Stock Exchange bell ringing ceremony led by Chair Hans T. Sy and Chair José T. Pardo, Chinabank's stock symbol was rebranded to "CBC" from "CHIB".

== Subsidiaries and affiliates ==
Chinabank has the following subsidiaries and affiliates:

- CBS
- Chinabank Capital
- Chinabank Securities
- Chinabank Properties & Computer Center
- Resurgent Capital
- Chinabank Insurance Brokers
- Manulife China Bank Life Assurance

== Shareholding structure ==
- Publicly owned: 56.832%
- Principal/substantial stockholders: 37.9859%
- Directors: 2.3778%
- Officers: 0.8247%
- Others: 1.9796%
