= Pannala =

- Pannala
- Coordinates: 7°19′41″N 80°1′27″E
- Country: Sri Lanka
- Province: North Western Province, Sri Lanka
- Time zone: UTC+5:30 (Sri Lanka Standard Time)
- Postal code: 60160

Pannala is a town in Kurunegala District, North Western Province, Sri Lanka. it is located on Kurunegala-Negombo main road, (away from Negombo 25 km and away from Kurunegala 45 km), and away from Kuliyapitiya17 km. The newly constructed bridge on "Maha Oya" connects Pannala to Divulapitiya in Western Province. It is very famous for its Racing Track. Pannala Industrial zone is located a few kilometres off the town which includes Keells Food Products, Brandix textiles, Nestle Lanka Pannala.

== Education ==
There are a number of schools in Pannala. The main school is Pannala National School. Pannala National school originated as a cooperative school during 1850 - 1960. The Wayamba University of Sri Lanka is located a few miles from the town.

== Notable people ==
- James Goonewardene (1921–1997), Sri Lankan writer
