= Alumex =

Sri Lankan manufacturing company

Alumex PLC
- Alumex PLC logo
- Type: Public
- Traded as: CSE: ALUM.N0000
- ISIN: LK0427N00001
- Industry: Materials
- Founded: 1986; 40 years ago
- Headquarters: Makola, Sri Lanka
- Key people: A. M. Pandithage (Chairman); Pramuk Dediwela (Managing Director)
- Revenue: ▲LKR10,215 million (2023)
- Operating income: ▼LKR(1,790) million (2023)
- Net income: ▼LKR(10) million (2023)
- Total assets: ▼LKR10,518 million (2023)
- Total equity: ▼LKR3,608 million (2023)
- Owners: Hayleys (52.59%); Akbar Brothers (13.39%)
- Number of employees: ▼735 (2023)
- Parent: Hayleys
- Subsidiaries: Alco Industries (Pvt) Ltd (merged with the parent in 2023)
- Website: www.alumexgroup.com

Alumex PLC is the leading fully-integrated manufacturer of aluminium profiles Sri Lanka. The company was incorporated as a South Korean-Sri Lankan joint venture in 1986. The company commenced commercial operations two years later. The Sri Lankan partners acquired the South Korean partner's stake partners in 2006. Sri Lankan conglomerate Hayleys acquired Alumex in 2010 and was listed on the Colombo Stock Exchange after an initial public offering in 2014. Alumex is the leading aluminium manufacturer in Sri Lanka, with a market share of 46%. Alumex is one of the LMD 100 companies in Sri Lanka.

== History ==
The company was incorporated in 1986 as Alumex (Pvt) Ltd, a South Korean-Sri Lankan joint venture. The company commenced operations with a six-inch extruder and an anodizing plant in 1988. Stanley William, who was a founding director of Sampath Bank, was the company's first chairman. In 2000, a seven-inch extruder plant set up in the Makola facility. It is the largest extruder in Sri Lanka. The Sri Lankan partners of the joint venture took control of the South Korean stake in 2006. Hayleys acquired 95% of the stake in Alumex for LKR2.2 billion in 2010. Up until then, Hayleys focused on manufacturing for the overseas market, it was the first time Hayleys acquired a manufacturing company mainly focused on the domestic market. However, Fitch Ratings placed Hayleys on rating watch negative with AA-(lka) rating due to the acquisition being funded by debt facilities.

Below are some key milestones of the evolution of Alumex,

• 1999: First powder coating plant was installed.

• 2008: Modern anodizing plant was installed.

• 2015: Horizontal fully automated powder coating and wood finish plant installed.

• 2021: Value-added manufacturing for the export market commenced.

Alumex (Pvt) Ltd was re-registered as a public company called Alumex Limited in 2013. In March 2014, Alumex announced an initial public offering worth LKR839 million. It was the tenth Hayley's subsidiary to be listed on the Colombo Stock Exchange. In 2018, the company launched a new plant in Ekala built at a cost of LKR2 billion. The plant is fully automated and has an output of 1,000 MT per month.

In 2022, Alumex was able to install a second wood finish plant. Moreover, in the same year it launched "Ozon", Sri Lanka's first low-carbon aluminium brand incorporating environmentally friendly manufacturing technologies.

== Operations ==
Alumex is the leading Aluminium manufacturer in Sri Lanka, with a 46% market share. Alumex's related company Swisstek controls 30% of the market share. Alumex is one of the LMD 100 companies in Sri Lanka. LMD 100, analogous to Fortune 500, lists publicly traded companies in Sri Lanka by revenue. In its 2020/21 edition, Alumex ranked 88th. Alumex won the gold award at the 29th annual National Chamber of Exporters Awards in 2022. The company invested LKR1 billion to increase the capacity in the Sapugaskanda facility. Alumex obtains 50% of its raw materials from recycled aluminium beverage cans.

== Certifications ==
Alumex holds ISO 9001:2015 (Quality Management), ISO 14001:2015 (Environmental Management), and ISO 45001:2018 (Occupational Health & Safety) certifications. The company is also accredited with Qualicoat, Qualanod, and Qualicoat Seaside certifications, ensuring powder coating and anodizing processes meet the highest international standards. All powder-coated and anodized profiles carry a warranty of up to 30 years.

International Markets,

Alumex has successfully expanded into international markets including the United Kingdom, United States, Canada, Australia, New Zealand, Germany, Italy, Singapore, and India, reinforcing its position as a global aluminium industry player.

- List of companies listed on the Colombo Stock Exchange

== Leadership ==
As of 2024, Alumex PLC is chaired by A. M. Pandithage, while Pramuk Dediwela (born in 1968 in Kandy) serves as the Managing Director. Dediwela joined the company in 1989 and was appointed an Executive Director in 2010, Chief Operating Officer in 2017, and Managing Director in July 2018. Under his leadership, Alumex has expanded its manufacturing capacity, entered export markets, and introduced sustainability initiatives including the low-carbon aluminium brand Ozon and the company's Elevate ESG roadmap.
