= James Goonewardene =

Sri Lankan writer (1921–1997)

James Alexander Shedden-Goonewardene (1921–1997) was a Sri Lankan writer. He was born in Pannala, Sri-Lanka, and was raised in Matara, Sri Lanka. He was the son of Mabel Alice Goonewardene and James Robert Shedden, a police inspector serving in the remote town of Pannala, Sri-Lanka. After his birth the family moved to Matara, Sri-Lanka, where they spent several years before moving to Harmer's Avenue in Wellawatte, Colombo. He studied at the University of London. During the 1950s, he began writing stories while working as a school teacher. In 1963, he became a broadcaster for Radio Ceylon while writing skits and dramas for the Sri Lanka Broadcasting Corporation.

James' first novel A Quiet Place was published in 1968, followed by Call of the Kirala in 1971. In 1978, he left broadcasting to devote himself full-time to writing. He published more English language novels than any other Sri-Lankan author. His work suffered some heavy criticism because English was becoming marginalized in the nationalistic passion in Sri-Lanka during the 1960s and the 1971 JVP Insurrection. He was the first Sri-Lankan author to have a novel published by Penguin India and has received retroactive acclaim.

James was married to an Australian national named Sonia. He had no children and died in 1997.

== Bibliography ==
- The Tribal Hangover (1995)
- One Mad Bid for Freedon (1990)
- An Asian Gambit (1985)
- Dream Time River (1984)
- Acid Bomb Explosion (1978)
- The Awakening of Doctor Kirthi and Other Stories (1976)
- Call of the Kirala (1978)
- A Quiet Place: A man's quest in a village by the jungle (1968)
