= Walkers Tours =

Travel company in Sri Lanka

- Company type: Private
- Industry: Travel
- Founded: 1969
- Headquarters: 117 Sir Chittampalam A Gardiner Mawatha, Colombo, Sri Lanka
- Area served: Worldwide
- Key people: Nalaka Amaratunga
- Products: Tour Packages, Bespoke Holidays, Excursions
- Brands: Nature Odyssey
- Owner: John Keells Holdings PLC
- Website: https://www.walkerstours.com/

Walkers Tours Limited is a travel company in Sri Lanka.

Walkers Tours is a destination management company based in Sri Lanka. that operates inbound tours. The company is a destination management operator. It also manages the brand Nature Odyssey, which caters to nature and adventure travel. Walkers Tours is part of the inbound leisure division of John Keells Holdings (JKH), the country's largest listed conglomerate on the Colombo Stock Exchange.

== History ==
Walkers Travels was founded in 1969; it was acquired by John Keells Holdings in 1972.

Walkers Tours was awarded a certification as the only tour operator of the country with internationally certified Carbon Neutral vehicle fleet.
