= Hayleys =

Sri Lankan conglomerate

Hayleys PLC

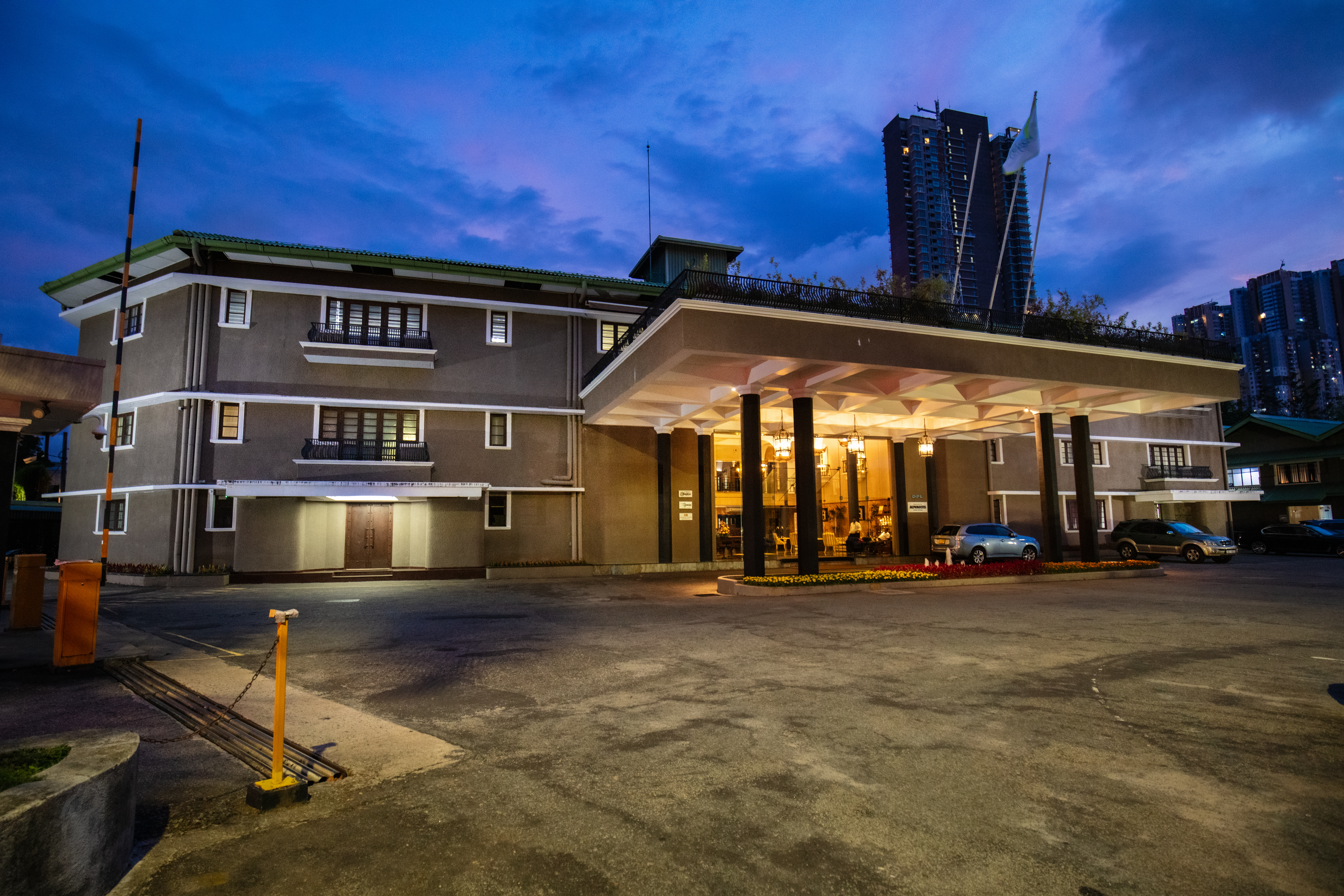
- Hayleys PLC head-office in Colombo, Sri Lanka
- Type: Public
- Traded as: CSE: HAYL.N0000
- ISIN: LK0080N00008
- Industry: Agriculture; BPO And Shared Services; Construction Materials; Consumer Products; Fibre; Hand Protection; Leisure And Aviation; Plantations And Tea Exports; Power & Energy; Purification Products; Textiles; Transportation And Logistics
- Predecessor: Chas P. Hayley and Company
- Founded: 10 January 1878; 148 years ago in Galle, Ceylon
- Founder: Charles Pickering Hayley
- Headquarters: Colombo, Sri Lanka
- Key people: Mohan Pandithage (Chairman and Chief Executive)
- Revenue: ▲LKR585.02 billion (2025)
- Operating income: ▲LKR 49.4 billion (2025)
- Net income: ▼LKR 22.2 billion (2025)
- Total assets: ▲LKR 645.8 billion (2025)
- Total equity: ▲LKR 170.5 billion (2025)
- Owners: Dhammika Perera (51.01%); Public Shareholders (37.09%); D. S. Jayasundera Trust (11.60%); Phantom Investments (Private) Limited (5.14%)
- Number of employees: ▲38,746 (2025)
- Subsidiaries: Haycarb PLC; Hayleys Fibre PLC; Dipped Products PLC; Hayleys Fabric PLC; Hayleys Leisure PLC; Alumex PLC; Singer (Sri Lanka) PLC; The Kingsbury PLC
- Website: www.hayleys.com

Hayleys PLC, founded in 1878 by Charles Pickering Hayley, is a multinational and diversified conglomerate company in Sri Lanka, publicly listed on the Colombo Stock Exchange with business spanning over 17 sectors, catering to 80 markets worldwide. Hayleys accounts for approximately 5% of Sri Lanka's export income, and 4.6% of the country's tea and 3.9% of its rubber production. With over 38,000 employees, Hayley was also the first listed entity in the country to surpass annual revenue of US$1 billion in Fiscal Year 2017/18. The company operates over 17 business sectors: eco-solutions, hand protection, purification, agriculture, consumer and retail, leisure, textile manufacturing, construction materials, plantations, industry inputs, power and energy, transportation and logistics, BPO, tea exports, energy, mobility and projects, investments and services and construction and engineering. Hayleys comprises over 182 business units and subsidiaries, twelve of which are publicly listed on the Colombo Stock Exchange. Hayleys PLC is a public listed company with over 16,403 shareholders as of March 31, 2026. In addition to Sri Lanka, Hayleys today has manufacturing facilities in Indonesia, Thailand, and India, with marketing operations in Australia, India, Bangladesh, Italy, Japan, Netherlands, UK, USA, France, Poland and Kenya, and its products are sold in 80 countries.

== History ==
=== Early Years 1871 Onwards ===
The beginnings of the Hayleys Group can be traced back to 1871 when Charles Pickering Hayley (1848–1934), the son of British businessman, Thomas Hayley (1807–1881), disembarked from the Percy Douglas, a 781-tonne clipper ship (owned by Thomas Hayley), at Galle, Ceylon. The ship subsequently was wrecked off the coast of Rangoon.

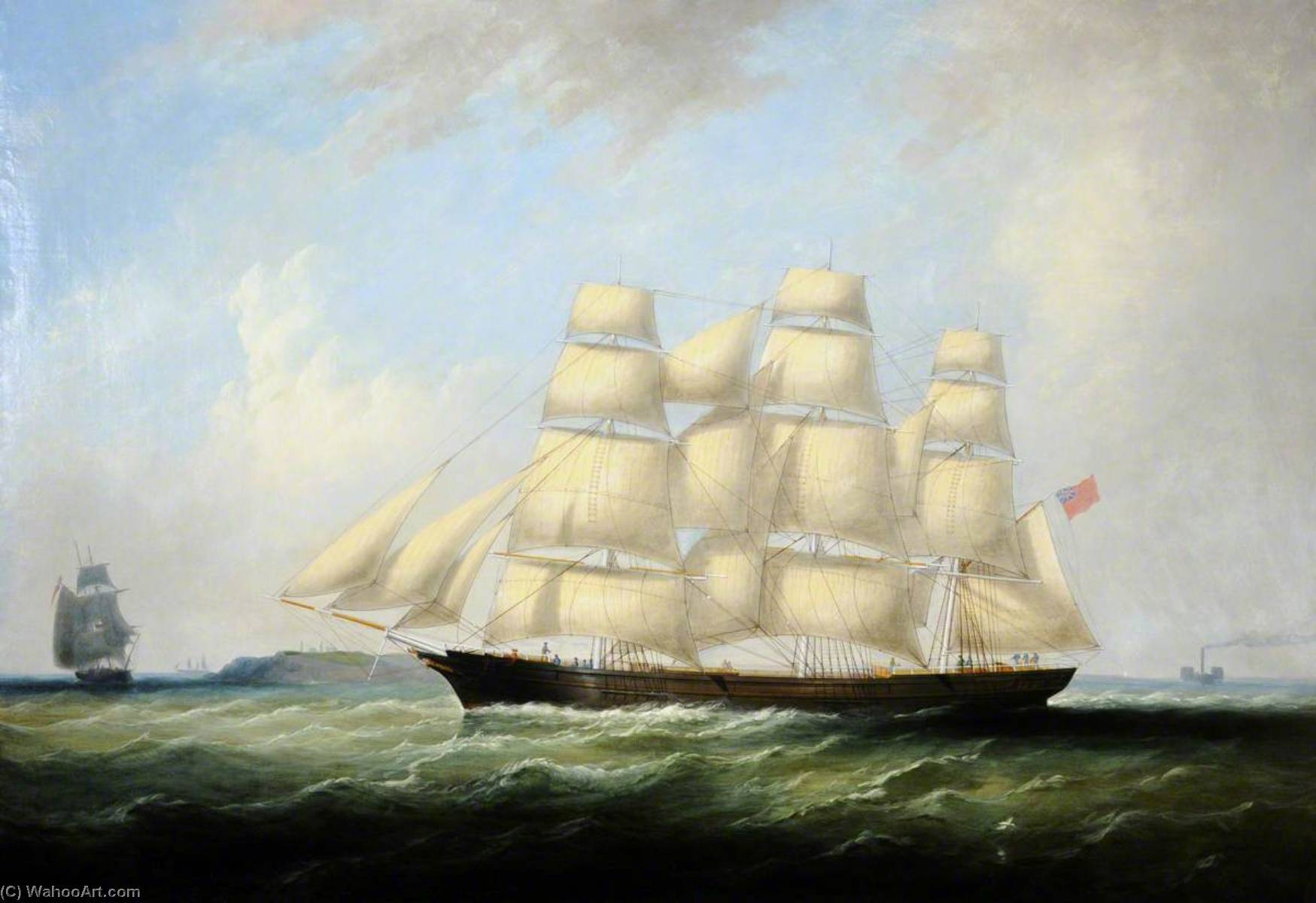
The Percy Douglas clipper ship

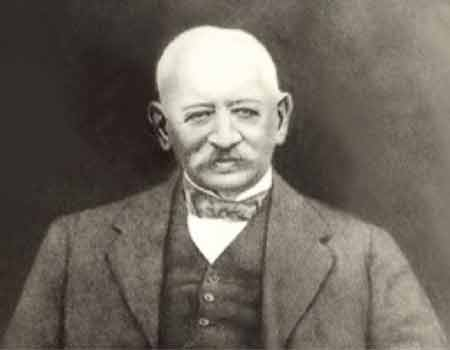
Founder Charles Pickering Hayley

Hayley joined a firm of shipping agents, Thomson Mitchell & Co, in 1874. When the company closed three years later due to bad investments, he rented a shop on Pedlar Street in Galle Fort and started his own import/export company, Chas. P. Hayley & Co., on 10 January 1878, exporting local products including coir, cinnamon and citronella oil and importing goods such as British claret. Hayley married Gertrude Fanny Lee (1849–1911), the daughter of George Lee, the Postmaster General of Ceylon (1844–1860) and Martha née Austin. The couple had six children and in 1893 his oldest son, Alec (1875–1936), joined the firm, followed by another son, Stuart Pickering (1883–1960), eight years later.

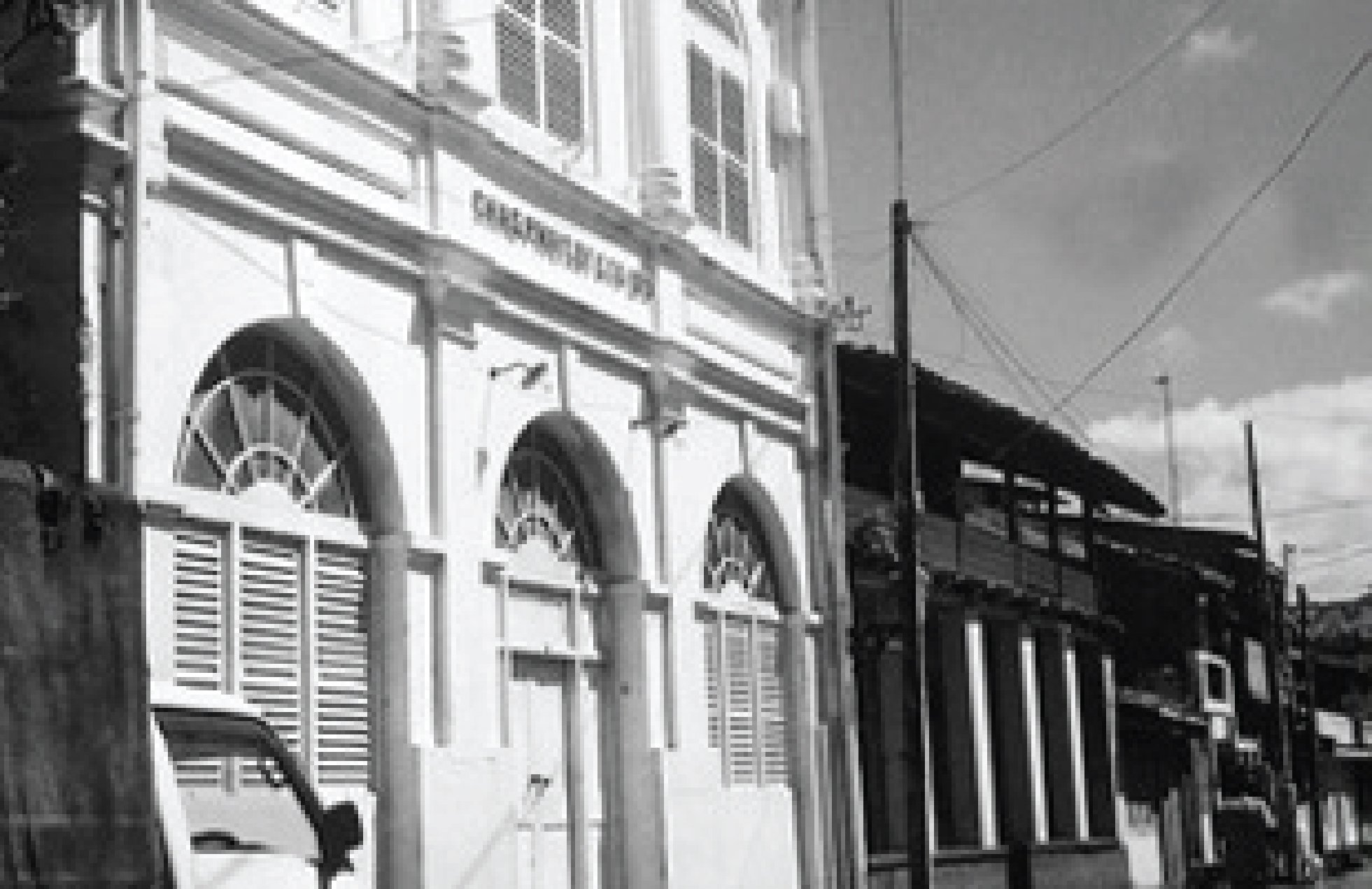
Chas. P. Hayley & Co - Pedlar Street shop

In 1909, he entered into a partnership with W. W. Kenny to purchase Thurburn Stores, at Deans Road.

Hayley and Kenny became a Private Limited Company in 1935 and Chas P. Hayley & Co. becomes a private limited liability company and fully owned subsidiary of Hayley and Kenny Ltd. in 1944. In 1954 under one corporate umbrella, the entity went public. Hayleys Ltd continued to diversify into a portfolio that currently includes activated carbon, rubber gloves, textiles, fibre-based products, tea and rubber plantations, leisure, transportation and logistics services, consumer products, and other investments and services to name just a few.

In 1958, its shipping agency department was restructured as Maritime Agencies Ltd, which later evolved into Hayleys Advantis. In the 1960s, Hayleys partnered with Bayer of Germany to establish Haychem Ltd for agrochemical production. A period of innovation followed with the establishment of Haycarb Ltd to produce activated carbon from coconut shell charcoal, a pioneering value-added export. The company further expanded by acquiring Ravi Industries Ltd, a coir brush manufacturer, and founding Dipped Products Ltd for rubber glove production. By 1983, Hayleys launched its first international venture in the United States, now known as Haycarb USA Inc. Throughout the subsequent decade, the company diversified further into hospitality, plantations, and textiles.

=== 2000 - Present ===
Hayleys steps into power generation in collaboration with AES corporation of USA in 2001.

Hayleys entered the ship-owning business in 2003 with a maiden investment in the container vessel "Orient Stride". 2003 also saw the first overseas plant setup by Dipped Products Ltd.

2006 saw Hayleys adopt a new visual identity, replacing its former logo of 50 years.

In 2008, Hayleys became one of the 10 signatories for the CEO Water Mandate initiative of the UN's Global Compact. In 2008, Dhammika Perera became the majority shareholder of Hayleys.

Hayleys continued to grow and expand through the decades with a series of strategic acquisitions, such as the acquisition of the Ceylon Continental Hotel in Colombo in 2010 (which at the time was the single largest investment in its history), and that of Alumex Group and Amaya Leisure PLC in 2011. The Ceylon Continental Hotel was rebranded and unveiled as The Kingsbury Hotel in 2012.

Hayleys also made forays into the renewable energy industry from 2013 onwards, through its wind power, hydropower and solar power plants located in advantageous locations in Sri Lanka.

The Advantis Free Zone was opened for operations in 2015.

In 2016, Hayleys acquired a 75% controlling stake in Fentons Group (subsequently rebranded as Hayleys Fentons) and purchased the Kuda Rah Resort in the Maldives (which became Amaya Kuda Rah).

In 2017, Hayleys acquired 61.73% of the equity in Singer (Sri Lanka) PLC (the single largest acquisition for a listed company in Sri Lanka in recent times), as well as the majority stake in Sri Lanka Shipping Company Limited, a leading shipping and maritime organization, making Advantis the largest vessel operator.

Hayleys celebrated "140 years of excellence" in 2018.

In 2018, Hayleys entered into a strategic partnership with Martin Bauer group of Germany, renaming Hayleys Global Beverages as Martin Bauer Hayleys with the joint venture investment by MB Beteligungs GmbH.

In April 2021, Hayleys Fabric acquired a 98.84% stake in South Asia Textiles Limited as part of its strategic plan to export value-added fabrics.

Hayleys Lifecode was launched in 2022 as a roadmap for the conglomerate Hayleys PLC to achieve its environmental, social, and governance (ESG) goals.

Hayleys and its associates have forged successful partnerships with Mercedes-Benz, TATA International, Dystar, Symrise, Bayer Cropscience, Philips Lighting, Polymer Latex, Volvo, Fujifilm, P&G, Shimadzu, FedEx and Gillette.

== Recent Acquisitions ==
Year	Company	Value
2010	Hayleys acquires its first city hotel – Ceylon Continental Hotel, now renamed as The Kingsbury	Rs 1.9 billion
2011	Hayleys enters in to the aluminium extrusion industry by acquiring the Alumex PLC	Rs. 2.2 billion
2012	Hayleys acquires majority stake in Amaya Hotels & Spas	Rs. 2.6 billion
2014	Acquire controlling Stakes of Alufab PLC (now Unisyst Engineering)	Rs. 170 million
2016	Acquisition of Fentons Limited	Rs. 722 million
2017	Hayleys acquires Kuda Rah Island Resort Maldives	US$23 million
2017	Acquisition of majority stake in Singer (Sri Lanka) PLC	Rs. 10.9 billion
2017	Acquisition of majority stake in Sri Lanka Shipping Company Ltd	Rs. 4.9 billion
2021	Hayleys Fabric acquires South Asia Textiles Ltd	Rs. 3.95 billion
2023	Acquisition of Horana Plantations PLC	Rs. 700 million

== Global Footprint ==
Hayleys is a Sri Lankan diversified conglomerate headquartered in Colombo, Sri Lanka. Its main offices are located in and around the premises; however other manufacturing, agricultural, marketing, and production bases are geographically spread around the country and throughout five different continents.

Country	Company Name
Thailand	Dipped Products (Thailand) Limited; Carbokarn Company Limited; CK Regen Systems Company Limited; Shizuka Company Limited; Advantis Leo (Thailand) Limited
Bangladesh	Haychem (Bangladesh) Ltd; Hayleys Aventura BD Limited; Advantis Intasl Bangladesh (Pvt) Ltd
Indonesia	PT Mapalus Makawanua Charcoal Industry; PT Haycarb Palu Mitra; PT Advantis Akaza Indonesia
Maldives	Luxury Resorts Pvt Ltd; Hayleys Hotels Maldives Private Limited; Total Transport Solutions (Pvt) Ltd; Nautical Maldives Private Limited; Super Logistics Private Limited; One world Logistics Maldives Private Limited
Myanmar	Advantis Kushara Sedate Myanmar(Pvt) Ltd; Advantis Sedate Myanmar (PVT) Ltd
France	DPL France SAS
India	Charles Fibres (Pvt) Ltd; Dipped Products India (Private) Limited; Haycarb Activated Carbon ( Pvt) Ltd; Logiwiz Logistics India (Pvt) Ltd
Australia	Haycarb Holdings Australia (Pvt) Limited
Italy	Icoguanti S.P.A
Singapore	Puricarb Pte Ltd; Haycarb Singapore Pte Ltd; Hayleys Aventura Singapore Pte. Ltd.; Advantis Singapore Pte Ltd; Advatis Sabang Raya Lines Pte. Ltd; Nex-Gen Engineering Pte. Ltd
United Kingdom	Eurocarb Products Ltd; Haylex Ltd (UK)
Poland	ROZENBAL POLSKA Sp. z. o.o; Livee Polska SP. ZO.O
United States	Haycarb USA, INC
Kenya	Hayleys Fentons East Africa Limited; Mabroc East Africa Limited
Japan	Haylex Japan
Netherland	Haylex B V
British Virgin Islands	Haycarb Holdings Bitung Limited
Philippines	Haycarb Philippines Corporation

Source: Annual Report, 2023/24 (p. 466-470)

== Corporate Recognition ==
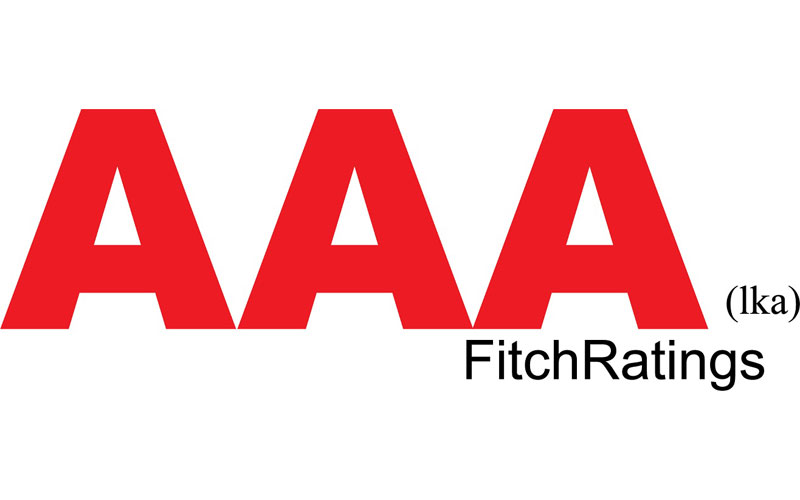
Fitch Affirms Hayleys at 'AAA(lka)'

Hayleys PLC has a National Long-Term Rating of ‘AAA(lka)/Stable’ awarded by Fitch Ratings. However, the composition of the entire Group includes 12 other publicly listed companies. The blue-chip recorded its highest profits in the twelve months ending 31 March 2022. The single largest investment in the 140-plus year history of Hayleys (and the largest acquisition of a public listed company at the time) was the 10.8 billion rupee controlling stake of Singer Sri Lanka in 2017, followed by the buying over of the five-star Ceylon Continental Hotel in Colombo, Sri Lanka (now known as The Kingsbury) in 2010.

In 2010, Hayleys Group was named Sri Lanka's Best Corporate Citizen by the Ceylon Chamber of Commerce.

The firm brought fame and recognition to the country by winning a European Foundation for Management Development Award for the INSEAD-produced case study featuring the company, and winning the USAID Global Development Alliance Award for Sri Lanka for fostering commercial agriculture in Sri Lanka's Eastern Province.

In 2012, the Hayleys Group was ranked amongst the top three most respected business entities in Sri Lanka and placed first for Nation-Mindedness in Lanka Monthly Digest's ‘Most Respected Entities In Sri Lanka’ survey, the Group's best standing since 2008.

In 2021, Hayleys PLC was ranked the No.1 company in the LMD's Top 100 listed companies of Sri Lanka (for the fifth consecutive time) and the Business Today Top 40.

== Finances ==
Ten Year Financial Summary
Year	Revenue LKR (mns)	Profit LKR (mns)	Equity LKR (mns)	Capital employed LKR (mns)	Earnings per share LKR
2026	585,021	22,223	113,215	460,157	18.71
2025	492,201	22,513	93,142	348,503	17.93
2024	436,732	14,847	80,163	297,412	9.19
2023	487,431	27,672	78,930	282,402	21.80
2022	338,010	28,099	67,390	277,221	24.34
2021	241,276	14,046	47,618	189,661	10.18
2020	210,307	2,895	39,705	186,412	0.50
2019	219,182	2,750	40,242	175,162	0.35
2018	163,249	3,272	39,649	152,449	1.37
2017	111,383	5,048	40,866	102,787	3.71
2016	92,275	5,195	31,096	80,036	4.16
2015	92,562	4,886	29,261	73,544	3.44
2014	80,479	3,709	23,723	62,163	2.41

Source: Annual Report, 2024/25 (p. 488)
