= John Keells IT =

Software Company

- Company type: Limited
- Industry: Information Technology
- Headquarters: Colombo, Sri Lanka
- Area served: Sri Lanka; Dubai; United Kingdom
- Number of employees: Approx. 250
- Parent: John Keells Holdings
- Website: johnkeellsit.com

John Keells IT, also known as JKIT formerly John Keells Computer Services is a software company that is developing software primarily for the aviation and leisure industries. It is headquartered in Colombo, Sri Lanka. It also operates Offshore Development Centers (ODCs) in Dubai and Scandinavia.

JKCS is a subsidiary of John Keells Holdings (JKH), which is one of the largest business conglomerates in Sri Lanka. JKCS is one of the three IT related companies operated under John Keells Holdings. These are John Keells Computer Services (JKCS), John Keells Office Automation (JKOA) Limited and John Keells Business Process Outsourcing Ltd (JKBPO).

Some of its major clients include the Emirates airline, SriLankan Airlines, Air Arabia, Qatar Airways, Computer Sciences Corporation (CSC), and Keells Hotel Management Systems Ltd (KHMS). The Skywards passenger rewards system for Emirates was also developed by JKCS; SriLankan Airlines used the same system when it was under Emirates ownership.

== Products ==
Logo of John Keells Computer Services, former name of the company

JKIT currently provides IT products and services to businesses in all enterprise verticals, and they are considered as one of the key partners of SAP and Microsoft in Sri Lanka having worked with both of them for a long period of time.
