= Hayleys Fabric =

Sri Lankan knitted fabric manufacturer

Hayleys Fabric PLC
- Logo of Hayleys Fabric
- Formerly: Hayleys MGT Knitting Mills (1993-2015)
- Company type: Public
- Traded as: CSE: MGT.N0000
- ISIN: LK0335N00006
- Industry: Apparel
- Founded: 1993; 33 years ago
- Headquarters: Colombo, Sri Lanka
- Key people: A. M. Pandithage (Chairman); E. R. P. Goonetilleke (Managing Director/CEO)
- Revenue: ▲US$167 million (2023)
- Operating income: ▼US$8 million (2023)
- Net income: ▼US$1.133 million (2023)
- Total assets: ▼US$119 million (2023)
- Total equity: ▼US$28 million (2023)
- Number of employees: ▲3,088 (2023)
- Parent: Hayleys (58.96%)
- Subsidiaries: South Asia Textiles Limited
- Website: www.hayleysfabric.com

Hayleys Fabric PLC, formerly known as Hayleys MGT Knitting Mills, is a knitted fabric manufacturing company in Sri Lanka. Hayleys MGT Knitting Mills was founded in 1993 as a joint venture between Hayleys and MGT Knitting Mills of Australia. The company was listed on the Colombo Stock Exchange in 2003. A fraud incident which was dubbed the biggest in a listed company in Sri Lanka rocked the company in 2011. The company adopted its current name, Hayleys Fabric in 2015. Hayleys Fabric acquired South Asia Textiles Ltd for LKR3.9 billion from Ambeon Holdings in 2021. As a result of the acquisition, Hayleys Fabric became the largest fabric manufacturer in Sri Lanka by exceeding the processing capacity of its closest competitor, Teejay Lanka. Hayleys Fabric is one of the LMD 100 companies in Sri Lanka.

== History ==
Hayleys MGT Knitting Mills was founded as a joint venture between Hayleys and MGT Knitting Mills of Australia in 1993. Hayleys ADC Textiles, another joint venture between Hayleys and Australia Dyeing Company formed in 1992. Hayleys ADC Textiles was made a wholly owned subsidiary of Hayleys MGT Knitting Mills in 2001, and in 2007, the two companies merged. The company was listed on the Colombo Stock Exchange in 2003.

The company was rocked by a fraud incident in 2011, dubbed the biggest fraud in a listed company. As a result, the company made a loss for the 2010/11 financial year for the first time in its history. LKR717 million was set aside for provision during the year. Former joint managing director Bandula Weerasinghe and former general manager of stores Roshan Gunaratne were arrested over the incident by the Criminal Investigation Department (CID). The CID cited Weerasinghe as the main suspect in fraud amounting to LKR350 million.

S. Spezza, who has been the joint managing director since the inception of the company, resigned in December 2012. Spezza founded MGT Samoor which is based in Melbourne, Australia. In 2014, Hayleys MGT launched 'INNO', its own brand of knitted fabric. The company changed its name to Hayleys Fabric in July 2015.

== Operations ==
Hayleys Fabric acquired South Asia Textiles Ltd in April 2021 for LKR3.9 billion from Ambeon Holdings. South Asia Textiles' plant is located in Pugoda and has a processing capacity of 800 tonnes of textiles per month. The acquisition of South Asia Textiles Ltd made Hayleys Fabric the largest fabric manufacturer in the country. Hayleys Fabric's processing capacity increased to 57 tonnes per day, surpassing its closest competitors, Teejay Lanka's and its subsidiary Ocean Lanka's processing capacity of 40 tonnes per day. Hayleys Fabric invested LKR6.3 million to preserve Diyathuru Park, a wetland located adjacent to its plant in Narthupana in Kalutara District. The ecological survey carried out in collaboration with the Ministry of Environment revealed the wetland is inhabited by 149 species of fauna and 146 species of flora.

Hayleys Fabric is one of the LMD 100 companies in Sri Lanka. The company was ranked 48th in the 2021/22 edition which was published in 2023. LMD 100 is an annual list of Sri Lankan listed companies by revenue. Leonie Vaas, the Manager of Sustainability and Innovation of the company was selected as one of the ten Sustainable Development Goals Pioneers by the United Nations Global Compact for 2021.

== Finances ==
Financial Summary
Year	Revenue US$ (thousands)	Profit after tax US$ (thousands)	Shareholder funds US$ (thousands)	Capital employed US$ (thousands)	Earnings per share US$
2023	166,631	1,133	28,299	71,257	0.003
2022	150,219	12,777	30,457	73,603	0.031
2021	77,281	3,852	20,926	37,494	0.009
2020	67,116	1,271	18,406	35,178	0.003
2019	69,941	1,058	17,859	33,044	0.005
2018	57,687	(680)	17,037	33,744	(0.003)
2017	55,537	490	17,585	37,272	0.002
2016	59,924	1,845	17,127	33,946	0.009
2015	65,032	680	15,510	34,461	0.004
2014	61,252	(1,388)	10,688	27,555	(0.008)

Source: Annual Report, 2022/23 (p. 234)

== See also ==
- List of companies listed on the Colombo Stock Exchange
