= Plantersbank =

- Industry: Finance and Insurance
- Predecessors: Bulacan Development Bank; Bulacan Savings and Loan Association
- Founded: 1961; 65 years ago in San Miguel, Bulacan (as the BDB)
- Defunct: 2016; 10 years ago
- Fate: merged with Chinabank Savings
- Successor: Chinabank
- Headquarters: Makati, Philippines
- Key people: Jesus Tambunting, Chairman
- Products: Financial services
- Parent: China Banking Corporation
- Website: www.plantersbank.com.ph (archived)

Planters Development Bank, more commonly known as Plantersbank, was a major private development bank in the Philippines which mainly catered to small and medium enterprises (SMEs). At its peak, it was the largest private development bank in the country. It was a China Banking Corporation subsidiary from 2014 until it was merged to its parent company's savings bank in 2016.

== History ==
Businessman Jesus Tambunting is credited to have founded Planters Development Bank. The bank traces its roots to two banking institutions in Bulacan; the Bulacan Development Bank (BDB) which was founded in 1961 in San Miguel and the Bulacan Savings and Loan Association (BSLA) of Malolos. At least one these banks in Bulacan catered to entrepreneurs from the countryside who runs small and medium enterprises (SMEs).

The Tambunting Group acquired the BSLA in July 1971 took over the BDB in December 1972. The two banks merged in December 1975 with the BDB the surviving entity. The BDB was renamed the Planters Development Bank in 1976 and moved its headquarters to Baliuag. It moved its headquarters to Makati in 1981. It gradually grew by opening new branches and acquiring other local banks.

In 2014, the bank became a subsidiary of China Banking Corporation of Henry Sy. Plantersbank's 78 branches at that time also became part of Chinabank.

Plantersbank grew to be the largest private development bank and leading bank for SMEs in the Philippines with total assets of ₱54 billion, total loan portfolio of ₱33 billion, and deposits of ₱44 billion as of June 30, 2013.

In 2016, the bank was merged with China Bank Savings. The reorganization and retrenchment of employees caused a labor protest which was mediated by the Department of Labor and Employment.
