= Richard Pieris & Company =

One of Sri Lanka's largest conglomerates

Richard Pieris and Company
- Type: Public
- Traded as: CSE: RICH.N0000
- ISIN: LK0143N00004
- Industry: Manufacturing; Engineering; Rubber; Plantations; Retail and Tyre; Pumps; Construction
- Founded: 1932; 94 years ago
- Headquarters: Colombo, Sri Lanka
- Key people: Dr. Sena Yaddehige (Chairman/CEO/MD)
- Revenue: ▲LKR56,725 million (2021)
- Operating income: ▲LKR6,500 million (2021)
- Net income: ▲LKR5,066 million (2021)
- Total assets: ▲LKR72,257 million (2021)
- Total equity: ▲LKR20,706 million (2021)
- Owner: Skyworld Overseas Holdings Limited (25.37%); Camille Consulting Corp. (16.11%); Deutsche Bank AG Singapore A/C 2 (11.04%)
- Number of employees: 27,300 (2019)
- Subsidiaries: Kegalle Plantations PLC; Namunukula Plantations PLC; Maskeliya Plantations PLC
- Website: arpico.com

Richard Pieris and Company (ARPICO) established in 1940 it is one of Sri Lanka's largest conglomerates with interests in manufacturing, engineering, retail and plantation industries. It is a pioneer in the tyre, plantation and rubber industries of Sri Lanka. With a staff strength of more than 25,000, the company's major brands include Arpitec, Arpidag and Arpico.

== History ==
The company was founded in 1932 as a partnership initially dealing with the plantation and tire industries. Initially it started as a family business. The founder member of the company Mr Richard Pieris. Since then it has diversified into the areas of manufacturing, pumps, retail and engineering sectors. The company also pioneered the concept of hypermarkets in Sri Lanka through their 'Arpico Super Centre' chain. Today the company has more than 1000 retail outlets including dealerships and factories islandwide.

=== Ownership Change ===
The Pieris family's stake in Richard Pieris as well as other large blocks of the company's shares were acquired by Dr Sena Yaddehige and related parties in a hard-fought take over in 2002–2004.

== Industry sectors ==
=== Rubber ===
The company is engaged in the manufacture of moulded, extruded and foam rubber both for the export and domestic markets. Major markets include North America, Europe and the Middle East. The division conforms to ISO 9002 standards.

=== Tires ===
Richard Piries Company is the pioneer in the tyre Retread industry of Sri Lanka and commands a market share of nearly 60%. It has become the largest Retreader in the whole of South Asia. The company is associated with Bandag Corporation – USA and Birla Group India.

=== Plantations ===
The group is one of the largest players in the plantation industry with ownership of major plantation companies including Maskeliya Plantations PLC, Namunukula Plantations PLC and Kegalle Plantations PLC. The sector employs more than 24,000 people combined.

=== Retail ===
With its retail arm ‘Arpico Supercentre’ the company is the largest retailer of general household products in Sri Lanka. The company pioneered the concept of Hypermarkets in Sri Lanka. The company also operates medium-scale supermarkets under the brand name 'Arpico Daily'.
