= Amaya Resorts & Spas =

Sri Lankan hotel chain

- Type: Public
- Traded as: CSE: CONN.N0000
- ISIN: LK0281N00002
- Industry: Holding company; Hospitality
- Predecessor: Connaissance de Ceylan Hotels
- Founded: 1981; 45 years ago
- Founder: Chandra Wickramasinghe of Connaissance de Ceylan Hotels
- Headquarters: Colombo, Sri Lanka
- Key people: A. M. Pandithage (Chairman); Rohan J. Karunarajah (Managing Director)
- Revenue: ▲LKR1,531 million (2023)
- Operating income: ▲LKR(892) million (2023)
- Net income: ▲LKR(824) million (2023)
- Total assets: ▼LKR5,409 million (2023)
- Total equity: ▼LKR1,234 million (2023)
- Owner: Hayleys (43.24%); Dean Foster (Pvt) Ltd (21.34%); Employees' Provident Fund (9.62%)
- Number of employees: ▲699 (2023)
- Parent: Hayleys
- Website: www.amayaresorts.com

Amaya Resorts & Spas, trading as Hayleys Leisure PLC (formerly Amaya Leisure PLC), is a Sri Lankan hospitality company. The company is listed on the Colombo Stock Exchange on 11 March 1996 and Sri Lankan conglomerate, Hayleys owns a controlling stake of 61.66% of the company's stocks (40.32% directly and 21.34% via its subsidiary, Dean Foster (Pvt) Ltd). In 2020, Amaya Resorts & Spas ranked 87th amongst the top 100 most valuable brands in Sri Lanka by Brand Finance.

== History ==
Amaya Leisure commenced operations in 1981 as Connaissance, a tour operator and then in 1994, built a chalet-type hotel adjacent to the Kandalama lake. The hotel has 106 rooms and has been upgraded to four-star class and rebranded as Amaya Lake in 2005. Hayleys acquired Amaya Leisure PLC on September 1, 2011. Back then, the company consisted of only three resorts, Amaya Lake, Amaya Hills, and Amaya Langdale. In 2012, Amaya acquired the Lake Lodge in Kandalama and was planning to add 400 rooms as expansion. As part of Tripadvisor's travellers choice, Amaya Langdale, a luxury boutique hotel, was ranked amongst the Top 25 Luxury Hotels in Sri Lanka in 2014.

In 2016, Amaya Leisure sold 84.3 per cent of shares of The Beach Resorts Limited to Dhammika Perera, the co-chairman and controlling shareholder of Hayleys, for LKR330.1 million in a related party transaction. The Beach Resorts Limited is a freehold property located in Wadduwa. In the same year, Amaya Leisure ventured into the Maldives by acquiring a 51-villa luxury resort for US$23 million. In 2017, Amuna Ayurveda Retreat won the Best Wellness Retreat at the World Spa Awards. In September 2017, Amaya Hills celebrated its 20th anniversary and Yes FM sponsored the main event held at Le Garage, the hotel's nightclub. In 2021, the long-term director/shareholder, Lalin Samarawickrama, who was the fourth-largest shareholder, quit the company and sold his stake of 9% to Sri Lanka Insurance Corporation.

== Properties ==
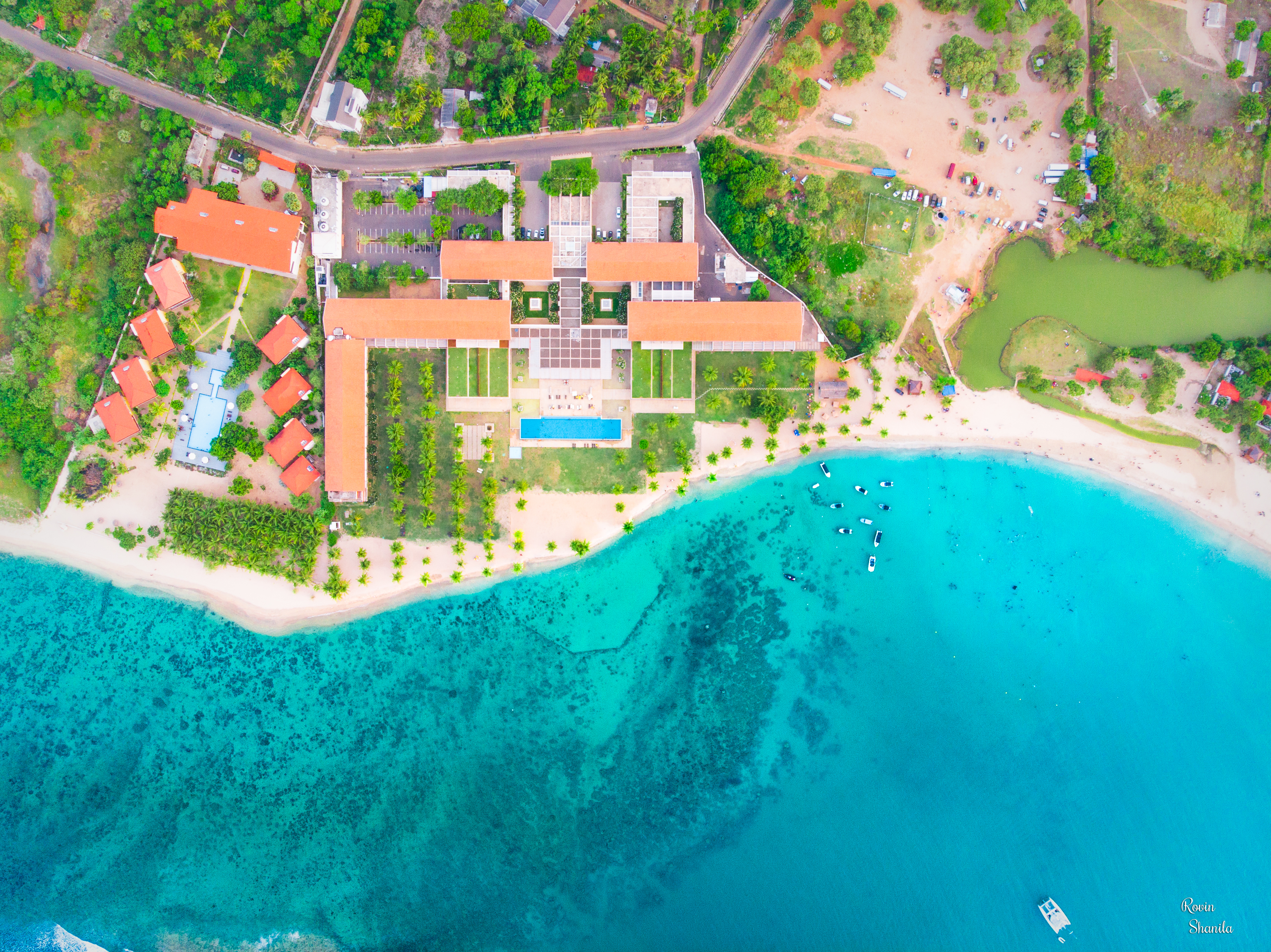
An aerial view of Amaya Beach, Pasikudah

Currently, the company has a capacity of 439 rooms across its nine properties, while owning six of them and managing the other three properties on behalf of third-party owners. Amuna Ayurveda Retreat is located in Kimbissa, Sigiriya. The retreat is built in a manner to represent a traditional village and built using recycled materials. The medicinal oil and food are grown in the village itself and the meals served to the guests are purely vegetarian.

=== Amaya hotels and resorts ===
- Amaya Beach, Pasikudah
- Amaya Hills (formerly Le Kandyan), Kandy
- Amaya Lake (formerly Culture Club), Dambulla

=== Boutique collection by Amaya ===
- Langdale Boutique Hotel, Nuwara Eliya
- Oliphant Boutique Villa, Nuwara Eliya
- Amuna Ayurveda Retreat, Sigiriya

== See also ==
- The Kingsbury, another hotel owned by Hayleys Group
- Cinnamon Hotels & Resorts, a rival hotel chain in Sri Lanka
- List of companies listed on the Colombo Stock Exchange
