= John Keells Holdings =

Sri Lankan conglomerate company

John Keells Holdings PLC
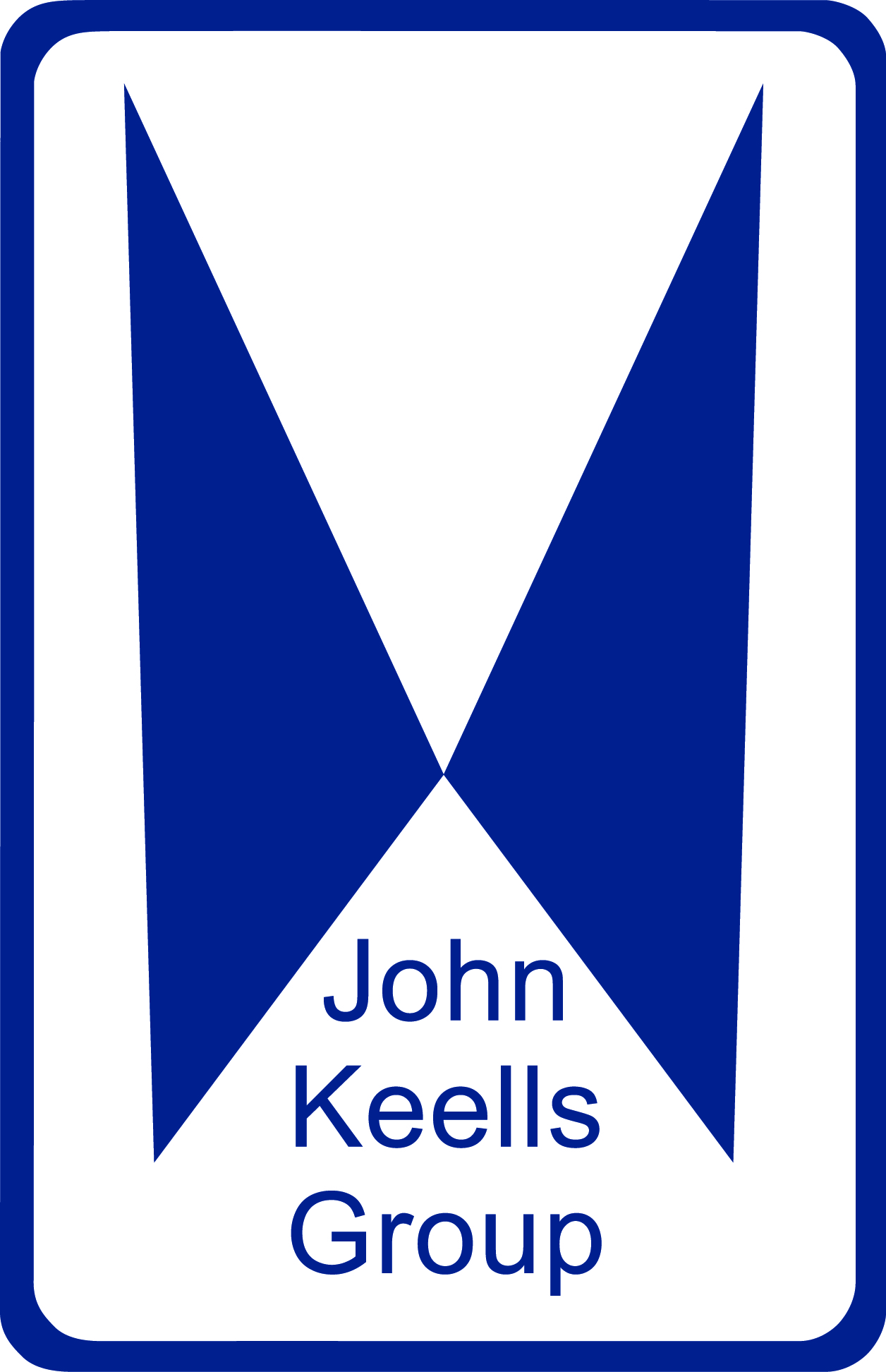
- Formerly: John Keells Limited
- Company type: Public
- Traded as: CSE: JKH.N0000; S&P Sri Lanka 20 Index component
- ISIN: LK0092N00003
- Industry: Conglomerate
- Founded: 1870; 156 years ago
- Headquarters: Colombo, Sri Lanka
- Key people: Krishan Balendra (CEO)
- Brands: Keells; Elephant House; Union Assurance; Nations Trust Bank; Cinnamon Hotels & Resorts; Walkers Tours; JKIT; Evinta; Crescat Boulevard; KZone; John Keells Properties; onThree20; Cinnamon Air
- Revenue: ▲LKR260.687 billion (2023)
- Operating income: ▲LKR12.691 billion (2023)
- Net income: ▼LKR18.896 billion (2023)
- Total assets: ▲LKR744.506 billion (2023)
- Total equity: ▲LKR360.418 billion (2023)
- Owners: S. E. Captain (9.68%); Melstacorp (9.31%) Public shareholders (88.38%)
- Number of employees: ▲22,250 (2022/23)
- Subsidiaries: Asian Hotels and Properties PLC; Ceylon Cold Stores PLC; John Keells Hotels PLC; John Keells PLC; Keells Food Products PLC; Tea Smallholder Factories PLC; Trans Asia Hotels PLC; Union Assurance PLC
- Website: www.keells.com

John Keells Holdings PLC (JKH) is a Sri Lankan multinational conglomerate company. It has business interests in hotels and resorts management, port, marine fuel and logistics services, IT services, manufacturing of food and beverages, supermarkets, tea, stock broking, life insurance, banking, and real estate.

JKH is a full member of the World Economic Forum and has issued Global Depository Receipts on the Luxembourg Stock Exchange, and was the first Sri Lankan company to be listed overseas. Keells is reportedly the most valuable company in Sri Lanka since the 1980s.

== History ==
Edwin and George John founded John Keells in the 1870s. They incorporated the company in Colombo, Ceylon with the name E.John & Co. It was initially set up as a manufacturer of tea and essential foods. In 1948 E. John & Co. merged with two UK based companies including Thompson and White & Co. Ltd.

In 1960, it merged with yet another broking company, Keells & Waldock. The merged entity was known as John Keells Thompson White Ltd.

During the 1970s, John Keells diversified by acquiring Walkers Ltd, a tour operator and Mackinnon’s Group which had interests in shipping.

During the 1970s and 1980s, the company mainly focussed on new opportunities in the tourist industry.

In 1986, the name was changed again, from John Keells Ltd to John Keells Holdings Ltd. In 1986/87 John Keells went public.

John Keells Limited remains today as the business within John Keells Holdings, and is the prominent company in the Sri Lankan tea sector, operates a tea auction system where tea is sold to various buyers.

== Shareholding ==
The number of shares of John Keells is approximately 1.32 Billion. In 2021, the share price of JKH reached Rs. 147. The promoter group, the SK Captain family, hold 11.62% of the total shares whereas the remaining 88.38% shares are held by public shareholders, including Citigroup.

=== Listing ===
The company's equity shares have been listed on the Colombo Stock Exchange since the 1980s. As of 2021, JKH's market capitalization stood at Rs195 billion, making it the largest company in Sri Lanka. In 1994 the Global Depository Receipts issued by the company were listed on the Luxembourg Stock Exchange.

Company has received domestic credit rating of AAA (lka) from Fitch. It was to become the 10th most valuable brand in Sri Lanka worth Rs. US$103 million in 2020 (excluding Elephant House).

== Businesses and investments ==
=== Transportation ===
John Keells' total revenue from logistics was 10%, from transporting 12% and 5% from supply chain management.

John Keells Logistics (Pvt) Ltd. is a logistic, supply chain management and transportation management company. It is a subsidiary of John Keells. It is a recipient of the ISO 9001:2015 and ISO 45001:2018 certifications.

Mackinnons is one of the oldest logistic companies in Sri Lanka. It was founded by India Steamship Company in 1917. Mackinnons Group was acquired by John Keells in the 1970s.

=== Startup accelerator ===
John Keells Holdings launched John Keells X in 2016 to boost creative and intellectual business talent in Sri Lanka via a competitive programme conceptualized and administered by John Keells Holdings PLC. It includes investment in Blue lotus 360, DirectPay, HeliosP2P, SenzAgro.

== Finances ==
John Keells Holdings financial performance
Year	Revenue in bil. LKR	EBIT in bil. LKR	Profit in bil. LKR	Equity in bil. LKR	Capital employed in bil. LKR	Earnings per share LKR
2023	276.640	40.392	18.896	360.418	624.478	13.12
2022	218.075	34.359	20.443	330.091	598.319	15.13
2021	127.676	7.931	3.951	242.987	415.891	3.62
2020	138.956	15.508	9.741	243.723	344.630	7.14
2019	135.456	20.198	16.237	230.358	284.871	11.13
2018	121.215	28.155	23.120	224.864	254.587	15.2
2017	106.273	23.324	18.117	194.331	217.097	11.9
2016	93.710	20.192	15.792	168.481	189.231	10.5
2015	91.852	19.226	15.745	150.077	174.011	12.6
2014	86.706	16.537	12.958	134.319	160.458	10.5

Source: Annual Report, 2022/23 (p. 305)
