= Haycarb =

Activated carbon manufacturing company in Sri Lanka

Haycarb PLC
- The green Haycarb logo was introduced in 2010 to symbolise the company's emphasis on a green supply chain, among other things.
- Company type: Public
- Traded as: CSE: HAYC.N0000
- ISIN: LK0079N00000
- Industry: Materials
- Founded: 1973; 53 years ago
- Headquarters: Colombo, Sri Lanka
- Key people: Mohan Pandithage (Chairman); Rajitha Kariyawasan (Managing Director)
- Revenue: ▲LKR60.943 billion (2023)
- Operating income: ▲LKR8.274 billion (2023)
- Net income: ▲LKR6.505 billion (2023)
- Total assets: ▲LKR40.191 billion (2023)
- Total equity: ▲LKR25.212 billion (2023)
- Owners: Hayleys (67.73%); Employees' Provident Fund (4.45%)
- Number of employees: ▲1,880 (2022/23)
- Parent: Hayleys
- Subsidiaries: See text
- Website: www.haycarb.com

Haycarb PLC is a coconut shell-based activated carbon manufacturing company in Sri Lanka. Haycarb was incorporated in 1973. The company controls 16% of the world's market share. Haycarb operates manufacturing plants in Sri Lanka, Thailand and Indonesia, while marketing offices are located in the United States, the United Kingdom and Australia.

== History ==
Haycarb was incorporated in 1973 and was listed on the Colombo Stock Exchange in 1975. The company started exporting to Nevada, the United States in 1977 and SorbTech, a joint venture was incorporated in the United States. It was the first overseas investment of the company and became one of the earliest Sri Lankan companies to expand outside the country. Haycarb acquired Carbokarn in Thailand in 1993, and it was the first overseas manufacturing plant of the company. The company expanded to the United Kingdom and Australia in 1989 and Indonesia in 2005 with the opening of the PT Mapalus Makawanua Charcoal Industry plant. In 1995, Sorbtech has renamed Haymark and the company fully acquired Haymark's stake. Haycarb launched a new green logo in 2010 in response to prevailing market dynamics. Haycarb symbolised its emphasis on a green supply chain through its new logo. Haycarb obtained ISO 14001 certification in 2011 and ISO 22000 certification in 2018. Haymark was rebranded as Haycarb USA in 2014.

Haycarb's joint venture in Thailand, Carbokarn Company acquired Shizuka Company Limited's 100% stake in 2012. A slowdown in gold mining demand, which uses activated carbon, resulted in the under-utilisation of Haycarb's manufacturing facilities in 2015 for three months. The corporate social responsibility project, "Sathdiyawara" of Puritas, a subsidiary of Haycarb, won the world award in the water category at the 2017 Energy Globe Awards. The project provides clean drinking water in North and North Central provinces, which are affected by chronic kidney disease. Over 2,000 projects from 178 countries were considered for the awards.

== Operations ==
Haycarb has manufacturing plants in Sri Lanka, Thailand and Indonesia while marketing offices are located in the United States, the United Kingdom and Australia. Despite the impacts of the COVID-19 pandemic, the company posted a record revenue of LKR25.4 billion for the financial year of 2020/21. Haycarb's value-added products such as supercapacitors are a high-growth segment. The company entered into a partnership with Tesla. The surge in electric vehicles' production will grow for demand for value-added products. Haycarb invested heavily in R&D for the past three years to develop value-added products. Haycarb has introduced an environment-friendly charcoal producing technique called "Haritha Angara".

Haycarb appointed Shamalie Gunawardena to its board of directors in March 2021 as an independent non-executive director. At the time of appointment, Gunawardena was holding several positions including senior legal advisor to Colombo Port City, and a board member of DFCC Bank. CFA Society Sri Lanka set Haycarb as the subject of its annual research challenge in 2021. Over 5,000 students from 91 countries participated in the challenge in the previous year. Haycarb ranked 44th in LMD 100, a list of quoted companies in Sri Lanka by revenue in its 2020/21 edition.

== Subsidiaries ==
Haycarb controls 15 subsidiaries of which 11 are incorporated in foreign countries.

| Company | Incorporated year | Country | Stake |
|---|---|---|---|
| PT Mapalus Makawanua Charcoal Industry | 1985 | Indonesia | 100% |
| Eurocarb Products | 1986 | United Kingdom | 100% |
| Haycarb Holdings Australia | 1989 | Australia | 100% |
| Carbokarn | 1993 | Thailand | 50% |
| Haycarb USA | 1993 | United States | 100% |
| Puritas | 1995 | Sri Lanka | 100% |
| Recogen | 1997 | Sri Lanka | 100% |
| CK Regen Systems | 2002 | Thailand | 50% |
| Haycarb Holdings Bitung | 2005 | British Virgin Islands | 100% |
| Ultracarb | 2010 | Sri Lanka | 100% |
| Shizuka Co. Ltd. | 2012 | Thailand | 50% |
| Haycarb Value Added Products | 2012 | Sri Lanka | 100% |
| PT Haycarb Palu Mitra | 2012 | Indonesia | 60% |
| Puricarb | 2014 | Singapore | 100% |
| Haycarb Activated Carbon | 2017 | India | 100% |

== See also ==
- List of companies listed on the Colombo Stock Exchange
