= Spar =

Spar commonly refers to:

- Spar (sailing), part of a sailing vessel
- Spar (aeronautics), part of an aircraft
- Sparring, mock combat

It may also refer to:

== In business ==
- Spar (retailer), a multinational retailer
- Spar Aerospace, a former Canadian aerospace company
- Spar grocery stores, owned by Pisiffik, Greenland
- NASDAQ symbol for Spartan Motors, US

== Vessels ==
- USCGC Spar (WLB-403), a former United States Coast Guard seagoing buoy tender
- USCGC Spar (WLB-206), a United States Coast Guard seagoing buoy tender

== SPAR or SPARS ==
- SPARS, the United States Coast Guard Women's Reserve
- Society of Professional Audio Recording Services
- Special Program of Assisted Reproduction

== Other uses ==
- Spar (mineralogy), a crystal with readily discernible faces
- Spar (platform), a type of floating oil platform
- Spar (tree), part of a cable logging setup
- Spar Island (Rhode Island), a sandbar
- "Spar" (short story), by Kij Johnson
- Debora Spar

== See also ==
- SPARS code, a code on some compact disc recordings
