= Manulife China Bank Life Assurance Corporation =

Financial service in the Philippines

Manulife China Bank Life Assurance Corporation (MCBLife) is a joint venture company set up between the China Banking Corporation (China Bank) and Manulife Philippines, a wholly owned subsidiary of the Canadian company Manulife Financial, one of the leading life insurance companies in the world. Incorporated on 23 March 2007, MCBLife provides insurance and financial products through the many China Bank outlets in the Philippines.
