= The Kingsbury =

Hotel in Colombo, Sri Lanka

- The hotel as seen from the Chaithya Road

- Location within Central Colombo
- Former names: Ceylon Continental Hotel Colombo; Ceylon Inter-Continental Hotel

General information
- Type: Hotel
- Location: 48 Janadhipathi Mawatha, Galle Road, Colombo 01, Sri Lanka
- Coordinates: 6°55′58″N 79°50′31″E
- Opened: 1973; 53 years ago

Website
- www.thekingsburyhotel.com
- Company
- Type: Public
- Traded as: CSE: SERV.N0000
- ISIN: LK0084N00000
- Industry: Hospitality
- Key people: A. M. Pandithage (Executive Chairman); Rohan Karr (Managing Director)
- Revenue: ▲LKR2,022 million (2021/22)
- Operating income: ▲LKR(457) million (2021/22)
- Net income: ▲LKR(427) million (2021/22)
- Total assets: ▲LKR4,304 million (2021/22)
- Total equity: ▼LKR1,127 million (2021/22)
- Owner: Hayleys (36.08%); Carbotels (Pvt) Ltd (23.40%); Employees' Provident Fund (10.56%)
- Parent: Hayleys

The Kingsbury, trading as The Kingsbury PLC, formerly the Ceylon Continental Hotel Colombo and the Ceylon Inter-Continental Hotel, is a nine-story hotel located at 48, Janadhipathi Mawatha, Galle Road in the city centre of Colombo 01, Sri Lanka. It was built by U. N. Gunasekera, and is owned by Hotel Services (Ceylon) PLC, which is a subsidiary of Hayleys PLC. It was refurbished and reopened in January 2013.

== History ==
Unlike the 1960s resort architecture, Ceylon InterContinental was an example of high rise engineering. A bomb exploded in the nearby Central Bank of Sri Lanka building on 30 January 1996, killing at least 90 people. The hotel was damaged in the bombings.

== 2019 Sri Lanka Easter bombings ==
It was one of the sites targeted during the 2019 Sri Lanka Easter bombings on Easter Sunday (21 April 2019). At approximately 9:15 a.m., a suicide bomber detonated explosives inside the hotel during the morning breakfast service, when it was occupied by guests, including foreign tourists. The attack was part of a coordinated series of bombings against prominent hotels and churches, resulting in significant casualties nationwide, with at least 11 people reported killed at the hotel. The hotel temporarily suspended operations following the incident before reopening after security reviews and recovery efforts.

== See also ==
- Amaya Resorts & Spas, a hotel brand owned by Hayleys Group
