= Kandiah Balendra =

Sri Lankan businessman (1940–2025)

Kandiah Balend
- Born: 3 February 1940; Colombo, British Ceylon
- Died: 3 February 2025 (aged 85); Colombo, Sri Lanka
- Occupations: Chairman, South Asia Regional Fund
- Spouse: Swyrie Balendra
- Children: Natasha Balendra and Krishan Balendra

Deshamanya Kandiah "Ken" Balendra (3 February 1940 – 3 February 2025) was a Sri Lankan corporate leader and executive, who held many corporate positions in Sri Lanka and the region. He served as the first Sri Lankan chairman of John Keells Holdings Ltd., the largest conglomerate in the island. He was the chairman of Brandix Lanka Ltd. and the South Asia Regional Fund of the Commonwealth Development Corporation.

== Biography ==
=== Early life and education ===
Born in 1940 into a well-to-do, Tamil family in Colombo, his father was a revenue inspector. He was educated at the Royal College, Colombo, where he excelled in sports. He participated in the Royalist team at the 1958 Bradby Shield Encounter, where Trinity was defeated to end their streak of six consecutive victories. It was when he represented Ceylonese Rugby & Football Club, he was affectionately called as Ken from that point of time.

=== Career ===
Balendra began his career in 1963 as a planter at Finlays, an independent tea and horticultural product trader. He joined John Keells Holdings in 1969 (then known as John Keell Thompson White Ltd) and following a successful stint as a tea broker, he was appointed a company director in 1974. From 1990 until his retirement from the company in 2000 he served as its chairman, the first Sri Lankan to hold the position, overseeing a period of rapid growth and diversification. It was during Ken's tenure that witnessed a massive turnaround as far as John Keells Holdings was concerned when it transformed into Sri Lanka's biggest conglomerate from being a colonial-era tea broking house.

He served as chairman of the Bank of Ceylon (2000–2002), the Ceylon Tobacco Company (2003–2008), the Securities and Exchange Commission (2000–2002), the Insurance Board of Sri Lanka, and the Ceylon Chamber of Commerce (1998–2000). In April 200, Balendra was appointed the first president of the Sri Lanka Institute of Directors. He was a director at Chevron Lubricants Lanka until his resignation in 2011, having served over 10 years.

In 2011 The Sunday Leader named Balendra as one of "The 20 Billionaires of Sri Lanka's Stock Market". He was featured in 11th place, with holdings said to be worth nearly 2.5 billion Rupees.

=== Personal life and death ===
Balendra married Swyrie, a doctor, in 1969. They had a daughter and a son named Natasha (Ex Chairperson of the National Child Protection Authority) and Krishan, who has served as the chairman of the Colombo Stock Exchange since mid-2011. Krishan was educated at INSEAD in France and the University of London.

Kandiah Balendra died in Colombo, Sri Lanka on 3 February 2025, on his 85th birthday.

== Honours and recognition ==
- Awarded the Sri Lankan national honour Deshamanya by President Chandrika Kumaratunga (1998).
- Appointed Honorary Consul General of the Republic of Poland in Sri Lanka.
- Awarded The Cavaliers Cross of the Order of Merit of Poland (2007).
- Named Sri Lankan of the Year (1998) & voted the Most Effective Business Leader in Sri Lanka (2003) since independence in a poll conducted by the Lanka Monthly Digest magazine.
