= List of hotels in Sri Lanka =

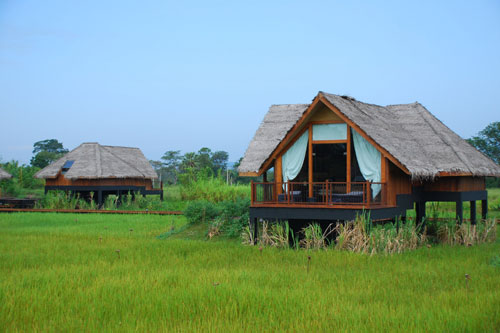
Jetwing Vil Uyana, Sigiriya is an eco hotel built on an abandoned paddy field.

According to the Sri Lanka Tourism Development Authority (SLTDA), there are 156 classified tourist hotels and 228 unclassified tourist hotels in Sri Lanka. Additionally, there are 40 boutique hotels, 51 boutique villas and 895 bungalows in the country. The classified hotels collectively have a capacity of 15,214 rooms, including 28 five-star hotels and 28 four-star hotels. SLTDA's grading is based on the criteria set by the World Tourism Organization. In 2011, the classified hotels accounted for 70% of the total room capacity in the industry. A number of accommodation facilities that built during the British colonial era have been converted to high-class hotels later. These include the Galle Face Hotel, the Grand Oriental Hotel, the Mount Lavinia Hotel, the Queen's Hotel, Kandy, the Grand Hotel and St. Andrew's Hotel and the New Oriental Hotel.

== Central Province ==
=== Kandy District ===
Hotel	Location	Opened	Chain	Proprietor	Class	Number of rooms	Notes
Cinnamon Citadel Kandy	Kandy	1983	Cinnamon Hotels & Resorts	Kandy Walk Inn, a subsidiary of John Keells Hotels PLC	4 stars	119	The hotel's main deck is decorated with Dumbara weaving designs, a UNESCO World Cultural Heritage, and an 18-foot handwoven wall hanging by Ena de Silva.
Empire Hotel	Kandy	1898	—N/a	Manor House Concepts	—N/a	14	
Helga's Folly	Kandy	1960s	—N/a	Helga De Silva Blow Perera	—N/a	16	An Art Nouveau boutique hotel. Kelly Jones of Stereophonics wrote the song "Madame Helga" after staying at the hotel.
Hotel Suisse	Kandy		Ceylon Hotels	The Kandy Hotels Company (1938) PLC, a subsidiary of Ceylon Hotels Corporation	—N/a	83	Used as the HQ of the South East Asia Command during World War II under the command of the Earl Mountbatten.
Mahaweli Reach Hotel	Kandy	1973	—N/a	Mahaweli Reach Hotels PLC, a subsidiary of Universal Enterprises	5 stars	108	The first five-star hotel in Kandy.
The Kandy House	Gunnepana	2005	—N/a	Manor House Concepts	—N/a	9	Dates back to 1804.
The Manor House	Nugawela	1998	—N/a		—N/a	10	Former Nugawela Walauwa
Queen's Hotel	Kandy	1869	Ceylon Hotels	The Kandy Hotels Company (1938) PLC, a subsidiary of Ceylon Hotels Corporation	—N/a	80	The oldest hotel in Kandy.

=== Matale District ===
Hotel	Location	Opened	Chain	Proprietor	Class	Number of rooms	Notes
Heritance Kandalama	Kandalama	1994	Heritance Hotels & Resorts	Kandalama Hotels (Pvt) Ltd, a sub-subsidiary of Aitken Spence Hotel Holdings	5 stars	152	Designed by Geoffrey Bawa. The first hotel in Asia to be accredited with the Green Globe standard.
Hunas Falls Hotel	Elkaduwa	1971	—N/a	Hunas Holdings PLC	—N/a	31	Opened 1971 with prime minister Sirimavo Bandaranaike in attendance.
Jetwing Vil Uyana	Sigiriya	2006	Jetwing Hotels	Jetwing Hotels	—N/a	36	In 2023, Condé Nast Traveller named the hotel as one of the 15 best eco-hotels in the world.

=== Nuwara Eliya District ===
Hotel	Location	Opened	Chain	Proprietor	Class	Number of rooms	Notes
Alpine Hotel	Nuwara Eliya		—N/a	Alpine Hotel (Pvt) Ltd	—N/a	30	Dates back to 1914 built Planter's Home
The Grand Hotel	Nuwara Eliya	1891	Tangerine Hotels	The Nuwara Eliya Hotels Company PLC	4 stars	154	The Nuwara Eliya Hotels Company purchased Barnes Hall in 1891.
Heritance Tea Factory	Kandapola	1996	Heritance Hotels & Resorts	Hethersett Hotels Ltd (a subsidiary of Aitken Spence Hotel Holdings)	4 stars	50	The hotel won the merit award at the UNESCO Asia Pacific Heritage Awards in 2001.
The Hill Club	Nuwara Eliya		—N/a	Hill Club Co. Ltd	—N/a	45	Founded as a gentlemen's club in 1876; did not admit locals or women until 1967.
St. Andrew's Hotel	Nuwara Eliya	1891	Jetwing Hotels	Jetwing Hotels	3 stars	56	Built in 1875. Acquired by Jetwing Hotels in 1986.

== Northern Province ==
=== Jaffna District ===
Hotel	Location	Opened	Chain	Proprietor	Class	Number of rooms	Notes
Jetwing Jaffna	Jaffna	2016	Jetwing Hotels	Yarl Hotels (Pvt) Ltd	2 stars	55	The tallest building in Jaffna.
Tilko Jaffna City Hotel	Jaffna	2010	—N/a	Tilko Jaffna City Hotel (Private) Limited	—N/a	42	The first star-class hotel in Jaffna.

== Southern Province ==
=== Galle District ===
Hotel	Location	Opened	Chain	Proprietor	Class	Number of rooms	Notes
Amangalla	Galle	1865	Aman Resorts	Aman Resorts	—N/a	33	Built in 1684. Formerly known as the New Oriental Hotel.
Cinnamon Bentota Beach	Bentota	1967	Cinnamon Hotels & Resorts	Ceylon Holiday Resorts, a subsidiary of John Keells Hotels PLC	5 stars	159	Designed by Geoffrey Bawa. The first resort hotel in Sri Lanka.
Closenberg Hotel	Galle	1965	—N/a	Perera Abeywardena family	—N/a	20	Built in 1860 on the ruins of a Dutch fort. Originally named Villa Marina.
Galle Fort Hotel	Galle	2001	—N/a	A subsidiary of Lankem Ceylon	—N/a	12	Lankem Ceylon acquired the hotel from an Australian investor in 2011.
Heritance Ahungalla	Ahungalla	1981	Heritance Hotels & Resorts	Aitken Spence Hotel Holdings	5 stars	152	Originally known as the Triton Hotel, named after the Greek god Triton. The first five-star beach resort in Sri Lanka.
Jetwing Lighthouse	Galle	1997	Jetwing Hotels	The Lighthouse Hotels PLC, a subsidiary of Jetwing Hotels	5 stars	85	Designed by Geoffrey Bawa
Nooit Gedacht Hotel	Unawatuna	1991	—N/a		—N/a	38	Built in 1735 as a Dutch colonial mansion.
Saman Villas	Bentota	1995	Jetwing Hotels		—N/a	27	The first luxury boutique hotel in the country.
The Fortress Resort & Spa	Koggala	1973	—N/a	The Fortress Resorts PLC, an associate company of Vallibel One	—N/a	53	Formerly called Club Horizon Hotel, Koggala. Built like a fortress enclosing a Dutch-era villa.

== Uva Province ==
=== Badulla District ===
Hotel	Location	Opened	Chain	Proprietor	Class	Number of rooms	Notes
Bandarawela Hotel	Bandarawela	1894	Aitken Spence Hotels and Resorts	Millers Ltd, a subsidiary of Cargills (Ceylon)	—N/a	33	The hotel was declared an archaeological conserved building and a monument on 23 January 2009.

== Western Province ==
=== Colombo District ===
Hotel	Location	Opened	Chain	Proprietor	Class	Number of rooms	Notes
Cinnamon Grand Colombo	Colombo	1975	Cinnamon Hotels & Resorts	Asian Hotels and Properties PLC, a subsidiary of John Keells Holdings	5 stars	501	Formerly known as the Lanka Oberoi Hotel.
Cinnamon Lakeside Colombo	Colombo	1981	Cinnamon Hotels & Resorts	Trans Asia Hotels PLC, a subsidiary of Asian Hotels and Properties PLC	5 stars	346	Previously known as the Ramada Renaissance Hotel. During the Commonwealth Heads of Government Meeting 2013, some of the heads of State stayed at the hotel.
Cinnamon Life at City of Dreams Sri Lanka	Colombo	2024	Cinnamon Hotels & Resorts	Waterfront Properties, a subsidiary of John Keells Holdings	—N/a	800	The first integrated resort in Sri Lanka and the largest private investment in the country. It is planned to open in the third quarter of 2024.
Cinnamon Red Colombo	Colombo	2014	Cinnamon Hotels & Resorts	Capitol Hotel Holdings, a joint venture of Sanken, John Keells Holdings, and a Singaporean firm	3 stars	243	Sri Lanka's first 'lean luxury' hotel.
Galadari Hotel	Colombo	1984	—N/a	Galadari Hotels Lanka PLC, a subsidiary of Galadari Brothers	3 stars	450	The hotel was previously managed by Le Méridien and JW Marriott Hotels.
Galle Face Hotel	Colombo	1864	—N/a	Galle Face Hotel Company Ltd	3 stars	156	One of the oldest hotels east of Suez Canal.
Grand Oriental Hotel	Colombo	1875	—N/a	Bank of Ceylon	2 stars	80	
Hilton Colombo	Colombo	1987	Hilton Hotels & Resorts	Hotel Developers (Lanka) Ltd, a state-owned enterprise of the Government of Sri Lanka	5 stars	382	Delisted from the Colombo Stock Exchange in 2020. Owned by Hotel Developers (Lanka) Ltd, a wholly owned state-owned enterprise.
Hilton Colombo Residences	Colombo	1998	Hilton Hotels & Resorts	Hirdaramani Group	4 stars	165 apartments	One of the tallest buildings in Sri Lanka.
ITC Ratnadipa	Colombo	April 2024	ITC Hotels	WelcomHotels Lanka Pvt. Ltd (a subsidiary of ITC Limited)	—N/a	352	ITC Hotel's first international investment
The Kingsbury	Colombo	1973	—N/a	Hayleys	5 stars	229	
Mount Lavinia Hotel	Mount Lavinia	1877	—N/a	Mount Lavinia Hotel Group	4 stars	275	
NH Collection Colombo	Colombo	2017	NH Collection	Softlogic Holdings	5 stars	219	It is the first five-star-class hotel to be launched in Colombo in 25 years.
Shangri-La Colombo	Colombo	2017	Shangri-La Hotels and Resorts	Shangri-La Hotels and Resorts	5 stars	500	
Taj Samudra	Colombo	1980	Taj Hotels	TAL Lanka Hotels	5 stars	300	One of the oldest five-star hotels in Colombo.
Tintagel Colombo	Colombo	2005	Paradise Road Hotels	Bandaranaike family	—N/a	10 suites	The former town residence of the Bandaranaike family. In 1959, Prime Minister S. W. R. D. Bandaranaike was fatally shot on the verandah of the house.

=== Kalutara District ===
Hotel	Location	Opened	Chain	Proprietor	Class	Number of rooms	Notes
Blue Water Hotel	Wadduwa	1998	—N/a	Union Resorts	5 stars	100	The hotel was designed by Geoffrey Bawa.
