= Hunas Falls Hotel =

Hotel in Sri Lanka

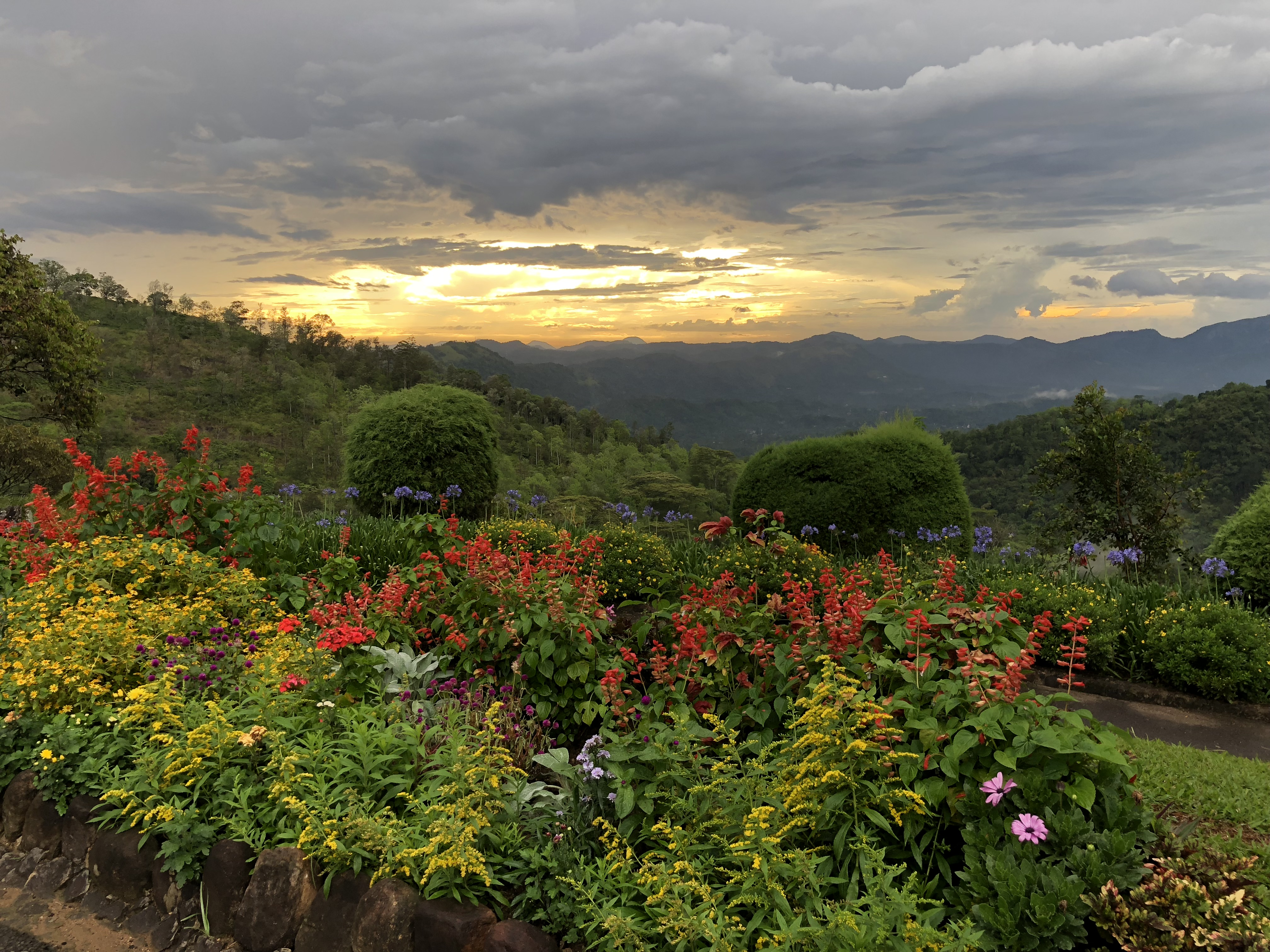
- Scenery from the garden of the hotel

General information
- Type: Hotel
- Architectural style: Mid-century modern
- Town or city: Elkaduwa
- Country: Sri Lanka
- Coordinates: 7°24′04.0″N 80°41′27.0″E
- Opened: 1971
- Owner: Hunas Holdings PLC

Design and construction
- Architect(s): Selvaratnam and Perera

Other information
- Number of rooms: 28
- Number of suites: 3
- Number of restaurants: 2

Website
- www.hunasfallshotelkandy.com

Company
- Formerly: Hunas Falls Hotels PLC
- Company type: Public
- Traded as: CSE: HUNA.N0000
- ISIN: LK0210N00001
- Key people: Dhanuka Samarasinghe (Chairman)
- Revenue: ▲LKR906 million (2023)
- Net income: ▲LKR(411) million (2023)
- Total assets: ▲LKR5,550 million (2023)
- Total equity: ▲LKR2,500 million (2023)
- Parent: Serenity Lake Leisure (Pvt) Ltd

Hunas Falls Hotel is a boutique hotel in Elkaduwa, Sri Lanka. The hotel is located about 23 kilometres (14 mi) from Matale and about 24 kilometres (15 mi) from Kandy, in Matale District. Eponymous Hunnas Falls is located on the grounds of the hotel. Hunas Holdings PLC (formerly known as Hunas Falls Hotels PLC) is the owner and operator of the hotel. Hunas Falls Hotel opened in 1971 with prime minister Sirimavo Bandaranaike in attendance. The government took control of the hotel in 1976 from Colombo Commercial Company. Subsequently, the hotel was privatised in 1991 and a Hayleys-Jetwing joint venture acquired a controlling stake. Hunas Falls Hotels Ltd was listed on the Colombo Stock Exchange in 1993. Jetwing managed the Hunas Falls Hotel under its brand name. When Hayleys acquired Amaya Leisure, Amaya assumed the management of the hotel.

In 2019, Hayleys received an offer from Serenity Lake Leisure, a Japanese investment company, to buy the hotel. Hayleys accepted the offer which was valued at LKR700 million at LKR187 per share. Hunas Falls Hotels PLC changed its name to Hunas Holdings in February 2022. In 2023, the company signed an agreement with Azotels to develop high-end villas and management of the hotel. The hotel has 28 rooms and three suites. The amenities of the hotel include a six-hole golf course.

== History ==
Hunas Falls Hotel commenced operations in 1971. Prime minister Sirimavo Bandaranaike attended the opening ceremony. The hotel and Hunasgiriya Estate were taken over by the Government of Sri Lanka in 1976 from Colombo Commercial Company. Hunas Falls Hotel was privatized in 1991 for LKR12 million. Corporate investors allotted 60% of the stake of shares, while the public issue of shares was 30%. A Hayleys-Jetwing joint venture acquired the majority of the stake. The hotel company was listed on the Colombo Stock Exchange in 1993.

Following the acquisition, Jetwing managed Hunas Falls Hotel under its hotel brand. In 2009, Hayleys increased its stake in the hotel to 50.1% from 46.9%. In the same year, Hayleys divested its stakes in the Lighthouse Hotel, Vil Uyana and Seashells Hotel (currently known as Jetwing Sea) while acquiring a controlling stake in the Ceylon Continental Hotel. After Hayleys acquired Amaya Leisure, Amaya took over the management of Hunas Falls Hotel.

In January 2019, Hunas Falls Hotels PLC announced that the company had received an offer from a prospective buyer to purchase its whole 66.2% shareholding. At the time, Carbotels, a wholly owned subsidiary of Hayleys, held 50.22% of the stake, and Amaya Leisure held 15.98%. In light of the announcement, the share price of the company reached a record high. A few days later, the company announced it had accepted the offer and signed a sale and purchase agreement with Serenity Lake Leisure, a Japanese investment company. The value of the transaction was almost LKR700 million at LKR187 per share.

== Hunas Holdings ==
Serenity Lake Leisure Ltd transferred LKR4.25 billion in assets to Hunas Falls Hotels PLC in December 2021. The share transfer consisted of 11 entities, including seven controlling stakes. Hydropower plants, plantation companies and hotels, including the Boulder Garden Hotel, were among the transferred entities. Hunas Hotels PLC changed its name to Hunas Holdings PLC on 7 February 2022. In March 2023, Hunas Holdings announced that its fully owned subsidiary Hunas Falls Hotels Pvt Ltd agreed with Adrian Zecha-led Azotels to develop and manage the Hunas Falls Hotel. The agreement was to develop high-end villas on the land next to the hotel. The company signed an agreement with Board of Investment of Sri Lanka to invest US$12 million for a facelift of the hotel.

== Amenities ==
The road to the hotel runs through tea plantations. Hunas Falls Hotel is situated at 1,097 metres (3,599 ft) above sea level. The hotel has 28 rooms and three suites. The Katsura Suite is decorated in Japanese style and the Highlander Suite is influenced by Scottish decor. The hotel has a swimming pool, a herbal health centre, and a clubroom for teenagers. The firm Selvaratnam and Perera is the architects of the hotel. The hotel's architecture is described as a planer form of the classic modern movement of aesthetics. The hotel also has a six-hole golf course.

== See also ==
- List of hotels in Sri Lanka
- List of companies listed on the Colombo Stock Exchange
- List of Sri Lankan public corporations by market capitalisation
