= Empire Hotel =

Empire Hotel or The Empire Hotel may refer to:

- Empire Hotel, Fortitude Valley, Brisbane, Queensland, Australia
- Empire Hotel, Queenstown, Tasmania, Australia
- Empire Landmark Hotel, Vancouver, Canada
- Empire Subang, Subang Jaya, Selangor, Malaysia
- Empire Hotel, Dunedin, New Zealand
- Empire Hotel, Kandy, Sri Lanka
- Empire Hotel, Bath, England
- The Empire Hotel (New York City), U.S.

== See also ==
- McAllister Tower Apartments, San Francisco, building formerly housing Empire Hotel
