= Sembuwatta Lake =

Sembuwatta Lake සෙම්ඹුවත්ත වැව செம்புவத்தை குளம்
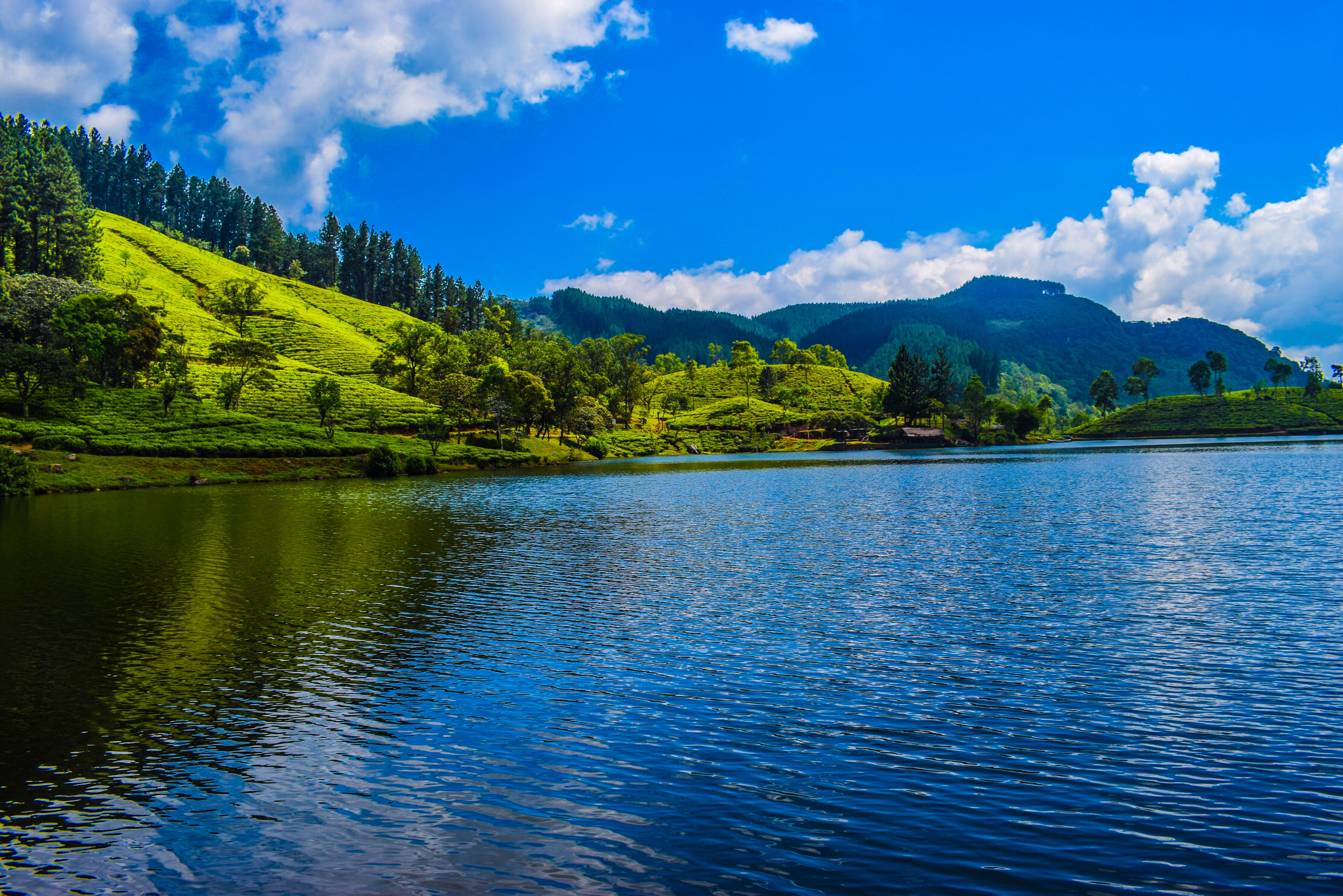
- Sembuwatta Lake

- Location within Sri Lanka
- Location: Elkaduwa
- Coordinates: 7°26′13″N 80°41′59″E
- Type: Reservoir
- Basin countries: Sri Lanka
- Max. depth: 9–12 m (30–39 ft)
- Surface elevation: 1,074 m (3,524 ft)

Sembuwatta Lake (Sinhala: සෙම්ඹුවත්ත වැව) is a tourist attraction situated at Elkaduwa tea plantation in the Matale District of Sri Lanka, adjacent to the Campbell's Lane Forest Reserve. Situated approximately 25 km (16 mi) from the main road, the lake is a man-made lake noted for its scenic surroundings and unique integration with the natural landscape. It is estimated to be 9–12 m (30–39 ft) deep and is fed by a natural spring, which forms a nearby swimming pool.

The lake offers visitors opportunities for leisure walking and nature observation. While swimming in the lake itself is not permitted, the nearby spring pool allows recreational swimming. The site offers panoramic views, the Loolecondera and Elkaduwa tea estates, and the Hanthana and Ambuluwawa mountain ranges. Birdwatching is possible, though not formally developed as an activity.

The lake area includes other features such as the Hunnas waterfall, adding to its attraction. Visitors can also visit nearby tea plantations, such as Loolecondera and Elkaduwa estates, and the Hanthana mountain range.

== Access ==
An approach to Sembuwatta Lake passes through the Campbell's Lane Forest Reserve, located approximately 25 km (16 mi) from the main road. A small entrance fee is required for access. The lake area offers opportunities for leisure walking and hiking, with nearby attractions including the Hunnas Waterfall and views of the Knuckles Mountain Range.

== Infrastructure Development ==
Currently, the lake belongs to the Elkaduwa Plantations and produces electricity for the nearby villagers. In 2005, the lake and its surroundings were redeveloped as a tourist destination under the leadership of the superintendent of Elkaduwa Plantations, Radley Dissage. He spearheaded the project by adding summer huts, a guest house, a natural swimming pool, and improved water management facilities. The lake also plays a role in local infrastructure, with its water used for electricity generation to serve nearby villages.
