= Mahaweli Reach Hotel =

Hotel in Kandy, Sri Lanka

- logo of the hotel

General information
- Type: Hotel
- Town or city: Kandy
- Country: Sri Lanka
- Coordinates: 7°19′31.0″N 80°37′52.0″E
- Opened: 1973; 52 years ago

Design and construction
- Architect(s): Ashley de Vos

Other information
- Number of rooms: 108
- Number of suites: 4
- Number of restaurants: 3
- Number of bars: 1

Website
- www.mahaweli.com

Company
- Company type: Public
- Traded as: CSE: MRH.N0000
- ISIN: LK0118N00006
- Industry: Hospitality
- Key people: M. U. Maniku (Chairman); J. A. Panabokke (Managing Director)
- Revenue: ▲LKR375 million (2022)
- Operating income: ▲LKR(108) million (2022)
- Net income: ▲LKR(176) million (2022)
- Total assets: ▼LKR1,724 million (2022)
- Total equity: ▼LKR824 million (2022)
- Owners: Universal Enterprises Pvt. Ltd (69.44%); Freudenberg Shipping Agencies Ltd. (6.44%); J. A. Panabokke (4.05%)
- Number of employees: ▼201 (2022)

Mahaweli Reach Hotel, traded as Mahaweli Reach Hotels PLC, is a five-star luxury hotel in Kandy, Sri Lanka. The hotel is located on the banks of the Mahaweli River, hence the name. The hotel was founded in 1973 and in 1982, it was listed on the Colombo Stock Exchange. Mahaweli Reach became the first five-star hotel in Kandy in 2000. Universal Enterprises, a Maldivian resort operator has been the controlling shareholder of the hotel since 2002. Mahaweli Reach, a hotel with colonial architecture, was designed by Ashley de Vos.

== History ==
John Atul Panabokke established the hotel in 1973 after quitting his career as a planter. Panabokke converted his house with 4.5 acres (1.8 ha) garden into an 'A' grade tourist guesthouse comprising four rooms and six staff members. Subsequently, the hotel was expanded to 23 rooms in 1976 and 50 rooms in 1982. By 1998, the hotel consisted of 115 rooms with two suites. On 29 October 2000, the hotel was accredited with a five-star classification and became the first five-star hotel in Kandy. In 2002, Universal Enterprises, a Maldivian resort operator, acquired a stake in the company worth LKR282 million. The hotel intended to utilise the funds to settle an outstanding loan to DFCC Bank, which has been a financial burden to the company.

Mohamed Umar Maniku was appointed as the chairman of the hotel company in 2012 following the death of L. R. Panabokke, the founding director and chairperson. The hotel obtained ISO 9001:2008 certification in 2015. Mahaweli Reach chose Zhara Hospitality Suite as its online booking engine which was developed by JKCS in 2015. The company received the Zero Carbon Hotel Stay accreditation in 2019 by The Sustainable Future Group. Bidya Devi Bhandari, the president of Nepal, stayed at the hotel during her visit to Kandy for the closing ceremony of the United Nations' International Vesak Day celebrations. The hotel was affected by the en masse cancellation of wedding receptions due to the COVID-19 pandemic in 2021. Eleven out of 20 weddings planned to host in the hotel were postponed.

== Operations ==
The hotel is located on the south bank of the Mahaweli river, 4.5 kilometres (2.8 mi) from the city centre. The hotel's amenities include a swimming pool, a tennis court, river boat cruises, a spa, snooker and table tennis facilities. All rooms are facing the Mahaweli River. The hotel has conference facilities which can accommodate 300 guests. Mahaweli Reach, a colonial architecture hotel, has kept vintage cars on display for the benefit of the guest experience. The hotel is decorated with wall hangings of Ena de Silva. The hotel is the title sponsor for the Mahaweli Reach Tennis tournament. It is a junior tennis tournament and the eighth edition of the tournament took place in 2019.

== See also ==
- Cinnamon Citadel Kandy, another hotel located on the banks of the Mahaweli River
- List of hotels in Sri Lanka
- List of companies listed on the Colombo Stock Exchange
