= Jetwing Symphony =

Hospitality company in Sri Lanka

Jetwing Symphony PLC
- Logo of Jetwing Symphony
- Company type: Public
- Traded as: CSE: JETS.N0000
- ISIN: LK0455N00002
- Industry: Hospitality
- Founded: 2007; 19 years ago
- Headquarters: Colombo, Sri Lanka
- Key people: Hiran Cooray (Chairman); Shiromal Cooray (Executive director)
- Revenue: ▲LKR2.116 billion (2023)
- Operating income: ▲LKR467 million (2023)
- Net income: ▲LKR(632) million (2023)
- Total assets: ▼LKR10.422 billion (2023)
- Total equity: ▼LKR3.321 billion (2023)
- Owners: Jetwing Travels (19.32%); R.O.K. International Holdings (15.10%); Blue Oceanic Beach Hotel (13.64%)
- Website: www.jetwingsymphony.com

Jetwing Symphony PLC is a hotel chain in Sri Lanka. The company was incorporated in 2007. Following an oversubscribed Initial Public Offering in December 2017, the company started publicly trading on the Colombo Stock Exchange in January 2018. Jetwing Symphony is the holding company of the Jetwing Group's new hotels. As of 2022, Jetwing Symphony manages seven properties across the country.

== History ==
The company was incorporated in 2007 as Jetwing Airport Hotel Pvt Ltd. The name was changed to Jetwing Symphony in November 2011 and changed its legal status to a limited company in the following month. Jetwing Symphony announced its initial public offering (IPO) in 2017. The company offered 10% of its stake and hoped to raise LKR750-900 million. The company planned to employ the capital to build Jetwing Kandy Gallery and settle the debts of some of its properties. IPO which opened on 14 December was oversubscribed. Jetwing Symphony made its debut trading on the Colombo Stock Exchange in January 2018 following its IPO.

== Operations ==
Jetwing Symphony posted a profit for the first time in March 2019 after going public. The company acts as the holding company for the new hotel of the Jetwing Group. The company suffered from 2019 Sri Lanka Easter bombings, as the attacks affected the tourism in Sri Lanka.

== Properties ==
Jetwing Symphony manages seven properties across Sri Lanka. Jetwing Yala is situated near the Palatupana entrance of the Yala National Park. Jetwing Kaduruketha is one of the first eco-resorts in Sri Lanka. Jetwing Colombo Seven was opened in February 2017. The newest property of the Jetwing Symphony, Jetwing Kandy Gallery was opened in January 2020. The hotel consists of 26 rooms.

Hotel	Location	No. of rooms
Jetwing Colombo Seven	Colombo	98
Jetwing Kaduruketha	Wellawaya	25
Jetwing Kandy Gallery	Kandy	26
Jetwing Lake	Dambulla	94
Jetwing Safari Camp	Yala	10
Jetwing Surf	Pottuvil	20
Jetwing Yala	Yala	80

== See also ==
- List of companies listed on the Colombo Stock Exchange
