= Hilton Colombo Residences =

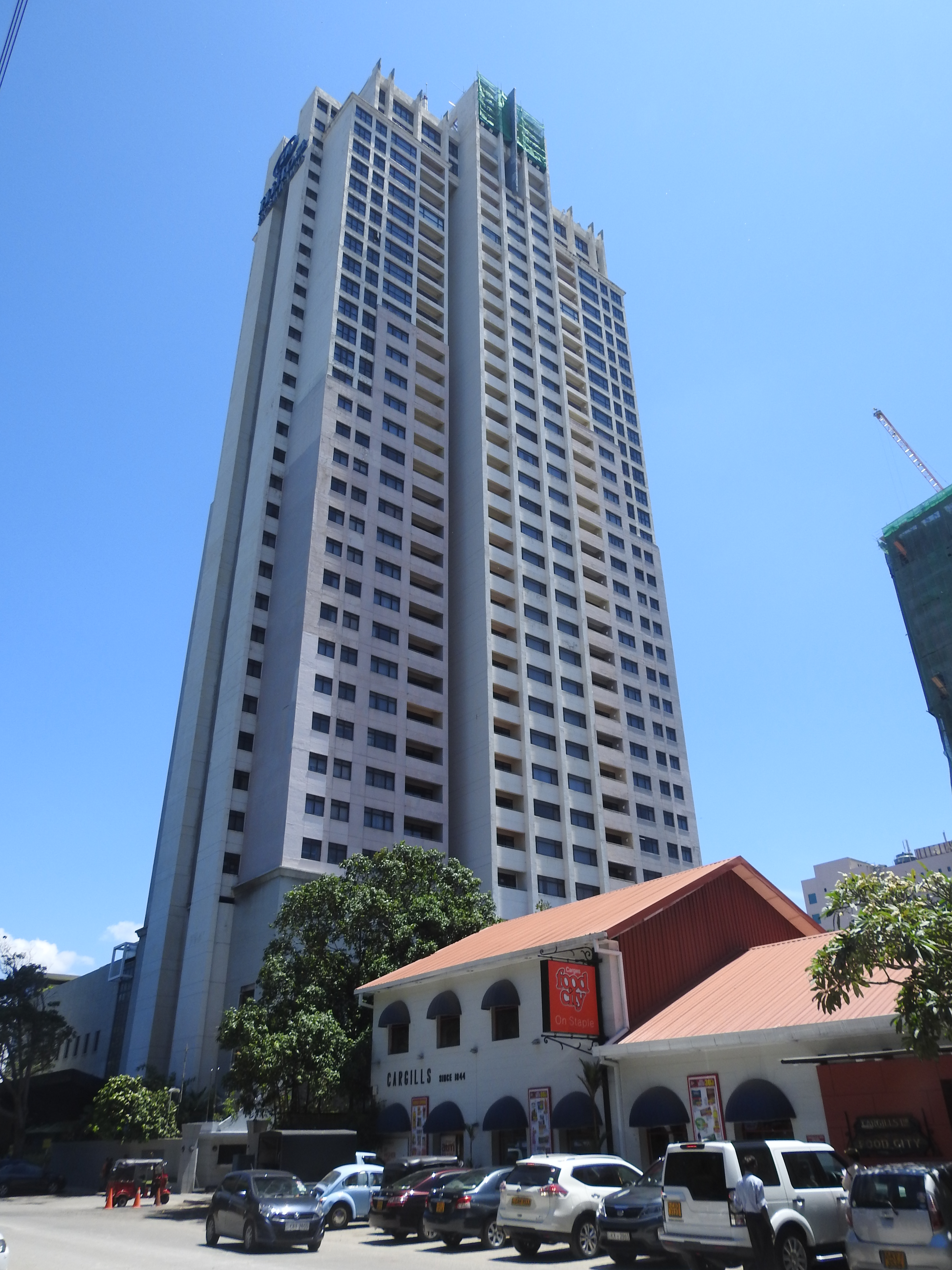
- The view of the building from Staple Street
- Hotel chain: Hilton Hotels & Resorts

General information
- Town or city: Colombo
- Country: Sri Lanka
- Coordinates: 6°55′14.0″N 79°51′22.2″E
- Opened: 1998
- Owner: Hirdaramani Group
- Height: 129 metres (423 ft)

Technical details
- Floor count: 34

Other information
- Number of suites: 165 apartments
- Number of restaurants: 2

Website
- Official webpage

Hilton Colombo Residences is a five-star luxury hotel located in Colombo, Sri Lanka. The hotel was formerly known as JAIC Hilton. The name derived from its initial owner Japan Asia Investment Company, who sold the hotel to Sri Lankan conglomerate, Hirdaramani Group in 2003. It is one of the tallest buildings in Sri Lanka. It is the second Hilton brand hotel in Sri Lanka, while the first was Hilton Colombo.

== History ==
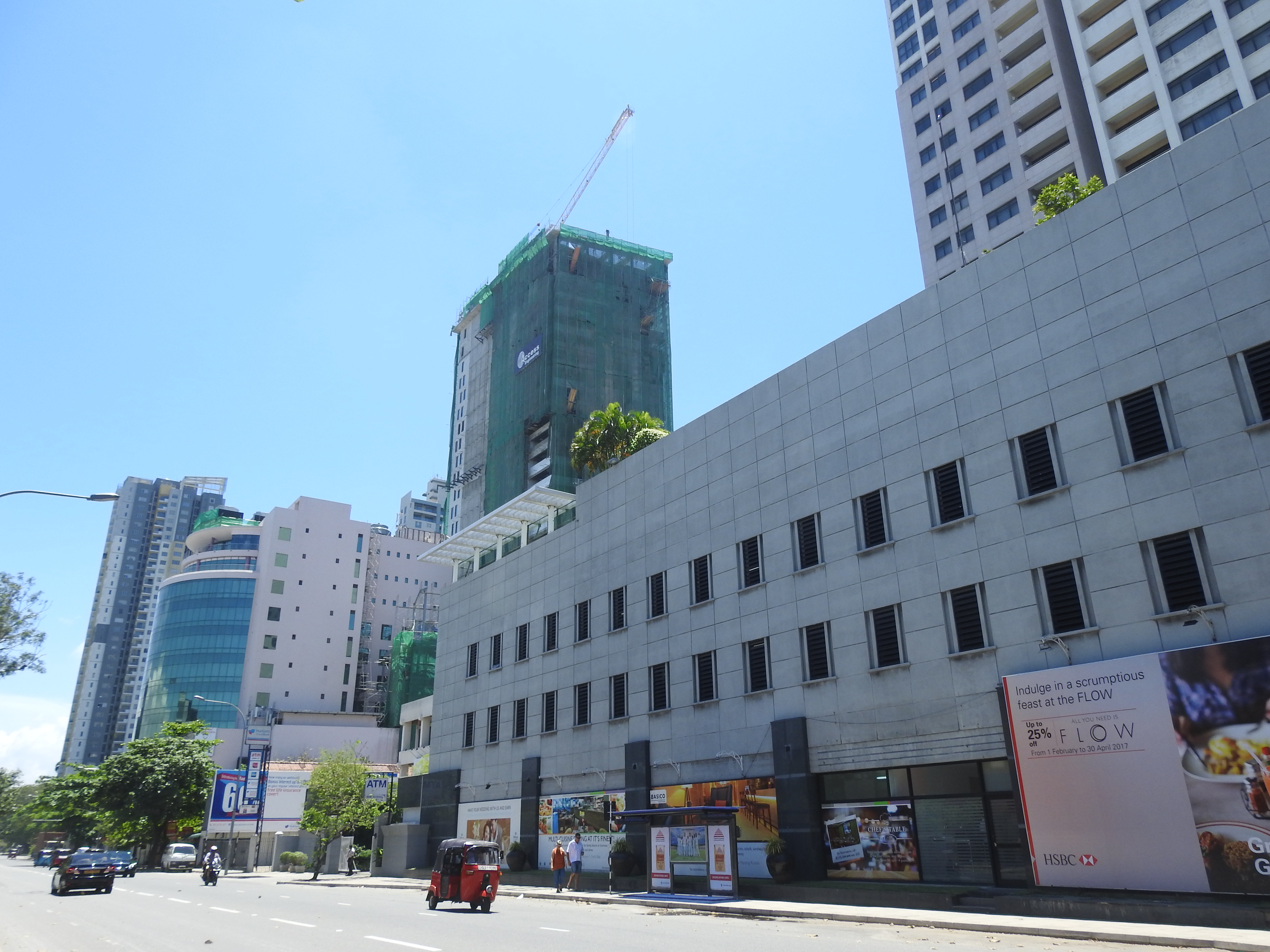
The Union Place facade of the ground floor

The hotel commenced operations in 1998. The hotel received Tripadvisor's certificate of excellence for seven consecutive years in 2017. The 20th anniversary of the hotel was celebrated in 2018. A new logo was launched at the event. The 100th Anniversary of Hilton Hotels & Resorts was celebrated in the hotel on 31 May 2019. The celebrations involved 12,000 staff members across nine Southeast Asian countries. The goal of the celebration was to impact communities and surprise guests. At the time, the hotel employed two staff members with disabilities. In 2021, Polic arrested seven persons involved in a scamming scheme in a raid at the hotel. The culprits were staying at the hotel conducting their activities via social media.

== Amenities ==
The hotel is consist of 165 apartments that can be rented for a day, a week or a month. The swimming pool and a bar and a restaurant are exclusive to the residents of the hotel. BASICO is the bar lounge of the hotel and FLOW is the buffet restaurant. FLOW was launched in 2015 as a multi-cuisine restaurant with a seating capacity of 168 guests.

== See also ==
- List of hotels in Sri Lanka
