= Jetwing Vil Uyana =

Sri Lankan eco hotel

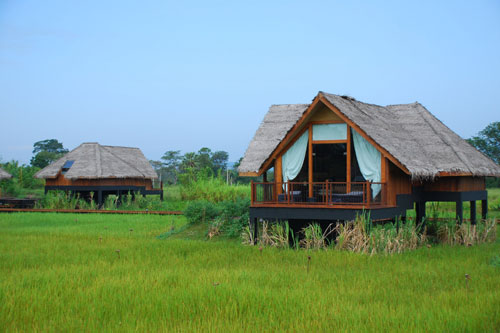
- a paddy dwelling
- Interactive map of the Jetwing Vil Uyana area
- Hotel chain: Jetwing Hotels

General information
- Architectural style: Eco-architecture
- Location: Sigiriya, Sri Lanka
- Coordinates: 7°55′50.0″N 80°43′15.0″E
- Opened: 2006
- Owner: Jetwing Hotels

Design and construction
- Architect: Sunela Jayawardena

Other information
- Number of rooms: 36
- Number of restaurants: 3

Website
- www.jetwinghotels.com/jetwingviluyana/

Jetwing Vil Uyana (Sinhala: ජෙට්විංග් විල් උයන, lit. 'Jetwing Lake Garden') is a boutique eco hotel situated in Sigiriya, Sri Lanka. Jetwing Vil Uyana was launched in 2006 and inspired by the Barnes Wetland, London. Jetwing Vil Uyana is owned and operated by the Sri Lankan hotel chain Jetwing Hotels. The hotel was built in 2006 by converting an abandoned paddy field into an artificial wetland. Environmental architect Sunela Jayawardena designed the hotel. The hotel is known for its sustainability. In 2023, Condé Nast Traveller listed the hotel among the 15 best eco-hotels in the world.

== History and architecture ==
Jetwing Vil Uyana was launched in 2006 and was inspired by the Barnes Wetland, London. Jetwing Vil Uyana has featured in National Geographic Traveler's 2013 June edition of "The World's Best Ecolodges". Jetwing Vil Uyana is constructed on an artificially built wetland. The hotel is situated in the vicinity of Sigiriya. Sunela Jayawardena who is known for her environmental architecture, designed the hotel. In 2004, an abandoned paddy field was converted into a 28-acre nature reserve.

== Sustainability ==
In 2023, Condé Nast Traveller named the hotel as one of the 15 best eco-hotels in the world. Jetwing Hotels started the Jetwing Youth Development Project (JYDP) in 2006. Under the JYDP, the company offered a job training program for local youth around the Jetwing Vil Uyana Hotel. At the end of the program, about 50 graduates were hired by Jetwing. The JYDP programme has won several awards over the years.

The faunal diversity of the hotel has increased since the construction of the hotel. The biodiversity of the hotel consists of 157 bird species, 29 mammalian species, and several butterfly, reptilian and amphibian species. A study conducted on the hotel in 2017 concluded that Jetwing Vil Uyana employs innovative marketing activities. Multi-dimensional innovations such as the novel hotel concept have implemented by the hotel to gain competitive advantage through differentiation.

== Amenities ==
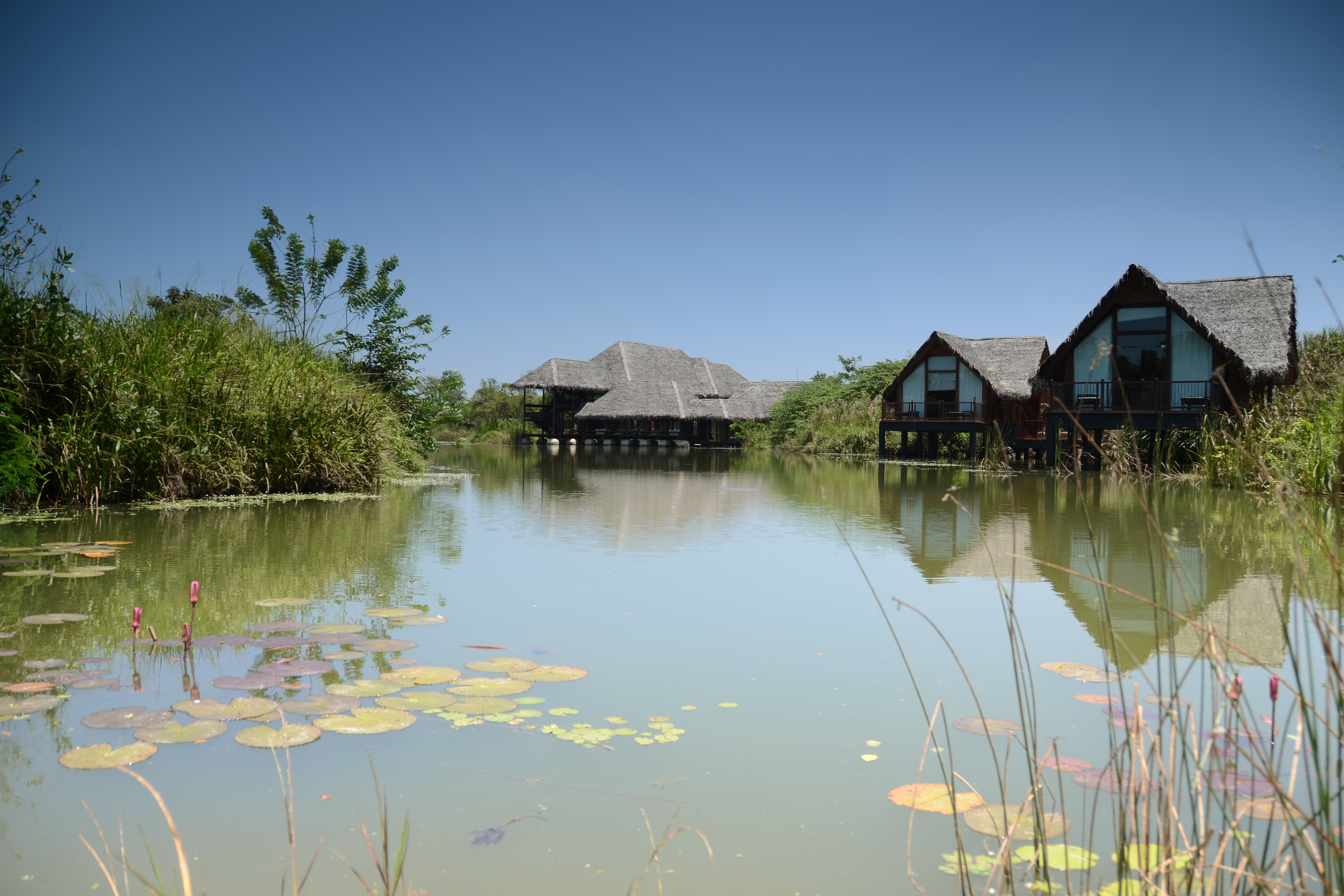
Jetwing Vil Uyana is built on an artificial wetland

The accommodations are categorised by the habitat in which they are located. The five habitats are forest, marsh, paddy, garden, and lake; Of which forest, marsh, and paddy dwellings are built on stilts. There are 36 dwellings altogether, but only some have private pools. Apsara is the name of the hotel's restaurant which is located above the swimming pool. Although dinner and lunch serve a set menu, an à la carte is also available. The hotel's other dining options include a cafe named Sulang, which offers casual dining, and the bar Graffiti. The central complex contains an underground wine cellar and a viewing platform.

== See also ==
- List of hotels in Sri Lanka
