= Empire Hotel, Kandy =

Hotel in Kandy, Sri Lanka

Olde Empire Hotel
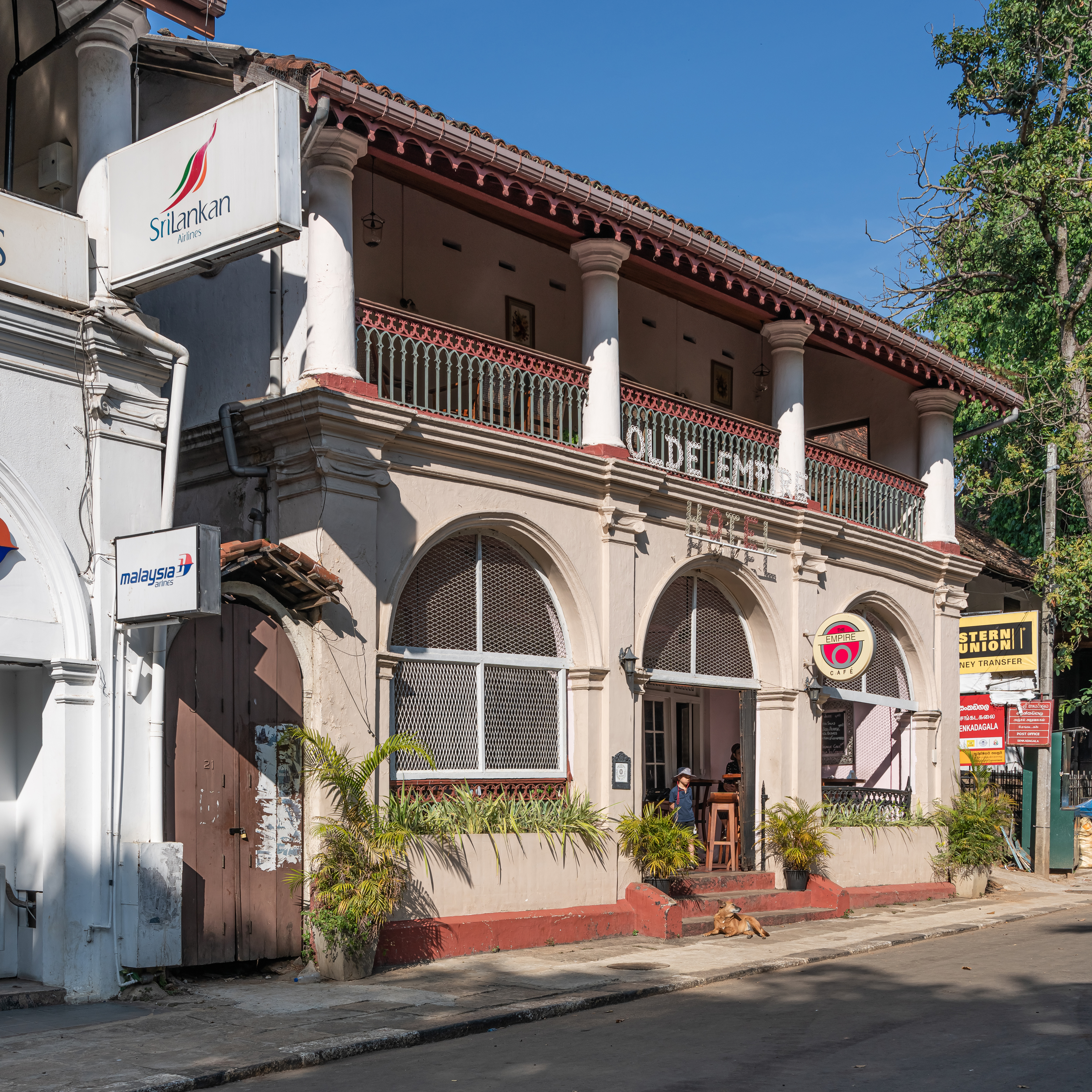

- Location within Sri Lanka

General information
- Location: Kandy, Sri Lanka, 21 Temple Street, Kandy, Sri Lanka
- Coordinates: 7°17′37.17″N 80°38′20.07″E
- Opening: 27 December 1898; 127 years ago

Technical details
- Floor count: 2

Other information
- Number of rooms: 14
- Number of restaurants: 1

Website
- http://www.oldeempirehotel.com/

Archaeological Protected Monument of Sri Lanka
- Designated: 8 July 2005

The Empire Hotel, Kandy or Olde Empire Hotel, is a small two-storey heritage hotel located on Temple Road in the Kandy city centre.

The hotel is located opposite the park/garden (Mahamaluwa) of the Temple of the Sacred Tooth Relic (Sri Dalada Maligawa), adjacent to Queens Hotel and the former Kandy court complex.

The hotel was opened on 27 December 1898 by Porolis C. Fernando and it has been operated by the Fernando family ever since. The building was originally built in 1857 as a coffee factory (kopi kale) before being converted to a hotel. In 1998 it was designated as a 'Conserved Building' by the UNESCO as part of the listing of Kandy as a World Heritage City.

On 8 July 2005 it was formally included as an 'Archaeological Protected Monument' by the government.

The Victorian-style building, features three white stone arches on the ground floor, with an open verandah and cast iron balustrades on the first floor, supported by four stone doric columns, and a half round tile roof. The entire upstairs floor has polished wooden floorboards on timber beams. The upstairs verandah commands a view over Kandy Lake and provides a viewing platform for guests to watch the Kandy Esala Perahera.

The hotel was used as a pub in the 1940s/50s but was converted by the owners into a guest house/budget hotel in the 1970s.

It has 14 bedrooms upstairs, with the entrance being from Colombo Road at the back of the building. The hotel has communal bathrooms for guests.

In July 2010 the hotel caught fire, sustaining damage to the upper floor and roof. It was subsequently repaired and restored.

In January 2014 Manor House Concepts took over the lower floor of the building and renovated the two downstairs dining rooms into a single café, fronting Temple Street.

== See also ==
- Queen's Hotel, Kandy
- Suisse Hotel
