= Ceylon Hotels Corporation =

Hospitality company in Sri Lanka

Ceylon Hotels Corporation PLC
- Company type: Public
- Traded as: CSE: CHOT.N0000
- ISIN: LK0032N00009
- Industry: Hospitality
- Founded: 1966; 60 years ago
- Headquarters: Colombo, Sri Lanka
- Key people: Lakshman Samarasinghe (Chairman); Sanjeev Gardiner (Executive director)
- Revenue: ▲LKR878 million (2023)
- Operating income: ▼LKR(196) million (2023)
- Net income: ▼LKR(152) million (2023)
- Total assets: ▲LKR14.385 billion (2023)
- Total equity: ▼LKR9.775 billion (2023)
- Owners: National Development Bank/Ceylon Hotel Holdings (33.46%); Ceylon Hotel Holdings (21.10%); Employees' Provident Fund (11.95%)
- Number of employees: ▲398 (2023)
- Parent: Ceylon Hotel Holdings
- Subsidiaries: The Kandy Hotels Company (1938) PLC
- Website: www.chcplc.com

Ceylon Hotels Corporation PLC, often called Ceylon Hotels, is a hospitality company in Sri Lanka. The company was incorporated through an Act of the Parliament of Ceylon in 1966. The company was listed as a public company in the following year. Ceylon Hotel Holdings, a subsidiary of Galle Face Hotels Group is the holding company of Ceylon Hotels Corporation. Ceylon Hotels' subsidiary, Kandy Hotels Company owns and operates the Queen's Hotel and the Hotel Suisse heritage hotels.

== History ==
Ceylon Hotels Corporation was incorporated through an Act of the Parliament of Ceylon, the Ceylon Hotels Corporation Act, No. 14 of 1966. The company was listed on the Colombo Stock Exchange in the following year. The Gardiner family who owned a 26% stake in Galle Face Hotels Group, acquired a 35% stake in the Ceylon Hotels Corporation on 8 July 2005.

Ceylon Hotels signed an agreement with Cinnovation-CG Corp's Zinc Hospitality Lanka to set up a joint venture, Ceylon Holidays Holdings in 2014. Ceylon Holidays Holdings was a fully owned subsidiary of Ceylon Hotels, Zinc Hospitality Lanka agreed to invest LKR250 million for a 50% of stake in Ceylon Holidays Holdings. The two parties agreed to develop properties under CHC Rest Houses, a subsidiary of Ceylon Holidays Holdings. Ceylon Hotels through its subsidiary, United Hotels Company acquired Ceylon Hotels Maldives, a firm which was developing a resort in the Maldives. Ceylon Hotels Maldives entered into a joint venture with Zhen Hua Engineering Company Limited, a subsidiary of China Harbour Engineering Company. Through the joint venture, an 85-100 room resort was planned to be built in Anbaraa island of Vaavu Atoll of Maldives. However, in 2021, Ceylon Hotels decided to divest its 50% stake in the joint venture for US$4.49 million. The resort was planned to open in 2020 but instead reported losses in 2020 and 2021.

== Operations ==
=== The Kandy Hotels Company (1938) PLC ===
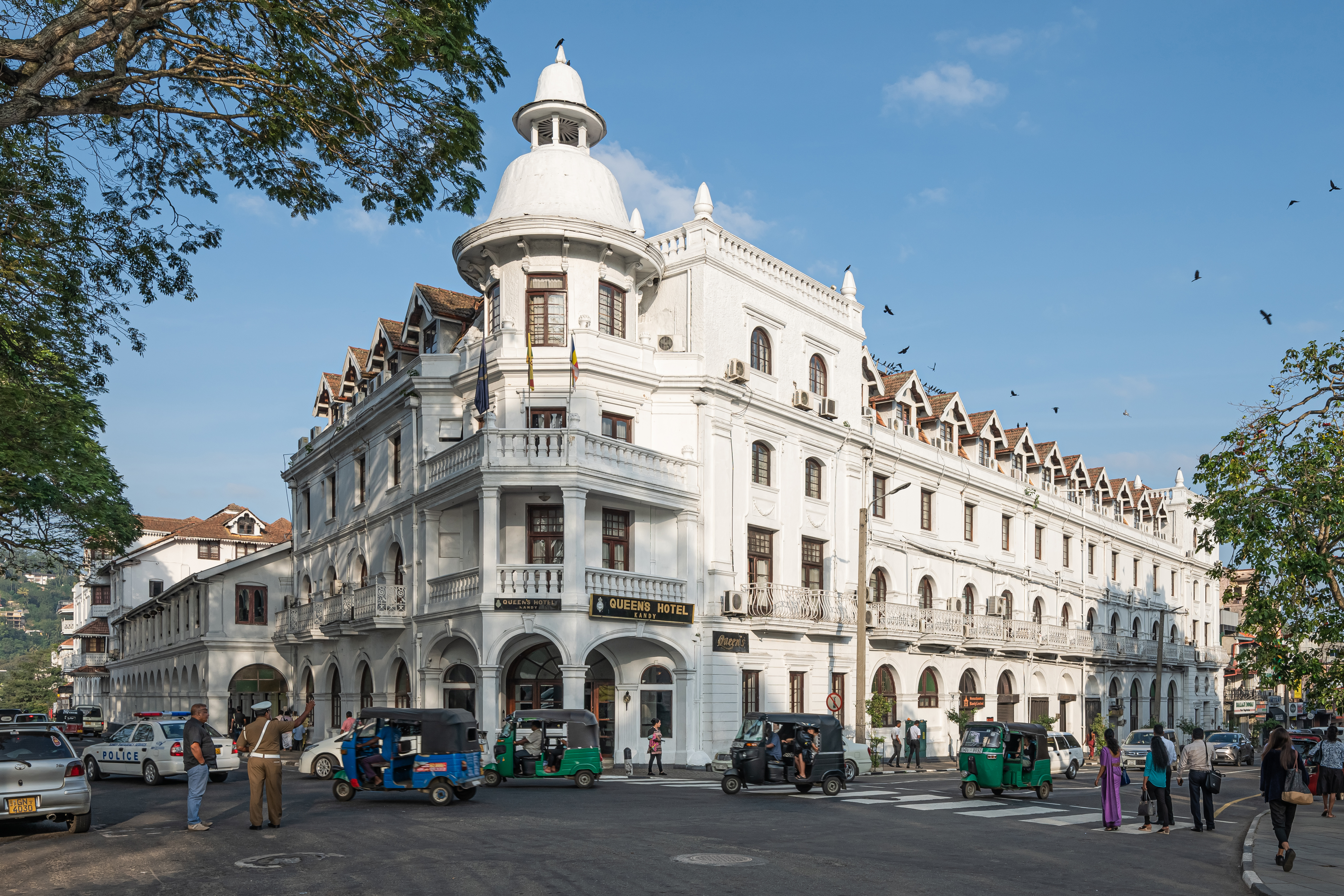
The heritage hotel, the Queen's Hotel is owned by the Kandy Hotels Company, a subsidiary of Ceylon Hotels Corporation

The Kandy Hotels Company (1938) PLC is a subsidiary of Ceylon Hotels Corporation. As of 2022, Ceylon Hotels holds a 69.54% stake in the Kandy Hotels Company. The Kandy Hotels Company is the owner and operator of the Queen's Hotel and the Hotel Suisse. Kandy Hotels Company entered into an agreement with Sino Lanka Hotel Holdings to set up a joint venture to build OZO Kandy in 2012. OZO Kandy was planned to have 120 rooms. OZO Kandy officially opened in 2015. The hotel has been rebranded as Radisson Hotel Kandy in 2022.

=== EKHO Hotels and CHC Rest Houses ===
EKHO Hotels is a hotel brand operated by Ceylon Hotels' subsidiary, United Hotels Company. Through Ceylon Holiday Holdings, its joint venture with Zinc Hospitality Lanka owns and operates several rest houses across the country.

== See also ==
- List of companies listed on the Colombo Stock Exchange
