= Saman Villas =

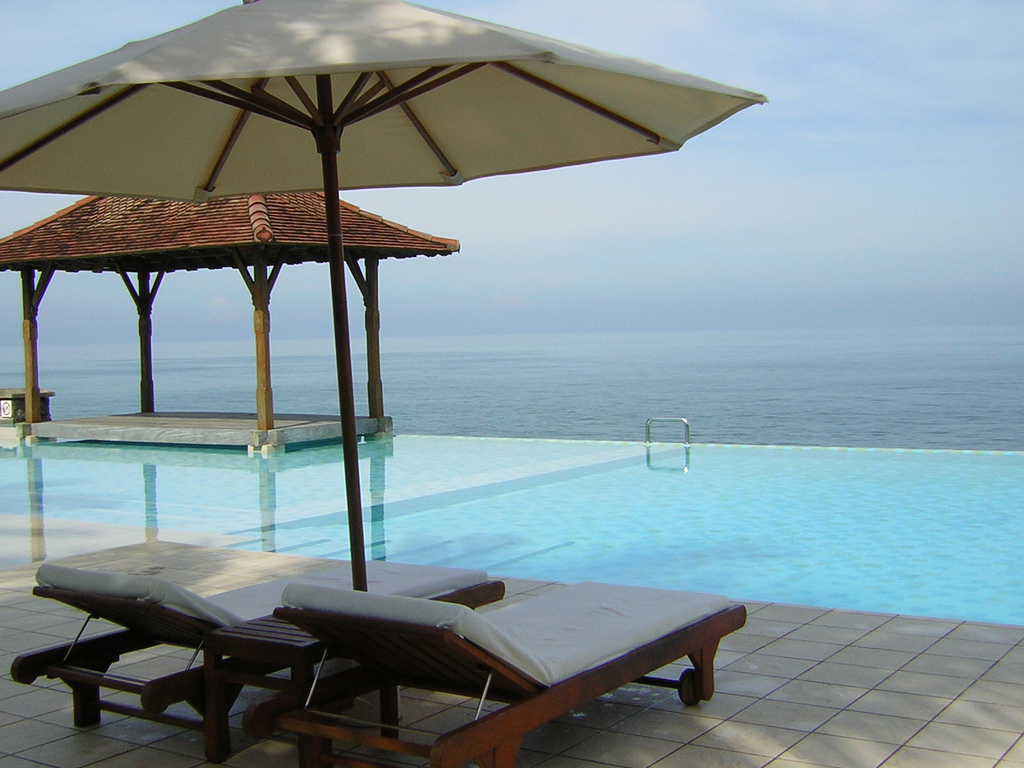

- Location within Sri Lanka

General information
- Location: Aturuwella, Bentota, Sri Lanka
- Coordinates: 6.395511°N 80.00455°E
- Opening: 25 December 1995
- Owner: Jetwing Hotels
- Management: Saman Villas Limited

Design and construction
- Architect: Geevaka De Soyza
- Developer: Daya Ratnayake

Other information
- Number of suites: 27
- Number of restaurants: 1

Website
- https://www.jetwinghotels.com/jetwingsamanvillas/#gref

Saman Villas is located in the fishing village of Aturuwella, near the south west coastal town of Bentota, Sri Lanka. Saman Villas opened its doors on Christmas Day in 1995. It is Sri Lanka's first boutique hotel.

== Facilities ==
The hotel consists of 27 suites for guest accommodation set out in two-storey villas, some equipped with private pools, a restaurant, bar, sunset lounge, an infinity pool, library, snooker table, a jewellery shop, gym, sauna, hot tub, spa and boardroom facilities that can house up to 12 people.

== History ==
Saman Villas was originally designed to be a 72-room, 4-star hotel. However, in the early 1990s the new concept of boutique hotels was slowly evolving and taking root in some Asian countries and islands in the Pacific Ocean. This led the developer, Daya Ratnayake (the owner of the Mermaid Hotel in Kalutara), after viewing examples in Koh Samui, Thailand and Bali, Indonesia, together with the appointed architect, Geevaka De Soyza, to develop the first boutique hotel in Sri Lanka. The property that was opened for business on 25 December 1995 was introduced to the local market on 13 February 1996. The hotel's name is derived from a native jasmine, saman pichcha, a fragrant flower used in floral offerings and garlands in Buddhist temples.

== Awards ==
- 2007 Presidential Awards for Travel and Tourism - 'Best Boutique Hotel in Sri Lanka'
- 2008 Presidential Awards for Travel and Tourism - 'Best Boutique Hotel in Sri Lanka'
- 2009 Presidential Awards for Travel and Tourism - 'Best Boutique Hotel in Sri Lanka'
- 2010 Presidential Awards for Travel and Tourism - 'Best Boutique Hotel in Sri Lanka'
