= Hunnas Falls =

Waterfall in Sri Lanka

Coordinates: 7°24′07″N 80°41′23″E

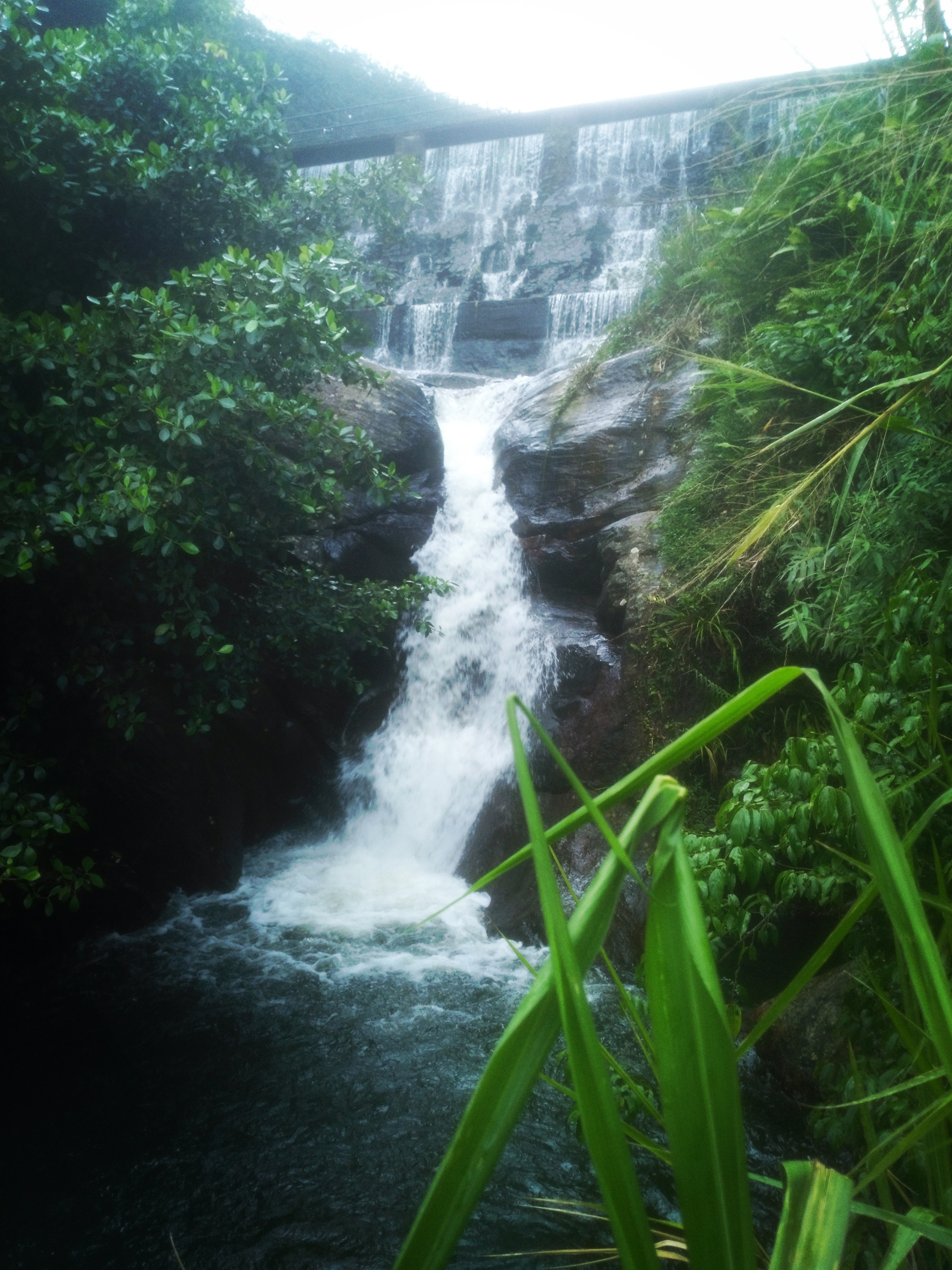
Hunnas Falls

Hunnas waterfall, also known as Hunnasgiriya falls, is located about 22 kilometres (14 mi) from Kandy, Sri Lanka. It is located in Matale District near the village of Elkaduwa. There are two roads to reach Hunnas waterfall, one is coming from Matale to Elkaduwa, and the other is Wattegama (Kandy) to Elkaduwa.

This waterfall is 48 metres (157 ft) high and at a height of 1,765 metres (5,791 ft) above sea level. It is a man-made waterfall, which is located in the landscaped garden of the Hunas Falls Hotel. It is fed by a stream from the nearby Hunnasgiriya mountain peak. Apart from the main fall, several streams can be seen during rainy seasons.

== See also ==
- List of waterfalls
- List of waterfalls in Sri Lanka
