= Hilton Colombo =

Luxury hotel in Colombo, Sri Lanka

- The hotel as seen from the York Street
- Hotel chain: Hilton Hotels & Resorts

General information
- Location: Colombo, Sri Lanka
- Coordinates: 6°55′57.4″N 79°50′41.8″E
- Opened: 1987
- Owner: Hotel Developers (Lanka) Ltd
- Operator: Hilton Hotels & Resorts

Other information
- Number of rooms: 382
- Number of suites: 36
- Number of restaurants: 7

Website
- www.hiltoncolombo1.com

Hilton Colombo is a Hilton brand five-star luxury hotel in Colombo, Sri Lanka. The hotel is owned by Hotel Developers (Lanka) Ltd. The company was incorporated in 1983 and was listed on the Colombo Stock Exchange in the following year. The hotel was launched in 1987 and the 30th anniversary was celebrated in 2017 with an issuance of a stamp and a first day cover. However, the company is delisted from the stock exchange in 2020 and solely owned by the Government of Sri Lanka, therefore, runs as a state-owned enterprise.

== History ==
The hotel is owned by Hotel Developers (Lanka) Ltd. and the company was incorporated in 1983. The company was listed on the Colombo Stock Exchange in 1984. Since its commencement, the company has had a troublesome history. As the promoters of the hotel did not have the means to finance the construction of the hotel, the Government of Sri Lanka had to provide a guarantee of the payment of a yen-loan worth LKR1.3 billion. As a security for this guarantee, the majority of the shares was transferred to the government. The land on which the hotel was built was leased from the Land Commissioner General's Department, and due to the non-payment of the land lease, the land lease was cancelled and the land was reverted. The hotel was launched in 1987 and the 30th anniversary was celebrated in 2017. To mark the occasion, a stamp and a first day cover were issued by the Sri Lanka Post. The new restaurants, Graze Kitchen and L.A.B lounge were opened after the first phase of the refurbishment. Hotel Developers (Lanka) was delisted from the Colombo Stock Exchange in 2020. The Government of Sri Lanka solely owns Hotel Developers (Lanka) Ltd and therefore, runs as a state-owned enterprise.

== Operations ==
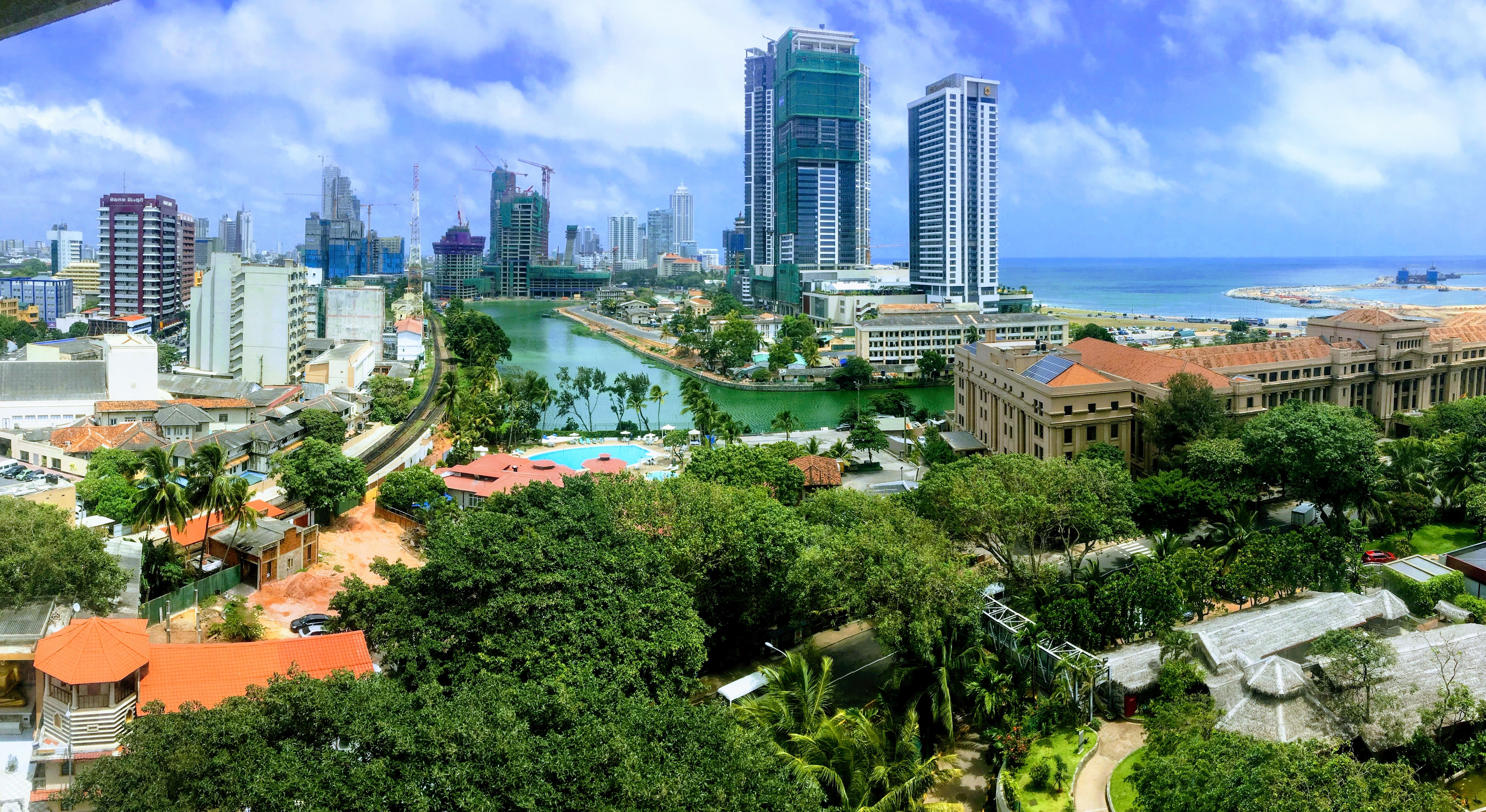
The view of the Colombo skyline from the hotel.

Hilton Colombo organises the biggest Oktoberfest in the country. The 27th annual Oktoberfest was organised in 2019 by the hotel. In 2021, Hilton was named as one of the best places to work in Sri Lanka.

== Amenities ==
The hotel is located next to the World Trade Center Colombo and has 382 rooms and 36 suites. The hotel has seven dining and entertainment venues. Graze Kitchen, the buffet restaurant; Curry Leaf, the Sri Lankan cuisine restaurant of the hotel; Cafe Kai; Stella, a karaoke lounge; L.A.B; SunsetBlu and Emperor's Wok. SunsetBlu was launched at the end of 2020 and marketed as an "all-day club". Swimming pool, fitness centre and meeting rooms are amongst other amenities of the hotel. The hotel also has meeting and banquet facilities.

== See also ==
- List of hotels in Sri Lanka
