= Cinnamon Citadel Kandy =

- The logo of Cinnamon Citadel Kandy
- Hotel chain: Cinnamon Hotels & Resorts

General information
- Town or city: Kandy
- Country: Sri Lanka
- Coordinates: 7°18′21.0″N 80°37′27.0″E
- Owner: John Keells Hotels

Design and construction
- Architect(s): Channa Daswatte

Other information
- Number of rooms: 119
- Number of suites: 2
- Number of restaurants: 3

Website
- www.cinnamonhotels.com/cinnamoncitadelkandy

Cinnamon Citadel Kandy, formerly known as The Citadel Kandy, is a four-star hotel located in Kandy, Sri Lanka. The hotel is located on the bank of the Mahaweli River. The hotel's main deck is decorated with Dumbara weaving designs and an 18-foot handwoven wall hanging by Ena de Silva.

== History ==
The 1974 annual report of British Airways mentions that its investment in Mackinnon Mackenzie was transferred to Kandy Walk Inn which was building a hotel in Kandy. The hotel was built in 1983 and was designed by the Sri Lankan architect, Channa Daswatte. The hotel was featured in the film Deveni Gamana and when John Keells Holdings took over the hotel it was used as a circuit bungalow. The hotel company was listed on the Colombo Stock Exchange formerly under the symbol "KINN", however has been delisted later. Today the hotel is a part of John Keells Hotels which trades as "JKH.N0000". John Keells Holdings launched a new brand of hotels consisting of three- and four-star resorts of John Keells Hotels Group along with The Citadel Kandy in ITB Berlin in 2006. The name of the brand is revealed to be "Chaaya Hotels & Resorts". After refurbishment, the hotel was relaunched in September 2006 as the third hotel to be relaunched under the brand Chaaya. The hotel got the present name after a rebranding in 2012. After closing for three months due to the COVID-19 pandemic the John Keells resorts reopened a few resorts including the Cinnamon Citadel in July 2020.

== Amenities ==
The hotel consists of 119 rooms and two suites and a conference hall which can accommodate 80 people. The swimming pool and the main restaurant are located on the riverside. The hotel also has a spa and a gym.

== See also ==
- List of hotels in Sri Lanka
