= Cinnamon Red Colombo =

Hotel in Colombo, Sri Lanka

- Logo of Cinnamon Red Colombo

- Alternative names: Cinnamon Red Hotel
- Hotel chain: Cinnamon Hotels & Resorts

General information
- Type: Hotel
- Architectural style: Modern
- Classification: 3-Star
- Location: Colombo, 59 Ananda Coomaraswamy Mawatha, Colombo, Sri Lanka
- Opened: 1 September 2014

Height
- Top floor: 26

Technical details
- Lifts/elevators: 2

Design and construction
- Developer: John Keells Holdings, Sanken Construction
- Main contractor: Sanken Construction

Other information
- Number of rooms: 242
- Number of suites: 1
- Number of restaurants: 1
- Number of bars: 2
- Facilities: rooftop pool, rooftop gymnasium, business centre
- Parking: 5 floors

Website
- www.cinnamonhotels.com/cinnamonredcolombo

The Cinnamon Red Colombo is a four-star Colombo City Hotel in Colombo, Sri Lanka. The 26-storey hotel is located at 59 Ananda Coomaraswamy Mawatha, Kollupitiya.

The Rs. 3.5 billion property was a tri-venture between John Keels Holdings (30%), Sanken Construction (51%) and a Singaporean 3rd party (19%). It was opened in September 2014 by the Minister of Economic Development, Basil Rajapaksa.

It is part of the Cinnamon Hotels and Resorts chain, under the management of John Keells Group. The hotel is claimed to be South East Asia's first "Lean Luxury" hotel in Colombo. The hotel has previously won awards in Culinary Arts.

Cinnamon Red is noted for its use of red colour throughout the property. The property has also hosted a "paint the town red" competition since inception, promoting local artists showcasing their talent via murals throughout the property

In 2020 the hotel was used as a paid isolation centre to facilitate seafarers arriving in the country to spend their mandatory quarantine period during the COVID-19 pandemic.
