= Alpine Hotel =

Alpine Hotel Nuwara Eliya
- Interactive map of the Alpine Hotel Nuwara Eliya area

General information
- Location: Haddon Hill Road, Nuwara Eliya, Sri Lanka
- Coordinates: 6.96257268283082°N 80.76601786171891°E
- Owner: D. G. Mahinda Kumara
- Management: Alpine Hotel Pvt. Ltd

Technical details
- Floor count: 2

Other information
- Number of rooms: 30
- Number of restaurants: 1

Website
- http://www.alpinehotel.lk/

The Alpine Hotel dates from 1914 and was built as a home of a British tea planter. Later it was bought by the Dodampa Gamage family, who rented out the rooms to visitors. Now a hotel, it retains the old colonial charms and its architecture is one of the few lasting proofs of the bygone British Era.

The hotel has 30 rooms, a restaurant, billiards room, a bar and two lounges and a coffee shop.

In 2006 the Alpine Hotel won the 'Star Award' for the best performing anthropometry in the Central Province under the large scale service sector.

== Location ==
The hotel is situated a kilometre away from Nuwara Eliya, facing the town hall and the Nuwara Eliya Racecourse, on the Main Road towards Badulla.
