= John Keells Hotels =

Sri Lankan hotel holding company

John Keells Hotels PLC
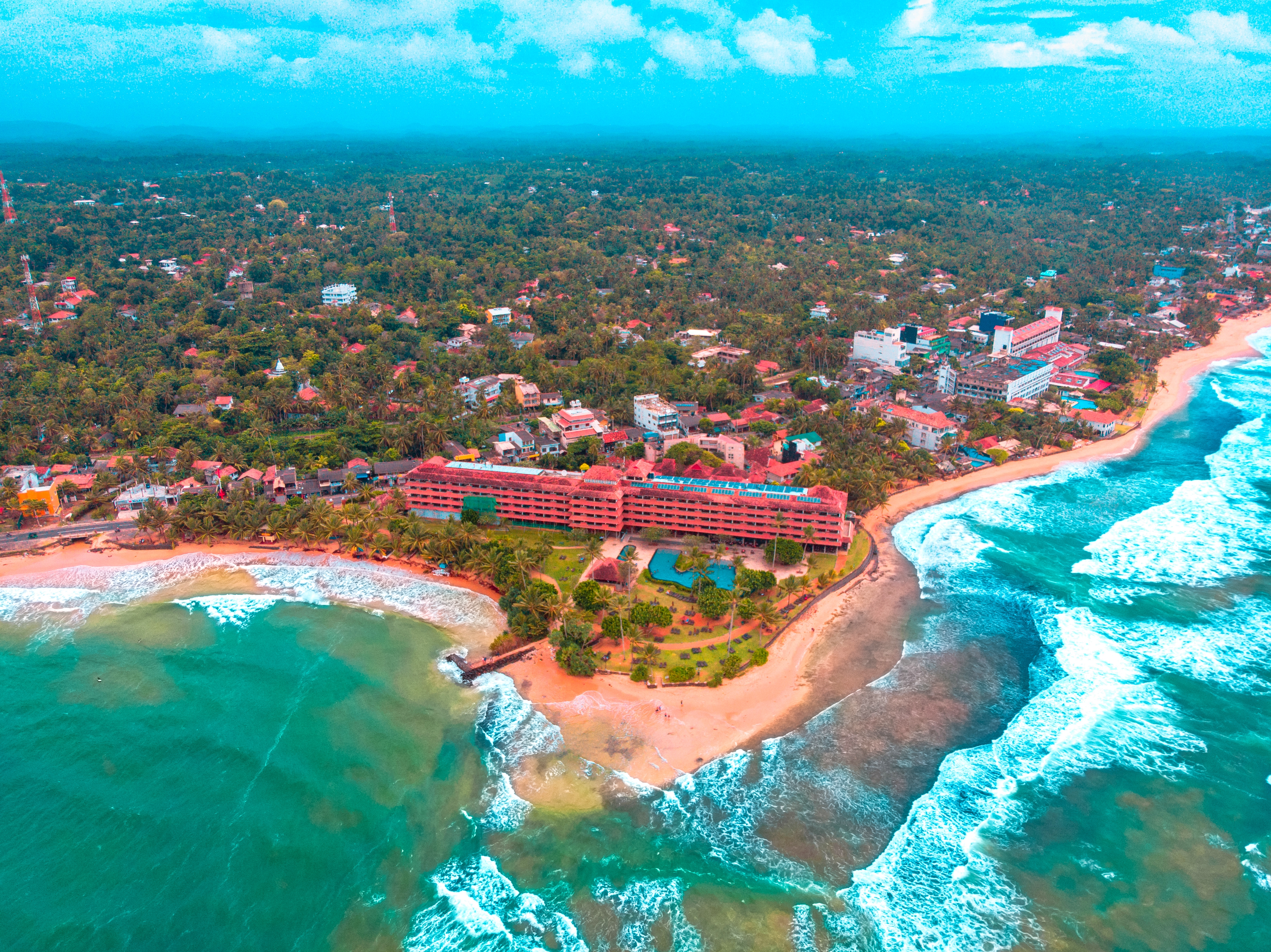
- Hikka Tranz by Cinnamon is one of the eight resorts of John Keells Hotels in Sri Lanka
- Company type: Public Subsidiary
- Traded as: CSE: KHL.N0000
- ISIN: LK0343N00000
- Industry: Hospitality
- Headquarters: Colombo, Sri Lanka
- Areas served: Sri Lanka; Maldives
- Key people: Krishan Balendra (Chairman)
- Brands: Cinnamon Hotels & Resorts
- Revenue: ▲LKR28.835 billion (2023)
- Operating income: ▲LKR1.742 billion (2023)
- Net income: ▲LKR(333) million (2023)
- Total assets: ▲LKR87.096 billion (2023)
- Total equity: ▲LKR32.598 billion (2023)
- Number of employees: ▼2,309 (2023)
- Parent: John Keells Holdings (80.23%)
- Website: www.cinnamonhotels.com

John Keells Hotels PLC is a hotel holding company in Sri Lanka. John Keells built its first resort in 1973 in Habarana. John Keells' hotel management company operated under several names. In the 1970s, the company was known as Walkers Tours Hotels. Then in the 1980s, it was known as simply Hotel Management & Marketing Services, and finally, in the 1990s, the company became to known as John Keells Hotels. John Keells ventured into the Maldives in 1996 with the acquisition of Velidhu Resort Hotel. In 2004, the hotel chain underwent a major restructuring. All resorts were brought under John Keells Hotels Limited, and the company was listed on the Colombo Stock Exchange.

The company launched Chaaya Hotels & Resorts brand in 2007. Habarana Village was the first resort to be relaunched under the new brand. Subsequently, all resorts in the hotel were relaunched under the Chaaya brand. The rebranding of the resorts in the chain for the second under Cinnamon Hotels & Resorts was completed in 2015. The company's performances were affected by the 2019 Sri Lanka Easter bombings. John Keells Hotels is one of the LMD 100 companies in Sri Lanka. The company's brand, Cinnamon Hotels & Resorts, was the most valuable hospitality brand in Sri Lanka in 2022.

== History ==
John Keells Holdings diversified into the tourism industry with the acquisition of Walkers Tours in 1972. Walkers Tours established its first hotel in Habarana in 1973. John Keells' hotel management company operated under several names throughout its history. In the 1970s, the company was known as Walkers Tours Hotels, and in the 1980s as Hotel Management & Marketing Services Limited and finally, in the 1990s, it came to be known as John Keells Hotels. By 1981, the company was managing seven resorts. Four were beach resorts on the Southern Coast, viz. Beach Hotel Bayroo (present-day Cinnamon Bey Beruwala), Swanee Hotel, Beruwala, Ceysands Hotel, Bentota, and Ambalangoda Rest House. The three resorts in the countryside were Habarana Lodge, Habarana Village and Kandy Walk Inn, which was under construction and later became Cinnamon Citadel Kandy. John Keells acquired Whittall Boustead and gained control of Bentota Beach Hotel and Coral Gardens Hotel (Present-day Hikka Tranz by Cinnamon). In 1993, John Keells owned and managed 900 rooms which accounted for 16% of the room capacity of resorts located outside Colombo. John Keells ventured into the Maldives market in 1996 with the acquisition of the 80-roomed Velidhu Resort Hotel.

John Keells hotel chain underwent a major restructuring in 2004. All resorts, including listed resorts and Maldivian resorts brought under one holding company, Keells Hotels Limited, with the intention of being listed on the Colombo Stock Exchange. The shares of the four listed companies were brought up by Keells Hotels. John Keells Hotels listed on 17 September 2004. Beach Hotel Beruwala, Coral Gardens Hotel and Club Oceanic Trincomalee were damaged by the 2004 Indian Ocean tsunami. Hakuraa Resort in Maldives was also damaged, and it predicted the resort would take six months to reopen. The Bentota Beach Hotel recommenced operations within ten days of the disaster.

John Keells Hotels introduced the "Chaaya Hotels & Resorts" brand in 2007 ITB Berlin. Habarana Village became the first resort launched under the Chaaya brand after refurbishment. The brand took its name from the Sanskrit word Chaaya meaning image. Subsequently, other resorts were also relaunched under the Chaaya brand. The company won the gold award at the ICASL Annual Report Awards in the hotel sector for the third consecutive year in 2011. The awards ceremony is organised by the Institute of Chartered Accountants of Sri Lanka. The process of rebranding Chaaya resorts under Cinnamon Hotels & Resorts was completed in 2015. John Keells invested heavily in not only visual upgrades but staff training and audit processes as well in preparation for rebranding. John Keells Hotels closed the Bentota Beach Hotel for renovations in July 2017. At the time, the hotel was a four-star 133-key property. The 2019 Sri Lanka Easter bombings and closed hotels for renovations affected the company's performance for two quarters back to back. Bentota Beach Hotel was reopened as Cinnamon Bentota Beach in December 2019 after an LKR4.9 billion renovation. The hotel upgraded to a 5-star 159-room resort.

== Operations ==
John Keells Hotels operates twelve resorts in Sri Lanka and Maldives. John Keells Hotels signed an agreement with Indra Traders to build a 160-room three-star hotel which will be called Cinnamon Red Kandy. The US$29.32 million project got the approval of the Board of Investment of Sri Lanka. John Keells Hotels is one of the LMD 100 companies in Sri Lanka. The company returned to the list in 2022 after displacing from the list in 2021. In 2022, the company was ranked 73rd on the list. The Cinnamon Hotels & Resorts brand was the most valuable hospitality brand in Sri Lanka in 2022. Brand Finance valued the brand value to be LKR3,395 million and ranked 34th in the overall brand list.

=== Properties ===
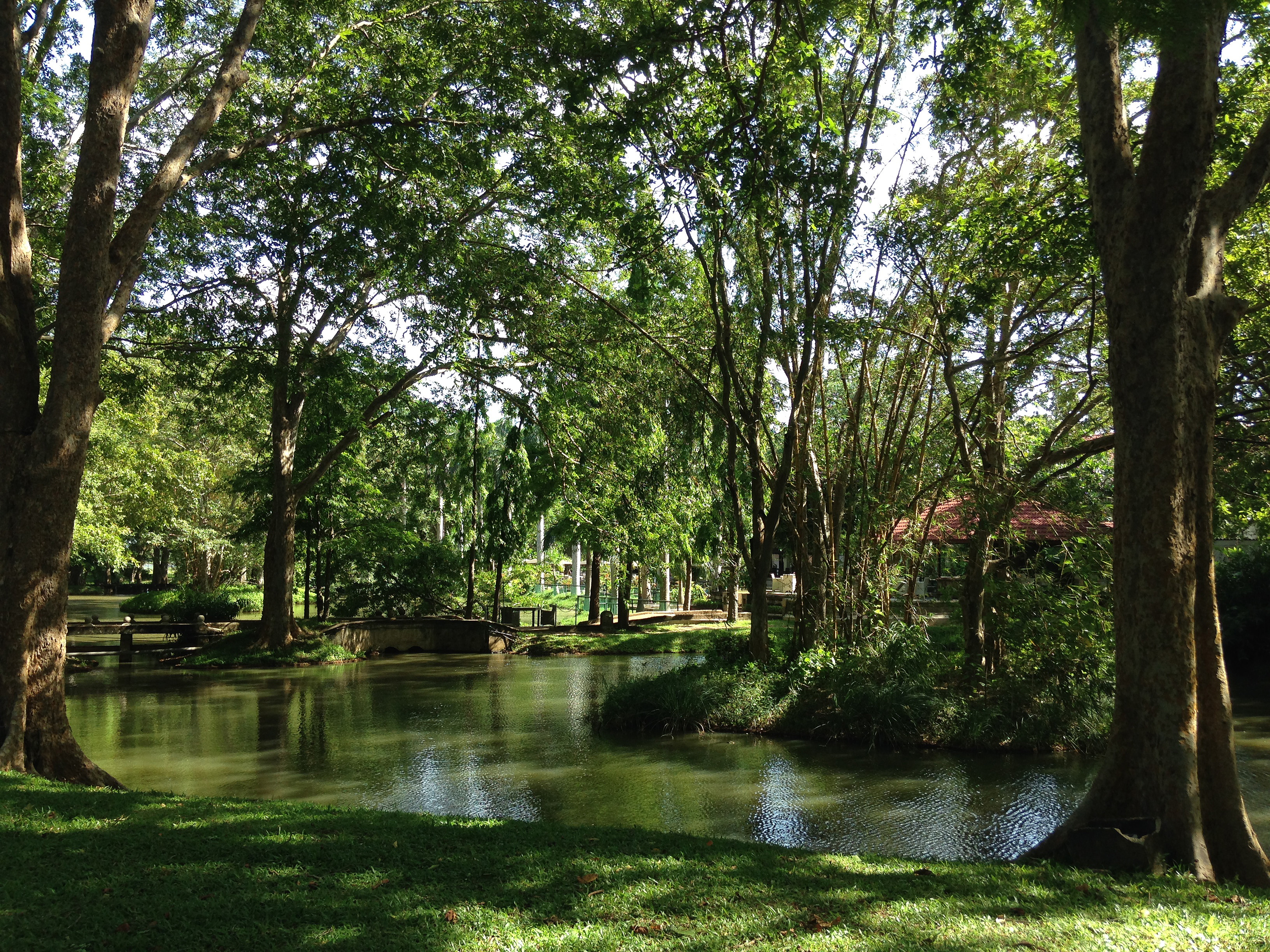
Cinnamon Lodge Habarana is the first hotel of the John Keells Hotels chain

Property	Rating	No. of rooms	Location
Sri Lanka
Cinnamon Bentota Beach	Five-star	159	Bentota
Cinnamon Bey Beruwala	Five-star	199	Beruwala
Cinnamon Citadel Kandy	Four-star	119	Kandy
Cinnamon Lodge Habarana	Five-star	138	Habarana
Cinnamon Red Kandy	Three-star	216	Kandy
Cinnamon Wild Yala	Four-star	68	Yala
Habarana Village by Cinnamon	Four-star	108	Habarana
Hikka Tranz by Cinnamon	Four-star	150	Hikkaduwa
Trinco Blu by Cinnamon	Four-star	81	Trincomalee
Maldives
Cinnamon Dhonveli Maldives	Four-star	152	Kaafu Atoll
Cinnamon Hakuraa Huraa Maldives	Four-star	100	Meemu Atoll
Cinnamon Velifushi Maldives	Five-star	90	Vaavu Atoll
Ellaidhoo Maldives by Cinnamon	Four-star	112	Alif Alif Atoll

Source: John Keells Holdings PLC Annual Report (2023, p. 150)

Under construction

== Finances ==
Ten-year financial summary
Year	Revenue LKR (mns)	Profit LKR (mns)	Assets LKR (mns)	Equity LKR (mns)	Earnings per share LKR
2023	28,835	(333)	87,096	32,598	(0.22)
2022	13,355	(1,217)	83,526	30,140	(0.83)
2021	3,661	(5,120)	62,475	24,431	(3.50)
2020	9,712	(1,201)	60,576	28,872	(0.82)
2019	11,033	832	37,250	28,897	0.56
2018	11,614	1,131	33,236	26,353	0.77
2017	12,312	1,864	32,083	24,921	1.27
2016	11,632	1,749	28,900	23,018	1.19
2015	11,444	1,868	26,749	20,446	1.27
2014	10,966	1,575	26,468	18,196	1.08

Source: Annual Report (2023, pp. 211–214)

== See also ==
- List of companies listed on the Colombo Stock Exchange
- List of Sri Lankan public corporations by market capitalisation
