= St. Andrew's Hotel =

Luxury hotel in Nuwara Eliya, Sri Lanka

Jetwing St. Andrew's
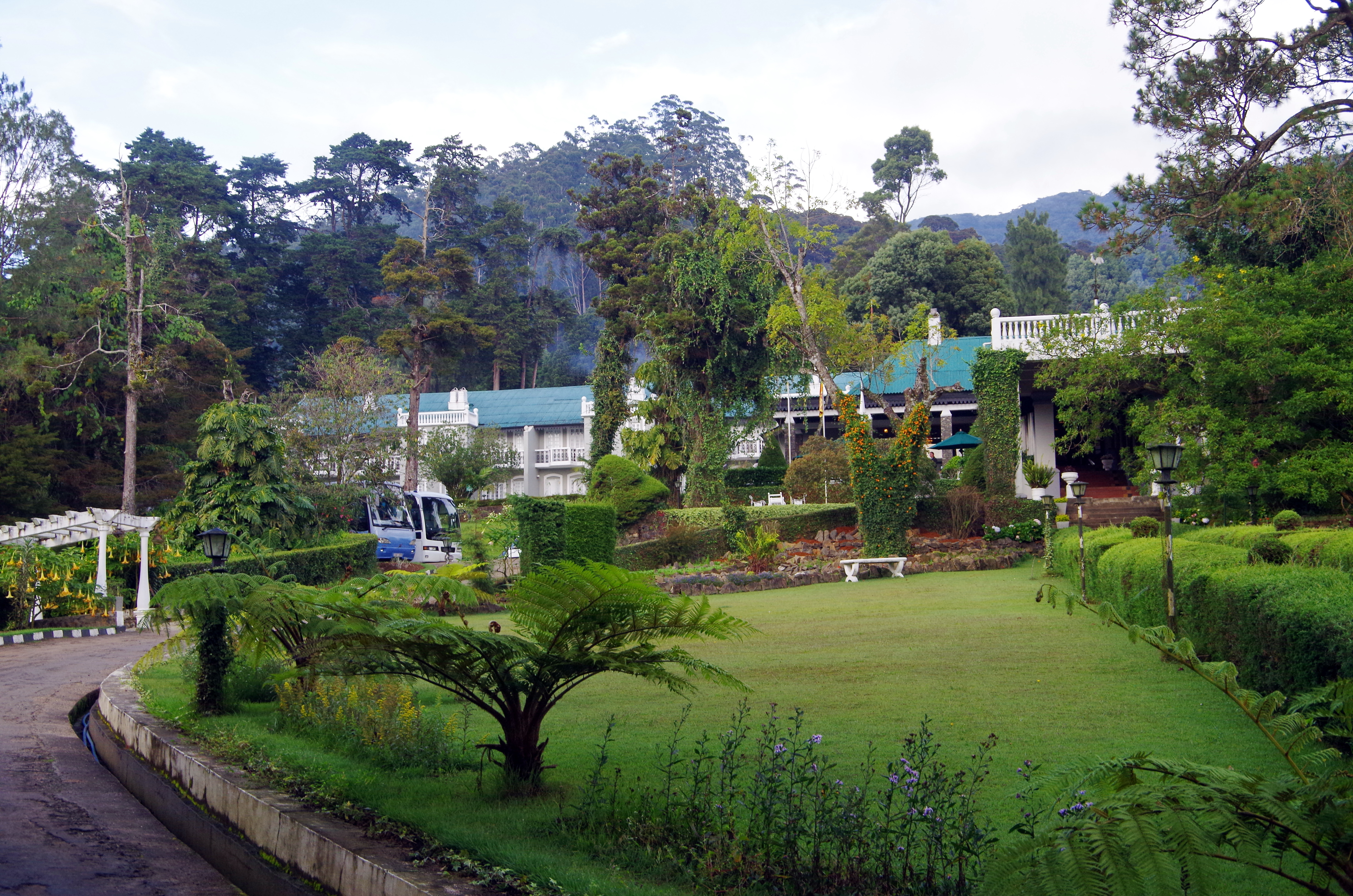
- Interactive map of the Jetwing St. Andrew's area
- Former names: St Andrew's Hotel

General information
- Location: 10 St. Andrew's Drive, Nuwara Eliya, Sri Lanka
- Coordinates: 6.979069°N 80.7638956°E
- Opening: 1891
- Management: Jetwing Hotels Ltd

Technical details
- Floor count: 2

Other information
- Number of rooms: 56
- Number of suites: 5
- Number of restaurants: 2

Website
- http://www.jetwinghotels.com/jetwingstandrews/

The St. Andrew's Hotel (known as Jetwing St. Andrew's) is a luxury hotel in Nuwara Eliya, Sri Lanka, built adjoining the Nuwara Eliya golf course.

== History ==
The first building on the property was constructed in 1875, part of land gifted to a British colonial civil servant by the Crown. The house later became the 'Scots Club'. In 1891 the club became a hotel called St. Andrew's, run by a German manager, Mr Humbert. This Scottish connection and its proximity to the Nuwara Eliya golf course could account for the title, St Andrew's, a reference to St Andrews, the traditional and historic home of golf. The golf course's 10th driving tee was originally part of the property and was exchanged for the strip of land bordering the stream at the corner of Waterfield and St Andrew's Drives extending to the bridge across the stream. Later on, garages for the cars of guests and accommodation for the drivers were built on this land. During World War I Mr Humbert was interned by the British government.

In 1918 the hotel was bought by a syndicate headed by Arthur Edward Ephraums (1879–1931). During this period the hotel was expanded to include a two-storey wing to the west, and behind the main block, a large dining room and pantry, large kitchen, storeroom, and servants quarters. Also added were bathrooms, a bar and billiard room on the east side. The newly refurbished and expanded hotel opened for business in November 1919, with James Henry De Zilwa (1888–1979), a younger cousin of Ephraums, appointed as manager. In 1924, following a disagreement with the owners, De Zilwa left St Andrews and began his own hotel business. In the late 1920s and early 1930s, the Great Depression had a major impact on all hotels in the area, including St Andrew's, and by 1930 St Andrews closed its doors.

In 1933 the De Zylwa family purchased the property and reopened the hotel, many investors who previously shunned St Andrews as a viable business suddenly became interested and made higher offers for the hotel. There were also suggestions for amalgamation with other hotels, subdivisions of the property, and a serious proposal from the Catholic Church to have St Andrews to become a monastery attached to the catholic church close by. The De Zilwa family undertook a range of improvements, including new bathroom blocks together with vegetable and flower gardens. Water from a spring to the east of the hotel was channeled down to the front garden for watering. In the 1950s the spring also supplied water for fish ponds. The current car park was formerly a tennis court and the conference room was originally a billiard room with two full size billiard tables, later this room became a dance hall, which held popular monthly dances. The current billiard room was formerly a music room.

During World War II, the British Government used the hotel as a rest and recreation centre for servicemen. The first arrivals were survivors from HMS Hermes in 1942, which was sunk by Japanese dive bombers off the east coast of Ceylon. In later post war years the main attraction in Nuwara Eliya was the races from February to April, with many jockeys, trainers and their families staying at the hotel during the racing season. St Andrews also had stables, originally built by Ephraums for his string of horses, and living quarters for families who looked after the animals.

After the country declared independence from Great Britain in 1948, Tamil laborers originally recruited by the British from India to work on tea plantations were declared stateless. Their applications for citizenship were too numerous to be processed at the Kachcheri, so the Government took over sixteen rooms in the bedroom wing as a second Kachcheri. When racing was abolished by the Government in 1956 the stables were converted them into twin cottages and leased. In the 1980s the tennis court became a rose garden and subsequently a car park.

In the early 1960s Mr and Mrs De Zilwa's adult children, migrated with their families to Australia. By the mid-1970s Mr and Mrs De Zilwa decided to follow and in 1976, sold the hotel to Gerald 'Gem' Milhuisen, a hotel owner and agent for Vingressor Tours, a Swedish tour company. During 1977–1978, St Andrews was upgraded with ensuite bathroom being provided in the original guest wing. In 1979 a new porch was added several metres below the original porch with a series of steps leading to the original entrance, in order to accommodate tourist coaches, that were previously unable to climb the gradient. In 1986 Milhuisen went into partnership with Herbert Cooray, also a hotel owner and Director of the Jetwing group of hotels. In 1987 Milhuisen sold his share and St Andrews was added to the Jetwing Hotels group. In the late 1980s several additions were constructed including a new kitchen, accommodation wing, executive and staff wings. In 1992 a further 24 new rooms were added to the hotel.
