= Jetwing Jaffna =

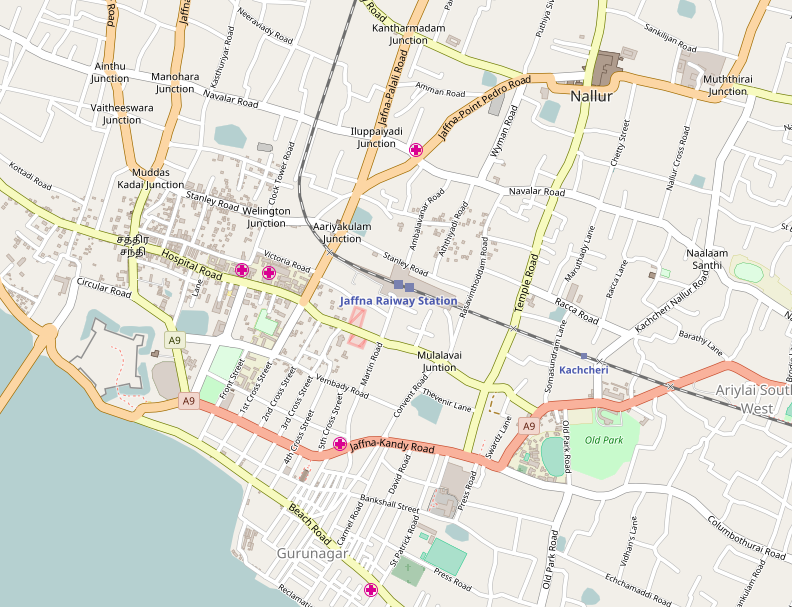
- Location within Central Jaffna
- Alternative names: Jetwing Yarl

General information
- Location: Mahatma Gandhi Road, Jaffna, Sri Lanka
- Coordinates: 9°39′53.70″N 80°0′49.10″E
- Construction started: February 2012
- Opened: April 2016
- Owner: Yarl Hotels (Private) Limited

Technical details
- Floor count: 7

Other information
- Number of rooms: 55

Website
- jetwinghotels.com

Jetwing Jaffna (Jetwing Yarl) is a hotel in the city of Jaffna in northern Sri Lanka. The seven-storey 55 room star class hotel is located in the heart of the city on Mahatma Gandhi Road (former Clock Tower Road), next to Cargills Square. The hotel was built on land purchased in 1975 by N. U. Jayawardena, former governor of the Central Bank of Ceylon. Originally intended to be a fourteen-storey 76 room hotel, construction began in February 2012. Owned by Yarl Hotels, a joint venture between Jetwing Hotels and MMBL Group (Mercantile Merchant Banking Limited), the Rs. 1 billion hotel opened in April 2016.
