= Hotel Suisse =

Hotel in Kandy, Sri Lanka

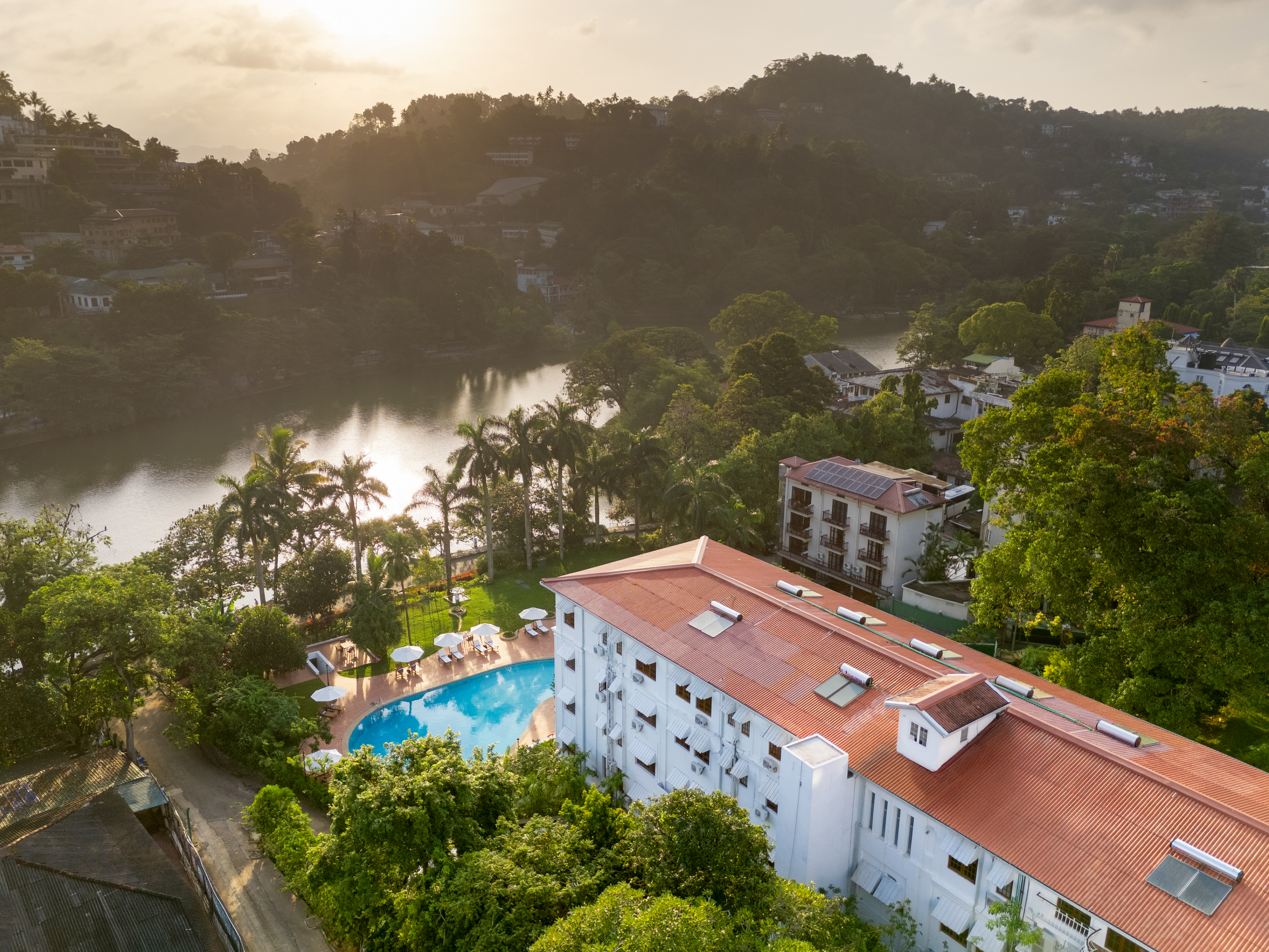
- Interactive map of the Hotel Suisse area
- Hotel chain: Ceylon Hotels

General information
- Classification: Heritage hotel
- Location: Kandy, Sri Lanka, 30 Sangaraja Mawatha, Kandy, Sri Lanka., Kandy, Sri Lanka
- Coordinates: 7°17′18.24″N 80°38′34.44″E
- Opening: 1890
- Owner: Kandy Hotels Company
- Operator: Ceylon Hotels Corporation

Technical details
- Floor count: 4

Other information
- Number of rooms: 88
- Number of suites: 8
- Number of restaurants: 1
- Number of bars: 1
- Facilities: Swimming pool, restaurant, bar, lounge, spa, sauna, garden, banquet hall, conference rooms, parking etc.
- Parking: on-site

Website
- http://www.hotelsuisse.lk/

The Hotel Suisse is a 4-star heritage hotel located in Kandy, Sri Lanka.

== History ==
The building was originally the residence of Pilimatala Gabada Nilame, the Chief Minister of the Royal Granary, and was built in the 17th century. It was located on Migon Aramba, 'the place where the King’s buffaloes grazed'. Following the Great Rebellion of 1817–18 the building was confiscated by the British in 1818, and given to a British officer, who renamed it Haramby (Aramba) House. In 1846 it became the residence of George Wall, the manager of the Ceylon Plantation Company. In the early 1880s the building was occupied by the Kandy Club. In 1887 the club moved to a building vacated by the Orient Bank, which had gone into liquidation, later became part of the Queen's Hotel. In 1924 the building was acquired by a Swiss lady, Jeanne Louisa Burdayron, who operated it as a guest house before it became a hotel. At one stage the building was also used as a maternity ward for planters' wives. During World War II (between April 1944 and 1945), it was used as the headquarters of the South East Asia Command, under the command of Lord Louis Mountbatten.

In 1951 the government took over the building for use as government offices.

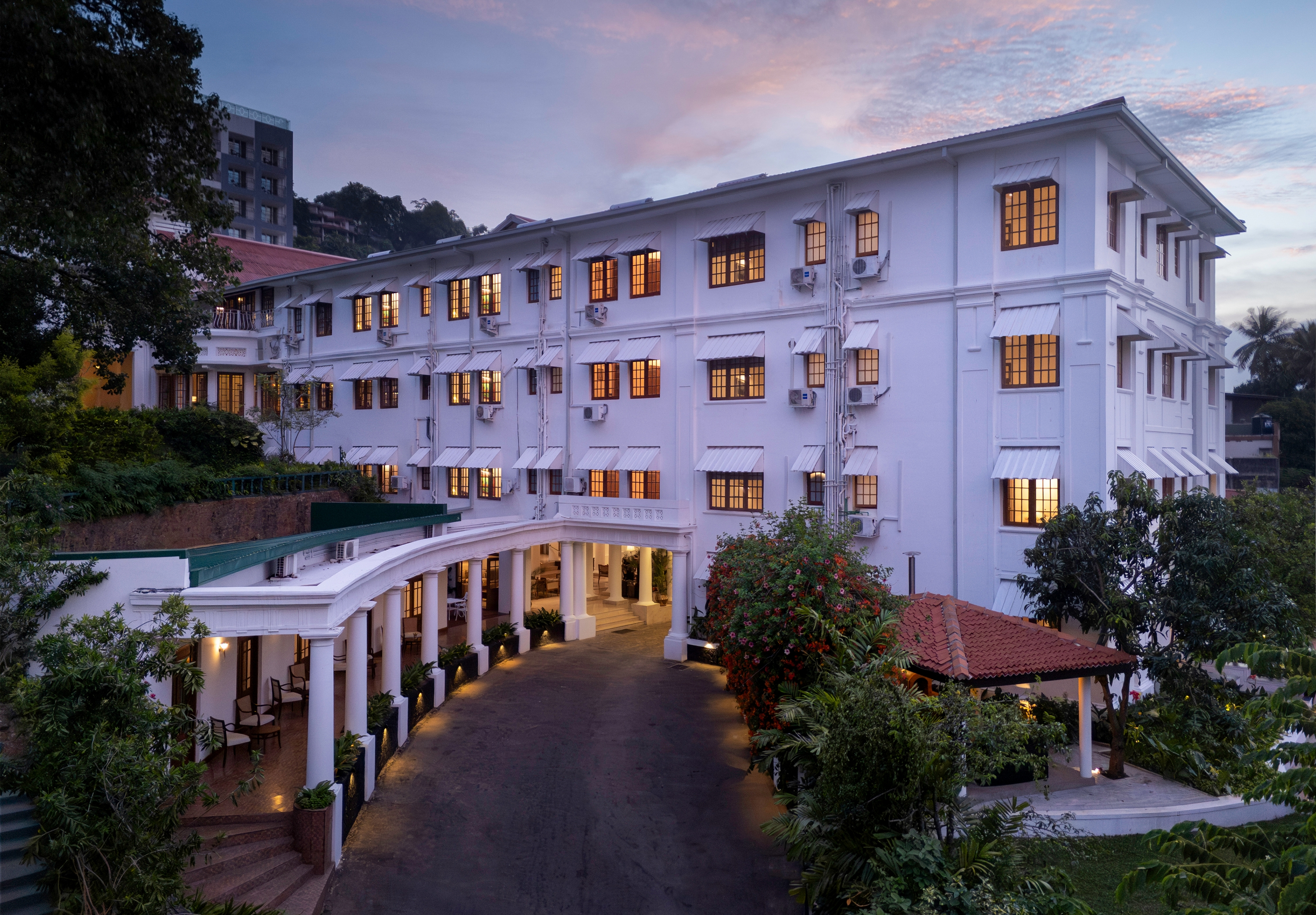

== Facilities ==
The hotel has 88 rooms, including eight suites, a lounge bar and restaurant. It also has an outdoor swimming pool, banquet/conference facilities, firewood pizzeria, sauna and spa.
