= Jetwing Hotels =

Sri Lankan hotel chain

Jetwing Hotels Limited
- Company type: Private
- Industry: Hospitality
- Founded: 1970; 56 years ago Negombo, Sri Lanka
- Founder: Herbert Cooray
- Headquarters: Colombo, Sri Lanka
- Number of locations: 30+ (2020)
- Area served: Sri Lanka
- Key people: Shiromal Cooray (Chairperson); Hiran Cooray (Executive Director); Ruan Samarasinghe (MD)
- Products: Hotels, resorts
- Parent: Jetwing Hotels Management Services (Private) Limited
- Website: jetwinghotels.com

Jetwing Hotels Limited is a Sri Lankan hotel chain. Jetwing was founded in the 1970s by Herbert Cooray when he purchased the Blue Oceanic Hotel in Negombo from its Swedish owner Vingressor and renamed it Jetwing. Cooray founded Jetwing Travels in 1981. Jetwing Hotels' current chairman, Hiran Cooray, is the son of Herbert Cooray. Jetwing Symphony acts as the holding company for the new hotel of the Jetwing Group.

== Properties ==
Jetwing Hotels operates several hotels and villas across Sri Lanka:

Hotels

- Jetwing Saman Villas, Bentota
- Jetwing Colombo Seven, Colombo
- Jetwing Lake, Dambulla
- Jetwing Lighthouse, Galle
- Jetwing Jaffna, Jaffna
- Mermaid Hotel & Club, Kalutara
- Jetwing Kandy Gallery, Kandy
- Jetwing Ayurveda Pavilions, Negombo
- Jetwing Beach, Negombo
- Jetwing Blue, Negombo
- Jetwing Sea, Negombo
- Jetwing Lagoon, Negombo
- Jetwing St. Andrew's, Nuwara Eliya
- Jie Jie Beach by Jetwing, Panadura
- Jetwing Surf, Pottuvil
- Jetwing Vil Uyana, Sigiriya
- Jetwing Kaduruketha, Wellawaya
- Jetwing Jungle Lodge, Yala
- Jetwing Yala, Yala
- Off Broadway Motel, Auckland, New Zealand

Villas

- Jetwing Galle Heritage Home, Galle
- Jetwing Mahesa Bhawan, Jaffna
- Jetwing Thalahena Villas, Negombo
- Jetwing Warwick Gardens, Nuwara Eliya
- Broomfield by Jetwing
- The Cottage by Jetwing, Nuwara Eliya
- Oatlands by Jetwing, Nuwara Eliya
- Meena Amma's Tea Experience, Nuwara Eliya
- Kottukal Beach House by Jetwing, Pottuvil
- Jetwing Uva Ben Head Villa, Welimada
- Jetwing Welimada Villa, Welimada
