= Elkaduwa =

Elkaduwa ඇල්කඩුව எல்கடுவ
- Village
- Location within Sri Lanka
- Coordinates: 7°25′1.1″N 80°41′0.5″E
- Country: Sri Lanka
- Province: Central Province
- District: Matale District
- Elevation: 2,500 ft (762 m)
- Time zone: UTC+5:30 (Sri Lanka Standard Time)

Elkaduwa (Sinhala: ඇල්කඩුව, Tamil: எல்கடுவ) is a village in Sri Lanka. It is located within Matale District, Central Province. There are two roads to reach Elkaduwa. One is from Ukuwela (Matale), and the other one is from Wattegama (Kandy).

== Local Government Council ==
Elkaduwa is governed by the Ukuwela Pradeshiya Sabha.

== Tourist attractions ==
- Sembuwatta
- Hunnas Falls

== See also ==
- List of towns in Central Province, Sri Lanka
