= Eco hotel =

Environmentally sustainable hotel

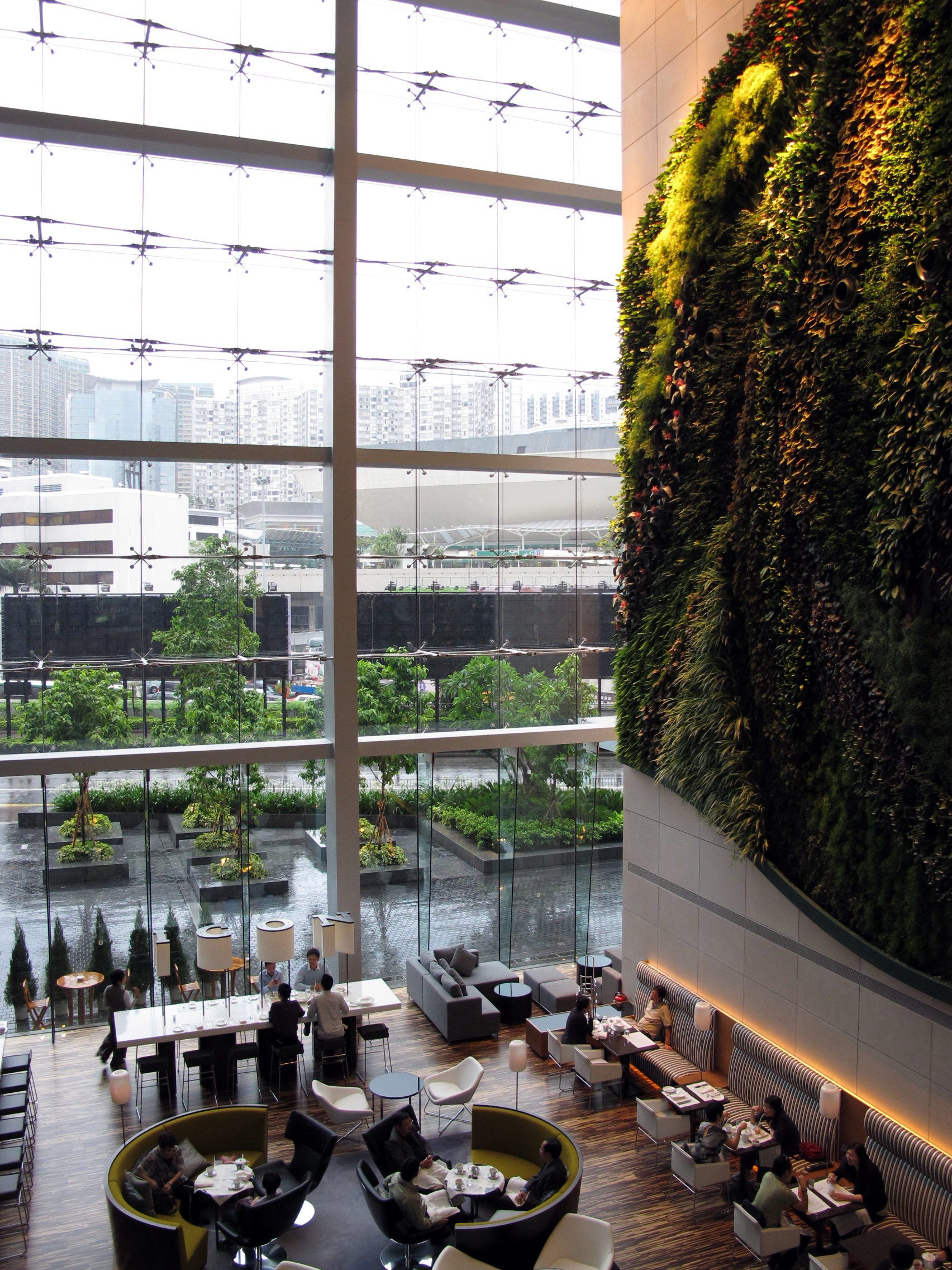
Hotel ICON in Kowloon, Hong Kong

An eco hotel, or a green hotel, is an environmentally sustainable hotel or accommodation that has made important environmental improvements to its structure in order to minimize its impact on the natural environment. The basic definition of an eco-friendly hotel is an environmentally responsible lodging that follows the practices of green living. These hotels have to be certified green by an independent third-party or by the state they are located in. Traditionally, these hotels were mostly presented as ecolodges because of their location, often in jungles, and their design inspired by the use of traditional building methods applied by local craftsmen in countries such as Costa Rica and Indonesia.

These improvements can include non-toxic housekeeping practices, the use of renewable energy, organic soaps, energy-efficient light fixtures, serving local organic food, reusing linens when a guest is staying for more than one night, and incorporating in-room recycling and composting programs. Hotels that have these certifications and best practices can attract environmentally conscious travelers and stand out from other hotels.

== Criteria ==
An eco hotel must usually meet the following criteria:

- Dependence on the natural environment
- Ecological sustainability
- Proven contribution to conservation
- Provision of environmental training programs
- Incorporation of cultural considerations
- Provision of an economic return to the community

== Characteristics ==
Green hotels follow strict environmental guidelines to ensure that guests stay in safe, non-toxic, and energy-efficient accommodation. Here are some basic characteristics of a green hotel:

- Housekeeping uses non-toxic cleaning agents and laundry detergent
- 100% organic cotton sheets, towels, and mattresses
- Non-smoking environment
- Renewable energy sources, such as solar or wind energy
- Bulk organic soap and amenities instead of individual packages to reduce waste
- Guest room and hotel lobby recycling bins
- Towel and sheet reuse (guests can ask housekeeping to leave these slightly used items to reduce water consumption)
- Energy-efficient lighting
- On-site transportation with green vehicles
- Serves organic and locally grown food
- Non-disposable dishes
- Offers a fresh-air exchange system
- Greywater recycling, which is the reuse of kitchen, bath, and laundry water for gardening and landscaping
- Newspaper recycling program
- Biodegradable or FSC-certified wooden room key cards instead of traditional PVC plastic key cards

== Definition ==
An ecological hotel is one that is fully integrated into the environment without damaging the environment, contributing in some way to progress and improvement of the local community and sustainable growth of the tourism industry.

The term has been used on a more regular basis as new websites devoted to the subject become more prominent and hotel owners become more interested in protecting the areas their guests have come to visit.

New properties are being built from sustainable resources—tropical hardwoods, local stone–and designed to better blend in with their environment. They are also being run on eco-friendly principles, such as serving organic or locally grown food or using natural cooling as opposed to air conditioning.

Ecolabels are labeling systems that show the environmental impact of goods and services within regions around the world.

=== Ecolabeling of hotels in Europe ===
The EU Ecolabel is an official sign of the environmental quality of services and goods established in 1992 in the European Union (EU) that is both certified by an independent organization and valid throughout the many member states of the European Union.

Any tourism accommodation operator in the EU – from a large hotel chain to a small farmhouse – has been able to apply for the European Eco-label since 2003. The operators must meet strict minimum standards with regard to environmental performance and health standards. Tourism accommodation services need to meet certain set criteria by acquiring a minimum of 20 points of a range of mandatory requirements. These mandatory requirements include the use of renewable energy sources, an overall reduction in energy and water consumption, measures to reduce waste and wastewater, environmental policy setting, the provision of non-smoking areas, and the promotion of environmentally preferable means of transport.

The first eco-labelled hotel in the European Union was the Sunwing Resort Kallithea, located in Rhodes, Greece, in September 2003.

=== Ecolabeling of hotels in South America ===
In Argentina, the Tourism Hotels Association (AHT) has created an annual award, Hoteles Más Verdes (”greenest hotels”). The prize – a monetary award and peer-recognition – goes the best eco-hotels in the country, both operating and under construction.

In 2014, the city of Buenos Aires has presented a new labeling system for hotels and hostels, Ecosello. With three levels of certification (Committed, Advanced, and Excellence), the new label aims at developing eco-consciousness among tourism operators in Buenos Aires.

=== Ecolabeling of hotels globally ===
In 2008, the Global Sustainable Tourism Council Criteria was launched at the IUCN World Conservation Congress. The Criteria, managed by the Global Sustainable Tourism Council, created a global standard for sustainable travel and tourism and includes criteria and performance indicators for destinations, tour operators and hotels. The GSTC provides accreditation through a third-party to Certification Bodies to legitimize claims of sustainability.

== Additional initiatives ==
Eco hotels may also actively help in protecting its natural environment. For instance, the Misool Eco Resort was started as a funding vehicle for conservation work in the area. A private marine reserve (which has grown to a size of 300 000 acres) was set up, and included a no-take zone. A salaried 15-person team of local rangers (which work for the sister charity, Misool Foundation) patrol the area and have a base camp at Misool Eco Resort (alongside additional locations in the area). The Misool Foundation also has additional projects, including a collaborative program to end manta hunting in Lakamera (Savu Sea Alliance). For the livelihood of the eco resort itself, the conservation work is also of great importance, as it leverages pristine reefs as its central asset (the resort includes a dive center). The work has even increased this asset as an increase of 250% of biomass was observed over a 6-year period.

Besides simply protecting the environment, eco hotels can also help the environment by coral growing initiatives (coral nursery). Iberostar Group's Wave of Change initiative focuses on exactly that.

== See also ==
- Ecotourism
