= Cinnamon Bentota Beach =

- Logo of Cinnamon Bentota Beach
- Hotel chain: Cinnamon Hotels & Resorts

General information
- Architectural style: Tropical modernism
- Location: Bentota, Sri Lanka
- Coordinates: 6°25′29.0″N 79°59′49.0″E
- Opened: 1967
- Owner: John Keells Hotels

Design and construction
- Architect: Geoffrey Bawa

Other information
- Number of rooms: 159
- Number of suites: 16
- Number of restaurants: 6

Website
- www.cinnamonhotels.com/cinnamonbentotabeach

Cinnamon Bentota Beach, formerly known as Bentota Beach Hotel, is a luxury five-star hotel in Bentota, Sri Lanka. The hotel was built in 1967 and designed by Geoffrey Bawa. After refurbishment, the hotel reopened in 2019. The hotel is owned and operated by a subsidiary of John Keells Holdings under its luxury hotel chain, Cinnamon Hotels & Resorts. Cinnamon Bentota Beach is known for its architecture and decor.

== Architecture ==
The Sri Lankan architect Geoffrey Bawa designed the Bentota Beach Hotel which was built between 1967 and 1969. Bawa's architectural approach is described as "tropical modernism". It is the first resort hotel in Sri Lanka and was built on the site where the old rest house stood. With the construction of the hotel, Bentota was designated as the first "national holiday resort". Laki Senanayake worked on the peacock culture of the hotel and Ismeth Raheem painted 14 black and white panels.

== History ==
Ceylon Holiday Resorts Ltd. is the owner and operator of the hotel and is a subsidiary of John Keells Hotels PLC which in turn is a subsidiary of John Keells Holdings. John Keells Holdings acquired Whittalls Group of Companies in 1991 giving them control of Ceylon Holiday Resorts. Ceylon Holiday Resorts was formerly listed on the Colombo Stock Exchange under the symbol of "CHR". During the 2012 ICC Women's World Twenty20, the South Africa women's national cricket team stayed at the hotel with their families.

In 2017, 50 years after the inauguration of Bentota Beach Hotel was closed for reconstruction. In reconstruction, under the supervision of Channa Daswatte, the iconic ceiling by Ena de Silva at the entrance of the hotel will be remade. The handloom fabrics used in the remake were designed by Barbara Sansoni and BareFoot. After an LKR4.9 billion refurbishment, the hotel reopened in December 2019. Prior to the refurbishment, the hotel was rated as a four-star and had 133 rooms.

== Amenities ==
The hotel is equipped with 159 rooms and six specialised restaurants. These include Nossa, which is an all-day dining restaurant, a seafood restaurant Sea Meats Spice, Zest, an Asian restaurant and Ottimo which serves pizzas and pasta.

== See also ==
- List of hotels in Sri Lanka
