= Bevis Bawa =

Sri Lankan landscape architect

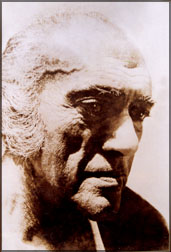
- Born: 26 April 1909; Colombo, Sri Lanka
- Died: 18 September 1992 (aged 83); Bentota, Sri Lanka
- Education: Royal College, Colombo
- Military career
- Allegiance: Ceylon
- Branch: Ceylon Defence Force
- Service years: 1929 - 1950
- Rank: Major
- Unit: Ceylon Light Infantry
- Commands: Aide-de-camp to the Governor of Ceylon
- Conflicts: World War II
- Awards: War Medal 1939–1945
- Other work: Landscaper, horticulturalist

Major Bevis William Frederick Bawa, ADC, CLI (26 April 1909 – 18 September 1992) was a Ceylonese (Sri Lankan) planter, soldier and a landscaper. He was also one of the most renowned landscape architects in Sri Lanka and served as the Aide-de-camp to four Governors of Ceylon.

== Early life and education ==
Bevis Bawa was born on 26 April 1909 in Colombo, the eldest son of Captain Benjamin William Bawa (1865–1923), a wealthy and successful lawyer, of Muslim and European parentage, and Bertha Marianne née Schrader (1876–1946), who was of mixed German, Scottish and Sinhalese descent. He had one younger brother, Geoffrey Bawa (1919–2003) ten years his junior, who is regarded as being one of the most important and influential Asian architects of the twentieth century.

Bawa was educated at Royal College Colombo, but had to leave school at seventeen when his father died while in England. His mother sent him to be trained as a planter at his uncle's estates in order to take up the management of the family estate in Aluthgama known as Brief Estate.

== Military career ==
In 1929, Bawa was commissioned as a Second Lieutenant in the Ceylon Light Infantry, a reservist regiment of the Ceylon Defence Force. In 1934, Lieutenant Bawa was appointed as Aide-de-camp (ADC) to the Governor, Sir Reginald Edward Stubbs; a post held by his father years before. He served sixteen years at the King's House in the staff of the Governor and thereafter the Governor General as the ADC to Sir Andrew Caldecott, Sir Henry Monck-Mason Moore and Lord Soulbury, gaining promotion to the rank of Captain and thereafter Major. He was one of the initial officers of the newly formed Ceylon Army and one of only nine Majors in the army at the time. He retired from the army in 1950, with Captain (later General) Sepala Attygalle succeeding him to the post of ADC to the Governor General.

== Landscaping ==
Having started running the 2 ha (4.9 acres) family rubber plantation known as the Brief Estate in 1929, he began making a garden and developing the estate bungalow while serving in the Army. In 1949 he inherited the estate, which had originally been acquired by his father, from his mother. After he retired from the Army, be made Brief his home and extended its gardens. As the popularity of Brief Gardens grew, he was commissioned to landscape many Embassies, public buildings and private houses in Colombo.

Bevis offered sanctuary to a number of Sri Lankan artists including Laki Senanayake, Ena de Silva, the dancers Chitrasena and Vajira Chitrasena and designer Barbara Sansoni. He also played host to a number of international visitors including Laurence Olivier, Vivien Leigh, the Duke of Windsor, Agatha Christie and Australian artist Donald Friend (who originally planned to stay for a week and ended up staying for six years). He also dabbled in art and sculpture. Bawa continued to develop the property until his death aged 83 on 18 September 1992. He left his estate to his workers and Brief Garden went to his manager Dooland de Silva who himself is a leading Landscape Designer in Sri Lanka. Brief Garden has been is a popular tourist destination since it was open to the public in 1969.

== Personal life ==
Bawa was intelligent, well-connected and an acute social observer with a flair for art. He was openly homosexual. This is reflected in his estate which contains a number of homoerotic figures and artworks.

== Notable works ==
- Brief garden
