= Laki Senanayake =

Sri Lankan sculptor and painter (1937–2021)

- ලකී සේනානායක
- Born: 18 December 1937; British Ceylon
- Died: 30 May 2021 (aged 83); Diyabubula, Dambulla
- Education: Royal College Colombo
- Occupation: Painter
- Spouse: Ranjini Perera (m 1962)
- Parents: Reginald S. Vincent (father); Florence Senanayake (mother)

Laki Senanayake (18 December 1937 - 30 May 2021) was a Sri Lankan sculptor and painter. He was known for his metal sculptures, often of birds. He worked closely with architect Geoffrey Bawa, working for and subsequently being commissioned by Bawa for several projects.

== Personal life ==
Born in 1937, the son of Reginald S. Vincent and Florence Senanayake, he was the fifth of six children. His father, a planter by profession, was a Marxist and a founding member of the Lanka Sama Samaja Party (LSSP), serving as its treasurer from 1935 to 1939. During World War II, his father went into hiding and was later arrested and detained by the British colonial administration due to the anti-war position espoused by the LSSP. Released after the war, Senanayake's father died in 1946. His mother took on her husband's political activities and was elected as the first female member of parliament in 1947.

Senanayake grew up in rural countryside due to the war and political activities of his parents. He received his secondary education at Royal College, Colombo, where he won the annual art competition.

He married Ranjini Perera in 1962. They had a daughter, Mintaka before they separated, and Ranjini migrated to the United States. Senanayake died on 30 May 2021 on his estate, Diyabubula, in Dambulla, at the age of 84.

== Career ==
Following his schooling, Senanayake found work as an assistant in an architect's office, however he was soon sacked for organising his co-workers to form a trade union. He was then employed by Geoffrey Bawa as a draughtsman, having noticed his talents. He soon developed close relationship with artists such as Bevis Bawa, Donald Friend, Ulrik Plesner, Barbara Sansoni and Ena de Silva who had a close relationship with Bawa. By the 1970s Senanayake had established himself as an independent artist.

== Notable works ==
- Ceylon Pavilion, 1970 World Expo, Osaka, Japan - bronze Bodhi-leaf (1970)
- Ceylonese currency - bank note design - endemic flora and fauna (1979)
- Indo-Suez Bank, Colombo - ceiling drawings (1979)
- Triton Hotel, Ahungalla - brass and plaster reliefs (1981)
- Parliament building, Sri Jayawardenapura Kotte - sculptural chandelier (main chamber) (1982)
- Neptune Hotel, Bentota - brass palm and plaster reliefs
- Sinbad Hotel, Kalutara - transparent cosmological sphere (1990)
- Kandalama Hotel, Dambulla - brass owl sculpture (1994)
- Bentota Beach Hotel, Bentota - brass peacock sculpture
- Lighthouse Hotel - bronze and copper sculptural balustrading (1998)
- C Beyond Hotel, Nilaveli - building design and sculptures
- Diyabubula, Dambulla - building design and sculptures

== Publications ==
- Lewcock, Ronald; Sansoni, Barbara; Senanayake, Laki (2010). The Architecture of an Island - The Living Heritage of Sri Lanka. Barefoot. ISBN 978-9559466000.
