= Brief (garden) =

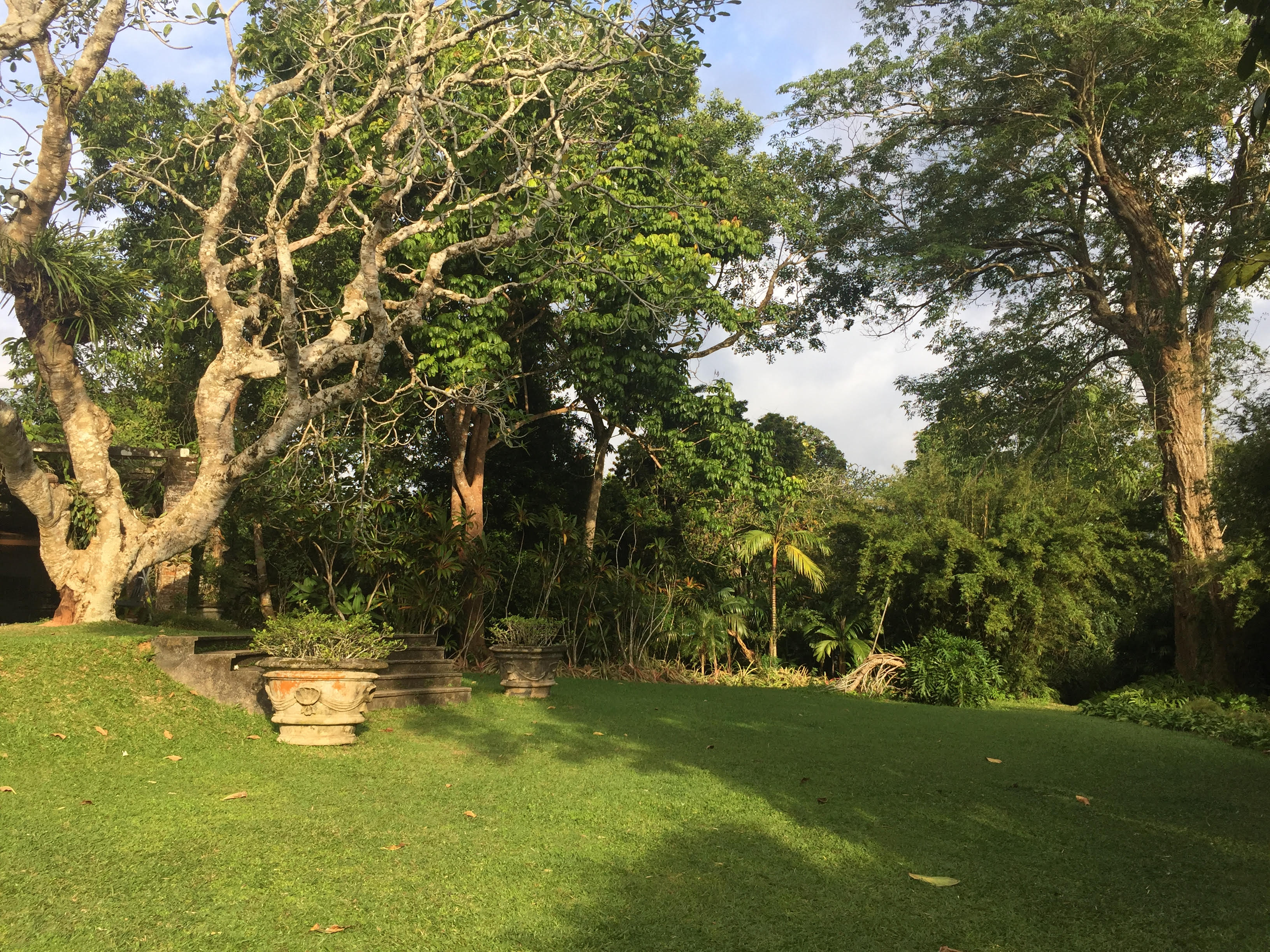

- Location within Sri Lanka
- Interactive map of Brief
- Type: Garden
- Location: Beruwala, Kalutara District, Western Province, Sri Lanka
- Coordinates: 6°27′26″N 80°02′15″E
- Area: 2 hectares (5 acres)
- Created: 1929; 97 years ago

Brief Garden is a landscape garden and former home in Beruwala, Sri Lanka designed by landscape architect and owner Bevis Bawa. It is home to the landscape design practice, Brief Garden Designs.

In 1929 Bawa was bequeathed the family rubber plantation by his mother, Bertha Marianne née Schrader (1876–1946). The estate's unique name was derived from the fact that it was purchased by his father, Benjamin, with funds from a successful legal brief. Bawa realised that he lacked the self-discipline to operate and maintain a successful plantation and focused instead on developing the estate's garden. The original estate was approximately 81 hectares (200 acres) with Bawa selling off portions of the estate to reduce it to manageable proportions. He continually worked on the garden until his death in 1992. The estate was inherited by his employees, with Dooland de Silva, currently managing the property.

== Description ==
The entrance to the garden is located through ornate gateposts, crowned with male and female figures. The gateposts were created by Bawa and Donald Friend, an Australian artist, and represent a fusion of Eastern and Western influences. The path then leads to two additional entrances. The first, a black and white door set in a mustard yellow wall, leads to the house via a curved staircase. The second, a wrought iron gate, leads down into the garden but screens any views of the house.

== See also ==
- Lunuganga
