= Lunuganga =

- ලුණුගඟ (Sinhala) லுணுகங்கை (Tamil)
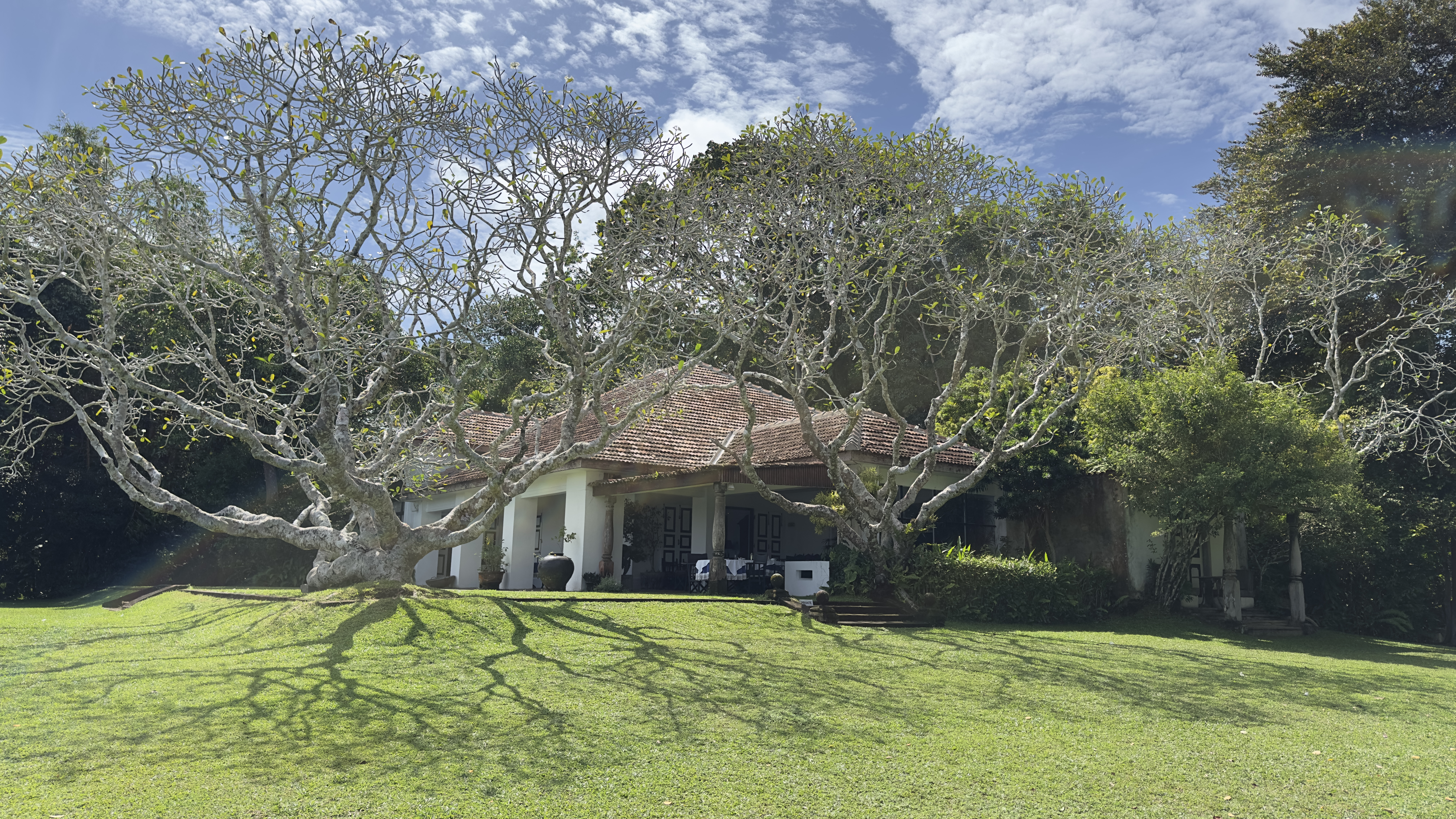
- The Estate's Main Bungalow
- Interactive map of the Lunuganga area
- Hotel chain: Teardrop Hotels

General information
- Type: Country Home/Hotel
- Location: Dedduwa, Bentota 80500, Bentota, Sri Lanka
- Coordinates: 6°24′12″N 80°1′18″E
- Year built: 1948 -1998
- Owner: Geoffrey Bawa Trust

Technical details
- Size: 25 Acres

Design and construction
- Architect: Geoffrey Bawa

Other information
- Number of rooms: 7
- Number of restaurants: 1

Website
- geoffreybawa.com/lunuganga

The Lunuganga Estate is the former country house of renowned Sri Lankan architect Geoffrey Bawa.

== History ==
The estate had been used as a cinnamon estate during the Dutch era and then a rubber plantation under the British. In 1948, the small house in the estate was given on rent to the local tax collector. In 1949, newly qualified lawyer Geoffrey Bawa bought it from its owner, intending to convert the estate bungalow into a weekend house and create a tropical version of a European renaissance garden. The 25 acres (10 ha) property is located on the banks of the Dedduwa Lake in Bentota. Bawa named the estate Lunuganga, which in Sinhala means Salt River. Recognising his lack of architectural knowledge, Bawa returned to England to study architecture. After qualifying as an architect, he returned to Ceylon in 1958 and joined the architectural practice of Edwards, Reid and Beggs.

Bawa continued to develop the house and gardens at Lunuganga for forty years until his death in May 2003. He was cremated on Cinnamon Hill and his ashes were buried there.

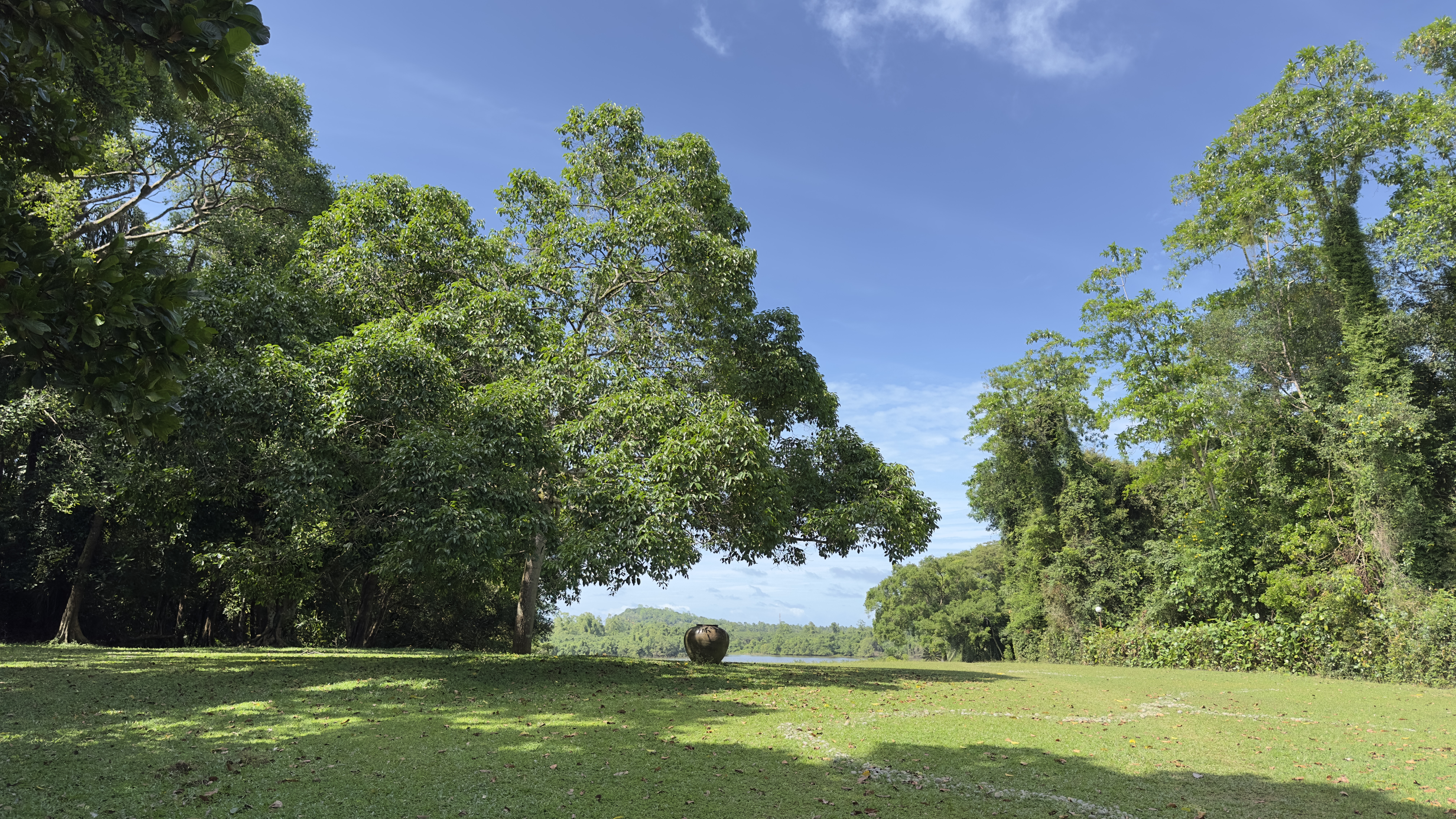
Cinnamon Hill, Bawa's final resting place

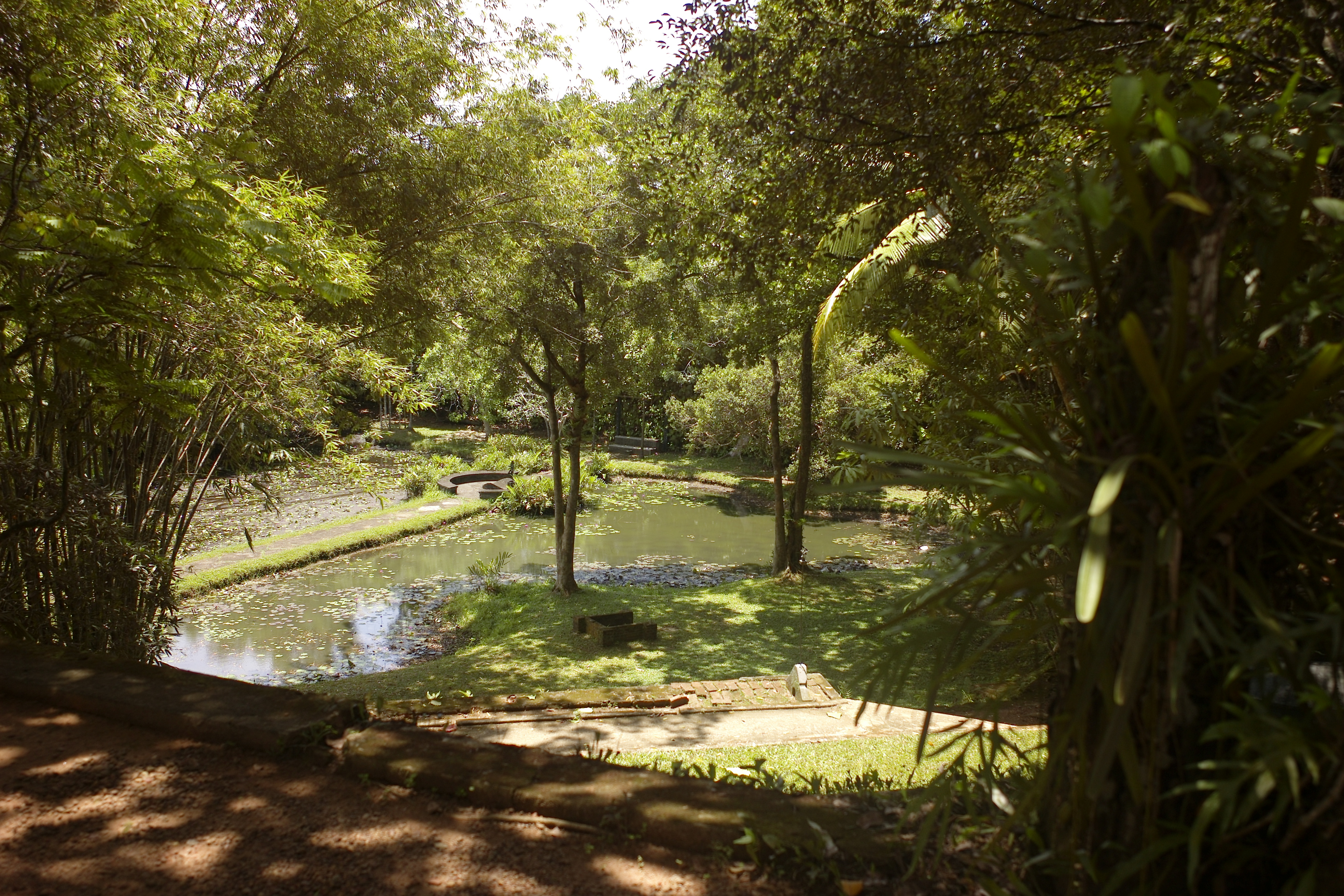
A view overlooking the Butterfly Pond on the estate

The house and gardens contain many works from artists such as Donald Friend and Laki Senanayake as well as artefacts from Asia and Europe.

Since Bawa's death in 2003, Lunuganga has been managed by a group of his close friends, who formed the Lunuganga Trust. The gardens are now open to the public and the buildings on the estate are run as a seasonal country house hotel by Teardrop Hotels.

== See also ==
- Heritance Kandalama
- Jetwing Lighthouse
- Sri Lankan Parliament Building
