= BJT (disambiguation) =

A bipolar junction transistor is a type of transistor that uses both electrons and holes as charge carriers.

BJT may also refer to:

- Balanta language (ISO 639: bjt), an Atlantic-Congo language of West Africa
- Beijing Time, another name for China Standard Time
- Bentota River Airport (IATA: BJT), Sri Lanka
- Bhumjaithai Party, a Thai political party
- Business Japanese Proficiency Test, a test of practical communicative ability in Japanese
