= Jetwing Lighthouse =

Hotel in Galle, Sri Lanka

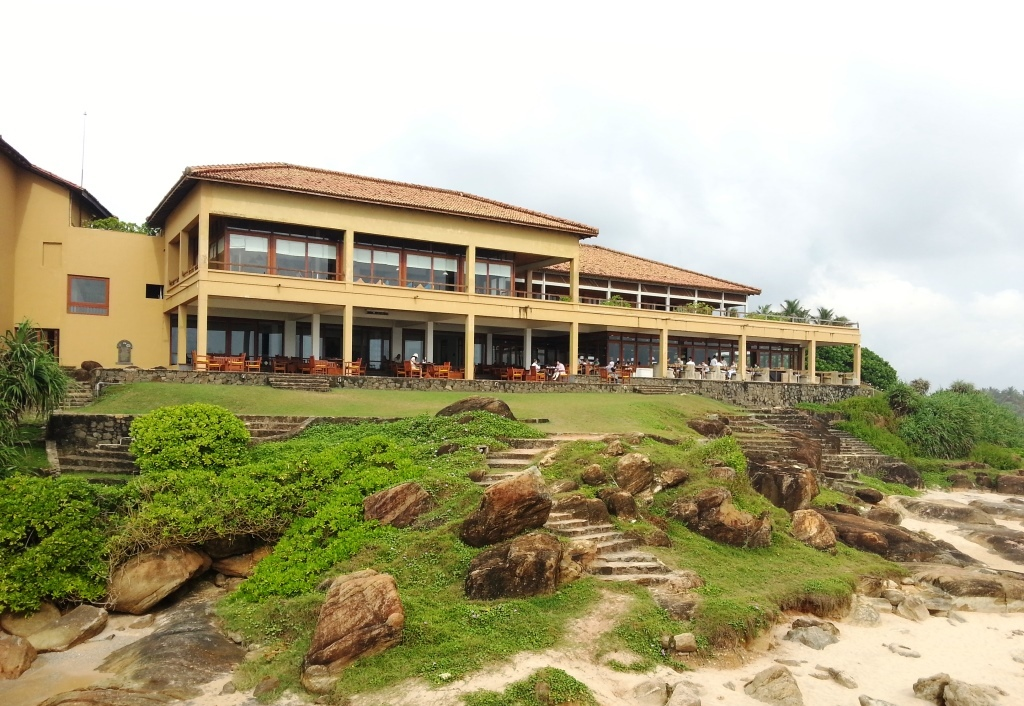

- Location within Sri Lanka
- Former names: Lighthouse Hotel

General information
- Location: Galle, Sri Lanka
- Coordinates: 6°2′31.92″N 80°11′41.28″E
- Opening: 7 June 1997
- Owner: Lighthouse Hotel PLC
- Operator: Jetwing Hotels

Technical details
- Floor count: 3

Design and construction
- Architect: Geoffrey Bawa

Other information
- Number of rooms: 85
- Number of suites: 5

Website
- Official site

Jetwing Lighthouse or Lighthouse Hotel, is a five-star franchise hotel, operated by Jetwing Hotels, located in Galle, Sri Lanka. It is just north of the Galle Fort on the Indian Ocean coastline.

== Geography ==
The hotel is situated in Galle, the capital of the Southern Province of Sri Lanka and is located on a rocky promontory 1.61 km (1.00 mi) to the north of Galle Harbour, on a site once occupied by a Circuit Magistrates' bungalow.

== History ==
The hotel was commissioned by Herbert Cooray in 1995 for his travel company Jetwings and designed by Geoffrey Bawa. The Lighthouse Hotel, as it was originally known, opened on 7 June 1997. The hotel initially had 60 rooms and three suites, two restaurants, a swimming pool and recreational facilities.

== Architecture ==
The Lighthouse hotel was one of Geoffrey Bawa's last major projects. The post-modern minimalist hotel reflects the 17th-century Dutch fort at Galle, in that it looks down on the ocean from atop a rocky promontory. A semi-circular drive leads visitors to a traditional stone façade. A small portal opens to an enclosed entry plaza, which features a spiral staircase, with intricate bronze and copper sculptured balustrading, topped by a blue-tiled Moorish dome. The sculptured balustrading, depicting the 'Battle of Randeniwela' between the Sinhalese and the Portuguese, was designed and constructed by Ceylonese architect/artist Laki Senanayake. The main lobby is a lowly lit space that accented by sunlight pooling on the polished concrete floor. The room almost appears to reach the vast blue Indian Ocean beyond. The rest of the property unfolds through a series of immaculately sculpted pools, courtyards, and stairs – which almost seem to be part of the natural landscape. Bawa made a number of the natural boulders the focus of the hotel, framing views of them from the air-conditioned dining room and the open-air lounge. The rooms feature teak floors, hand-carved furniture and original paintings, by Barbara Sansoni and Ena de Silva.

In 2013 the hotel was expanded with the addition of a new wing, adding an additional twenty rooms and two suites, together with a new restaurant.

== Facilities ==
The hotel currently has 85 rooms, three restaurants, two outdoor pools, and a spa.
