= Geoffrey Bawa =

Sri Lankan architect (1919–2003)

Deshamanya Geoffrey Bawa FRIBA
- Born: Geoffrey Manning Bawa; 23 July 1919; Colombo, British Ceylon
- Died: 27 May 2003 (aged 83); Colombo, Sri Lanka
- Education: Royal College, Colombo; St Catharine's College, Cambridge; Architectural Association School of Architecture
- Occupation: Architect
- Awards: Aga Khan Chairman's Award
- Practice: Edwards, Reid and Begg; Geoffrey Bawa Associates
- Buildings: Sri Lankan Parliament Building; University of Ruhuna; Heritance Kandalama

Geoffrey Manning Bawa (23 July 1919 – 27 May 2003) was a Sri Lankan architect. Often referred to as the leader of the Tropical Modernist movement, he was among the most influential Asian architects of his generation.

== Early life ==
Geoffrey Bawa was born in Colombo on 23 July 1919, the younger of the two sons of Major Benjamin Bawa, a Sri Lankan lawyer who was partly of European parentage, and Bertha Marianne née Schrader, a Burgher of mixed Sinhalese, German and Scottish descent. His older brother, Bevis, became a landscape architect.

== Education ==
Bawa was educated at Royal College, Colombo after which he studied English and Law in 1938 at St Catharine's College, Cambridge, gaining a BA (English Literature Tripos) and went on to study law at Middle Temple, London, becoming a barrister in 1944.

Returning to Ceylon after World War II, he worked for a Colombo law firm. After the death of his mother, he left the profession and soon left in 1946 to travel for two years, going to the Far East, across the United States, and finally to Europe and almost settling in Italy. By the time he was 28 years old, he had spent a third of his life away from Sri Lanka. During his time in Italy, he planned to buy a villa and settle down, but that did not happen, and by 1948 he had returned to Sri Lanka.

Bawa bought an abandoned rubber estate on the south-west coast of the island between Colombo and Galle at Lunuganga, planning to create an Italian garden from a tropical wilderness. However, he soon found that his ideas were compromised by his lack of technical knowledge. In 1951, he was apprenticed to H. H. Reid, the sole surviving partner of the Colombo architectural practice Edwards, Reid and Begg.

In 1952 Reid died, but Bawa still aspired to a career in architecture, so he returned to England. After spending a year at Cambridge, he enrolled as a student at the Architectural Association in London, where he earned a Diploma in Architecture by 1956 and in the following year he became an Associate of the Royal Institute of British Architects. In 1957, at the age of 38 he returned to Sri Lanka as a qualified architect to take over what was left of Reid's practice.

== Career in architecture ==
Returning to Ceylon, he became a partner of Messrs. Edwards, Reid and Begg, Colombo in 1958. In 1959, Danish architect Ulrik Plesner joined the firm, and the two designed many buildings together.

Bawa was influenced by colonial and traditional Ceylonese architecture, and the role of water in it, but rejected both the idea of regionalism and the imposition of preconceived forms onto a site.

Plesner left the island in 1967. Bawa became an Associate of the Sri Lanka Institute of Architects in 1960. An ensuing close association with a coterie of like-minded artists and designers, including Ena de Silva, Barbara Sansoni and Laki Senanayake, produced a new awareness of indigenous materials and crafts, leading to a post-colonial renaissance of culture. In 1979, President J. R. Jayewardene invited Bawa to design Sri Lanka's new Parliament building at Kotte. The project was completed in 1982 with the help of a firm of Japanese contractors, Mitsui.

== Personal life ==
Like his brother Bevis, Geoffrey was homosexual: both maintained a wide circle of friendships with other gay artists working across Sri Lanka and Oceania, including David Paynter, Lionel Wendt, and Donald Friend.

== Later life and death ==
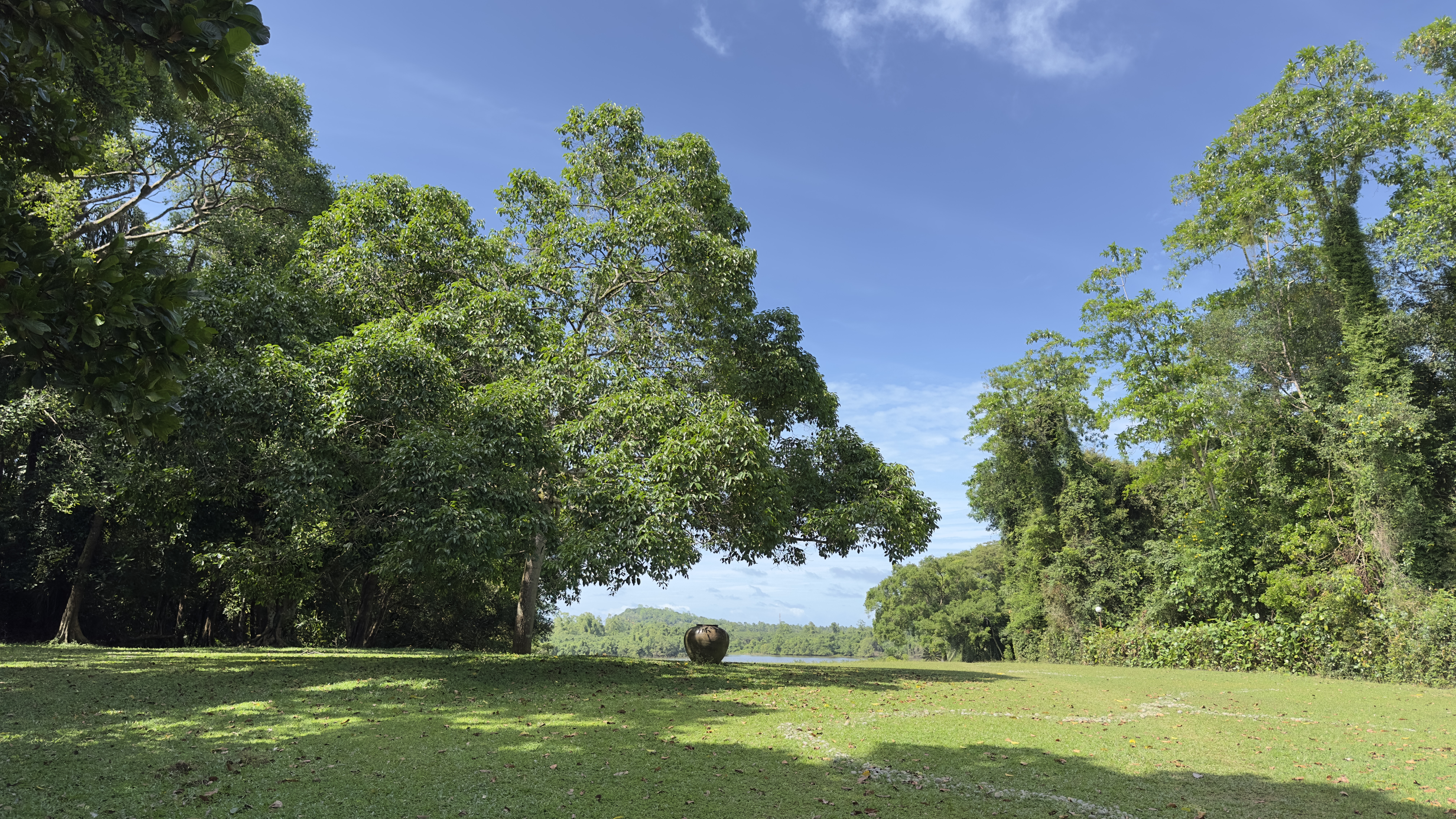
Bawa's final resting place on Cinnamon Hill at Lunuganga, his country estate

In 1982, Bawa established the Geoffrey Bawa Trust with the aim of furthering the fields of architecture, fine arts and environmental studies. In the early 1990s, Bawa suffered a series of strokes that left him ill.

Bawa died on 27 May 2003 at the age of 83.

== Influence ==
Geoffrey Bawa influenced a generation of architects in Sri Lanka after him, but his legacy was also embraced in Asia and around the world. Several of Bawa's projects also supplied models for new building types in Sri Lanka. At the Ena de Silva House, rooms were arranged around an inward-looking central courtyard, offering an alternative to the colonial bungalow. The Bentota Beach Hotel combined modern accommodation with forms and materials associated with its setting and influenced later resort development in the country. At the University of Ruhuna, pavilions, loggias, courtyards and terraces were distributed across two rocky hills, closely joining the campus to its landscape.

== List of works ==
Bawa's work was mainly in Sri Lanka, but included several other countries as well: nine times in India, three times in Indonesia, twice in Mauritius and once in Fiji, and Singapore. His works include houses, hotels, schools, clubs, offices and government buildings, most notably the Sri Lankan Parliament Building. Today, the Gallery Café on Paradise Road in Colombo is located in Bawa's former office building.

A List of the works of Geoffrey Bawa
Work	Location	Years worked on	Notes	Image
1940s
Lunuganga	Bentota	1948–1998	Bawa's country estate	
1950s
S. Thomas' Preparatory School	Colombo	1957–1964		
Carmen Gunasekera House	Colombo	1958		
Kanangara House	Colombo	1959		
Club House	Ratnapura	1959		
Deraniyagala House	Colombo	1959		
Wimal Fernando House	Colombo	1959		
Jayawardena House	Colombo	1959–1960		
Ekala Industrial Estate	Ja Ela	1959–1960		
A. S. H. De Silva House	Galle	1959–1960		
Manager's Bungalow	Maskeliya	1959–1960		
Turin Koralage House	Elpitiya	1959–1960		
Wijewardene House	Colombo	1959–1964		
1960s
Osmund and Ena De Silva House	Colombo	1960–1962		
Bishop's College	Colombo	1960–1963		
33rd Lane	Colombo	1960–1998	Bawa's Colombo residence	
Nazareth Chapel, Good Shepherd Convent	Bandarawela	1961–1962		
House for Dr. Bartholomeusz	Colombo	1961–1963		
House for Chris and Carmel Raffel	Colombo	1962–1964		
Pim and Pam Fernando House	Colombo	1963		
St. Bridget's Convent Montessori School	Colombo	1963–1964		
Polontalawa Estate Bungalow	Polontalawa	1963–1965		
Hilton Colombo	Colombo	1965		
Madurai Boys' Town	Madurai, India	1965–1967		
Yahapath Endera Farm School	Hanwella	1965–1971		
Coral Garden Hotel	Hikkaduwa	1966	Additions and renovations	
Grand Oriental Hotel	Colombo	1966	Additions and renovations; Formerly known as the Taprobane Hotel	
Steel Corporation Offices	Oruwala	1966–1969		
Bentota Beach Hotel	Bentota	1967–1969		
Pieter Keuneman House	Colombo	1967–1969		
Serendib Hotel	Bentota	1967–1970		
Yala Beach Hotel	yala, sri lanka	1968		
Mahahalpe Farm	Kandy	1969		
Ceylon Pavilion at the 1970 World's Fair	Osaka, Japan	1969–1970		
1970s
The Villa Bentota by KK Collection	Bentota	1970–1971		
Pallakele Industrial Estate	Pallekele	1970–1971		
P.C. de Saram Terrace Houses	Colombo	1970–1973		
Science Block	Nugegoda	1971		
Madurai Club	Madurai, India	1971–1974	Has been renamed as Heritage Madurai.	
Hotel Connemara	Chennai, India	1971–1976	Remodelled by Bawa, it's now known as the Taj Connemara	
Club Mediterranee	Nilaveli	1972		
Stanley de Saram House	Colombo	1972		
Batujimbar Pavilions	Sanur, Indonesia	1972–1975		
Peter White House	Pereybere, Mauritius	1973–1974		
Heritance Ayurveda Maha Gedara	Beruwela	1973–1976	Formerly the Neptune Hotel	
Agrarian Research and Training Institute	Colombo	1974–1976		
Seema Malaka	Colombo	1976–1978		
State Mortgage Bank	Colombo	1976–1978		
Panama Hotel	Panama	1977		
Martenstyn House	Colombo	1977–1979		
Meena Muttiah Hospital for the Kumarni of Chettinad	Chennai, India	1978		
House for Lidia Gunasekera	Bentota	1978–1980		
Institute for Integral Education	Piliyandala	1978–1981		
Club Villa Hotel	Bentota	1979		
Heritance Ahungalla	Ahungalla	1979–1981	Formerly the Triton Hotel	
Sri Lankan Parliament Building	Sri Jayawardenepura Kotte	1979–1982		
1980s
University of Ruhuna	Matara	1980–1988		
Sunethra Bandaranaike House	Horagolla	1984–1986		
Offices for Banque Indosuez	Colombo	1985		
Institute of Engineering Technology	Katunayake	1985		
Fitzherbert House	Tangalle	1985–1986		
De Soysa House	Colombo	1985–1991		
Bashir Currimjee House	Port Louis, Mauritius	1986–1994		
Hyatt Hotel	Sanur, Indonesia	1989		
Larry Gordon House	Wakaya, Fiji	1989		
Singapore Cloud Centre	Singapore	1989		
1990s
Heritance Kandalama	Dambulla	1991–1994	Formerly the Kandalama Hotel; The first LEED-certified project outside the United States	
Jayakody House Colombo	Colombo	1991–1996		
Sarabhai House	Ahmedabad, India	1992		
Modi House	Delhi, India	1992		
Jayakody House Bentota	Bentota	1993		
Poddar House	Bangalore, India	1994		
Avani Kalutara Resort	Kalutara	1994–1996	Formerly the Kani Lanka Resort & Spa	
Lighthouse Hotel	Galle	1995–1997		
Blue Water Hotel	Wadduwa	1996–1998		
Official Residence of the President	Sri Jayawardenepura Kotte	1997 –		
Pradeep Jayewardene House	Mirissa	1997–1998		
Spencer House	Colombo	1998		
Jacobsen House	Tangalle			
The Last House	Tangalle	1997		
2000s
Anantara Kalutara Resort	Kalutara		Completed in 2016 to Bawa's design	
Unbuilt
Galadari Hotel	Islamabad, Pakistan	1984		
U.N. Headquarters, Malé	Malé, Maldives	1985		
candoline hotel	goa, india			
Hotel at Pondicherry	india			
banyan tree	tanjung pinang, indonesia			

== Awards and fellowships ==
- Pan Pacific Citation, Hawaii Chapter of the American Institute of Architects (1967)
- President, Sri Lanka Institute of Architects (1969)
- Inaugural Gold Medal at the Silver Jubilee Celebration of the Sri Lanka Institute of Architects (1982)
- Heritage Award of Recognition, for "Outstanding Architectural Design in the Tradition of Local Vernacular Architecture", for the new Parliamentary Complex at Sri Jayawardenepura Kotte from the Pacific Area Travel Association. (1983)
- Fellow of the Royal Institute of British Architects
- Elected Honorary Fellow of the American Institute of Architects (1983)
- Conferred title of Vidya Jothi (Light of Science) in the Inaugural Honours List of the President of Sri Lanka (1985)
- Teaching Fellowship at the Aga Khan Programme for Architecture, at MIT, Boston, USA (1986)
- Conferred title Deshamanya (Pride of the Nation) in the Honours List of the President Sri Lanka (1993)
- The Grate Master's Award 1996 incorporating South Asian Architecture Award (1996)
- The Architect of the Year Award, India (1996)
- Asian Innovations Award, Bronze Award – Architecture, Far Eastern Economic Review (1998)
- The Chairman's Award of the Aga Khan Award for Architecture in recognition of a lifetime's achievement in and contribution to the field of architecture (2001)
- Awarded Doctor of Science (Honoris Causa), University of Ruhuna (14 September 2002)

== See also ==
- Lunuganga
- Charles Correa
- Tropical Modernism
