= Blue Water Hotel =

5-star boutique hotel in Sri Lanka

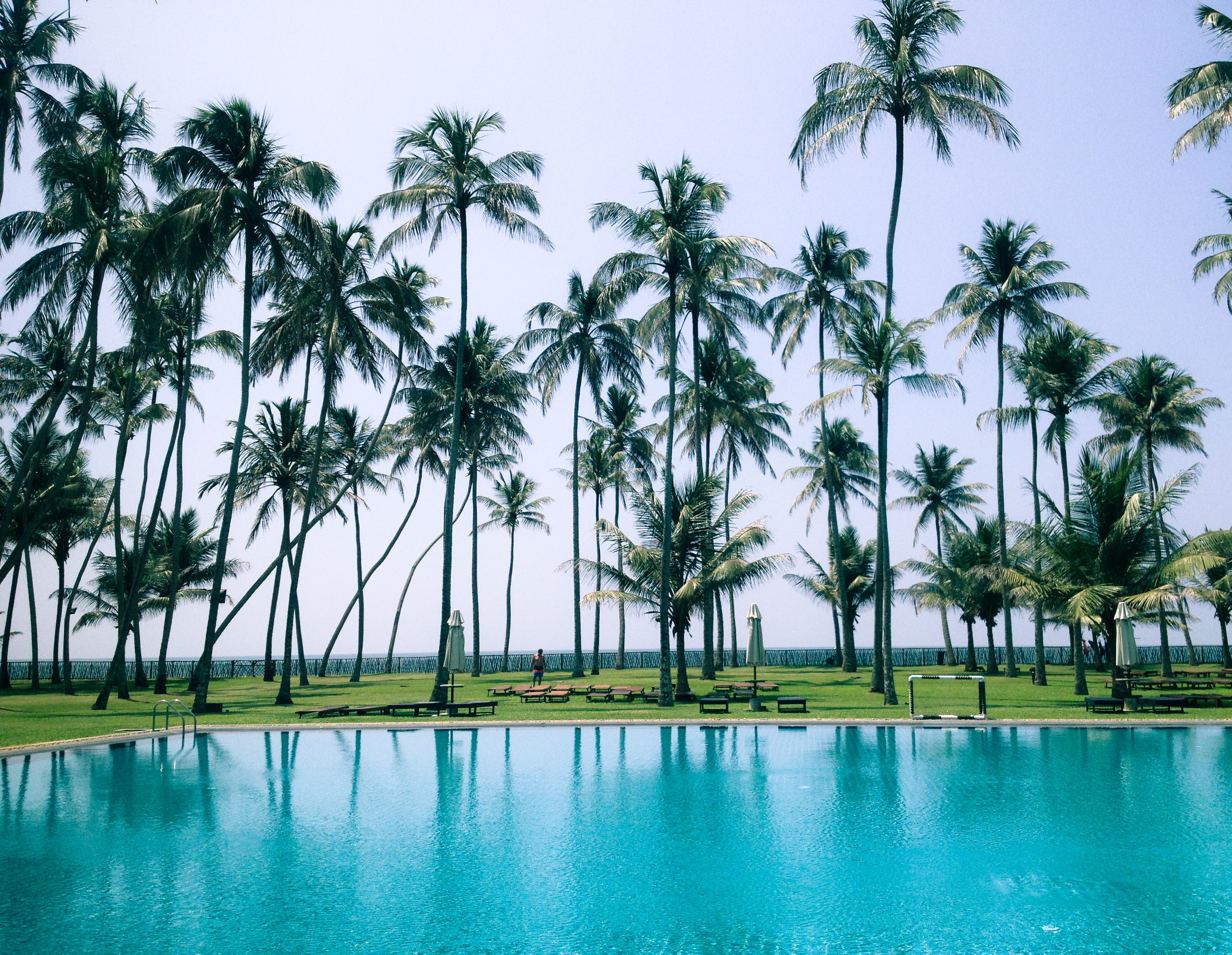

- Location within Sri Lanka

General information
- Location: Wadduwa, Sri Lanka
- Coordinates: 6°40′40″N 79°55′14″E
- Opening: 1998
- Owner: Union Resorts
- Operator: Union Resorts

Technical details
- Floor count: 3

Design and construction
- Architect: Geoffrey Bawa
- Developer: Ajit Wijesekera

Other information
- Number of rooms: 100
- Number of suites: 5
- Number of restaurants: 3

Website
- Official site

Blue Water Hotel is a 5-star boutique hotel in Wadduwa, Sri Lanka. It is notable for being Geoffrey Bawa’s last hotel project and the last project he supervised on site before succumbing to illness.

== Geography ==
The hotel is situated in Wadduwa, a small coastal town located (27 km (17 mi) south of Colombo. The site originally was a coconut plantation, situated between the beach and the coastal railway line.

== History ==
The hotel was commissioned by Ajit Wijesekera of Union Apparel (a garment manufacturer) in 1994, the design of which was a collaboration between Geoffrey Bawa and Milroy Perera. Work on the project commenced in 1996 and was completed in 1998. The hotel suffered damage to sixteen ground floor rooms as a result of the 2004 Boxing Day tsunami but there were no deaths. The hotel was initially managed by Jetwing Hotels until 2008 when it was taken over by Union Resorts, who renovated it and added a reception room/banquet room.

== Architecture ==
The hotel was one of Geoffrey Bawa's last major projects, which Patrick Kunkel of ArchDaily believes "represents a slightly more minimalistic approach to his architectural design informed by his earlier work." Australian architect, Ceridwen Owen, describes it as "exhibiting a carefully orchestrated sequence of spaces between land and ocean."

For the building design Bawa returned to a simple rest house layout, which he first used in 1967 for the Serendib Hotel, but reinterpreted on a grand scale with expansive courtyards and limitless vistas. The main entrance is a lofty porch, with an enclosing wall which screens the hotel from the adjacent railway line. The entrance doors open out to a long axial arcade running across a large garden court, past the hotel lobby and out through the coconut grove towards the sea and the horizon. David Robson in his book, Geoffrey Bawa: The Complete Works, states "the sequence of spaces is formal and controlled; the materials highly polished, light in tone and muted in colour and the architecture restrained but monumental." The hotel is an example of Bawa’s minimalist style, use of space, lengthy corridors, open views, water, terracotta tiles and frangipani trees.

== Facilities ==
The hotel has 100 rooms, two restaurants, three bars, an outdoor pool, and a spa.
