= Diyabubula =

Hotel near Dambulla, Sri Lanka

General information
- Location: Diyabubula Jungle & Art Hideaway, Kalundewa road, Dambulla, Sri Lanka
- Owner: Nimal Senanayake

Design and construction
- Architect: Laki Senanayake

Website
- diyabubula.com/en/

Diyabubula (Water Fountain) is a small luxury lodge, a boutique hotel consisting of five villas, located near the town of Dambulla and east of A9 highway in the Matale District, Central Province, Sri Lanka. It is an oasis of peace and quiet - for nature lovers, cultural interested tourists or anyone who wants to enjoy the magic of this place in the middle of beautiful art. Renowned Sri Lankan artist Laki Senanayake designed the place as a hideaway to complement his water garden.
