= Ena de Silva =

Sri Lankan painter

- Born: Ena Aluwihare; 23 October 1922; Matale, Sri Lanka
- Died: 29 September 2015 (aged 92); Matale, Sri Lanka
- Spouse: Osmund de Silva
- Children: Anil Gamini Jayasuriya, Anula Kusum

Ena de Silva (née Aluwihare) (22 October 1922 – 29 October 2015) was a notable Sri Lankan artist, credited with re-establishing the country's batik industry. She was renowned for her skillsets in the design of batiks and handicrafts and played a pivotal role in reviving the arts and crafts in Sri Lanka.

== Family ==
Ena Aluwihare was born on 23 October 1922 in Matale, the youngest of two daughters to Sir Richard Aluwihare (1895 – 1976), a civil servant who later served as the first Ceylonese Inspector General of Police (1947 – 1955) and Ceylon's High Commissioner in India (1957 – 1963), and Lady Aluwihare née Lucille Moonemalle. In 1941, at nineteen she eloped and married Osmund de Silva, a police officer, who was older than her, who would serve as the personal assistant to her father and eventually succeed him as Inspector General of Police (1955 – 1959). She moved to Jaffna and stayed there for a while since her husband was transferred to the Jaffna District. During her time in Jaffna, popular entomologist George Morrison Reid Henry turned out to be one of her neighbours. They had two children, a son, Anil Gamini Jayasuriya, also an artist and conservationist, and a daughter, Anula Kusum Gilmour.

== Education ==
She pursued her primary education at the Ladies' College and she pursued an interest in plants while being enrolled at the Ladies' College. She was deemed as a bright student in studies and was rewarded for her efforts by bagging the Ingram Shield which was the most coveted distinction in her school's curriculum and she was notably the first recipient of the award. She however narrowly missed out a golden opportunity to push her case further in education as she intended to follow Botanical Studies at the University of Colombo.

== Career ==
De Silva studied art in her youth however her artistic career began, after she and her husband approached Geoffrey Bawa in 1960 to design a house for them in Colombo. She developed a long term professional relationship with Bawa designing batik tapestries for a number of his buildings, including the Bentota Beach Hotel and the Sri Lankan Parliament Building. In 1960, she formed a firm with Laki Senanayake, Professor Reggie Siriwardena and her son. All of the batik designs of Ena de Silva were created by hand including her signature 'Tree of Life'.

In 1964 she established the Matale Heritage Centre, which produced batiks. Following her husband's death she spent two years as a Commonwealth consultant on handicrafts to the British Virgin Islands, upon her return she moved back to her ancestral home in Aluwihare in 1982. She converted her father's home in Matale into a heritage centre in 1980s where she taught various disciplines such as carpentry, needlework, brass foundry, batik production.

De Silva was awarded a lifetime achievement award by the Geoffrey Bawa Trust in 2011. She was also highly acclaimed and well respected in the arts fraternity for sharing her knowledge and experience with many young women with whom she worked with during her lifetime. She also devoted much of her time mentoring many young women, especially young school dropouts, in order to help them stand on their own as financially independent persons.
