= Benjamin Bawa =

Ceylonese lawyer

- Education: Royal College Colombo, Middle Temple
- Spouse: Bertha Marian Campbell Schrader
- Children: Bevis, Geoffrey
- Relatives: Ahamadu Bawa (father), Georgina Mathilda née Ablett (mother)
- Military career
- Allegiance: Ceylon
- Rank: Major
- Unit: Ceylon Light Infantry
- Commands: Aide-de-camp to the Governor of Ceylon

Major Benjamin William Bawa, KC, VD (1865 – 1923) was a Ceylonese (Sri Lankan) lawyer. He served as the acting Solicitor General of Ceylon, as well as the private secretary and extra aide-de-camp to the Governor of Ceylon.

== Early life and education ==
Bawa's parents were Ahamadu Bawa, a Sri Lankan Moor proctor from Galle, and his English wife, Georgina Mathilda née Ablett. Bawa was educated at S. Thomas' College and Royal College Colombo. He played at the Royal–Thomian and won the Turnour Prize.

== Legal career ==
Practicing law under James Van Langenberg, he was called to bar in 1887. Developing a practice in Kegalle and Colombo, he traveled to England in 1903 entering the Middle Temple and was called to the English Bar in 1904. On his return he developed lucrative legal practices gaining appointment as a King's Counsel. He was a member of the Council of Legal Education.

== Military career ==
He was commissioned as a second lieutenant in the Ceylon Light Infantry in 1899 and was promoted to captain in 1905. While in England he attended the School of Instruction for Officers of the Auxiliary Forces at the Chelsea Barracks. He commanded the Q (Legal) Company of the Ceylon Light Infantry. He was appointed as aide-de-camp (ADC) to Brigadier-General Sir William Manning, Governor of Ceylon, serving as his private secretary until 1923.

== Family ==
Bawa married Bertha Marian Campbell née Schrader, a Dutch Burgher woman who was the daughter of a surgeon from Kandy. His sons were Bevis Bawa, who was appointed ADC to the Governor like his father, and later became a renowned landscaper and Geoffrey Bawa, who also became a lawyer, later becoming a renowned architect.

== Death ==
Bawa was diagnosed with Bright's disease in 1922 and traveled to England for treatment with his family. He died in 1923 while convalescing in Harrogate.
