= Bentota River Airport =

- IATA: BJT; ICAO: none

Summary
- Serves: Bentota
- Location: Sri Lanka
- Coordinates: 6°25′45″N 79°59′41″E
- Interactive map of Bentota River Airport

Bentota River Airport is an airport in Bentota, Sri Lanka (IATA: BJT). It is a water aerodrome on the Bentota River used by amphibious aircraft.

== Airlines and destinations ==
Airlines	Destinations
Cinnamon Air	Colombo–Bandaranaike
