= Barefoot (retailer) =

- Company type: Privately owned
- Industry: Fashion
- Founded: 1958; 68 years ago Colombo, Sri Lanka
- Founder: Barbara Sansoni
- Headquarters: Colombo, Sri Lanka
- Area served: Worldwide
- Key people: Dominic Sansoni (CEO); Barbara Sansoni (Chairperson)
- Products: soft furnishings, fabrics, clothing, children's toys
- Website: Official website

Barefoot is a textile design company based in Sri Lanka, which exports its clothing and soft furnishings globally. Barefoot has two retail stores in Colombo and one store in Galle.

== History ==
In 1964, Barbara Sansoni, a colourist, artist and textile designer, at the suggestion of an Irish nun, Sister Good Counsel of the Sisters of the Good Shepherd, became involved in a programme established by the convent in Wattala that taught young impoverished Sri Lanka women how to weave. Sansoni with her then husband, Hildon, established and financed four village weaving centres. Sansoni's initial involvement mainly related to the design aesthetics of the material being produced.

Sansoni then began to sell the weavers' products from her home.

Barefoot currently has five weaving centres in Sri Lanka, run by the weavers, using designs by Sansoni and the Barefoot design team.

The company's flagship store, on Galle Road in Colombo, which opened in the early 1970s, is housed in a collection of buildings, centred on an old 1920s town house. The store, which sells Barefoot goods and a wide range of selected local products, also includes a bookshop, a café and an art gallery. The art gallery at the rear of the building, was previously known as the Colombo Gallery between 1967 and 1971. It was reopened in 1991 as Gallery 706 Colombo and in 1999 was renamed to its current name, Barefoot Art Gallery.

Barefoot also has a smaller store located in Galle Fort (opened in 2004) and in the Old Colombo Dutch Hospital complex (opened in 2011).

Barefoot products are available from selected retailers in Australia, France, Japan, the Maldives, the Netherlands, Switzerland, the US and the UK. Exports account for approximately 35% of Barefoot’s revenue.
