= Bentota =

Bentota Sinhala: බෙන්තොට Tamil: பென்டோட்டா
- Town
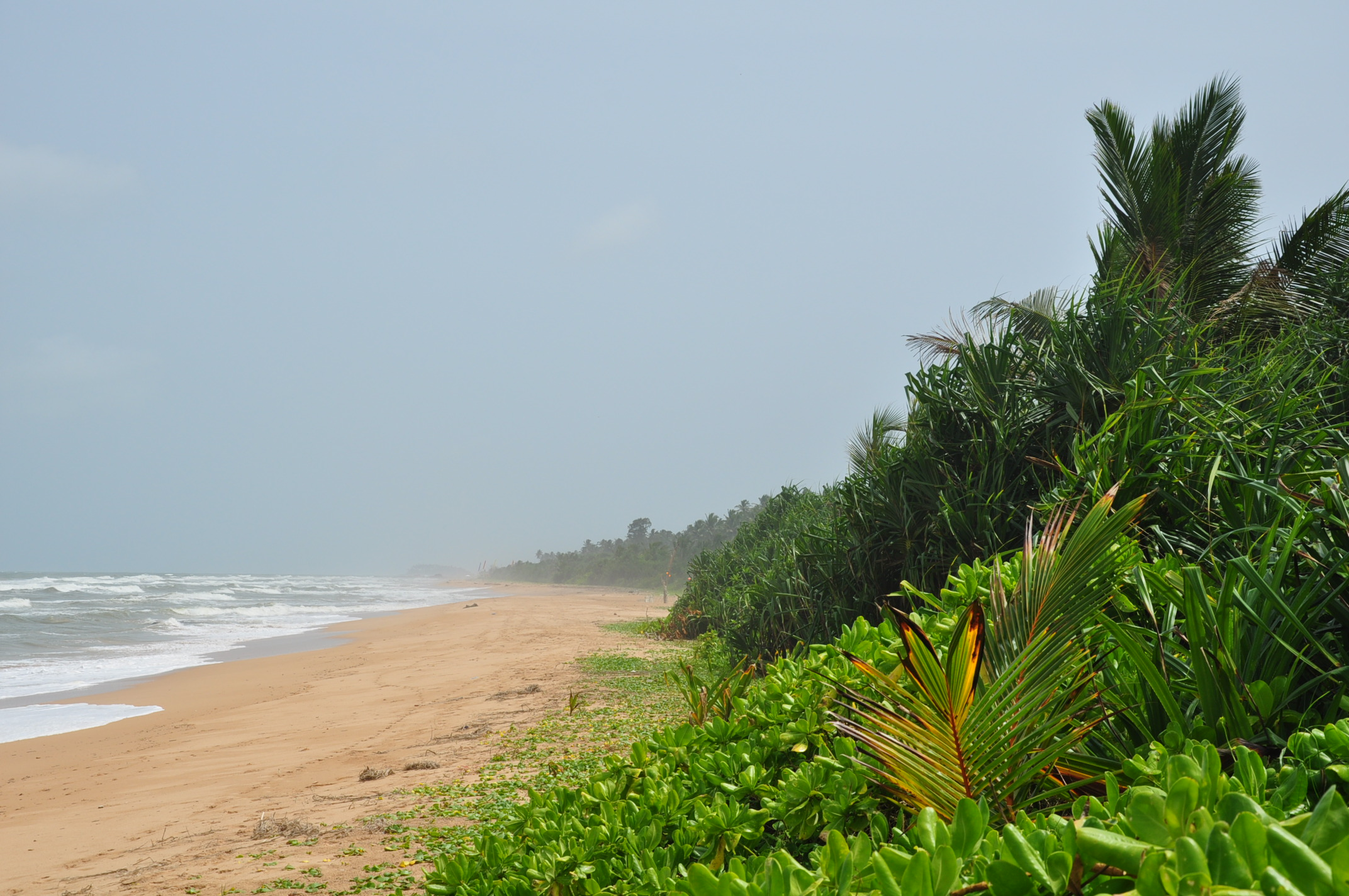
- Bentota beach

- Location within Sri Lanka
- Coordinates: 6°25′12″N 80°0′0″E
- Country: Sri Lanka
- Province: Southern Province
- District: Galle District

Population
  - Total: 37,000
- Time zone: UTC+5:30 (Sri Lanka Time)
- Postal code: 80500

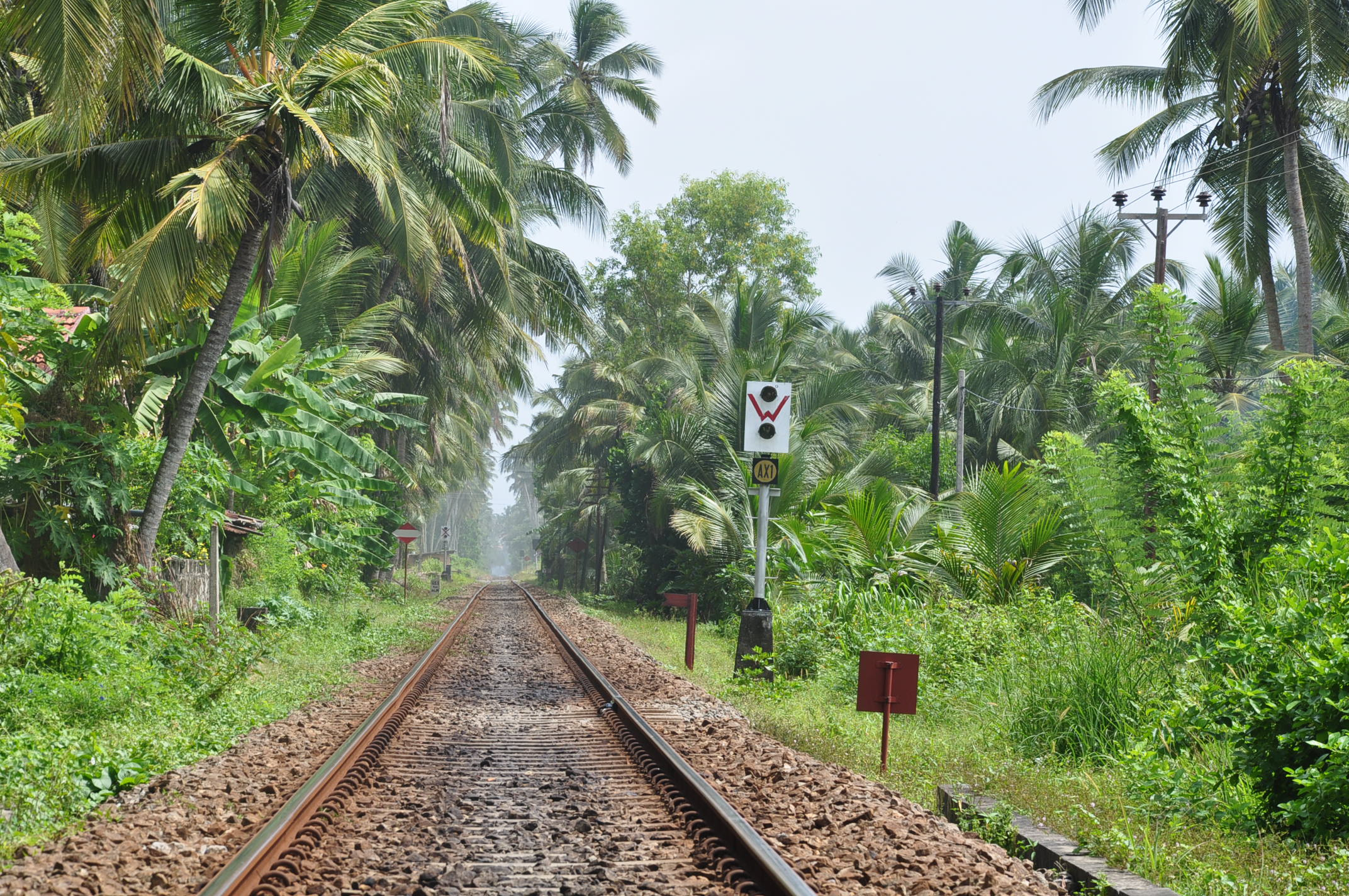
The railway Colombo – Galle at Bentota

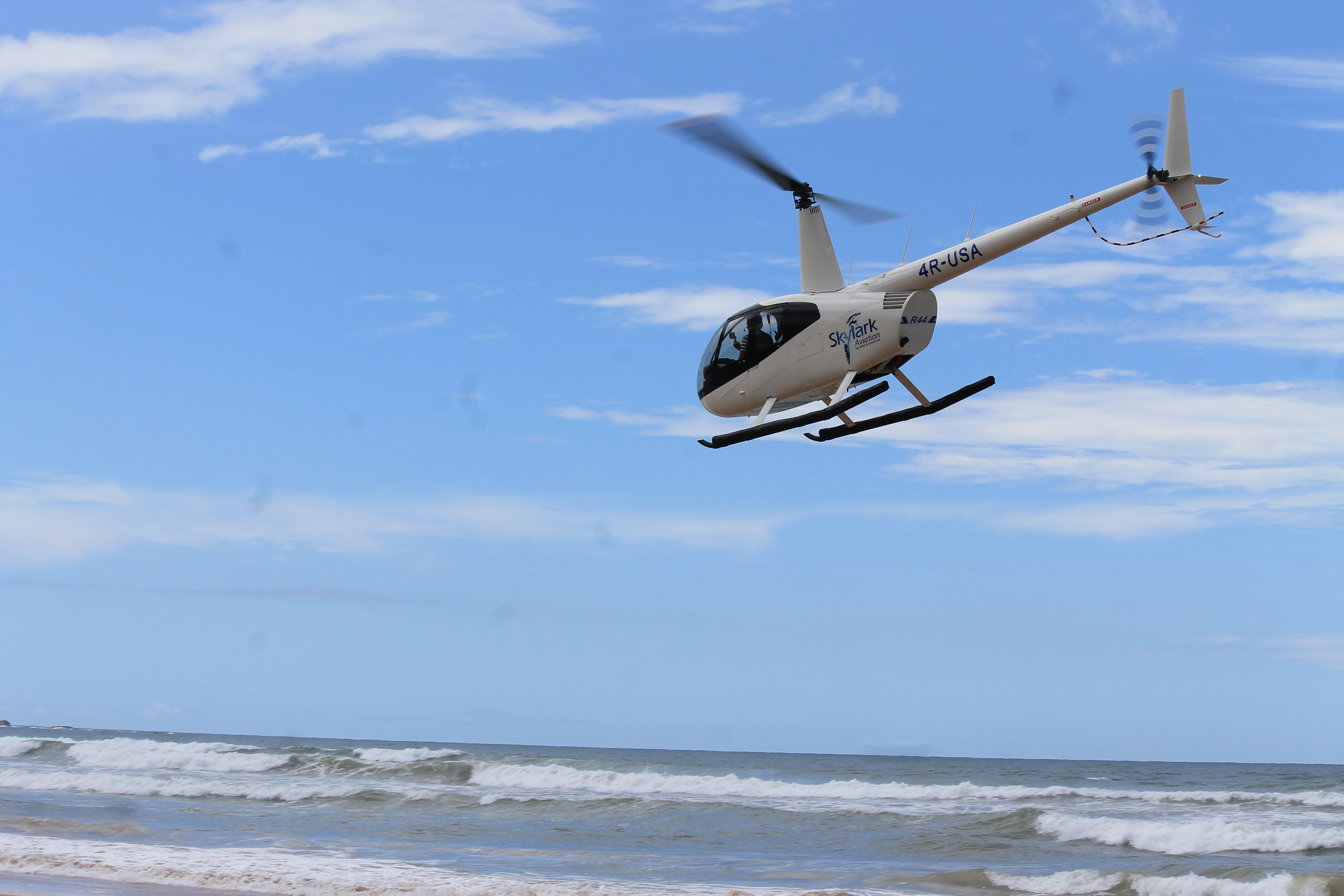
Skylark Helicopter conducting joy rides in Bentota

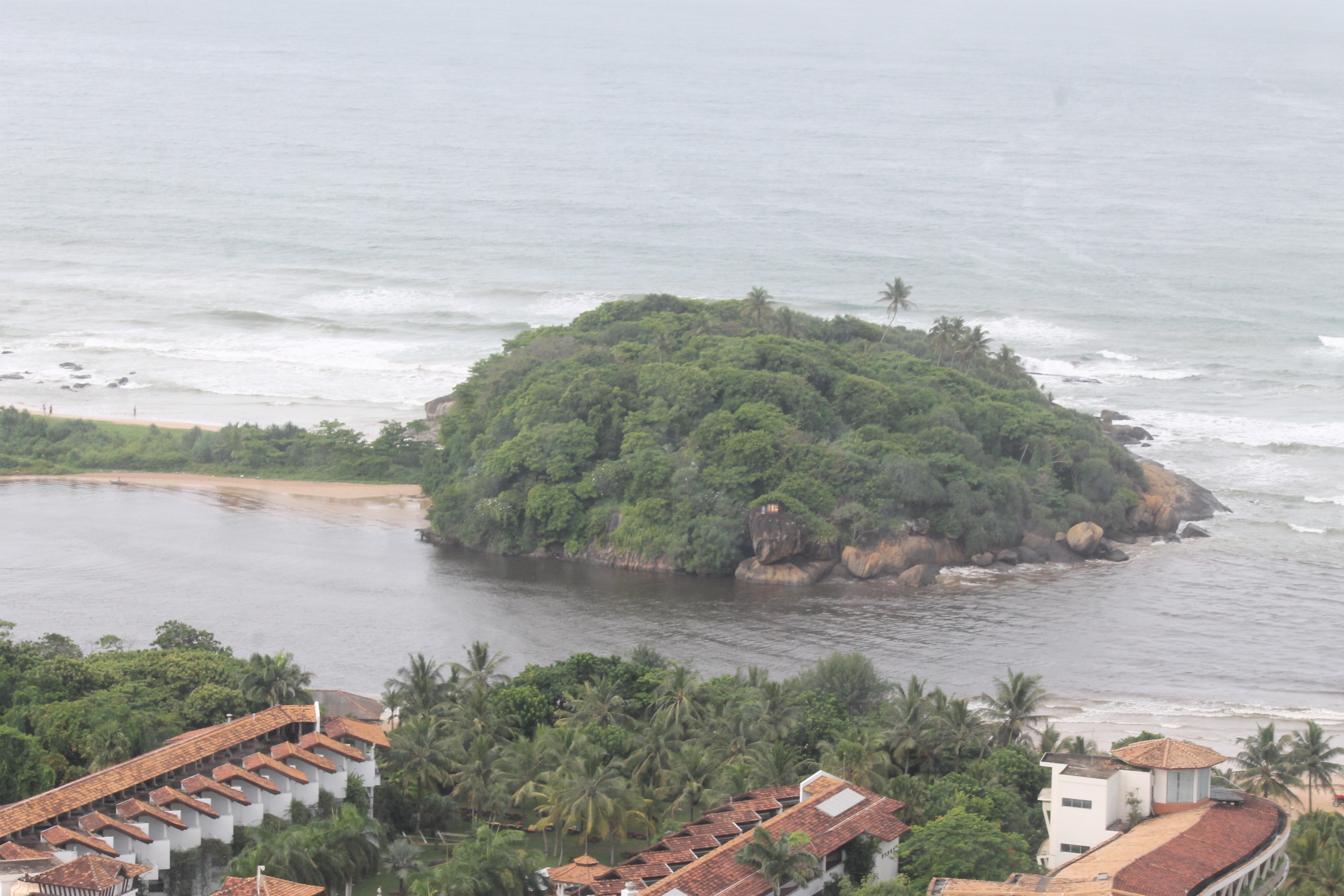
Bentota Estuary

Bentota is a coastal town in Sri Lanka, located in the Galle District of the Southern Province. It is approximately 65 kilometres (40 mi) south of Colombo and 56 kilometres (35 mi) north of Galle. Bentota is situated on the southern bank of the Bentota River mouth, at an elevation of 3 metres (9.8 ft) above the sea level.

Religion in Bentota DS Division (2012)
1. Buddhist (97.1%)
2. Hindu (0.18%)
3. Muslim (2.31%)
4. Roman Catholic (0.27%)
5. Other Christian (0.10%)
6. Other (0.01%)

== History ==
Bentota has been identified as the ancient Bhimatirtha and the area is also described in ancient messenger poems (sandeśa kāvya). It is believed that the Galapatha Viharaya (which is referred to in chronicles Mahavamsa and Pujavaliya by the name Bhimatittha Viharaya in Pasyodun District) was maybe a cluster of five ancient temples in the region. The 13th-century rock inscription at Galapatha Viharaya also mentions the name Bhimatittha.

In the 17th century the Portuguese built a small fort at the mouth of the Bentota River (Bentara Ganga), which in Sinhala was called Parangi Kotuwa, meaning the fort of the Portuguese. The river marked the southern extremity of Portuguese-held territory in Sri Lanka. The Dutch subsequently allowed the fort to fall into disrepair, converting one of the large buildings within the fort into a colonial rest house for Dutch Officers travelling between Colombo and Galle. The British subsequently converted the rest house into a coastal sanatorium. Sir James Emerson Tennent (1804–1869), the colonial secretary of Ceylon (1845–1850) in his book, Ceylon, An Account of the Island (1859), stated that the rest house at Bentota was situated within a little park, deeply shaded by lofty Tamarind trees on the point of the beach where the river forms its junction with the sea. He wrote that stated that this rest house was one of the coolest and most agreeable in Ceylon. The British introduced the railway in the early 19th century, mainly to transport the coconut produce from the deep south to the capital, building a permanent bridge (Bentota Bridge) to cross the river.

== Transport ==
Bentota is located on the Coastal or Southern Rail Line (connecting Colombo through to Matara), though Bentota Halt is only a small railway station with most trains stopping at Aluthgama, 2.5 kilometres (1.6 mi) north of Bentota. It is located on the A2 highway, connecting Colombo to Wellawaya, about 8 kilometres (5.0 mi) south of Beruwala. Access is possible from the Southern Expressway Welipenna exit and only 10 km from the exit. Helicopters fly shuttle services on charter basis.

== Economy ==
Bentota is a tourist attraction, with a local airport (Bentota River Airport) and a handful of world-class hotels. It is a destination for watersports. Bentota also delivers an ancient art of healing called Ayurveda. Bentota is famous for its toddy production, an alcoholic beverage made out of coconut nectar. It also has a turtle hatchery, located on Induruwa beach (6 km from Bentota).

== Attractions ==
- Bentota Beach
- Kosgoda Turtle Hatchery – located 11 km (6.8 mi) south of Bentota, is a community-based turtle hatchery and turtle watching project set up by the Turtle Conservation Project (TCP) in association with the Wildlife Department of Sri Lanka.
- Brief Garden – located 11 km (6.8 mi) inland from Bentota, is the house and garden of renowned Sri Lankan landscape architect, Bevis Bawa, the older brother of architect Geoffrey Bawa. Established in 1929 on the grounds of a former rubber plantation Bawa continued to develop the property until his death in 1992.
- Galapatha Raja Maha Vihara Buddhist temple, located in Bentota, contains stone inscriptions, stone carvings, pillars, ponds and troughs from the medieval period.

== See also ==
- List of towns in Southern Province, Sri Lanka
- List of beaches in Sri Lanka
