= Wadduwa =

Wadduwa වාද්දුව வாதுவை
- Suburb
- Location within Sri Lanka
- Coordinates: 6°42′48″N 79°54′15″E
- Country: Sri Lanka
- Province: Western Province
- Time zone: UTC+5:30 (Sri Lanka Standard Time Zone)
  - Summer (DST): UTC+6 (Summer time)

Wadduwa (Sinhala: වාද්දුව, Tamil: வாதுவை) is a town in the Western Province of Sri Lanka. It is situated on the western coast of Sri Lanka, about 33 km (21 mi) south of Colombo. It spans from 30.5 to 36.5 km area along the Galle Road, 4.5 km to the land side and 1 km to the seaside. It is also famous for its rich cultivation of coconut palms and as a major producer of toddy and vinegar. There are few historical places in the area such as ancient Catholic church and Dhaaldawatta Purana Maha Viharaya. Wadduwa is popular for the products made from coconut fibre such as brooms, carpets etc.

Wadduwa is governed by Panadura Pradeshiya Sabha.

== Origin of the name ==
According to folklore, there were many native indigenous doctors in this area in the past. The name for native doctors in Sinalese Language is "veda mahaththayaa", thus comes the name 'veda doova' meaning the land of the native doctors. It has later become "Wadduwa". castel of dragon lord
