= Barbara Sansoni =

Sri Lankan artist, designer, and writer (1928–2022)

Kala Suri Barbara Sansoni
- Born: 22 April 1928; Kandy, Central Province, British Ceylon
- Died: 23 April 2022 (aged 94); Colombo, Sri Lanka
- Occupations: Artist, designer and writer
- Known for: Empowerment of women weavers in Sri Lanka
- Spouse(s): Hildon Sansoni (19??–1979); Ronald Lewcock (1980–2022?)
- Children: 2

Kala Suri Barbara Sansoni (22 April 1928 – 23 April 2022) was a Sri Lankan designer, artist, colourist, entrepreneur, and writer. She was known for her works in architecture, textile designs, and handwoven panels. She founded the Barefoot textile company, a company that is highly acclaimed for its handloom fabric. She also served as the chairperson and chief designer of Barefoot Pvt. Ltd for several years.

Sansoni was said to have "redefined the concept of colour in Sri Lanka". She empowered women weavers and transformed the national cottage industry.

== Personal life ==
She married Ceylonese Proctor and Notary Public, Lieutenant in the Ceylon Royal Navy Reserve, Extra Aide-de-Camp to the Governor General Hildon Sansoni. She gave birth to two sons; Dominic and Simon.

Her first spouse Hildon died in 1979 and a year later, she engaged in her second marriage in 1980 to her longtime friend Ronald Lewcock. Ronald befriended Barbara when Ronald first met her during his sabbatical from 1968 to 1969 to explore the European Colonial Architecture in Asia. Ronald had contacted Barbara for his research work and exploration regarding the European Colonial Architecture in Asia after getting to know about Barbara's drawings being featured in the Architectural Review. Barbara and Ronald together bought a house in Cambridge in 1972 for Ronald himself and for Barbara's two sons to stay as both sons had been sent to England in the early 1970s for their educational purposes. Ronald was asked to be the guardian for Barbara's sons until they had completed their education in England.

== Education ==
She pursued her interest in buildings from childhood after witnessing the highly ceilinged, wide verandahs which were occupied by her father during his tenure as a government agent in Batticaloa, Matale and Kurunegala.

She pursued her primary and secondary education in Ceylon and in Southern India. She studied at a boarding school in Kodaikanal and studied for a year at the St. Bridget's Convent in Colombo for her Higher School Certificate. She later moved to England and studied for five years at the Regent Street Polytechnic (now known as the University of Westminster). She obtained her degree in Fine Arts from the Chelsea School of Art.

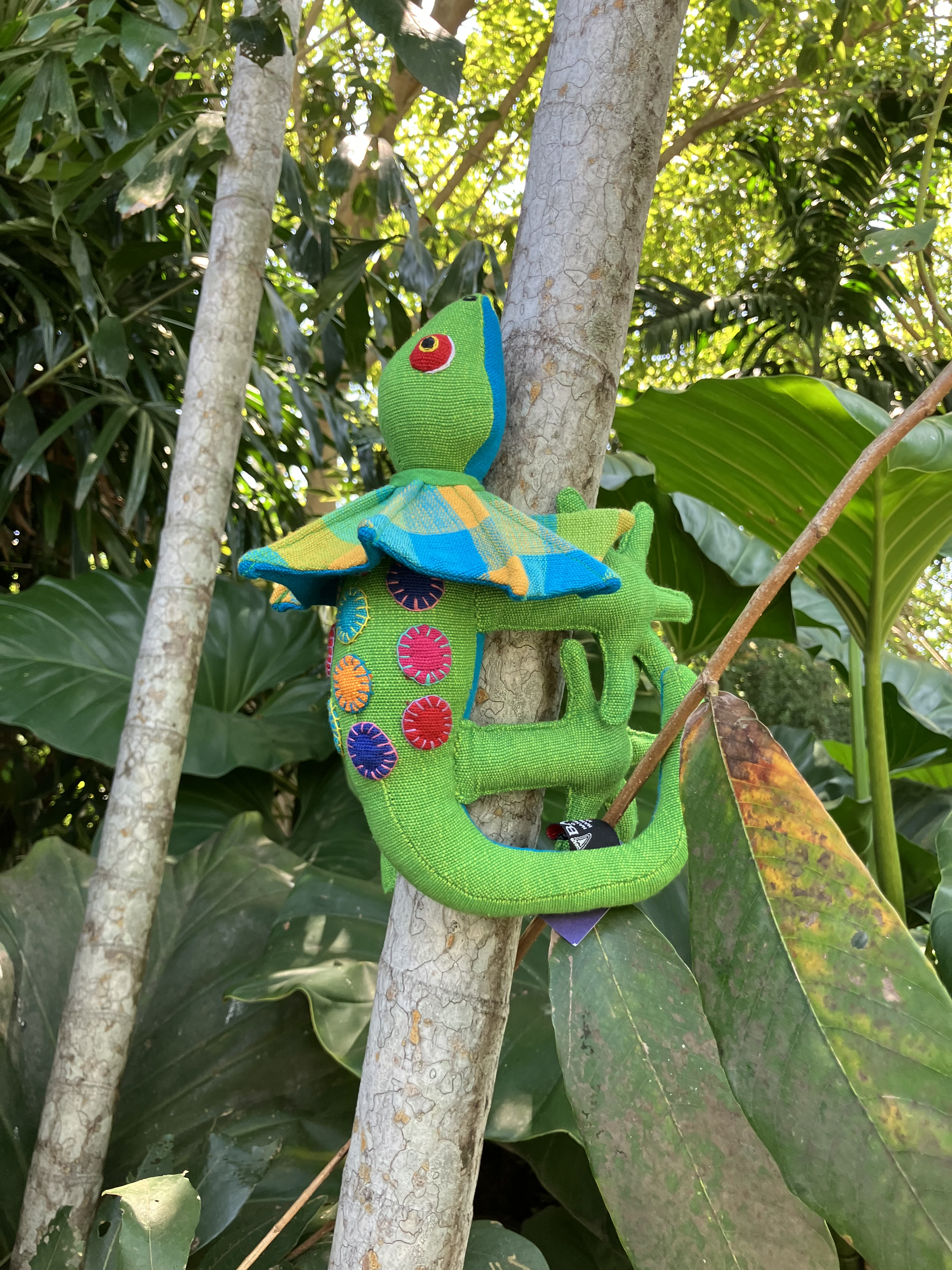
Barefoot object “Lizzard”

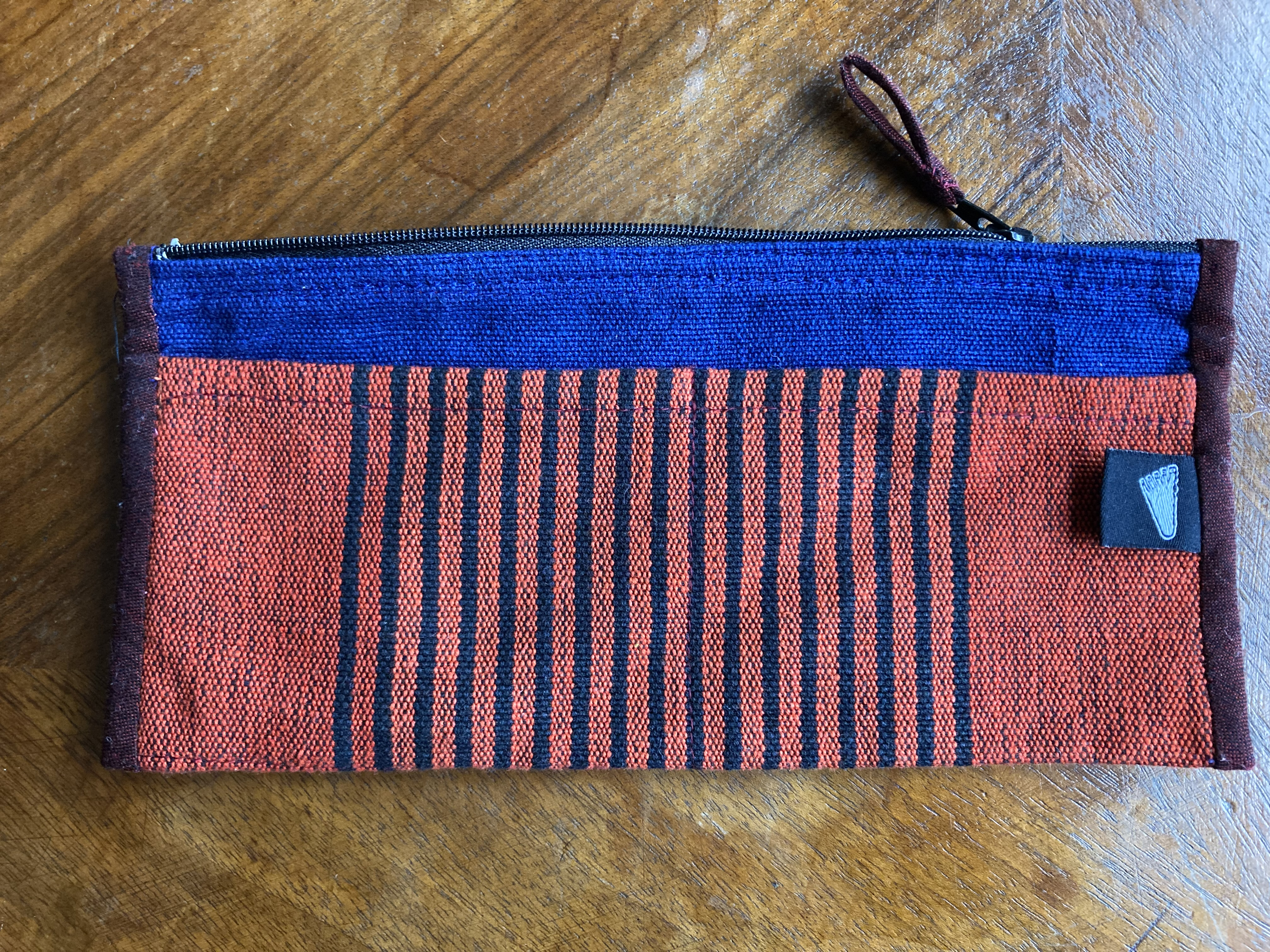
Barefoot design

== Career ==
In the 1950s, she returned to Sri Lanka from the United Kingdom and she was requested by Mother Good Counsel, Provincial of the Good Shepherd nuns to promote and enhance the handloom weaving by young women under the nun's care. She unanimously accepted the suggestion of an Irish nun, Sister Good Counsel of the Sisters of the Good Shepherd, to become involved in a programme established by the convent in Wattala that taught young impoverished Sri Lanka women how to weave. Sansoni's initial involvement mainly related to the design aesthetics of the material being produced.

She founded the Barefoot in 1958 in an attempt to empower and guide women weavers in rural parts of Sri Lanka. She laid the foundation by establishing Barefoot to provide employment for the young women who were under the nun's care on the request made by Mother Good Counsel, Provincial of the Good Shepherd nuns. During late 1960s, she opened the first Barefoot shop in Colombo. The first exports of Barefoot retailer were sent to the Scandinavian nations. Barbara began making geometric interpretations of her paintings on the loom during her early career especially after launching Barefoot. She then established the Barefoot Boutique in 1964 which was one of the only outlets in Colombo at that time to supply innovative design items.

She also worked as a journalist and essayist at the now defunct English newspapers Ceylon Daily Mirror and Times of Ceylon during the early 1960s. Her sketch drawings on the ancient buildings were published in a weekly series titled "Collecting Old Buildings" in 1962 and 1963 in the Ceylon Daily Mirror. Some were used by Geoffrey Bawa and Ulrik Plesner for their article in the Architectural Review of February 1966. During her stint as a part-time journalist, she wrote a series of articles and essays from 1961 to 1963 about traditional vernacular buildings. She along with a small team of four members which also included Ismeth Raheem, Ulrik Plesner and Laki Senanayake documented few of the rare and traditional indigenous buildings of the 17th to early 19th century.

Sansoni had many exhibitions in Asia, Europe and North America, showcasing her textile designs, drawings, paintings and handwoven panels. She conducted her first one-woman exhibition in London in 1966. She used many coloring techniques including the "warp and weft of colour" changing the spatial experience in readymade ways.

She has made several publications including Viharas and Verandahs (1978). She in collaboration with her husband Ronald Lewcock and Laki Senanayake co-authored a book titled The Architecture of an Island (1998) which is a collection of sketches depicting religious, domestic and public buildings of Sri Lanka. She published her first book on children's genre titled Miss Fu and Tikkiri Banda in 2002. She published a book titled A Passion for Faces in 2014 which recounts the collection of memories from her personal experiences at Barefoot. One of her short essays featured in a book based on Geoffrey Bawa which was written and published under the same name by French-American historian Brian Taylor.

== Honours ==
In 1970, she won the J. D. Rockefeller Travel Award for her two years of travel experience across 14 countries during which she studied textiles and architecture.

She received the Zonta Woman of Achievement from the Zonta Club of Colombo in 1987. She also won the Woman Entrepreneur of the Year in gold category in 1997 from the Women's Chamber of Industry and Commerce.

She was conferred with a Kala Suri from the Government of Sri Lanka in 2005 during the 2005 Sri Lankan national honours in recognition of her special contributions to the development of the arts. She received a Geoffrey Bawa Special Lifetime Achievement Award in 2011 for her contributions to art and architecture.

In 2016, she was conferred with an Honorary Doctor of Philosophy degree by the University of the Visual and Performing Arts of Sri Lanka.

== Death ==
Sansoni died on 23 April 2022, about an hour after her 94th birthday. The Barefoot stores were closed in mourning on 24 and 25 April.

== Publications ==
- Lewcock, Ronald; Sansoni, Barbara; Senanayake, Laki (2010). The Architecture of an Island - The Living Heritage of Sri Lanka. Barefoot. ISBN 9559466003.
- Vihares + Verandas Ceylon. Printed by Lake house printers & publishers Ltd. 41 W.A.D. Ramanayake Mawatha, Colombia 2 & published by Barbara Sansoni Fabrics Ltd., 15A Anderson Road, Colombo 5 Sri Lanka (Ceylon) may 1978
