= Prime Minister's Office (Sri Lanka) =

Agency overview
- Formed: 1947
- Jurisdiction: Government of Sri Lanka
- Headquarters: Sirimathipaya, Sir Ernest de Silva Mawatha, Colombo
- Minister responsible: Prime Minister
- Agency executive: G. P. Saputhanthri, Permanent Secretary
- Website: Official website

The Prime Minister's Office is a ministry of the Government of Sri Lanka. It provides the administrative and institutional framework for the exercise of the duties and responsibilities vested in the Prime Minister of Sri Lanka. From 1947 to 1978 it was the most powerful office within the government. However, after the creation of the executive presidency in 1978 the post of Prime Minister became more or less nominal and functions as a deputy to the President, with a few exceptions.

== Staff ==
- Secretary to the Prime Minister – G. P. Saputhanthri

== History ==
With the establishment of the post of Prime Minister of Ceylon in 1947, under the Soulbury Commission, the first prime minister, D. S. Senanayake took the portfolio of External Affairs and Defence. The early Prime Minister's Office was located at Senate Square consisting of a working office room of the Prime Minister, along with rooms of the Prime Minister's Secretary (Permanent Secretary rank), Assistant Secretary (from the Ceylon Civil Service), a Private Secretary, along with clerical and support staff. The Ministry of External Affairs and Defence was also located at Senate Square, along with the Cabinet office and the Senate of Ceylon. Some Prime Minister's preferred to work from their official residence Temple Trees or from their personal residence. Per the Westminster tradition, the prime minister had an office at the Parliament too.

With the 1978 Constitution, the president became both head of state and government. The first prime minister in the new capacity, Ranasinghe Premadasa set about defining the new role of the prime minister. He established the Prime Minister's Office at the Sirimathipaya Mansion in 1978, which houses the office of the Prime Minister's Secretary and Secretariat.

=== Terrorist attack ===
The LTTE carried out a suicide bombing at the Prime Minister's Office, on January 5, 2000 in an assassination attempt when a female suicide bomber detonated the bomb outside the Prime Minister's Office, killing 13 civilians and three police officers attached to the PMSD.

=== 2022 Sri Lankan protests ===
On 13 July 2022, during the 2022 Sri Lankan protests, thousands of protesters stormed and occupied the Prime Minister's Office, after the President's House, the Presidential Secretariat and Temple Trees been stormed and occupied on the 9 July 2022 demanding that both president Gotabaya Rajapaksa and prime minister Ranil Wickremesinghe resign immediately.

== Former Permanent Secretaries ==
- Nandasara Atukorala, CMG, CBE (September 1947 - October 1953)
- Pararajasingam Nadesan, CMG, OBE, CCS (October 1953 - April 1956)
- Bradman Weerakoon, CCS (September 1959 - 1970)
- M.D.D.Peiris, CAS (May 1970 - July 1977)
- W.P.M.B. Menikdiwela, SLAS (July 1977 - February 1978)
- Eardly Goonawardana, SLAS (February 1978 - September 1979)
- Bradman Weerakoon, SLAS (September 1979 - March 1984)
- K.H.J.Wijedasa (March 1984 - February 1989)
- K.M.Abeysinghe (February 1989 - August 1994)
- K. Balapatabendi, PC (August 1994 - November 1994)
- Hemasiri Fernando (November 1994 - December 1999)
- V.K.Nanayakkara (November 2000 - December 2001)
- Bradman Weerakoon, SLAS (December 2001 - April 2004)
- Lalith Weeratunga, SLAS (April 2004 - November 2005)
- Mahinda Bandusena, SLAS (November 2005 - April 2010)
- S. Amarasekara, SLPS (April 2010 - January 2015)
- Saman Ekanayake (January 2015 - October 2018)
- S. Amarasekara, SLPS (October - December 2018)
- Saman Ekanayake (December 2018 - November 2019)
- Gamini Senarath, SLAS (November 2019 – January 2022)

== Former Chiefs of Staff ==
- Sagala Ratnayaka (January 2015 - September 2015)

== Former Deputy Chiefs of Staff ==
- Rosy Senanayake (January 2015 - 19 March 2018)

== See also ==
- Prime Minister of Sri Lanka
- Prime Minister's House
- Presidential Secretariat
