= Sirimathipaya Mansion =

Location of Sri Lankan prime minister's office

General information
- Location: 58 Earnest de Silva Mawatha, Colombo 07, Colombo, Sri Lanka
- Current tenants: Prime Minister's Office
- Completed: 1916; 110 years ago
- Client: Albert Emmanuel de Silva
- Owner: Government of Sri Lanka

Sirimathipaya Mansion houses the Prime Minister's Office. It is located on Sir Ernest de Silva Mawatha (formerly Flower Road), Cinnamon Gardens, Colombo, Sri Lanka.

== History ==
The mansion was built in 1916 by Albert Emmanuel de Silva, a wealthy businessmen for his son Sir Ernest de Silva who was one of the richest people in the country, during which the house was equipped then with horse stables and tennis courts. Following the death of Sir Ernest in 1957, the house remain within the de Silva family until it was given to the state by the family in 1960. Between 1960 and 1978, the building housed the Ministry of Education and Broadcasting, and the Ministry of Local Government, Housing and Construction. It was in a state of disrepair. In 1978 Prime Minister Ranasinghe Premadasa had the building renovated and moved the Prime Minister office into the mansion. It underwent another restoration in 2021.

=== Terrorist attack ===
The LTTE carried out a suicide bombing at the Prime Minister's Office, on 5 January 2000, in an attempted assassination, in which a female suicide bomber detonated a bomb outside the building, killing thirteen civilians and three police officers attached to the PMSD.

== See also ==
- Temple Trees
