= Duty-free permit =

Duty-free permit (or Duty-free vehicle permit or Motor Vehicle Permit on Concessionary Terms) is a permit issued by the Treasury of the Government of Sri Lanka that allows its holder to import a vehicle into Sri Lanka on duties concessions or exempt from certain taxes. The practice had been started by government of Prime Minister Sirimavo Bandaranaike.

== Currently entitled ==
Following category of individuals are entitled to duty-free permits;

- Legislators
  - Members of Parliament
  - Provincial councilors
- Public officers (who have served a minimum term defined)
  - Senior grade officers of the public service, parliament or appointed by cabinet minister.
  - Officers of holding the posts of medical officer, engineer, accountant, architect and lawyer.
  - Senior executives of state corporations or statutory institutions.
  - Senior academics and executives of state universities.
  - Executive grade officers in the Central Bank of Sri Lanka.
  - Executive grade officers defined by the Department of Management Services;
    - Senior executives
    - Charted Engineers, Charted Accountants and Charted Architects
  - Chancellors of the Universities
  - Registered Medical Officers
  - Project Directors, Charted Engineers, Charted Accountants, Charted Architects and lawyers of a development project
  - Chairmen and members of a commission established as per the provisions of the constitution
- Military officers
  - Officers of the ranks and above lieutenant colonel, wing commander and commander.
