= Rahula College =

Location
- Matara; Matara; Sri Lanka; 5.953106°N 80.535447°E

Information
- Type: National
- Motto: Pali: අත්තානං දමයන්ති පණ්ඩිතා Aththānang damayanthi pandithā (A wise man controls himself)
- Religious affiliation: Buddhist
- Established: 1923; 103 years ago
- Principal: Virajith Kadawadduwa
- Staff: 250+
- Grades: 1–13
- Gender: Boys
- Age range: 6 to 19
- Enrollment: 4900
- Language: Sinhala, English
- Colors: Blue, golden orange
- Song: ශ්‍රිලක නිලඹරයෙහි...
- Rival: Dharmapala Vidyalaya St. Thomas' College, Matara
- Affiliations: Matara Buddhists' Society (1923); Sujatha Vidyalaya
- Alumni: Old Rahulions
- Website: rahulacollege.lk

Rahula College (Sinhala: රාහුල විද්‍යාලය, romanized: Rāhula Vidyālaya) is one of Sri Lanka’s boys’ schools, located in Matara district. Though it was originally a private Buddhist school, it is now run by the government of Sri Lanka, as a National School. Rahula College has two sections–the primary section, which serves students from grade 1 to grade 5, and the secondary section, which serves students from grade 6 to grade 13.

== History ==
In 1921, Frederick Gordon Pearce (principal of Mahinda College, Galle), D. T. W. Rajapaksha Ralahami, and Sir R. S. S. Gunawardana established the "Buddhists Society". On 1 May 1923, the Buddhists Society opened a school named Parakramabhahu Vidyalaya, in a rented building on Main Street, Matara. Parakramabhahu Vidyalaya's motto was "May I be a true Buddhist". Hewabowalage Yasapala was the first student. Parakramabhahu Vidyalaya was shifted to the "Saram Mudali Walawwa" which was donated by C. A. Odiris de Silva, with the new name of "Rahula College". C.A. Odiris de Silva's second son C.A. Ariyathilake, who also donated Matara's leading girls' school Sujatha Vidyalaya, donated this school to the government.

Rahula College currently has over 4,900 students.

Matara District

== Principals ==
	Period	Name
1st	1923 – 1932	G. William De Silva
2nd	1932 – 1936	C. Amirthalingam
3rd	1936 – 1937	J. R. Bhatt
4th	1937 – 1956	D. J. Kumarage
5th	1956 – 1973	B. P. Ariyawansa
6th	1973 – 1979	B. Suriarachchi
7th	1979 – 1983	A. H. Godavitharana
8th	1983 – 1986	P. Wijewardana
9th	1986 – 1987	Mahinda Jagoda
10th	1987 – 1989	N. Weerathunga
11th	1989 – 1990	A. M. Liyanage
12th	1990 – 1998	N. Ariyawansha
13th	1998 – 2002	Sarath Gunarathna
14th	2002 – 2010	Kithsiri Liyanagamage
15th	2010 – 2016	Nimal Dissanayake
16th	2016 –2021	Francis Welage
17th	2021 –2023	Sudath Samarawickrama
18th	2023 –2025	Samitha Kurukulasooriya
19th	2025 – 2026	Tharaka Ekanayake
20th	2026–present	Virajith Kadawadduwa

== Primary section ==
Rahula Primary is located in Welegoda. It was established in 1991, at the site of the former Sudarshana Model School. There are classes from grade 1 to grade 5.

== Sports ==
=== Football ===
The annual Rahula - Thomas football encounter or Battle of Golden Ensigns, is an annual football match played between Rahula College and St. Thomas' College, Matara.

=== Cricket ===
In 2012 Rahula College and Dharmapala College commenced an annual match, the Battle of Golden Lions (රුහුණු -මායා සටන). The inaugural match was held on Uyanwatta Stadium, with Rahula College hosting the event.

== Houses ==
There are four student houses in the college, named after historical figures in South Asia. They are:

- Ashoka :

Named after Ashoka. The house colour is red.

- Gemunu :

Named after Dutugamunu. The house colour is blue.

- Parakrama :

Named after Parakramabahu I. The house colour is yellow.

- Vijaya :

Named after Prince Vijaya. The house colour is green.

== Notable alumni ==
Alumni of Rahula College Matara are called Rahulians. Following is a list of some notable alumni:

Name	Notability	Reference
Nandika Sanath Kumanayake	Presidential Secretariat (Sri Lanka)(2026–present)	
Nandalal Weerasinghe	17th Governor of the Central Bank of Sri Lanka	
D. E. W. Gunasekera	MP - National List (2004-2015), Minister of Constitutional Reform (2004-2010)	
Buddhika Pathirana	MP - Matara (2010–2024)	
K. Balapatabendi	Permanent Secretary to the President of Sri Lanka (1994-2003), former Chairman SriLankan Airlines, Former Sri Lankan High Commissioner to Australia and New Zealand	
Dhammika Kitulgoda	former District Judge, Secretary General of Parliament (1999–2002, 2008–2012)	
Gunasena Galappatty	Sri Lankan dramatist, Sinhala Radio Play writer	
Victor Hettigoda	Sri Lankan entrepreneur	
Suraj Randiv	Sri Lanka international cricketer (2010–present)	
Pramodya Wickramasinghe	Sri Lanka international cricketer (1991-2002)	
Asoka Abeygunawardana	Chairman/CEO Strategic Enterprise Management Agency (SEMA)	
Sarath Wijesinghe	Senator (1947-1965), President of the Senate of Ceylon (1962-1965)	
Amara Hewamadduma	former government agent, literary figure, historian	
Tilake Abeysinghe	Internationally reputed painter and sculptor - awarded “Cavaliere of the Order of Merit" (knighthood) by the Italian Government.	
Mahinda Yapa Abeywardena	Speaker of the Parliament of Sri Lanka, Minister of Parliamentary Affairs (February 2015 – May 2015), Minister of Agriculture (2010-2015), Minister of Cultural Affairs (2005–2010), Deputy Minister of Healthcare & Nutrition (2004–2005), Chief Minister of Southern Province (1994–2001)	
Lalith Weeratunga	Presidential Secretariat (Sri Lanka)(2005-2015), Secretary to the Prime Minister(2004-2005)	
Janak Gamage	Sri Lanka international cricketer(1995), Head coach of Bangladesh women's cricket team(2014-2016), Head coach of Thailand women's cricket team(2016–Present)	
Isuru Lokuhettiarachchi	Actor	
