= Amara Hewamadduma =

Sri Lankan historian (1939–2013)

Amara Hewamadduma, with his wife Sandapali, 2007

Amara Hewamadduma, also Amara Hēvāmadduma (5 September 1939 – 27 June 2013) was a Sri Lankan government agent, literary figure and historian.

== Biography ==
Hewamadduma was born the tenth of twelve children on 5 September 1939 in Matara, Sri Lanka. He attended Rahula College in Matara and the University of Peradeniya. He was then a lecturer at an academy for boys, Sri Lanka Vidyalaya, Maradana and the associated school for girls, Chandralekha Mawatha, Borella, where he met his wife. He joined the army and was made full lieutenant in 1964.

In 1965, he became the Assistant Commissioner of Agrarian Services in the Ministry of Agriculture, having joined the Sri Lanka Administrative Service. In 1977, he became the Government Agent of Anuradhapura and three years later became Chairman of the Sri Lanka Transport Board. He was secretary to several ministries, including Cultural Affairs and Socio-Cultural Integration. Until his retirement in 1999, he was secretary to the Ministry of Social Welfare.

He authored dozens of books on history, agriculture, and Buddhist culture and contributed columns to newspapers besides taking part in TV and radio programs.

He lived with his wife, Sandapali Sandanayaka, with whom they had a son and two daughters, in Vijayaba Mawatha, Kalubowila. Adjoining their house was a three-story library building.

== Publications ==
By 2007, he had published more than 50 books, including:

- Hewamadduma, Amara. Mātara kaviya, 1990.
- Hewamadduma, Amara. Miyuguṇa hā Ruhuṇa
- Hewamadduma, Amara (ed.), Dhammapada, Pali-Sinhala-Tamil-English Version. Colombo, 1994.
- Hewamadduma, Amara; Wijeranthna, W.G.; Ariyadasa, Edwin; Kailasanathan, Rajalakshmi; Wajirasena, Wissvanath; Kanagamurthi, Sinnaiah; Edmund, K.B.A.; Jayasuriya, Edmund. Dhammapada. Sri Lanka: National Integration Program Unit, 2002.
- Hewamadduma, Amara. Sinhalaye Sinhaya, a biography of Cabinet Minister R.G. Senanayake, 2011
- Hewamadduma, Amara. Aloko Udapadi, Sarasavi Publisher, 2013. ISBN 955-671-912-1 (Sinhalese)
- Hewamadduma, Amara. Amara Samara - 6 , Sarasavi Publisher, 2011. (Sinhalese)
- Hewamadduma, Amara. Amara Samara - 7 , Sarasavi Publisher, 2011. ISBN 955-671-363-8 (Sinhalese)
- Hewamadduma, Amara. Amara Samara - 8 , Sarasavi Publisher, 2011. ISBN 955-6714-43-X (Sinhalese)
- Hewamadduma, Amara. Amara Samara - 9 , Sarasavi Publisher, 2013. ISBN 955-671-900-8 (Sinhalese)
- Hewamadduma, Amara. Amara Samara - 10 , Sarasavi Publisher, 2013. ISBN 955-671-901-6 (Sinhalese)
