= Charles Ernest Jones =

British colonial civil servant

Sir Charles Ernest Jones, CMG, CCS (1892–1953) was a British colonial civil servant. He had a long career in the Ceylon Civil Service and served as Secretary to the Treasury.

== Life ==
He was the only son of Edwin Harris Jones R.N. of Drayton, Hampshire. He was educated at Portsmouth Technical College, and graduated B.A. from the University of London in 1911, B.Sc. in 1913.

Jones joined the Ceylon Civil Service on 28 November 1914. He became a member of the Asiatic Society in 1917, that year as a Cadet becoming an office assistant in Kegalle District. He was Assistant Government Agent in Mannar District in the 1920s, moving to Trincomalee District in November 1935, having been acting agent at Uva that year.

In 1941 Jones was Controller of Exchange, Imports and Exports. He took over as acting Financial Secretary of Ceylon from Harold James Huxham, in November 1942, for a few months. He several times held the post under that condition, for example during the first half of 1945, and again in 1946 when the official holder was Sir Oliver Goonetilleke. In the latter period, as acting Financial Secretary, he sided with N. U. Jayawardena, seconded to the Treasury Department, who had raised hackles in the Civil Service Association.

Jones became a director of the Bank of Ceylon, in the Dominion of Ceylon, in 1949. He was knighted CMG in 1950, at which time he was Permanent Secretary in the Ceylon Ministry of Finance. In 1951 he was serving as Permanent Secretary to J. R. Jayewardene.

== Family ==
In 1923 Jones married Hilda Yorath, daughter of George Yorath of Ross-on-Wye, who survived him: they had one son. He was Michael Yorath Jones (b. 1924), educated at Marlborough College, who served in the RNVR and then worked for Shell from 1947.
