= Evadne (disambiguation) =

Evadne is a name from Greek mythology.

Evadne may also refer to:

- Evadne (crustacean), a genus of water fleas
- HMS Evadne, a yacht launched in 1931 and converted into a naval vessel during the Second World War

== People with the given name ==
- Evadne Baker (1937–1995), South African actress
- Evadne Price (1888–1985), Australian-British writer, actress, and media personality
- Evadne D'Oliveira (1929–2010), Guyanese writer
- Evadne de Silva, Sri Lankan politician
