= Sanath Weerakoon =

Sri Lankan civil servant

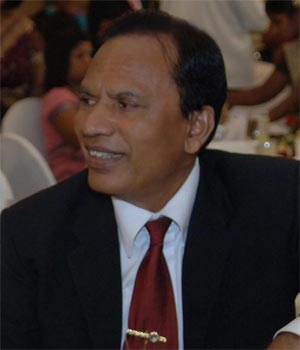

Add. Private Secretary to the President of Sri Lanka
- Incumbent
- Assumed office 15 March 2016

Chairman - Sri Lanka Cashew Corporation
- In office 20 May 2010 – 4 December 2015

Chairman - Urban Development Authority of Sri Lanka
- In office 24 December 2008 – 24 April 2010

Government Agent
- In office 1 April 1990 – 1 November 1999

Personal details
- Born: Mahaheella, Beliatta Hambantota District, Sri Lanka
- Spouse: Asoka Weerakoon
- Children: 3
- Education: University of Ceylon, The Hague University, University of Hawaiʻi & UNAFEI, T0KYO japan
- Occupation: Former'Government Agent & District Secretary of COLOMBO District, Secretary to a Cabinet Ministry, presently a Chairman of a Corporation
- Profession: Sri Lanka Administrative Service

Sanath Rathnayake Weerakoon is a Sri Lankan former government civil servant. He served as the government agent (district secretary) for the District of Colombo from 1990 to 1999. In his career with the Sri Lanka Administrative Service he served under two different governments and his ten-year tenure is the longest tenure recorded.

Earlier in his career, Weerakoon became the youngest-ever government agent when appointed to the District of Puttalam in 1978. The post of government agent is the administrative head of public services in the district and was established by the British during the colonial era. Weerakoon was appointed Additional Private Secretary to the president of Sri Lanka in 2016.

== Education ==
Weerakoon was educated at Weerakatiya Central School, where he passed the Senior School Certificate in English Medium 1st Shy. Weerakoon was the only student to do so in Hambantota District in 1956.

In 1957, Weerakoon entered the Tellijawila Central College, where he successfully completed the Higher School Certificate. He was ranked 40th from the country and entered the University of Ceylon in 1959.

At the age of 22, he graduated from the University of Ceylon with Honours in geography and was appointed as a graduate teacher in the same year. Later at the age of 25, Weerakoon was promoted as the principal of Tangalle Maha Vidyalaya.

Weerakoon completed his postgraduate studies at The Hague University in Netherlands, the University of Hawaiʻi in United States and at the United Nations Asia and Far East Institute (UNAFEI) in Japan.

== Sri Lanka Administrative Service ==
Weerakoon passed the Ceylon Civil Service entrance exam in 1967, when 30,000 graduates sat this tough exam and only 70 were successful in passing. In the 1970s the Ceylon Civil Service was abolished and replaced with the Sri Lanka Administrative Service. Weerakoon after 10 years of service in the SLAS, became a Class 1 SLAS Officer.

Weerakoon has since held number of senior positions in the SLAS and notably the below:

- 1978–1982 government agent for Puttalam District
- 1982–1982 commissioner general of the Department of Probation and Child Care Services
- 1982–1986 director general of the Sri Lanka School of Social Work
- 1986–1987 additional secretary to the Ministry of Security for Commercial & Industrial Establishments
- 1990–1999 government agent for Colombo District
- 1990–1999 additional secretary to the Cabinet Ministry of Public Administration and Home Affairs
- 1999–2000 permanent secretary to the Cabinet Ministry of Plantation Industries

Weerakoon has been a consultant, an advisor and chairman to a number of private-sector firms, corporations, boards and commissions, some of which are as follows:

- chairman of the Urban Development Authority of Sri Lanka
- chairman of the Environmental Council of Sri Lanka
- chairman of the Vocational Council of Sri Lanka
- chairman of the Fair Trading Commission
- consultant to the Human Rights Commission of Sri Lanka

== Family ==
Sanath is the eldest son from 8 siblings who were born to Don Johannes Rathnayake Weerakoon and Dona Rosalind Moonesinghe.

Sanath's Grandparents were Don Nicholas Rathnayake Weerakoon & Dona Abeysekeara Pathiranalage Gimara.

Sanath Weerakoon married Asoka Palihena in 1972 and they have three children: Thushani, Dushan and Janake.

Government offices
Preceded by {{{before}}}	Government Agent of Colombo District; 1990 – 1999	Succeeded by {{{after}}}
