= Sujatha Vidyalaya =

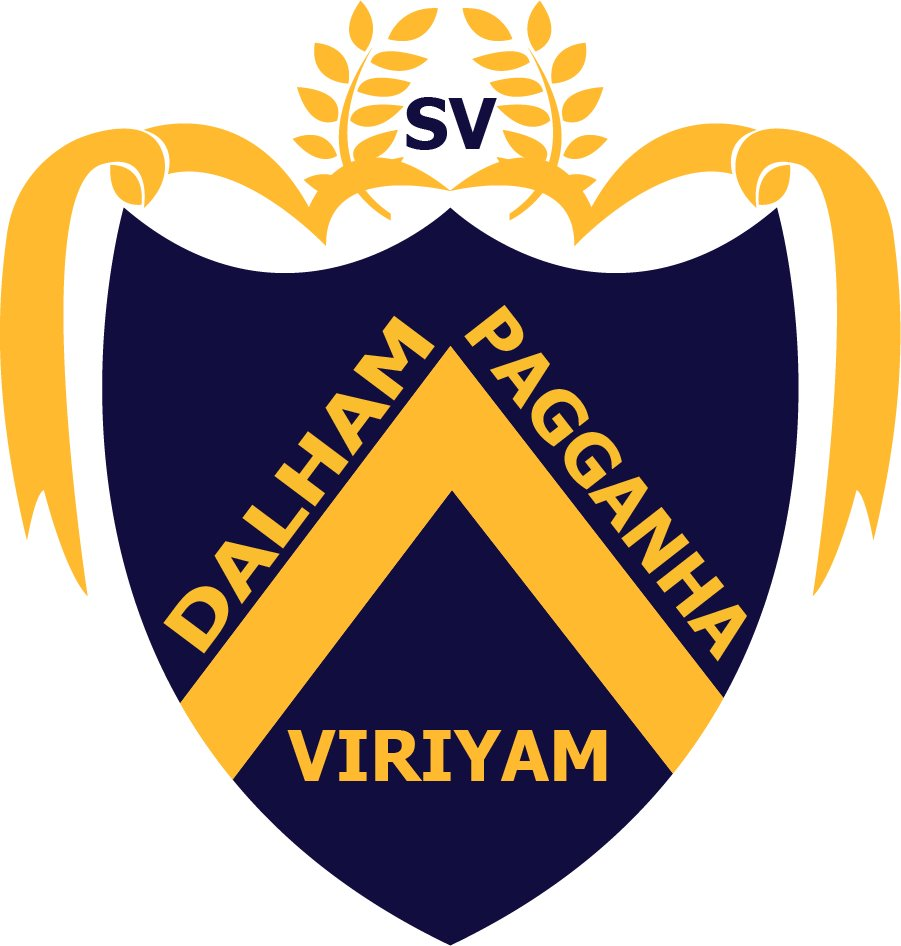

Location
- Rahula Road; Matara; Sri Lanka

Information
- Type: All-Girls government school, started as a private Buddhist
- Motto: Dalham Pagganha Weeryam (Pali for “Try Hard”)
- Religious affiliation: buddhist
- Established: 1929
- Principal: Hemanthimala Wanigasinghe
- Staff: 250
- Grades: 1–13
- Gender: Girls
- Age range: 6 to 19
- Enrollment: 5,000
- Language: Sinhala , English
- Colors: Blue and gold
- Affiliation: Matara Buddhists' Society (1929)
- Website: sujathavidyalaya.org

Sujatha Vidyalaya is a girls' school in Matara, Sri Lanka. The Matara Buddhist Society founded the school as a private Buddhist institution in 1929. It was the first Buddhist girls' school in Matara. Today, the Government of Sri Lanka operates Sujatha Vidyalaya as a national school; it was one of the initial group of schools to receive this designation.

In the beginning, Sujatha Vidyalaya was a small school. In the seventy years since its inception, it has become one of the leading girls' schools in the south of the country.

== History ==
There was a large population of Buddhists in Matara at the beginning of the 20th century. The Matara Buddhist Society took the main role in providing English medium education. Vilmot P. Wijethunga, co-secretary of the society, advocated for the establishment of an English education institute. Dr. V. D. Gunarathna, president of the Matara Buddhist Society, the led movement for a school.

On Poya day in May 1929, the school was inaugurated with Gunarathna as its director. Sujatha Vidyalaya was the first Buddhist girls' school in Matara. The school opened with four teachers who were all Buddhists. Mrs. A. E. Mathives came from India to be the school's principal.

Doreen Young, who was later to marry Communist leader S. A. Wickremasinghe, became the school's principal in 1930. She was responsible for young women from Buddhist Theosophical schools joining the anti-imperialist and socialist movements.

After the death of Gunarwardana, the school experienced some instability, especially as the Matara Buddhist Society was disrupted during World War II. C. A. Ariyarathna became the school's principal and personally paid the teacher's salaries.

The members of the Matara Buddhist Society who took the main role in continuing the school include:

- E. T. Gunawardana
- W. P. Vijethunga
- M. D. T. Kulathilaka
- D. N. J. Weerasooriya
- T. F. D. Abegunawardhana
- C. A. Ariyarathna
- W. P. A. Wickramasinghe
- Jorge Weerathunga
- A. Dayarathna

In 1958, Sujatha Vidyalaya became a government school.

== Campus ==
Originally, the school was located on land owned by Gunarathna that was formerly part of a coconut plantation, at the junctions bordered by the Hakmana Road leading to Veragampita. The secondary school included an office, three upper school classrooms, a small hall, a hostel for the senior girls, and a hostel for the juniors. There were two semi-permanent structures used for the primary section. These buildings had cement floors, walls made from planks, and roofs thatched with cadjan. There was no water on tap, so a broad was created in the back for washing purposes.

In 1936, land and an existing house in Gabadaweediya were converted into a new school facility.

== Student population ==
When Sujatha Vidyalaya opened with 36 students; all were Buddhists. In addition to its female students, the school admitted boys under the age of ten years old. The girls wore a white uniform with a blue and gold tie pinned at the collar and white shoes. The boys wore navy blue shorts, white shirts, and white shoes.

By 1936, the student population had increased beyond the capacity of its buildings. Once the campus increased in size, the student population steadily increased from class to class. As of 2023, the school has some 5,000 students.

== Faculty ==
The faculty includes 188 teachers. There are also 35 non-academic staff. Hemanthimala Wanigasinghe is the current principal of Sujatha Vidyalaya, replacing W. A. Nandawathi in 2010.

Past principals include:

	Name	Dates
1	Mrs. A. E. Mathives	1929–1930
2	Doreen Young	1930–1932
3	Mrs. C. Amirthalingam	1932–193x ?
4	Mrs. Comalan Crain	193x ?–1937
5	Mrs. F. D.Lovel Hestings	1937–1938
6	Mrs. M. M. Perera	1938–1942
7	Mrs. R. Balasooriya	1942–1968
8	Mrs. L. Wedahitha	1965–1975
9	Mrs. Windser	1976
10	Mrs. D. P. T. Dharmasiri	1977–1989
11	Mrs. M. I. Weerathunga	1989–1993
12	Mrs. R. N. Amarasinha	1994–2000
13	Mrs. D. Bambarawana	2000–2002
14	Mrs. C. H. Pinidiya	2000–2005
15	Mrs. W. A. Nandawathi	2008–2010
16	Hemanthimala Wanigasingha	2010–present

== Academics ==
Originally, the school day was conducted in two sessions, with a lunch break of 45 minutes. Lessons were taught in English, using textbooks were imported from England. Reading and Thinking was the reader used in the primary section. In addition to the standard curriculum, students learned the Sinhala language, music, dancing, and drama. Almost every term ending was marked by a concert presented by the students.

In 1945, Sujatha Vidyalaya joined all schools in Sri Lanka in teaching lessons in vernacular languages. Today, the school is divided into primary and secondary sections. Sujatha Vidyalaya Primary serves students from grades 1 to 5, while Sujatha Vidyalaya Secondary accommodates students from grades 6 to 13.

== Student activities ==
Students participate in national and international chess competitions. They also compete in the Brain Busters quiz program. Student athletes compete in netball, badminton, and track.

== Affiliated institutions ==
=== Sujatha Dhamma School ===
Sujatha Dhamma School was started in 1995 by principal Mrs. R. Gunawikcrema. It has around 400 students and fourteen teachers Godawela Pamarathana Thera is the school's principal.

=== Sujatha Primary ===
Sujatha Primary is located in Welegoda. It was established in 1991 where the former Sudarshana Model School was. It includes grades 1 to grade 5 and about 1,500 students with 42 teachers. Samarasinghe is the school's principal.

== Notable alumni ==
- Susila Kottage, actress

== See also ==
- Rahula College
- Education in Sri Lanka
