= Asoka Abeygunawardana =

Sri Lankan engineer

Chairman / CEO Strategic Enterprise Management Agency (SEMA)

Executive Director of the Energy Forum of Sri Lanka

Consultant to the Ministry of Power and Energy

Consultant to the Ministry of Research and Technology

Personal details
- Born: 12 December 1963 (age 62)
- Spouse: Wijayanthi
- Children: Amaya (daughter)
- Parent(s): Henry Dias (father); Lakshmi Rani (mother)
- Education: St. Aloysius' College Galle; Rahula College Matara; D. S. Senanayake College, University of Moratuwa

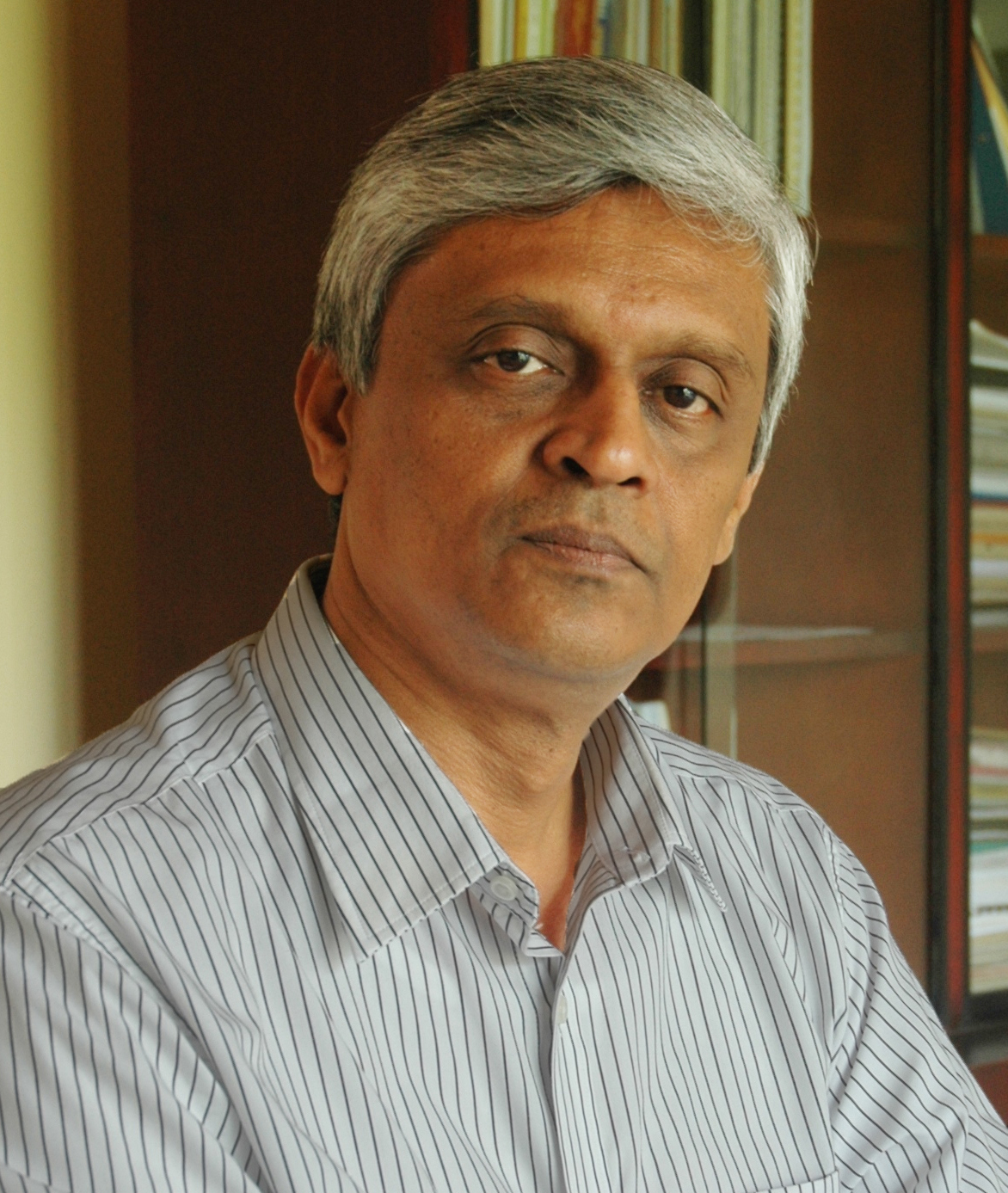

Asoka Nalanda Abeygunawardana (born 12 December 1963) (known as Asoka Abeygunawardana) is a Sri Lankan electrical engineer, environmentalist, social activist and the current Chairman / CEO of the Strategic Enterprise Management Agency at Presidential Secretariat, Sri Lanka.

== Early life ==
He was born on 12 December 1963 in to a Sri Lankan political family. Asoka was the eldest son of Henry Dias Abeygunawardana (the first member of parliament Matara electorate in 1948) and his mother was Lakshmi Rani. He has two sisters Deepika & Renuka.

== Education ==
Abeygunawardana completed his primary and secondary education at St. Aloysius' College Galle, Rahula College Matara and D. S. Senanayake College, Colombo. He then pursued further studies at the University of Moratuwa, where he earned a Bachelor of Science in Electrical Engineering.

== Professional career ==
He had also served as the Adviser to the Minister of Technology and Research and Adviser to the Minister of Power and Energy, Director Sri Lanka Sustainable Energy Authority, Director Sri Lanka Energies, Executive Director Energy Forum (Guarantee) Limited.

== Bibliography ==
- The Revolution of the Era
- A world without Coal or Oil - published in 2008
- Feed-in-tariff in Sri Lanka 2012
- Future Challenges of Electricity Planning
- Gliricidia- Fourth Plantation Crop of Sri Lanka
- Feed in tariff in Sri Lanka

== Family ==
He is married to Wijayanthi Abeygunawardana and have one daughter Amaya.
