= P. B. Jayasundera =

Sri Lankan economist

P. B. Jayasundara

Secretary to the President
- In office 18 November 2019 – 15 January 2022
- President: Gotabaya Rajapaksa
- Preceded by: Udaya Senavirathna

Secretary to the Treasury and Ministry of Finance
- In office 1999–2001
- President: Chandrika Kumaratunga
- Minister: Mahinda Rajapaksa
- In office 2004–2015
- President: Mahinda Rajapaksa
- Minister: Mahinda Rajapaksa

Personal details
- Education: University of Sri Lanka; Williams College; Maliyadeva College

Punchi Banda Jayasundara is a Sri Lankan economist. He was the former Secretary to the President, Gotabaya Rajapaksa and former Secretary of the Treasury on multiple occasions.

== Education ==
He was a past pupil of Maliyadeva College in Kurunegala and Jayasundera was graduated from University of Sri Lanka, Colombo in 1973 with a BA in Economics, he also gained Masters in Development Economics from Williams College in 1980 and a PhD in economics from Boston University in 1984.

== Career ==
=== Central Bank ===
He joined the Central Bank of Sri Lanka as an economist in 1974 and was later promoted to the senior economist in the 1980s following his postgraduate studies in the United States.

=== Ministry of Finance ===
In 1990, he was seconded to the Treasury (Ministry of Finance) as an Economic Advisor in 1990 on secondment. In 1995 he was appointed as Director-General, Department of Fiscal Policy and Economic Affairs in the Ministry of Finance and from 1997 to 1999 he served as the Deputy Secretary to the Treasury. He served as Secretary to the Treasury and the Ministry of Finance from 1999 to 2001, during which Sri Lanka experienced its first recession since gaining its independence in 1948. He then served as chairman, Public Enterprises Reform Commission, Senior Policy Advisor, Ernst & Young Sri Lanka, and as a consultant to the IMF and the World Bank in Sri Lankan assignments. Jayasundera was reappointed as Secretary to the Treasury and Ministry of Finance in 2004.

=== Removal from public office ===
In 2008, he was found guilty by the Supreme Court of Sri Lanka of a violation of procedure in the awarding of a large contract for the expansion of the Port of Colombo. The court barred him from holding any public office. As a result, he resigned from all public offices he held at the time.

In 2009, on invitation by then President Mahinda Rajapaksa to P.B. Jayasundera to once again take up the post of treasury secretary, he submitted a fundamental rights petition protesting the original decision to the Supreme Court, which was heard by the newly appointed Chief Judge who overturned the previous decision and allowed Jayasundera to be reinstated as secretary of the treasury.

=== Flight ===
On the day before the 2015 presidential election, at which Mahinda Rajapaksa was defeated, Jayasundera left the country to Singapore. He was replaced the day after the election by Dr. R H S Samaratunga as secretary of the treasury.

=== Secretary to the President ===
Following the election of Mahinda Rajapaksa's brother President Gotabaya Rajapaksa, Jayasundera was appointed Secretary to the President on 19 November 2019. He gave his resignation in December 2021, and was asked to leave on 15 January 2022 by President Gotabaya Rajapaksa following a long dispute between Jayasundera and the Cabinet of Ministers, who disliked his level of power and influence, with the ministers blaming Jayasundera over the 2019–present Sri Lankan economic crisis. He along with former Treasury Secretary Attigala and former CBSL Governor Ajith Nivard Cabraal were later accused by Finance Minister Ali Sabry of preventing the Sri Lankan Government from approaching the IMF for a bailout in favor of a home grown solution which ultimately forced Sri Lanka into a preemptive sovereign default.

=== Conviction of economic mismanagement ===
Jayasundera along with the Rajapakasha brothers and others were found guilty of economic mismanagement between 2019 and 2022 by the Supreme Court of Sri Lanka which stated on 14 November 2023 that the respondents have breached the fundamental rights to equal protection of the law in terms of Article 12(1) of the Constitution in a fundamental rights petition filed by filed by Transparency International Sri Lanka (TISL) and other four activists.

== See also ==
- List of Sri Lankan non-career Permanent Secretaries
