= Development Lotteries Board =

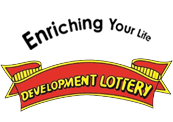
- Company type: Government-owned corporation
- Industry: Gambling
- Founded: January 19, 1983; 42 years ago
- Founder: J. R. Jayewardene
- Headquarters: No 356, Dr Colvin R de Silva Mawatha, Colombo 02.
- Area served: Sri Lanka
- Key people: Amitha Gamage (Chairman)
- Products: Lottery
- Owner: Ministry of Finance
- Parent: President's Fund Trust
- Website: www.dlb.lk

Development Lotteries Board also known DLB is the Sri Lanka government national lottery company. stated in 1983. In 1980s Lotteries Board established with the investment of Rs. 2.2 million (Rs. 260 million in 2020). Half of money donated President's Fund. Early project advised by former President J. R. Jayawardana. In 2019 President's Fund worth rise Rs. 2.668 billion. In 2020 Government DLB budget reduce 5% because post COVID-19 impact in Sri Lanka economy. Previously President's Fund used health department. DLB announced they lunch digital and downloadable lottery app. Lottery called "Sasiri". Highest jackpot winners shared a prize of Rs. more than 50 million. DLB operated 7 lottery.

== Games ==
Several games operate under the DLB brand:

=== Lagnawasana ===
Players buy tickets with their choice of four different numbers and one zodiac sign. The entry fee to the Lotto draw was set at Rs. 20 per board from its introduction. Lagnawasana bigger jackpots with an estimated average more than Rs. 2 million in 2020.

Match	Prize (Rs.)	Odds of winning	Number of winners
4 Numbers + Zodiac Sign	3,675,551	1	0
4 Numbers	500,000	1 in 3	1
3 Numbers +Zodiac Sign	10,000	1 in 100	31
3 Numbers	1,000	1 in 500	352
2 Numbers + Zodiac Sign	200	1 in 1,500	1,370
2 Numbers	100	1 in 20,000	15,089
1 Number + Zodiac Sign	60	1 in 20,000	17,296
1 Number	20	1 in 200,000	188,904
Zodiac Sign	20	1 in 100,000	58,975
