= P. G. Punchihewa =

P. G Punchihewa
- Born: Pannadasa Gardiye Punchihewa; 1 November 1935 (age 90); Mirissa, Sri Lanka

Dr. Pannadasa Gardiye Punchihewa, C.C.S (b. Mirissa, Sri Lanka, 1 November 1935) is a Sri Lankan author and an international civil servant.

== Early life ==
Pannadasa Gardiye Punchihewa was born in 1935 in the southern village of Mirissa in Sri Lanka.

== Education ==
After being selected at the fifth standard scholarship examination he got admitted to the Central College, Telijjawila and passed his Senior School Certificate Examination in first division. He then joined Ananda College, Colombo and gained admission to the University of Ceylon in 1955. He passed out with a bachelor's degree with a second class (upper division), taught for a short while at Ananda College and the University. In 1960 he joined the Ceylon Civil Service. He also has a Diploma on Rural Social Development from the University of Reading UK and has obtained his Doctorate in Philosophy from the University of Sri Jayawardena pura, Sri Lanka.

== Civil Service ==
Ceylon Civil Service
He commenced his public service as a cadet at the Galle Kachcheri and his first appointment was as an Assistant Controller of General Treasury. His subsequent appointments were as Government Agent of Moneragala District, Puttlam District, Kalutara District, Additional Secretary of Ministry of Plantation Industries, and Secretary of Ministry of Coconut Industries. He also held the posts of Chairman Coconut Cultivation Board and Chairman Coconut Development Authority.
International Civil Service
In 1985 he was elected to the post of Executive Director, Asian and Pacific Coconut Community (A.P.C.C), an Intergovernmental Organization based in Jakarta. He was re-elected three times and continued in that position until 2000.
After retiring from APCC and returning to Sri Lanka he served as a consultant to the UNDP (Colombo) and Government of Sri Lanka.

== Publications ==
He has more than thirty publications to his credit published in English and Sinhalese which include research works, fiction, memoirs, translations and children’s books. Among the children’s books is his Mahi Pancha series consisting of six books about a little fly. He won the State Literary Award by the Government of Sri Lanka twice, for the best translation (2008) and the best children’s book (2002).
Children’s Books:

1. Punchihewa, P. G. (2001). Podi Hamududuruwo Saha Thawath Katha. M. D. Gunasena and Company.(State Literary Award 2002)
2. Punchihewa, P. G. (2001). Eta Banda Wewa Saha Wenath Katha. M.D. Gunasena.
3. Mahi Pancha series: A series of children’s stories around a mischievous, inquisitive and intelligent little fly whom the author named Mahi Pancha. To date has five books in English and five in Sinhalese with each having three or four stories. The other titles include Mahi Pancha and his friends, Mahi Pancha and the fireflies, Mahi Pancha and Ali Pancha, Mahi Pancha becomes king, Mahi Panchai Mahi Panchiyi and Mahi Rajata tagi boga.

Illustrations are by Sybil Wettasingha
Translations:

1. Heyerdahl, Thor (1981). Kontiki Expedition. Marga Publications.
2. Pramoedya Anatha Toer (2002). The Fugitive. M. D. Gunasena and Company.
3. Anak Agung Pandji Tisna (2004). The Rape of Sukreni. Dayawansa Jayakody and Company.
4. Ganabol Polowa by PG Punchihewa into English Published by Stamford Lake Publications 2008

Fiction:

1. Punchihewa, P. G. (1997). Piyek Saha Puthek. M. D. Gunasena.
2. Punchihewa, P. G. (2000). Ganabol Polawa. M. D. Gunasena.
3. Punchihewa, P. G. (2008). The Shattered Earth. Stamford Lake Publications.

Research:

1. Punchihewa, P. G. (1979). Gama Saha Viparinamaya. Marga Publications.
2. Punchihewa, P. G. (2012). King Dutugamunu, The Commander-in-Chief. Stamford Lake Publications.
3. Punchihewa, P. G. (1994). The Role of the Coconut Industry in Rural Development, A Comparative Study: Indonesia, The Philippines and Sri Lanka. University of Sri Jayawardenapura.
4. Punchihewa, P. G. (2000). The Cocomunity, from the desk of the Executive Director. Asia Pacific Coconut Community Publications.

Memoirs:

1. Punchihewa, P. G. (2007). Those were the Days. Vijitha Yapa.
2. Punchihewa, P. G. (2008). Avidda Paya. Stamford Lake Publications.

== Family ==
He is married to Anoma Punchihewa (née de Silva ) and they have two children.
