= Abraham Mendis Gunasekera =

Sri Lankan writer

Gate Mudaliyar Abraham Mendis Gunasekera (1869–1931) was a leading literary figure in Ceylon. He had served as an Interpreter Mudaliyar to the Registrar General of Ceylon. Gunasekera produced a Sinhalese grammar as well as Sinhalese-English and English-Sinhalese dictionaries. He is the grandfather of the famous Sri Lankan construction engineer U.N. Gunasekera.

== Sources ==
- A. Mendis Gunasekera: "A Comprehensive Grammar of the Sinhalese Language", 1891 (first edition), reprinted 1962, Sri Lanka Sahitya Mandalaya Colombo.
- Dharmadāsa, Kē. En. Ō (1992). Language, Religion, and Ethnic Assertiveness. ISBN 978-0-472-10288-4.
