= Valentine Gunasekara =

Sri Lankan architect

- Born: 31 January 1931
- Died: 4 September 2017 (aged 86)
- Occupation: Architect

Valentine Gunasekara (31 January 1931 - 2017) was a Sri Lankan architect. He became influential in his country's architecture history in the post-independent period.

== Early life ==
Valentine Gunasekara was born to an elite Catholic family in colonial Ceylon. His father, Danny Gunasekara was a landed proprietor who had lost his wealth in the Great Depression of the 1920s. He died when Valentine was 2½ years old, and Valentine's mother had to raise a family of eight children on her own.

Valentine Gunasekara was educated at the Royal College Colombo, a school modeled on a Victorian grammar school predominantly attended by the children of the rich and privileged of the Ceylonese society of the time. He studied at the Architectural Association (AA) school in London and became a modernist architect. He had further participated in the course on tropical modernism run by Maxwell Fry at AA Tropical School.

== Career ==
Valentine Gunasekara began his architectural career as a partner in 1959 alongside the Sri Lankan architect Geoffrey Bawa in Edward, Reid and Begg (ER&B). In 1965, he won a Rockefeller grant and spent the whole of the following year touring the United States and personally meeting famous American architects such as Louis Kahn, Kevin Roche, Charles Eames, Richard Neutra, Paul Rudolph, Phillip Johnson, and Kevin Roche. He then set the goal to create a new architectural style for his country based on Modernism, thus becoming one of the country's boldest expressionist modernist architect.

Owing to his conflicts with Geoffrey Bawa at ER&B, he withdrew from the practice in 1969 with eight others and commenced to set out on his own. Christopher de Saram joined his practice from 1969 to 1974. They collaborated on an array of projects, including the Tangalle Bay Beach Hotel in Tangalle, Southern Sri Lanka. Jayati Weerakoon became his lead structural engineer, and the two worked together in numerous complex projects.

In the early 1980s, Valentine Gunasekara worked in Nigeria on government.

He became a teacher in Wentworth College, a small private school in Boston, and later moved away and retired in 2002 in California.

== Style ==
Valentine Gunasekara deployed the novel methods of designing that he had picked up from his working stint in the United States, such as design development through models. He disliked the perpetuation of what he interpreted as elite forms and aesthetics in traditional manorial dwellings and in colonial bungalows. The rigid enclosed building envelope and hipped roofs of public works department housing was the most problematic as well as disturbing for him and he wanted these roofs and ceilings to open out to allow the beauty of the surrounding to fill in the space. Valentine considered that the spatial progression of a building at the boundary, where inside meets outside, is something that has to be more fluid, and this was achieved by raising the canopy or the roof edge up to ensure the outward draw. He also contributed greatly to transforming Roman Catholic chapel architecture for new forms of congregation, and away from axial arrangements as advocated for by the Second Vatican Council.

Valentine Gunasekara's architectural contribution can be understood in three ways: He was in constant quest for new spatial concepts that could be created with the innovative technology and material of the time such as glass and reinforced concrete and was keen to familiarize local masons in handling sophisticated processes so that they could in turn expand their capacity. His portfolio consists of a number of domestic buildings that reinterpreted Modernism for the tropical climate and setting, in particular inspired by examples from southern California. These were done mainly for the emergent middle class of the country and they bear witness to the development of his expressionist aesthetics. This latter group, educated in the new universities that were created during political independence were less accepting of traditional architectural forms which they associated with established elites. Gunasekara's career thus documents their search for an alternative architecture expressive of their aspirations for modernity.

The architecture of Valentine Gunasekara is often compared with Geoffrey Bawa, as the latter is conceived as the antithesis of the former.

== Bibliography ==
- Anoma Pieris (2007). Imagining Modernity: The Architecture of Valentine Gunasekara. Stamford Lake. p. 174. ISBN 9789556580822..

== Private life ==
Valentine Gunasekara married Ranee Jayamanne in 1962, and they had eight children.
