= Ministry of Home Affairs (Sri Lanka) =

Government ministry of Sri Lanka

- ස්වදේශ කටයුතු අමාත්‍යාංශය உள்நாட்டலுவல்கள் அமைச்சு

Ministry overview
- Formed: 1931; 95 years ago
- Jurisdiction: Democratic Socialist Republic of Sri Lanka
- Headquarters: Independence Square, Colombo 07; 6.903524°N 79.869168°E
- Annual budget: LKR 27 billion (2016, recurrent); LKR 5 billion (2016, capital)
- Minister responsible: Dinesh Gunawardena, Minister of Public Administration, Home Affairs, Provincial Councils and Local Government
- Ministry executive: S. T. Kodikara, Ministry Secretary
- Child agencies: District and divisional secretariats of Sri Lanka; Registrar General's Department
- Website: moha.gov.lk

The Ministry of Home Affairs (Sinhala: ස්වදේශ කටයුතු අමාත්‍යාංශය Swadēsha Katayuthu Amathyanshaya; Tamil: உள்நாட்டலுவல்கள் அமைச்சு) is a cabinet ministry of the Government of Sri Lanka responsible for public administration.

The Minister of Home Affairs is one of the most senior ministers in the government and ranks third in the ministerial ranking. The ministry is responsible for formulating and implementing national policy on home affairs and other subjects which come under its purview. The ministry manages the country's administrative service, including District and Divisional Secretariats as well as the Grama Niladhari (village officers) network under the oversight of the latter.

The current Minister of Home Affairs is Prime Minister Dinesh Gunawardena.

== Ministers ==
Ministers of Home Affairs
Name	Portrait	Party	Took office	Left office	Head of government	Ministerial title	Refs
Don Baron Jayatilaka			1931	1942		Minister of Home Affairs	
Arunachalam Mahadeva			1942	1946		Minister of Home Affairs	
Oliver Goonetilleke			26 September 1947		D. S. Senanayake	Minister of Home Affairs and Rural Development	
Edwin Wijeyeratne			1948	1951	D. S. Senanayake	Minister of Home Affairs and Rural Development	
Oliver Goonetilleke			1952		Dudley Senanayake	Minister of Home Affairs and Rural Development	
A. Ratnayake					Dudley Senanayake	Minister of Home Affairs	
A. Ratnayake			1953		John Kotelawala	Minister of Home Affairs	
A. P. Jayasuriya			12 April 1956	June 1959	S. W. R. D. Bandaranaike	Minister of Home Affairs	
T. B. Ilangaratne		Sri Lanka Freedom Party	26 September 1959	8 December 1959	W. Dahanayake	Minister of Home Affairs	
M. C. M. Kaleel		United National Party	23 March 1960	1960	Dudley Senanayake	Minister of Home Affairs and Rural Development	
Maithripala Senanayake		Sri Lanka Freedom Party	23 July 1960		Sirimavo Bandaranaike	Minister of Industries, Home and Cultural Affairs	
W. Dahanayake		Sri Lanka Freedom Socialist Party	March 1965		Dudley Senanayake	Minister of Home Affairs	
Felix Dias Bandaranaike		Sri Lanka Freedom Party	31 May 1970		Sirimavo Bandaranaike	Minister of Public Administration, Local Government and Home Affairs	
T. B. Ilangaratne		Sri Lanka Freedom Party			Sirimavo Bandaranaike	Minister of Public Administration and Home Affairs	
Montague Jayawickrama		United National Party	23 July 1977		J. R. Jayewardene	Minister of Public Administration and Home Affairs	
K. W. Devanayakam		United National Party	14 February 1980		J. R. Jayewardene	Minister of Home Affairs	
Festus Perera		United National Party	1990		Ranasinghe Premadasa	Minister of Public Administration, Provincial Councils and Home Affairs	
Amarasiri Dodangoda		Sri Lanka Freedom Party	1994		D. B. Wijetunga	Minister of Home Affairs, Local Government and Co-operatives	
Richard Pathirana		Sri Lanka Freedom Party	19 October 2000	14 September 2001	Chandrika Kumaratunga	Minister of Public Administration, Home Affairs and Administrative Reforms	
Richard Pathirana		Sri Lanka Freedom Party	14 September 2001		Chandrika Kumaratunga	Minister of Public Administration, Home Affairs, Provincial Councils, Local Government and Southern Development	
Alick Aluvihare		United National Party	12 December 2001		Chandrika Kumaratunga	Minister of Home Affairs and Local Government	
Amarasiri Dodangoda		Sri Lanka Freedom Party	10 April 2004		Chandrika Kumaratunga	Minister of Public Administration and Home Affairs	
Sarath Amunugama		Sri Lanka Freedom Party	23 November 2005		Mahinda Rajapaksa	Minister of Public Administration and Home Affairs	
Karu Jayasuriya		United National Party	28 January 2007	9 December 2008	Mahinda Rajapaksa	Minister of Public Administration and Home Affairs	
Sarath Amunugama		Sri Lanka Freedom Party	1 January 2009		Mahinda Rajapaksa	Minister of Public Administration and Home Affairs	
John Seneviratne		Sri Lanka Freedom Party	23 April 2010		Mahinda Rajapaksa	Minister of Public Administration and Home Affairs	
M. Joseph Michael Perera		United National Party	12 January 2015	22 March 2015	Maithripala Sirisena	Minister of Home Affairs and Fisheries	
M. Joseph Michael Perera		United National Party	22 March 2015	17 August 2015	Maithripala Sirisena	Minister of Home Affairs	
Vajira Abeywardena		United National Party	4 September 2015	21 November 2019	Maithripala Sirisena	Minister of Home Affairs	
Janaka Bandara Tennakoon		Sri Lanka Podujana Peramuna	22 November 2019	3 April 2022	Gotabaya Rajapaksa	Minister of Public Administration, Home Affairs, Provincial Councils and Local Government	
Dinesh Gunawardena		Mahajana Eksath Peramuna	18 April 2022	Incumbent	Gotabaya Rajapaksa	Minister of Public Administration, Home Affairs, Provincial Councils and Local Government	

== Secretaries ==
Home Affairs Secretaries
Name	Took office	Left office	Title	Refs
D. Dissanayake	25 April 2010		Public Administration and Home Affairs Secretary	
P. B. Abeykoon	22 November 2010		Public Administration and Home Affairs Secretary	
S. D. A. B. Borelessa	19 January 2015		Home Affairs and Fisheries Secretary	
J. J. Rathnasiri	8 September 2015	31 July 2016	Home Affairs Secretary	
Neil De Alwis	4 September 2016		Home Affairs Secretary	
S. T. Kodikara	17 April 2018		Home Affairs Secretary	
