= Lalith Weeratunga =

Lalith Weerathunga
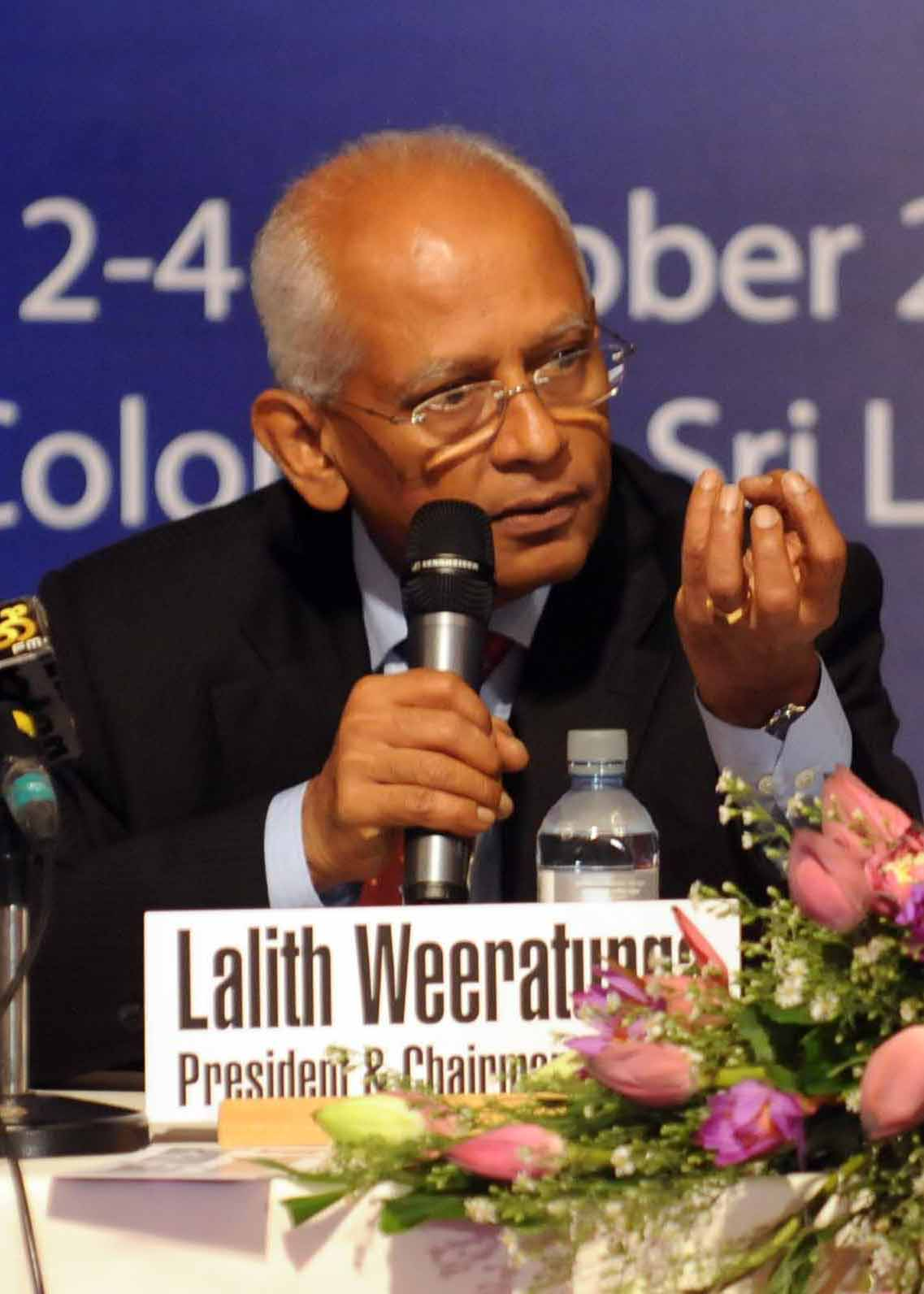

Secretary to the President of Sri Lanka
- In office November 2005 – January 2015
- President: Mahinda Rajapaksa

Secretary to the Prime Minister of Sri Lanka
- In office April 2004 – November 2005
- Prime Minister: Mahinda Rajapaksa

Personal details
- Born: 14 May 1950 (age 76)
- Spouse: Indrani Sugathadasa Weeratunga
- Children: Geethendra, Vindhya
- Education: Rahula College; Royal College; University of Colombo; Pennsylvania State University
- Profession: Civil Servant

Lalith Chandrakumar Weeratunga (Sinhala: ලලිත් වීරතුංග Tamil: லலித் வீரதூங்க) (known as Lalith Weeratunga), (born 14 May 1950) SLAS, is the former Permanent Secretary to the President of Sri Lanka (also known as the President's Secretary). As the President's Secretary he was the top civil servant in the country and de facto head of the Sri Lanka Administrative Service. Prior to the appointment he was the Secretary to the Prime Minister of Sri Lanka.

He was the Senior Advisor to the President of Sri Lanka (From 2019 to July 2022).

== Education ==
Weeratunga received his primary education at Rahula College, Matara before moving to Royal College Colombo for his secondary education. Mr Weeratunga holds a master's degree in Business Administration from the University of Colombo and a bachelor's degree in Natural Sciences from the same university. later attended Pennsylvania State University for postgraduate studies. He is a Hubert H. Humphrey Fellow of the Pennsylvania State University, United States.

== Career ==
Lalith Weeratunga, Secretary to President of Sri Lanka, assumed this position in November 2005 when Mahinda Rajapaksa was elected the President of the Democratic Socialist Republic of Sri Lanka. Prior to this, Mr Weeratunga held the position of Secretary to the Prime Minister from April 2004. Formerly, he was the Director, Re-engineering Government in the Information & Communication Technology Agency of Sri Lanka. He has also been a Senior Consultant at the Postgraduate Institute of Management (PIM) of the University of Sri Jayewardenepura, teaching both the Masters in Business Administration and Masters in Public Administration programmes.

Weeratunga entered the Sri Lanka Administrative Service (SLAS) in January 1977 and has held a number of senior positions in the public service as Secretary to the Prime Minister, Additional Secretary, Prime Minister's Office, Additional Secretary, Ministry of Education & Higher Education, Director General, Tertiary & Vocational Education Commission, Vice Chairman, National Apprenticeship Board, and Senior Assistant Secretary, Ministry of Youth Affairs & Sports. In the early part of his career, he was an Assistant Government Agent.

He had also been Chief Technical Advisor/Vocational Training Specialist in the Regional Office of the International Labour Organization (ILO) for Asia & Pacific, Thailand and had worked as a Consultant of the United Nations Development Programme for the Government of Maldives. In addition, he has done several consultancies for the ILO.

Indrani Sugathadasa Weeratunga (wife of Lalith Weeratunga)

Weeratunga is the Chairman of the Telecommunication Regulatory Commission of Sri Lanka and in addition, chairs the Presidential Task Force for National Productivity and the National Administrative Reforms Council. Throughout his career, he has served many Task Forces, Committees and Governing Councils of universities and Boards of directors of Public Corporations and Statutory Boards.

He is also the current Chair of the Information and Communication Technology (ICT) Committee of ESCAP – the Economic & Social Commission for Asia and the Pacific.

In September 2010, Weeratunga was unanimously elected as the Chairman of the Commonwealth Telecommunications Organisation at its 50th Council Meeting.

== Corruption Charges ==
Weeratunga with Anusha Pelpita was acquitted from a case charging them with misappropriation of Government funds by distributing ‘Sil’ cloth to temples island-wide at a cost of Rs. 600 million belonging to the Telecommunications Regulatory Commission during the 2015 Presidential Election. Judge Wickremasinghe of 2-member Appeals Court pointed out that the three indictments filed against the accused in connection with the misappropriation of funds had not been proved beyond reasonable doubt, and ordered that the accused be acquitted and released.

== Family ==
He is married to Indrani Sugathadasa Weeratunga.

== See also ==
- Notable members of the SLAS
