= Sarath Amunugama (politician) =

Sri Lankan politician

Sarath Amunugama SLAS
- සරත් ලීලානන්ද බණඩාර අමුනුගම சரத் லீலானந்த பண்டார அமுனுகம
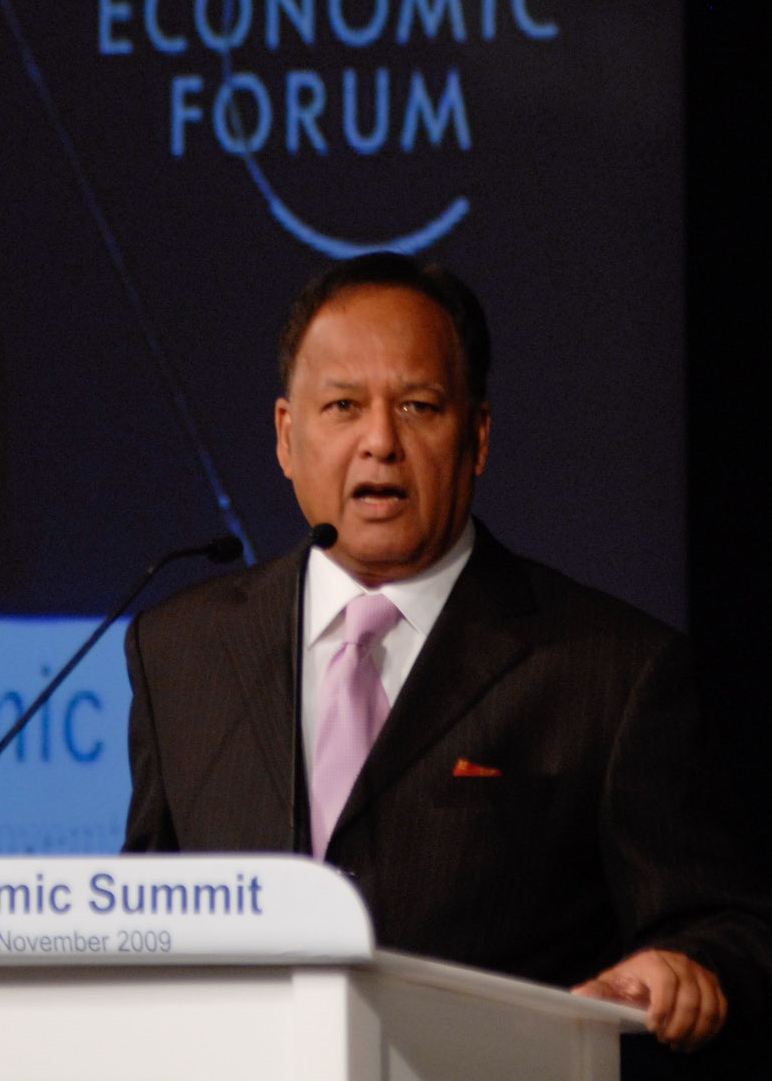

Minister for Special Projects
- In office 23 October 2015 – 26 October 2018
- President: Maithripala Sirisena
- Prime Minister: Ranil Wickremesinghe

Minister of Irrigation & Water Resources Management
- In office 2000–2001
- President: Chandrika Kumaratunga
- Prime Minister: Ratnasiri Wickremanayake

Minister of Finance
- In office 14 April 2004 – 22 November 2005
- President: Chandrika Kumaratunga
- Prime Minister: Mahinda Rajapaksa
- Preceded by: K. N. Choksy
- Succeeded by: Mahinda Rajapaksa

Minister of Public Administration & Home Affairs
- In office 23 November 2005 – 28 January 2007
- President: Mahinda Rajapaksa
- Prime Minister: Ratnasiri Wickremanayake
- Preceded by: Amarasiri Dodangoda
- Succeeded by: Karu Jayasuriya

Minister Enterprise Development & Investment Promotion
- In office 2007–2010
- President: Mahinda Rajapaksa
- Prime Minister: Ratnasiri Wickremanayake

Deputy Minister of Finance & Planning
- In office 2010 – 12 January 2015
- President: Mahinda Rajapaksa
- Prime Minister: Ratnasiri Wickremanayake
- Minister: Mahinda Rajapaksa

Member of Parliament for National List
- In office 2015–2020

Member of Parliament for Kandy District
- In office 1994–2015

Personal details
- Born: July 10, 1939 (age 86)
- Party: Sri Lanka Freedom Party; United National Party
- Other political affiliations: United People's Freedom Alliance
- Occupation: Civil servant

Sarath Leelananda Bandara Amunugama (Sinhala:සරත් ලීලානන්ද බණඩාර අමුනුගම), MP, SLAS (born July 10, 1939) is a Sri Lankan politician and civil servant. He was the Cabinet Minister of Public Administration and Home Affairs and Deputy Minister of Finance and Planning until April 2010. He is a Member of Parliament from the Kandy District for the United People's Freedom Alliance in the Parliament of Sri Lanka.

He studied at the Trinity College, Kandy and graduated from the University of Ceylon. He joined the Ceylon Civil Service (CCS) in its last intake of cadets in 1962. Following the disestablishment of the CCS he was transferred to its successor the Ceylon Administrative Service which was later renamed as the Sri Lanka Administrative Service (SLAS). During his career in the SLAS he served as Government Agent of the Kandy District, Director of Information, Permanent Secretary to Ministry of Information and Broadcasting and later chairman, The Associated Newspapers of Ceylon Ltd. Before entering active politics he worked as an International Civil Servant for UNESCO headquarters in Paris. He resides in Colombo.

== See also ==
- Cabinet of Sri Lanka
