= A. E. de Silva =

Sri Lankan businessman

Albert Emmanuel de Silva Snr. was a prominent businessman during the late 19th century in Sri Lanka.

== Business ventures ==
He founded and was the sole proprietor of the A.E. de Silva and Co. in the late 19th century, which dealt in every description of Ceylonese produce: principally Plumbago (Graphite), Desiccated Coconut, Fibre, Cacao, Cinnamon and Tea. The main export business was done with the United Kingdom and the continent, through the firm's agents in London, Hamburg and other European ports.

== Wealth ==
Mr. de Silva was the owner of large estates and town properties. He owned over 6000 acres (720,000 perches) of cultivated land 1,700 acres (6.9 km^{2}) in coconuts, 400 acres (1.6 km^{2}) in cinnamon, over 2,000 acres (8.1 km^{2}) in rubber and 200 acres (0.81 km^{2}) in cacao. He owned much property in the Colombo and resided in his mansion 'Stephanotis' on Flower Road, which was later renamed after his son Sir Ernest de Silva. He was one of the richest Sri Lankans of the late 19th century and arguably the richest in the early 20th century.

== Personal life ==
He married the daughter of Emanis Gunasekere who was a successful businessman engaged in exporting. He was the father of the philanthropist Sir Ernest de Silva and therefore the Grandfather-in-law of Construction Magnate Mr. U.N.Gunasekera, making the lineage one of the oldest traditionally wealthy families in the country.
