= Evadne de Silva =

Sri Lankan politician

Senator Evadne, Lady de Silva was one of the first female Senators in Ceylon (present-day Sri Lanka) and a prominent Philanthropist.

She was the daughter of Saranelis D Gunasekara and Eugenie D S Kumarasing. She was married to the Cambridge-educated philanthropist Sir Ernest de Silva. She, together with her husband Sir Ernest, considered to be the wealthiest man in Ceylon, constructed a temple and two major schools in Sri Lanka.

She also founded many orphanages such as the Parakrama Home and Angela Children's Home. Along with Mrs. H.M. Gunasekera, she started the inaugural orphanage in Sri Lanka: 'The Gamini Matha'. Lady de Silva was the inaugural President of the All Ceylon Women's Buddhist Congress.

Such was the great philanthropy of her husband, regarded as Sri Lanka's greatest philanthropist of the 20th Century, that the Former President of Sri Lanka, The Late Hon.R.Premadasa, stated that "if there was a Buddhist Temple or school that He (Sir Ernest) did not help, it was not in Sri Lanka".

Her daughter, Sita, married Construction Magnate Mr. U.N. Gunasekera.
