= Ministry of Finance, Economic Stabilization and National Policies =

Government ministry of Sri Lanka

Ministry of Finance, Planning and Economic Development
- මුදල්, සැලසුම් සහ ආර්ථික සංවර්ධන අමාත්‍යාංශය நிதி, திட்டமிடல் மற்றும் பொருளாதார மேம்பாட்டு அமைச்சகம்

Agency overview
- Formed: 1947
- Jurisdiction: Government of Sri Lanka
- Headquarters: The Secretariat, Lotus road, Colombo 1; 6.930965°N 79.844187°E
- Minister responsible: Anura Kumara Dissanayake, Minister of Finance, Planning and Economic Development
- Agency executive: Harshana Suriyapperuma, Secretary to the Ministry of Finance
- Child agencies: Bank of Ceylon; Central Bank of Sri Lanka; Credit Information Bureau; Department of Excise; Development Lotteries Board; Employees’ Trust Fund Board; Housing Development Finance Corporation Bank; Imports and Exports Control Department; Inland Revenue Department; Insurance Board of Sri Lanka; Kandurata Development Bank; Lanka Puthra Development Bank; National Development Trust Fund; National Insurance Trust Fund; National Lotteries Board; National Savings Bank; People’s Bank; Public Private Partnership Unit; Rajarata Development Bank; Ruhuna Development Bank; Sabaragamuwa Development Bank; Securities and Exchange Commission; Sri Lanka Accounting and Auditing Standards Monitoring Board; Sri Lanka Customs; Sri Lanka Savings Bank; State Mortgage & Investment Bank; Uva Development Bank; Valuation Department; Wayamba Development Bank
- Website: www.treasury.gov.lk

The Ministry of Finance, Planning and Economic Development (Sinhala: මුදල්, සැලසුම් සහ ආර්ථික සංවර්ධන අමාත්‍යාංශය; Tamil: நிதி, திட்டமிடல் மற்றும் பொருளாதார மேம்பாட்டு அமைச்சகம்) (also known as the Finance Ministry or the Treasury) is a cabinet ministry of the Government of Sri Lanka responsible for developing and executing the government's public finance policy, economic policy and long term fiscal planning. The Treasury is housed at the General Treasury Building (also referred to as The Secretariat) in Fort.

== History ==
Although the post Treasurer of Ceylon of the British Government of Ceylon dates back to the early nineteenth century and was succeeded by the post of Financial Secretary of Ceylon under the recommendations of the Donoughmore Commission. The post of Ministry of Finance and the Treasury of Ceylon was established in 1947 under the recommendations of the Soulbury Commission under the Ceylon Independence Act, 1947 and The Ceylon (Constitution and Independence) Orders in Council 1947. A young J.R Jayawardena, became the first Minister of Finance of independence Ceylon. Over time the Ministry took over the policy planning which it currently undertakes.

== Senior officials ==
- Minister of Finance, Planning and Economic Development - Anura Kumara Dissanayake
- Secretary to the Treasury - Harshana Suriyapperuma

== Treasury departments ==
- Department of Project Management and Monitoring
- National Planning Department
- External Resources Department
- National Budget Department
- Public Enterprises Department
- Management Services Department
- Fiscal Policy Department
- Trade, Tariff & Investment Policy Department
- Development Finance Department
- Public Finance Department
- Legal Affairs Department
- Treasury Operations Department
- State Accounts Department
- Management Audit Department.
- Information Technology Management Department

== Secretary of the Treasury ==
The position of Secretary to the Treasury is rooted in the post of Financial Secretary of the colonial Government of Ceylon this itself originated from the post of Treasurer of the colonial government. Appointments were made from the members of the British Civil Service and later from the Ceylon Civil Service. It was one of three the key government colonial posts, the others being Colonial Secretary and Law Secretary. The post of Financial Secretary came second in the order precedence after Colonial Secretary or Chief Secretary as the post was known.

Following independence in 1947 and the official post of Secretary of Treasury, with appointment begin of grade of a Permanent Secretary and to the most senior member and head of the Ceylon Civil Service. Most appointments in the recent past have been for persons who have not been the career civil servants and the post is concurrently held with that of Permanent Secretary of the Ministry of Finance.

- Sir Charles Ernest Jones, CMG, CCS (29.09.1947 – 12.12.1950)
- Theodore Duncan Perera, CMG, CCS (13.12.1950 – 12.03.1951)
- Sir Arthur Godwin Ranasinha, CMG, CBE, CCS (12.04.1951 – 13.10.1954)
- Leopold James Seneviratne, CCS (14.10.1954 – 14.08.1956)
- Samson Felix Amarasinghe, OBE, CCS (15.08.1956 – 31.05.1961 )
- Hamilton Shirley Amerasinghe, CCS (01.06.1961 – 10.10.1963)
- H. E. Tennekoone, CCS (11.06.1963 – 18.12.1963)
- H J Samarakkody, CAS (19.12.1963 – 14.11.1968)
- M. Rajendra, CAS (15.11.1968 – 06.05.1971)
- C.A. Coorey, SLAS (17.05.1971 – 01.07.1975)
- Dr. L R Jayewardena (16.07.1975 – 08.03.1978)
- Dr. W M Thilakeratne (28.03.1978 – 04.02.1987)
- B Mahadeva (05.02.1987 – 19.07.1987)
- C Chanmugam (20.07.1987 – 31.12.1988)
- R. Paskaralingam (04.01.1989 – 18.01.1994)
- N V K K Weragoda (19.01.1994 – 18.08.1994)
- A. S. Jayawardene (19.08.1994 – 07.11.1995)
- B C Perera (08.01.1996 – 31.01.1998)
- Dixon Nilaweera, SLAS (16.03.1998 – 01.11.1999)
- Dr. P.B. Jayasundera (01.11.1999 – 18.12.2001)
- J Charitha Ratwatte (19.12.2001 – 02.04.2004)
- Dr. P.B. Jayasundera (19.04.2004 – 17.09.2008)
- S Abeysinghe, SLAS (17.09.2008 – 2009)
- Dr. P.B. Jayasundera (2009 – 2015)
- Dr. R.H.S Samaratunga (2015 – 2019)
- S. R. Attygalle (2019 –2022)
- Mahinda Siriwardana (2022 –2025)
- Harshana Suriyapperuma (2025 –)

== See also ==
- Minister of Finance, Economic Stabilization and National Policies
