= Ernest de Silva =

Ceylonese business magnate, banker, barrister and public figure

Sir Ernest de Silva
- ශ්‍රිමත් අර්නස්ට් ද සිල්වා
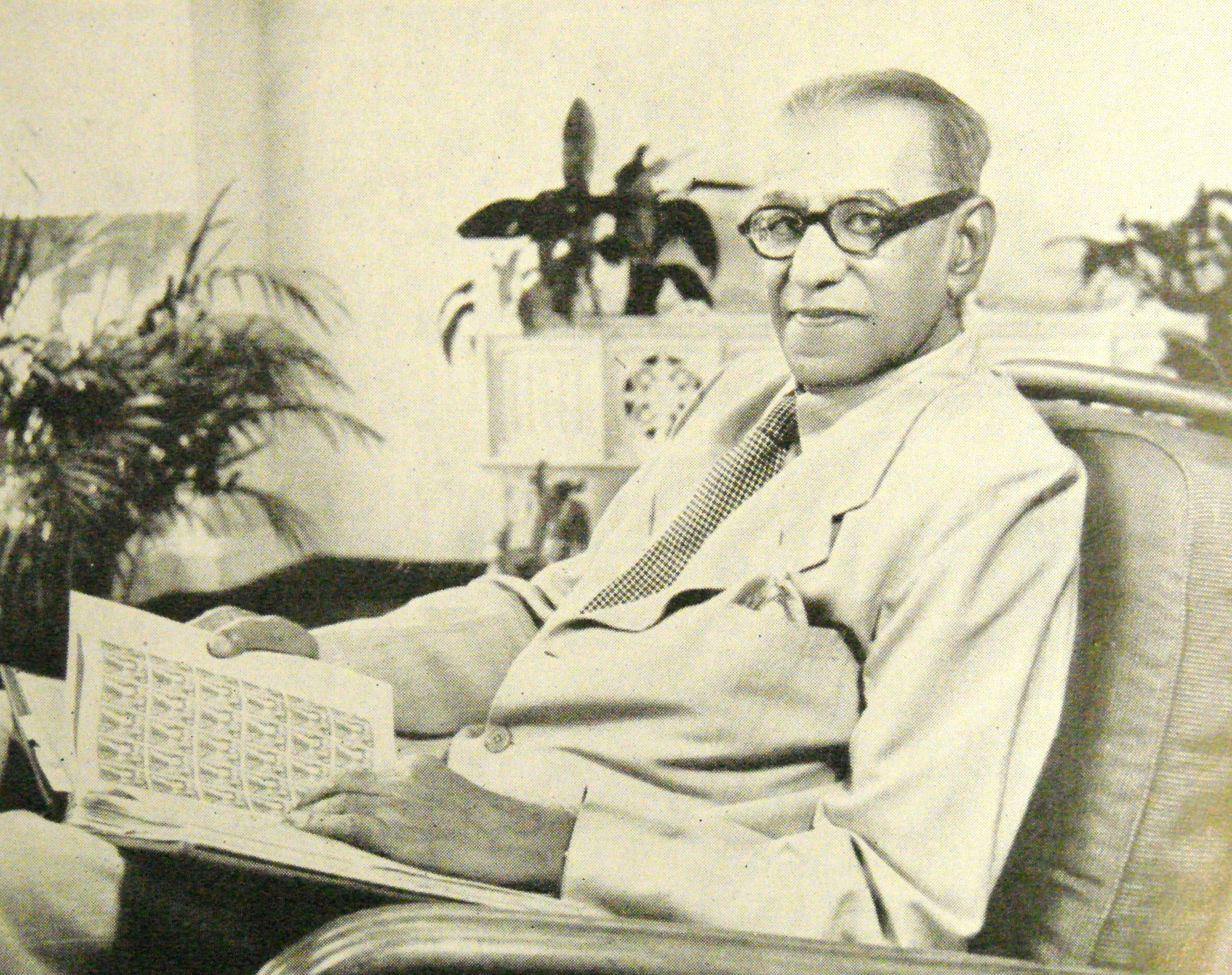
- Born: 26 November 1887; Colombo, British Ceylon
- Died: 9 May 1957 (aged 69); Colombo, Dominion of Ceylon (now Sri Lanka)
- Other name: Sir A.E. de Silva
- Education: Clare College, Cambridge, Royal College, Colombo
- Spouse: Senator Lady Evadne de Silva

Sir Albert Ernest de Silva (Sinhala ශ්‍රිමත් අර්නස්ට් ද සිල්වා; 26 November 1887 – 9 May 1957) was a Ceylonese business magnate, banker, barrister and public figure, considered to be the most prominent Ceylonese philanthropist of the 20th century. A wealthy and influential polymath, he was the founder-chairman of the largest bank in Ceylon (present-day Sri Lanka), the Bank of Ceylon, the founder-governor of the State Mortgage Bank and chairman of the Ceylon All-Party committee. He made many contributions to Ceylonese society and is also considered to be the preeminent philatelist in the history of Ceylon. Upon Ceylon's independence, he was asked to become the first Ceylonese Governor General (representative of the King in Ceylon, i.e. de facto head of state), an honour he declined for personal reasons. De Silva was at the pinnacle of upper-class society and, as the wealthiest Ceylonese of his generation, he defined the island's ruling class. His memorials describe him as highly respected for his integrity and honesty.

== Formative years ==
Sir Ernest de Silva was born to one of the most affluent families in Ceylon. His parents and grandparents were extremely wealthy and owned much land all over the country. His great-grandfather, Emans de Silva Gunasekere and his grandfather, S. D. S. Gunasekere bequeathed the properties to his father, A. E. de Silva, who later became the wealthiest businessman in Ceylon, and named his son Albert Ernest de Silva Jr. The young heir received his education first at Royal College, Colombo, graduated subsequently from Clare College, Cambridge and was called to the bar at the Inner Temple. He was a close friend of Indian Prime Minister Jawaharlal Nehru who was a contemporary of his at Cambridge. They met again in 1930 when Nehru arrived for a visit in Ceylon.

== Marriage and family ==
Sir Ernest de Silva's wife, Evadne who, following his knighthood, became known as Lady Evadne de Silva, was herself a prominent philanthropist and, upon independence, became one of the first women in the Senate of Ceylon. He had six children. One of his daughters, Sita, married Business Magnate U. N. Gunasekera, considered to be Ceylon's most notable and influential civil engineer of the 20th century, having built many of the nation's largest buildings, including its first five star hotels, and a silent philanthropist himself. Another daughter, Swarnapali, married O. R. Medonza who was an Emeritus Consultation Physician at General Hospital (Colombo).

== Philanthropy ==
Sir Ernest de Silva was, arguably, Ceylon's greatest philanthropist of the twentieth century, funding a vast number of charitable endeavours. Among his various projects were the building of four major schools (including Devapathiraja Vidyalaya, Dematagoda Veluvanarama Vidyalaya and Lakshmi College) and providing free education as well as scholarships to its students. Through the Devpathiraja Vidyalaya, Sir Ernest established the inaugural free Buddhist English school in the South, 23 years prior to the establishment of free education in Ceylon and therefore is sometimes referred to as the 'Grandfather of free education' for the conception and successful implementation of the notion. He and his wife, Senator Lady Evadne de Silva, funded the inaugural orphanage in Ceylon in the form of a donation of 9 acres (36,000 m2) in Katunayake.

He went on to establish Ceylon's first tuberculosis sanatorium in Kandana. Sir Ernest also donated a multi-acre cinnamon and coconut estate to cover the expenditure of the organisation. He served as the President of the Ceylon National Association for the Prevention of Tuberculosis (CNAPT). Among Sir Ernest's numerous contributions to health care was the donation of the inaugural Radiology unit inclusive of the first X-ray machine in Ceylon to the National Hospital in memory of his father, A.E. de Silva Snr.

As the founder-chairman of the Bank of Ceylon, he also became the governor of the State Mortgage Bank which was established to provide financial assistance to the island's low-income earners. Among his various philanthropic acts were the establishment of the Angela Children's Home, the Parakrama Home, Children's homes in Negombo, Walana, Biyagama, Kandana and Heenatiyana, a maternity home in Bokanda, a Monastery in Salgala, a hermitage in Rajagiriya in addition to the Welisara Children's hospital and a fully constructed hospital at Wanni Athpaththu Kurunegala. He also supported the establishment of worthy charitable organisations such as the Gamini Matha Elder's home, Mallika Home and Harischandra Vidyalaya. He gave away lands, buildings and funds to numerous orphanages, hospitals, schools, social service bodies, temples and hermitages without fanfare or publicity.

== Faith ==
Sir Ernest de Silva was a strong Buddhist who contributed much to the advancement of Buddhism. One such instance was when he purchased an Island (Polgasduwa) in 1911 and offered it to Ven. Nanatiloke, the famous German monk, to start a hermitage for Buddhist monks. The founder-Preceptor, a reputed German Professor who had been ordained in Burma, attracted many scholars and thinkers from all parts of the world, to name a few, from Germany, France, Holland, Yugoslavia, England and the United States of America in the West to the Far East and went on to play a prominent role in the revitalisation of Buddhism in the world. Sir Ernest was thus instrumental in putting Ceylon on the map of the world of philosophy and religion.

When a great disciple of the German monk, Ven. Nyanaponika, had wanted to disrobe and return to Germany to take his Jewish mother away from the Nazi hostilities, Sir Ernest had used his influence and vouched for his mother and relatives and brought them to Ceylon whereupon some resided in one of his estates.

He also built a temple along with this mother: the Veluvanaramaya. He was the President of the YMBA (Young Men's Buddhist Association) and the Kalutara Bodhi Trust and his wife was the Inaugural President of the Ceylon Women's Buddhist Congress. Ranasinghe Premadasa, who was Ceylon's president from 1989 to 1993, said of him that "if there was a Buddhist Temple or school that he did not help, it was not in Ceylon."

== Wealth ==
Sir Ernest was, in his time, Ceylon's richest man and one of the wealthiest Ceylonese of the twentieth century. He inherited and purchased thousands of acres of tea, rubber and coconut estates as well as land in the prominent areas of Colombo. One such estate was the famed 1200 acre (5 km²) Salawa estate which was used as a rubber plantation. And also Rukkattana estate in Bingiriya was another property of him which was used as a coconut plantation. He owned 46 acres (7360 perches) of land mostly in the Cinnamon Gardens (Colombo 7) which, being one of the most expensive areas in Ceylon, would be worth approximately $600 million in the economy of the 2010s. His company dealt in every description of Ceylonese produce, principally plumbago (graphite), desiccated coconut, fibre, cacao, rubber, cinnamon and tea. The main export business was done with the United Kingdom and the continent, through the firm's agents in London, Hamburg and other European ports. His residence, the "Sirimathipaya Mansion", equipped then with horse stables and tennis courts, now serves as the Prime Minister's office.

== Hobbies ==
Aside from public life, de Silva's central passion was stamp collecting. His Ceylonese collection is said to have been world-class, second only to that of King George V. He was said to be one of the most notable philatelists in the world and also owned the legendary orange-red "Post Office" Mauritius One Penny (1847) stamp; considered to be among the rarest and most expensive stamps in the world. In keeping with his charitable ways, he donated the stamp to his relative, Sir Cyril de Zoysa, for the construction of the YMBA headquarters building. Subsequently, the stamp brought $1.1 million at an auction in 1993.

Sir A. E. de Silva was also known to be one of the best Ceylonese billiards players of his time and was the patron of the Ceylon Amateur Billiards Association. He played rounds with the then-world champions in his mansion and club. He was also the president of the Ceylon Turf Club and had the rare distinction of winning two Governor's Cups in Ceylon with his favourites Louvello and L'Allegro as well as a Governor's Cup in Calcutta. As president, he maintained a high level of integrity in the "Sport of Kings". He was also one of the first Ceylonese to own a Rolls-Royce.

== Honors ==
Ernest de Silva was knighted as a Knight Bachelor on 1 January 1946 by King George VI for his public services in Ceylon in the 1946 New Year Honours. In recognition of his services, Flower Road (where he resided) was renamed Sir Ernest de Silva Mawatha and a stamp was issued in his honour. Considered the most respected and wealthiest Ceylonese of his generation, he was offered the position of the first Ceylonese Governor General (Representative of the British Monarch in Ceylon, i.e. de facto Head of State), which he declined for personal reasons.

Sir Ernest de Silva died at the age of 70, almost ten years after Ceylon gained independence, a cause he strived for. At his funeral, attended by many state officials and leaders, S.W.R.D. Bandaranaike, who was the prime minister at the time, mentioned the loss the nation has to bear with and thanked the departed philanthropist for his services for Sri Lanka, saying that he was a "true gentleman in every sense of the word".
