= Sirisena Amarasekara =

Sri Lankan public servant and diplomat

His Excellency Sirisena Amarasekara
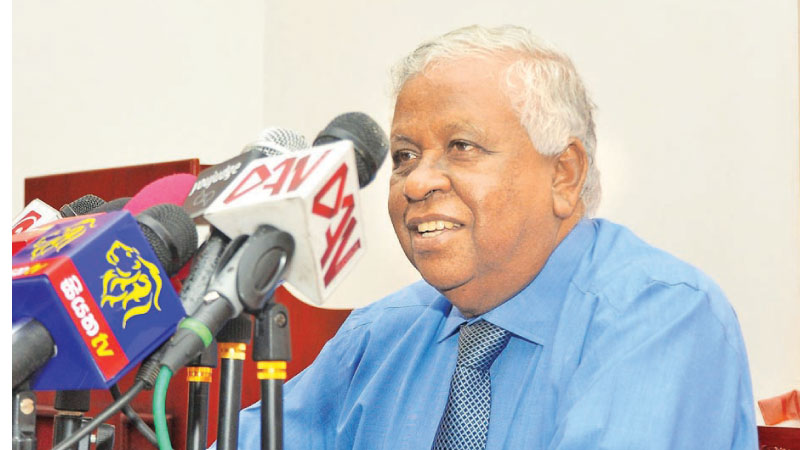

Sri Lanka Ambassador to South Africa, Mozambique, Namibia, Zambia, Zimbabwe, Lesotho, Angola, Botswana, and Eswatini
- In office September 2020 – February 2022

Secretary to the Prime Minister
- In office April 2010 – January 2015
- President: Mahinda Rajapaksa
- Prime Minister: D.M. Jayaratne

Secretary to the Prime Minister
- In office October 2018 – December 2018
- President: Maithripala Sirisena
- Prime Minister: Mahinda Rajapaksa

Secretary to the Cabinet of Ministers
- In office November 2019 – September 2020
- President: Gotabaya Rajapaksa
- Prime Minister: Mahinda Rajapaksa

Personal details
- Born: 1946 (age 79–80) Middeniya
- Spouse: A.D.H Amarasekara
- Children: Chaminda, Lasantha
- Education: University of Peradeniya, University of Bath, University of Birmingham
- Profession: Civil Servant, Diplomat

Sirisena Amarasekara is a Sri Lankan public servant and diplomat. He is the former Sri Lankan High Commissioner to South Africa, Mozambique, Namibia, Zambia, Zimbabwe, Lesotho, Angola, Botswana, and Eswatin. He had functioned as the secretary to the prime minister on two occasions, and as the secretary to the Cabinet of Sri Lanka. Having completed more than 50 years of public service, Amarasekara is one of the most senior Sri Lankan public servants.

== Early life and education ==
Sirisena Amarasekara was born in 1946 in Mideniya, which is situated in the Hambantota District, on the southern coast of Sri Lanka. He is a BCom (Hon) graduate from the University of Peradeniya. He also holds postgraduate qualifications in Development Economics from the University of Bath and also has postgraduate qualifications from the University of Birmingham.

== Career ==
Amarasekara joined the Ministry of Planning and Economic Affairs in 1970 and served for more than 50 years in the public sector in various senior positions. He served for 20 years as a Secretary for ministries such as Highways and Road Development, Fisheries and Aquaculture Development, Ports and Shipping, and Agriculture. He also served as the Secretary to the Prime Minister on two occasions, and as the Secretary to the Cabinet of Ministers.

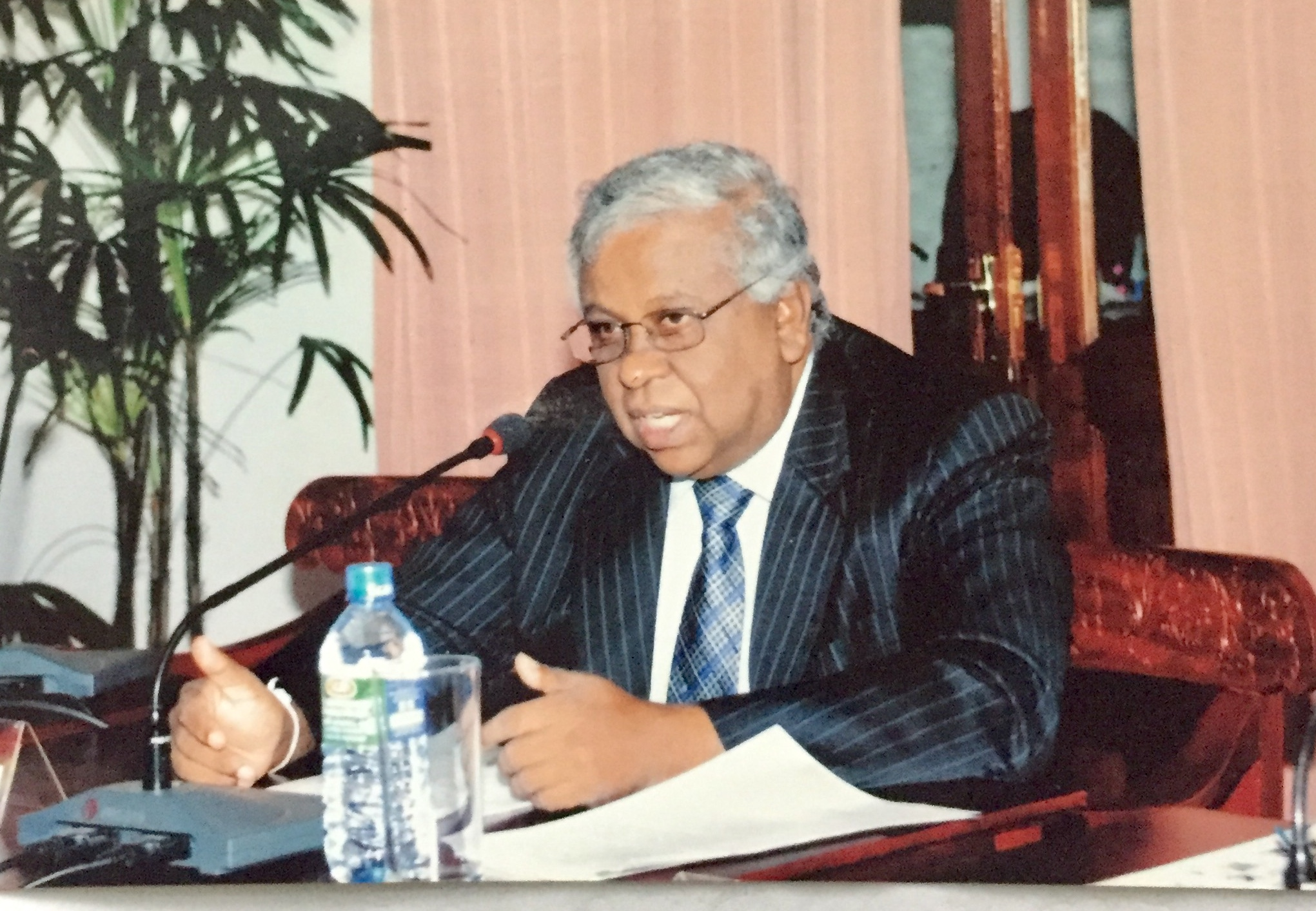
Sirisena Amarasekara addressing a gathering

He has also served as the Chairman of Road Development Authority and Chairman of the Urban Development Authority. After his retirement from the public service in 2015 he served as the chairman of the 'Pavura association of Intellectual Professionals' and as the president of 'Voice for Justice' a NGO to voice against political victimization.

He has served in various positions in the past including as the Secretary to the Ministry of Western Regional Development, Chairman of the Petroleum Corporation, Chairman of the Road Development Authority, Chairman of the Urban Development Authority, Chairman of the Hector Kobbekaduwa Agriculture Research Institute, Director General of Regional Development as part of the Ministry of Policy Planning, Director of Integrated Rural Development project of Matara District, Director General of Mahaweli Authority, and the Additional Director General of Southern Development Authority.

In September 2020, he was appointed Sri Lankan High Commissioner Extraordinary and Plenipotentiary for South Africa, Mozambique, Namibia, Zambia, Zimbabwe, Lesotho, Angola, Botswana, and Eswatini (the Sri Lankan diplomatic missions for the aforementioned nations fall under the purview of the Sri Lankan diplomatic mission in Pretoria). As the Sri Lankan High Commissioner, he functioned as the executive head of the Sri Lankan diplomatic mission in Pretoria, South Africa.

== Secretary to the Prime Minister ==
Following the Appointment of the new prime minister D.M. Jayaratne in 2010, Amarasekara, who functioned as the Secretary to the Ministry of Agriculture at that time, was appointed as the Secretary to the Prime Minister, and continued to function in this office until 2015, when he was succeeded by S. Ekanayaka.

In 2018, when the former president Mahinda Rajapaksa was appointed prime minister, Sirisena Amarasekara was appointed the Secretary to the Prime Minister. This was the second time he served in this office.

== Past Appointments ==
- Sri Lankan High Commissioner to South Africa
- Secretary to the Prime Minister
- Secretary to the Cabinet of Ministers
- Secretary to Ministry of Highways and Road Development
- Secretary to Ministry of Fisheries and Aquaculture Development
- Secretary to Ministry of Ports and Shipping
- Secretary to Ministry of Agriculture
- Secretary to the Ministry of Western Regional Development
- Chairman of Petroleum Corporation
- Chairman of Road Development Authority
- Chairman of Urban Development Authority
- Board Member of the Sri Lanka Telecom
- Chairman of Hector Kobbekaduwa Agricultural Research Institute
- Secretary of the Southern Development Task Force
- Director General of Regional Development (Ministry of Policy Planning)
- Director of Integrated Rural Development Project of Matara District
- Director General of Mahaweli Authority
- Additional Director General of Southern Development Authority

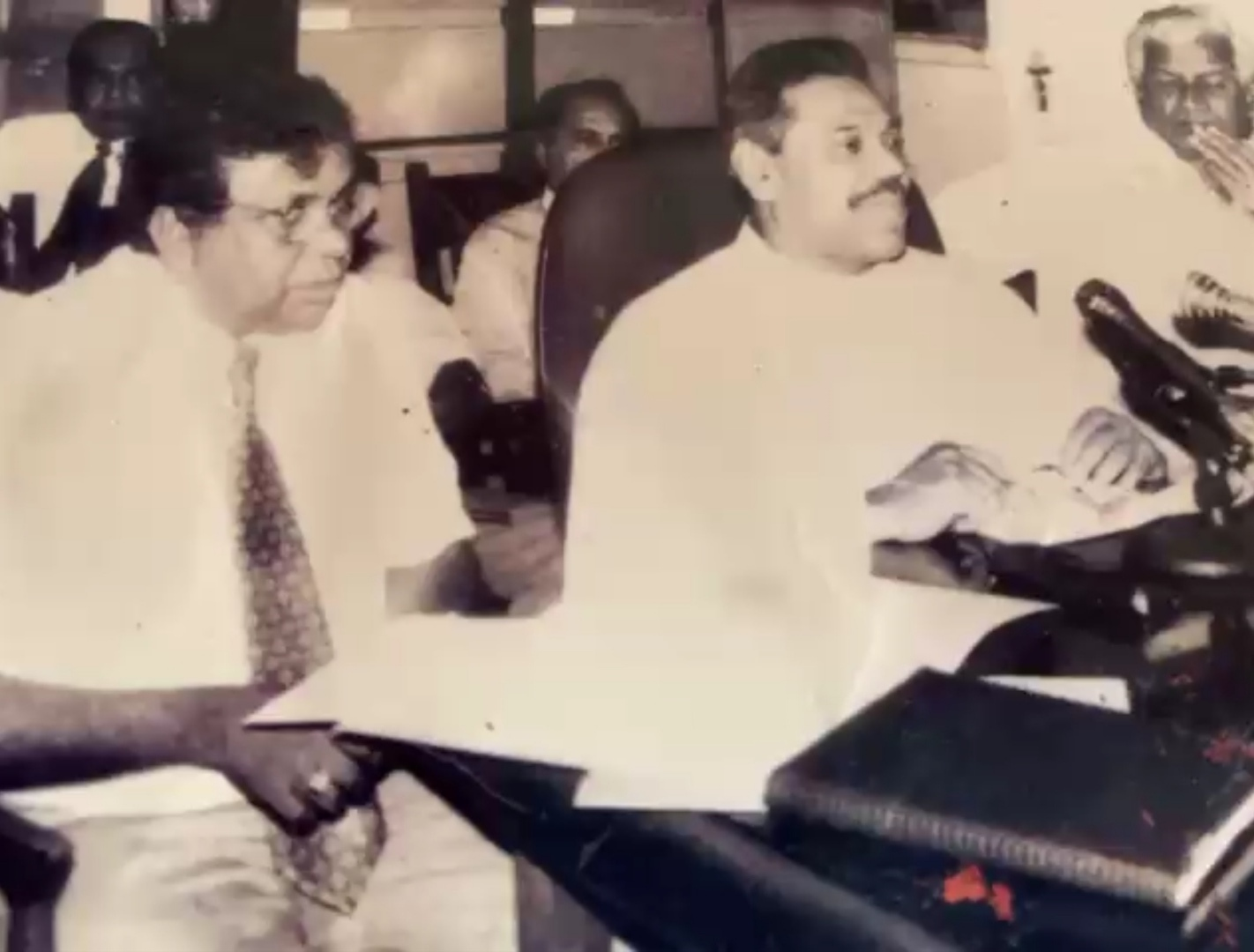
Then Fisheries and Aquatic Resources Minister Mahinda Rajapaksa with senior civil servant Sirisena Amarasekara

== Personal life ==
Srisena Amarasekara is married to A.D.H. Amarasekara and has two sons: Chaminda Amarasekara, who is a Doctor in the service of the Sri Lanka Navy, and Lasantha Amarasekara, who is a banker.

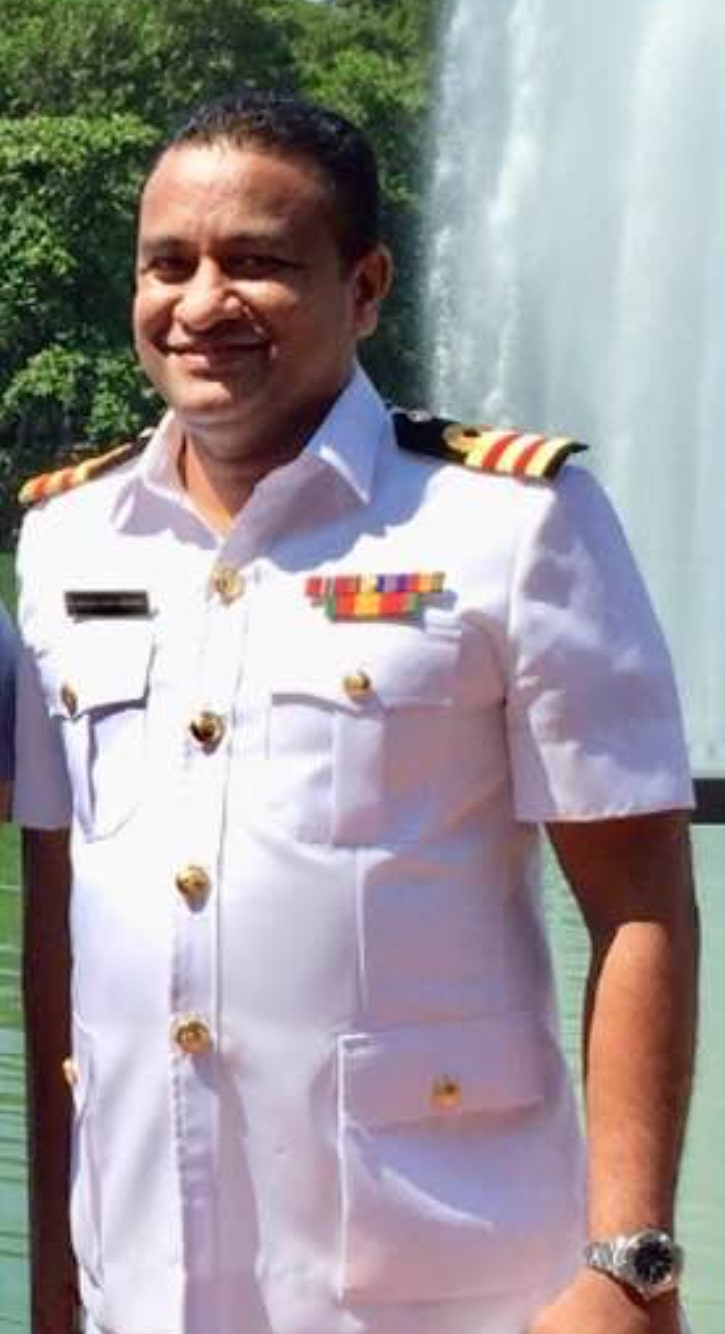
Dr Chaminda Amarasekara, a Sri Lankan Naval officer

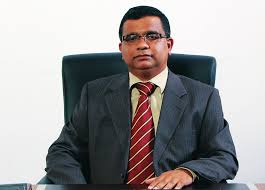
Lasantha Amarasekara, a Sri Lankan Banker
