= K. Balapatabendi =

Permanent Secretary to the President of Sri Lanka

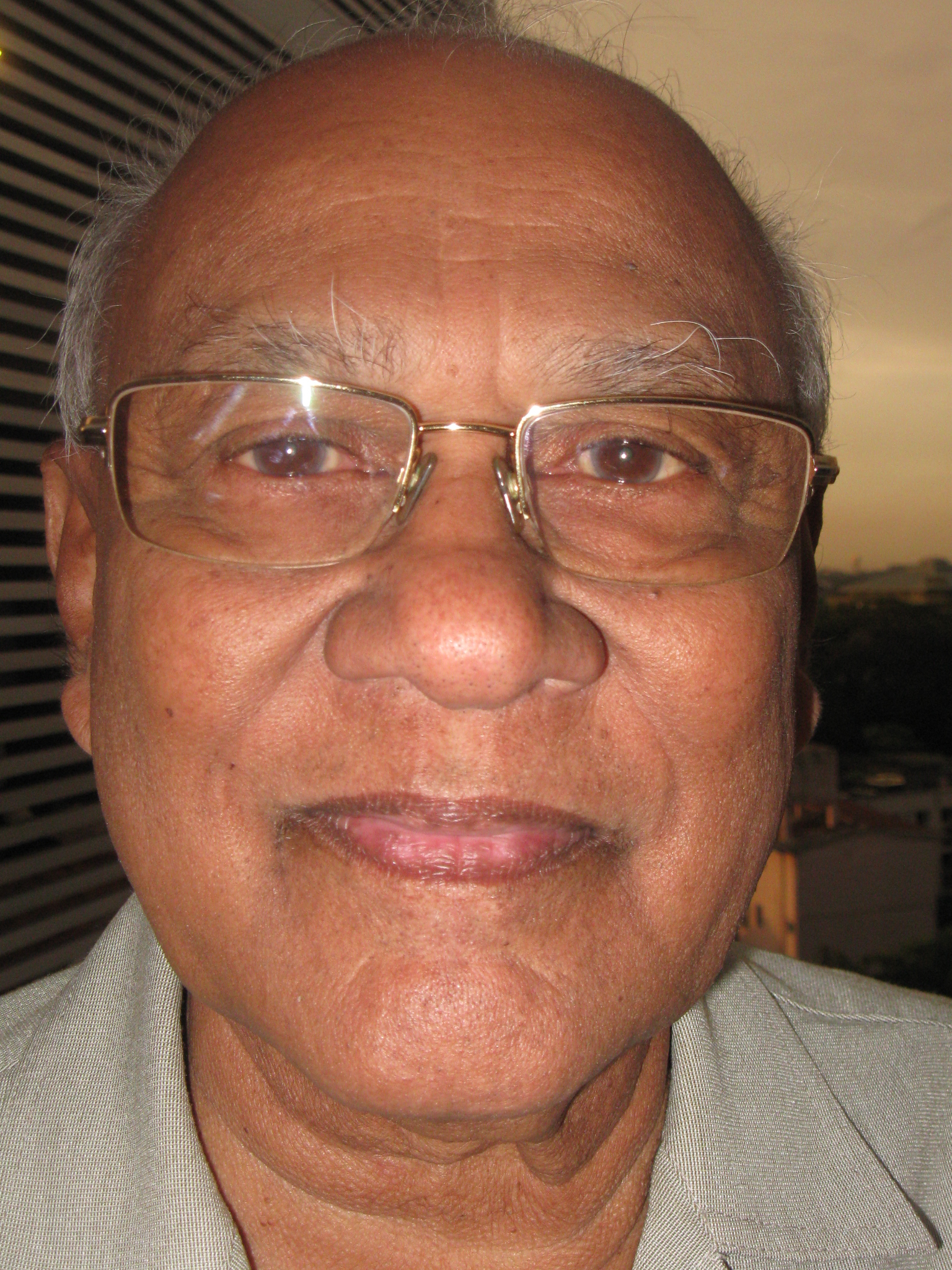

Secretary to the President of Sri Lanka
- In office 1994–2003

Personal details
- Born: Sri Lanka
- Education: Rahula College, Matara

Kusumsiri Balapatabendi , PC (known as K. Balapatabendi) is a Sri Lankan lawyer and diplomat, He was the Permanent Secretary to the President of Sri Lanka (also known as the President's Secretary). Prior to the appointment he was the Secretary to the Prime Minister of Sri Lanka. Balapatabendi had also served as Chairman, SriLankan Airlines, Senior Legal Adviser to President and Sri Lankan High Commissioner to Australia and New Zealand. He was educated at Rahula College Matara.

== Legal career ==
Balapatabendi was a lawyer for several years in the appellate Courts and District Courts and was appointed a President's Counsel in 1995. He was also the President of the Law Society, Colombo in the 1980s. He holds a degree and a Masters in Law of the University of Colombo.

== Diplomatic career ==
From 2004 to 2008 he served as Sri Lanka's Lankan High Commissioner to Australia and New Zealand.

== See also ==
- Sri Lankan Non Career Diplomats
