= Public Services of Sri Lanka =

The Public Services of Sri Lanka are a series of services groups that provide specialized professional services to the Government of Sri Lanka. These are government employees who carry out public duties, however they are not elected officials. The most senior of these is the Sri Lanka Administrative Service which is the country's permanent bureaucracy. The Sri Lankan Government is the largest employer in the country and the public services are often criticized as overstaffed and inefficient.

Their members are selected by competitive examination and promotions are made by the Public Service Commission.

== Public Services ==
(Professionals)

- Sri Lanka Administrative Service
- Sri Lanka Overseas Service
- Sri Lanka Police Service
- Sri Lanka Customs Service
- Sri Lanka Educational Administrative Service
- Sri Lanka Immigration Service
- Sri Lanka Inland Revenue Service
- Sri Lanka Accountants' Service
- Sri Lanka Medical Service
- Sri Lanka Planning Service
- Sri Lanka Information & Communication Technology Service
- Sri Lanka Agricultural Service
- Sri Lanka Valuers' Service
- Sri Lanka Scientific Service
- Sri Lanka Engineering Service
- Sri Lanka Animal Protection and Health Service
- Sri Lanka Surveyors' Service
- Sri Lanka Architects Service
- Sri Lanka Technical Education Service
- Sri Lanka Technical Service
- Sri Lanka Translators' Service
- Judicial Service
- Legal Officers
- Island Wildlife Service
- Nursing Service
- Principle Service
- Teaching Service
- Sri Lanka Development Officers’ Service

== Support Services ==
(Non professionals)

- Management Service Officer Service
- Development officer Service
- Librarians Service
- Drivers Service
- Office Employees Service (K.K.S.)
- Management Assistance Service
- Sri Lanka Development Assistants' Service
