= Sri Lanka Administrative Service =

Government agency in Sri Lanka

The Sri Lanka Administrative Service (SLAS) (Sinhala: ශ්‍රී ලංකා පරිපාලන සේවය; śrī laṁkā paripālana sēvaya, Tamil:ஸ்ரீ இலங்கை நிருவாக சேவை; Sri lanka niruvágah sévai) is the key administrative service of the Government of Sri Lanka, with civil servants working for both in the Central Government as well as in the provincial councils. It was formed as the Ceylon Administrative Service (CAS) in 1963 as the successor to the Ceylon Civil Service which was abolished on May 1, 1963. It is the senior of the public services.

Based on the British Civil Service the SLAS is the permanent bureaucracy that helps the elected officials on day-to-day functions of government. They are selected, promoted by the Public Service Commission. But top positions in the government such as Permanent Secretaries are appointed by the President, in theory on the recommendations of the Public Service Commission.

A Permanent Secretary is the top bureaucrat of the government ministry and is responsible for the day-to-day functions of the ministry whereas in theory the minister is responsible only for drafting policy. The head of the SLAS is the Secretary to the President.

A Chief Secretary is a Special Grade officer of the Sri Lanka Administrative Service in the provinces which is equivalent to a Permanent Secretary of the central government known as Chief Secretary. There are nine Chief Secretaries, one for each of the nine provinces.

== Grading schemes ==
Until 2005, broader term officers are classed into SLAS class 1 officers, SLAS class 2 grade 1, and SLAS class 2 grade 2. All grades from SLAS class 1 and above (see table) are part of the "Senior officers ". The Secretary to the Treasury was the traditional head of the Civil Service during the time of the old Ceylon Civil Service, but in years after the establishment of the SLAS the President's Secretary is the de facto head of the SLAS if he/she is a former SLAS officer.

After 1 January 2005 Sri Lanka Administrative service introduced four grades, such as:

- Special Grade offices (present cadre is 200)
- Class I officers (present cadre is 507)
- Class II officers (present cadre is 639)
- Class III officers (present cadre is 1059)

Below the "Senior officers "(Special Grade offices, Class I officers and ), each individual department can put in place its own grading.

The traditional titles for each grade of the civil service are as follows:

Traditional Title	Alternative Title	Grade
Secretary to the President		
Permanent Secretary	Chief Secretary	
Permanent Secretary to the Ministry of Finance	Secretary to the Treasury	
Additional Secretary	Commissioner-General, Director-General	Special Grade officers
Senior Assistant Secretary	Commissioner, Director	Class I officers
Assistant Secretary	Deputy Commissioner, Deputy Director	Class II officers
Titles vary widely	Assistant Commissioner, Assistant Director	Class III officers

- The post of Deputy Secretary is only used in the Ministry of Finance is ranked just below the post of Permanent Secretary.

== Notable members of the SLAS ==
- Nissanka Wijeyeratne
- Dharmasena Wijesinghe
- Ronnie De Mel
- D.B.I.P.S. Siriwardhana
- Bradman Weerakoon
- Sarath Amunugama
- Wimal Amarasekara
- Sanath Weerakoon
- Prematilaka Mapitigama
- Lalith Weeratunga
- P.B. Abeykoon
- R. Paskaralingam
- Mahinda Deshapriya
- Tilak Ranaviraja

== See also ==
- Public Services of Sri Lanka
