= P. B. Abeykoon =

Secretary to the President of Sri Lanka

Secretary to the President of Sri Lanka
- In office 2015–2017

P. B. Abeykoon, PC is the former Permanent Secretary to the President of Sri Lanka (also known as the President's Secretary).

== Education ==
He obtained a Special Degree in Economics from University of Kelaniya in 1980 and a Diploma in Agriculture from the School of Agriculture, Kundasale in 1981 & his Masters in Development Management (MOM) from the Asian Institute of Management (AIM) Manila, the Philippines in 1995. He is an Attorney in the Supreme Court of Sri Lanka.

== Career ==
Abeykoon joined the Sri Lanka Administrative Service in 1982 and started his career as an Assistant Government Agent, at Gomarankadawela (Trincomalee District). Then he moved to the Department of Immigration & Emigration and worked as an Assistant Controller and later Deputy Controller. Subsequently, he was appointed as the deputy director, Combined Services Department, Ministry of Public Administration and Home Affairs where he served till 2000.

From 2004 to 2005 he functioned as the Commissioner General, Department of Registration of Persons, Colombo and from 2005 to 2010 as the Controller General, Department of Immigration & Emigration. As Controller General.

== Personal life ==
He is married with three children, two sons and a daughter.

== See also ==
- Notable members of the SLAS
