= Prematilaka Mapitigama =

Secretary to President J.R. Jayewardene
- In office 1988–1989

Secretary General, J.R. Jayewardene Centre
- In office 1993–2012

Additional Secretary to the Ministries of Irrigation, Power & Highways; Lands & Land Development; Lands, Irrigation & Mahaweli Development;
- In office 1977–1990

Assistant Secretary to the Ministry of Defense and External Affairs
- In office 1970–1977

Personal details
- Born: 7 January 1930 Mattamagoda, Ceylon
- Died: 14 April 2012 (aged 82) Colombo, Sri Lanka
- Spouse: Nalini Mapitigama (née Senaratne)
- Children: Nethanjalie, Niranjana
- Occupation: Civil servant, author, publisher
- Profession: Ceylon Administrative Service

Prematilaka Mapitigama, also known as K. W. M. P. Mapitigama, (7 January 1930 – 14 April 2012) (Sinhala: ප්‍රේමතිලක මාපිටිගම) was a senior Sri Lankan civil servant, author and a publisher. As the Secretary to President J. R. Jayewardene, Mapitigama was one of the highest ranking public servants in the government of Sri Lanka. At the time of his death he was serving as the Secretary General of J.R. Jayewardene Center at 191 Dharmapala Mawatha, Colombo 7. Mapitigama succeeded W.M. P. B. Menikdiwela as the Secretary to President J. R. Jayewardene in 1988, and continued until the demise of the late president on 1 November 1996. He also authored and published a number of books both in Sinhalese and in English.

== Early life and family ==
Prematilaka Mapitigama was born on 7 January 1930 as the eldest son of Panditharatna Bandara Mapitigama and Leelawathie Higgoda Kumarihamy of Pelange Walawwa, Mattamagoda, Ruwanwella. He and his wife, Nalini (née Senaratne), had two children, Nethanjalie and Niranjana.

== Civil service ==
Prematilaka Mapitigama entered the Ceylon Administrative Service (CAS) in 1968. From 1970 to 1977, he functioned as the Assistant Secretary of Ministry of Defense & External Affairs under the Prime Minister of Sri Lanka, Sirimavo Ratwatte Dias Bandaranaike. From 1977 until 1990 he served as the Additional Secretary to the ministries of Irrigation, Power & Highways; Land & Land Development; and Lands, Irrigation & Mahaweli Development; all under Cabinet Minister Lionel Gamini Dissanayake. Mapitigama succeeded W. M. P. B. Menikdiwela as the Secretary to President J.R. Jayewardene in 1988 and continued to be the Secretary to the Former President until the demise of President Jayewardene on 1 November 1996. Thereafter, he continued to function as the Secretary General of the Jayewardene Centre until he died on 14 April 2012.

Mapitigama has held number of senior positions in the SLAS and notably the below:

- 1993 – 2012 Secretary General, J.R. Jayewardene Centre
- 1988 – 1996 Secretary to President J.R. Jayewardene
- 1977 – 1990 Additional Secretary to the Ministries of Irrigation, Power & Highways; Lands & Land Development; Lands, Irrigation & Mahaweli Development
- 1980 – 1990 Director, State Development & Construction Corporation
- 1980 – 1990 Director, Freedom from Hunger Campaign Board
- 1985 – 1987 Chairman of Water Resources Board
- 1976 – 1977 Deputy Commissioner of Probation & Child Care Services
- 1970 – 1977 Assistant Secretary to the Ministry of Defense and External Affairs

== Writing ==
Mapitigama turned his hand to writing at a very young age, first writing to newspapers and then publishing his first novel in 1952 in Sinhalese named "Hinawa” (“The Smile”). The cover was designed by the famous book cover artist G.L. Gauthamadasa. His second book, “Geheniyak Nisa” (“Because of a woman”) was released about 7 years afterwards. The third, “Muhunu Dekak” (“Two faces”), a supplementary reader for schools, followed soon after and was co-authored by Sunanda Mahendra, now a professor of Mass Media. Mapitigama published his fourth book in early 1960s in Sinhalese, "සාර්ථක විවාහයට මඟ" (Way To A Happy Marriage), based on his years in the Marriage and Divorce Commission of Sri Lanka. A series of books followed and one of his final books in English, Longest Days was published in 2002, based on his vast experience in government service.

== Jayewardene Centre ==
Mapitigama is recognised for establishing the Jayewardene Centre according to a cabinet act in 1988. The Centre opened the doors to public for the first time in 1993. Mapitigama was appointed by the cabinet of ministers in 1993 as the founding Secretary General of the centre. He held this position for 19 years, until his demise in 2012. J.R. Jayewardene Centre consists of three sectors, Museum in which documents, artefacts, gifts of state and museum exhibits are maintained that relate to the former president's life and career, Library and the Conference Hall which provides an active series of public programs, where lectures, conferences and political and socio economic debates are held regularly. The most important textual materials in the library and the museum are those created by the President and his staff in the course of performing the official duties. Library also house numerous objects including family heirlooms, items collected by the President and his family, campaign memorabilia, awards, and the many gifts given to the President by foreign dignitaries. These gifts range in type from homemade items to valuable works of art. Other significant holdings include the personal papers and historical materials donated by individuals associated with the President. These individuals may include envoys to foreign governments, political party associates, and the President's family and personal friends.

== Death ==
Mapitigama was treated by cardiologist Dr. Hemal Anthony Fernando, who was also the personal physician of President J.R. Jayewardene. Mapitigama died on Saturday 14 April 2012 at the age of 82 at the Intensive Care Unit of the Asha Central Hospital in Colombo. On Sunday 15 April 2012, Mapitigama's body was carried and placed in the lobby of the J.R. Jayewardene Centre for diplomats, public figures, dignitaries and general public to pay their respect. This was the first funeral held at the J.R. Jayewardene Centre, since opening the doors to public in 1993. On Wednesday 18 April 2012, the casket was driven in a motorcade, by hearse, and was cremated at the General Cemetery in Borella.

== Books ==
- Hinawa ("The Smile") (self-published, 1952)
- Geheniyak Nisa ("Because of a woman") (Deepani Publishers, Gangodawila, Sri Lanka, 1959)
- Muhunu Dekak ("Two faces") (self-published, 1959)
- Longest Days (self-published, 2000)
- JR in cartoon (2002)
- Eka Diga Gamanak
- සාර්ථක විවාහයට මඟ (Sarthaka vivahayata maga | Way to a Happy Marriage, 1960, Revised 2002)
