= R. Paskaralingam =

Sri Lankan civil servant

R. Paskaralingam is a Sri Lankan civil servant. He was selected in one of the last batches of the Ceylon Civil Service, before it became the Sri Lankan Administrative Service. He was a government agent, served as secretary to the Treasury (1989 – 1994) and as a senior advisor to the Prime Minister of Sri Lanka (2002–2004 and 2015–2019).
