= U. N. Gunasekera =

Sri Lankan civil engineer

U.N. Gunasekera
- Education: Royal College, Colombo; University of London
- Engineering career
- Discipline: Civil engineer; Structural engineer
- Institutions: Institution of Structural Engineers
- Projects: Ceylon Inter-Continental, Cinnamon Grand

U.N. Gunasekera (1922–2008), was a Sri Lankan civil engineer. He is a notable Sri Lankan civil engineer. He revolutionized engineering in Sri Lanka through his construction of high-rise buildings, including Sri Lanka's first five-star hotel (the Ceylon Inter-Continental) and its largest five-star hotel (the Cinnamon Grand), among various other projects.

== Early life ==
He studied at the Royal College, Colombo. Having completed the University of Cambridge Higher Diploma, he graduated from the University of London with a degree in Engineering and qualifying as a Chartered Engineer.

== Civil engineering ==
Gunasekera developed a large construction business that captured a large portion of the market share. He was the first Sri Lankan engineer to build high-rise buildings. By initiating the construction of high rise buildings in Sri Lanka, he played a role in the economic and social development of Sri Lanka. In 1995, he was the only pre-qualified Sri Lankan engineer to bid for the 2.6 billion Marriott renovation of the Galle Face Hotel. He was named one of the five billionaires of Sri Lanka in 1998, prior to his retirement.

In addition to his construction ventures owned other commercial enterprises, such as the Glass House Health Center and Diagnostic Laboratory, a printing press, and a food manufacturing company. He was a prominent real estate mogul, having invested in a famed billion-rupee multi-acre property in Sri Lanka's capital. He developed many influential friendships, including with Sirimavo Bandaranaike and Ranasinghe Premadasa.

Projects

- Bank headquarters
  - Hatton National Bank
- Hotels
  - Ceylon Inter-Continental
  - Lanka Oberoi aka Cinnamon Grand, including all 3 stages and 600 rooms
  - Habarana Lodge and Mount Lavinia Hotel Extension
- Political party headquarters
  - SLFP
  - UNP
- Places of worship
  - Cathedral of Christ the Living Savior
- Shopping malls
  - Welikada Plaza
  - YMBA
- Apartment complexes
  - Police
- Office complexes
  - People's Park Complex
- Auditoriums
  - Bishop's College Auditorium
- Office buildings
  - Hemas
- Headquarters for the Armed Forces
  - National Armed Reserve
  - Air Force
  - National Intelligence Bureau
- Factory buildings
  - Ceylon Glass Company
- Academic headquarters
  - Institution of Engineers
  - Institute of Chartered Accountants
  - Institute of Business Management
- University buildings
  - Science Faculty, University of Colombo
  - Arts Faculty, University of Colombo
- Warehouses
  - Aitken Spence
  - Ferntea
- Houses
  - Sirimavo Bandaranaike's

== Recognition ==
Gunasekera was elected Fellow and President of the Institute of Engineers, Sri Lanka for five consecutive years, later serving as the chairman of its board of trustees. In 2006, he was awarded membership of the Institution of Structural Engineers and life membership of the National Construction Association (whose presidency he declined), in recognition of his professional excellence. He also received an award for 50 years of construction activity from the World Institute of Engineers.

He was also the president of Ceylonese Rugby & Football Club, vice-president of the Sinhalese Sports Club and vice-president of the Royal College Union.

== Personal life ==
He is the grandson of Gate Mudaliyar Abraham Mendis Gunasekera Wijaya Sri Wardana, a literary figure and the founder of the Sinhala-English Dictionary, and the great-grandson of Mudaliyar Bastian Mendis Gunasekera.

Gunasekera married Sita de Silva, daughter of Sir Ernest de Silva and Lady Evadne De Silva. They had three children, Srimani who became a doctor, son Dhammika, who became an engineer and younger daughter, Sushila, was a prominent tennis player in the early 1970s before attending university to study architecture.

Gunasekera was a strong Buddhist and was one of the largest contributors to charities in Sri Lanka. He constructed the Sambodhi Vihara in Colombo.
