= Presidential Secretariat (Sri Lanka) =

Office of the President of Sri Lanka

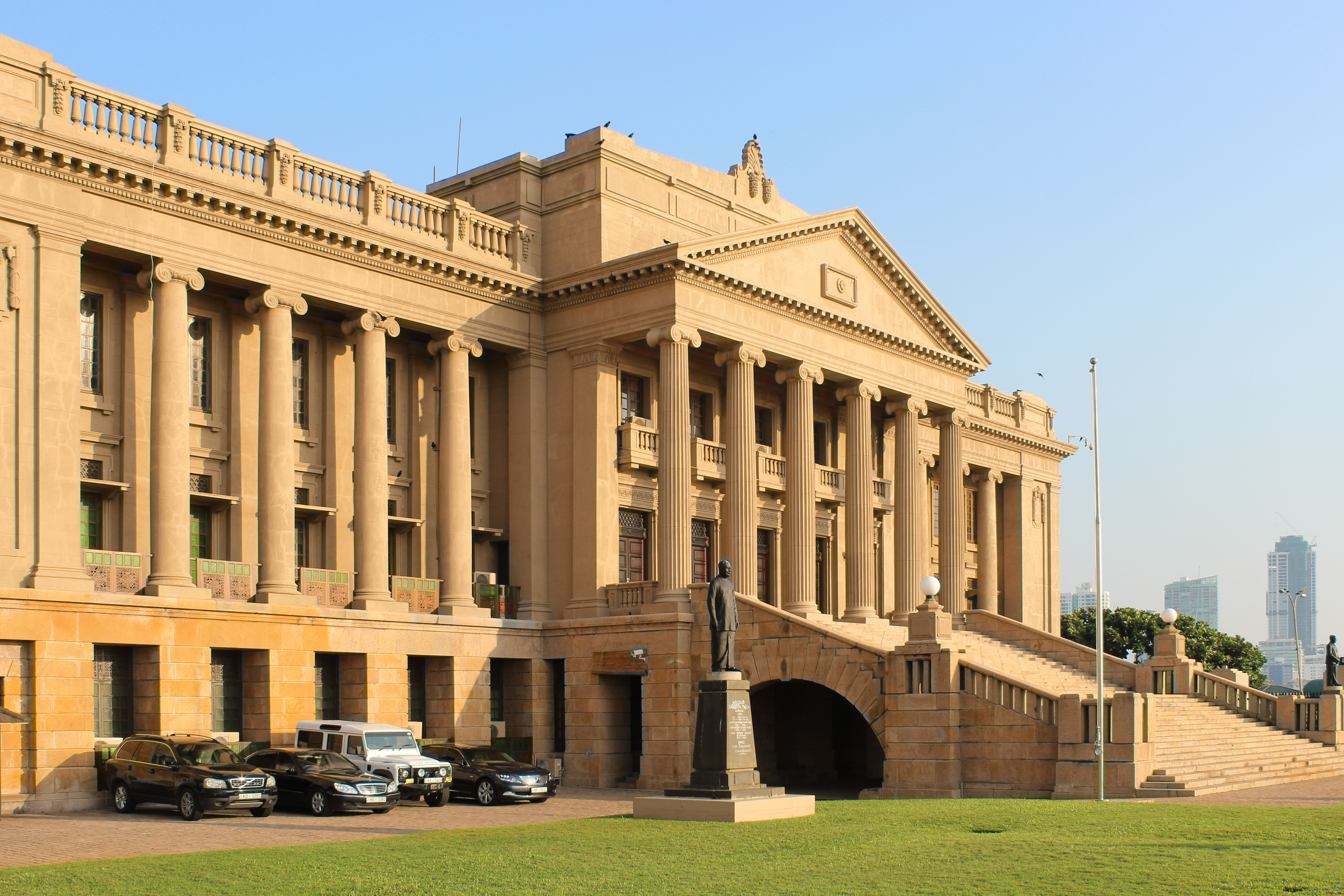
- Presidential Secretariat building

Agency overview
- Formed: 1978
- Jurisdiction: Government of Sri Lanka
- Headquarters: Old Parliament Building, Colombo
- Agency executive: Nandika Sanath Kumanayake, President's Secretary
- Website: Official website

The Presidential Secretariat (Sinhala: ජනාධිපති ලේකම් කාර්යාලය, romanized: janādhipati lēkam kāryālaya) is the office of the President of Sri Lanka. It provides the administrative and institutional framework for exercising the duties, responsibilities and powers vested in the President by the Constitution. The Presidential Secretariat is located in the Old Parliament Building in Colombo.

The head of the Presidential Secretariat is the Secretary to the President (also known as the President's Secretary), who is ex officio the most senior civil servant and head of the Sri Lanka Administrative Service. The current President's Secretary is Nandika Sanath Kumanayake. The post has its roots from the post of Secretary to the Governors of Ceylon and thereafter the Secretary to the Governor-General of Ceylon.

== Duties ==
The President's Office shall be concerned with the following aspects of governance:-

- Co-ordinating and reviewing the implementation of Government policy in all sectors;
- Monitoring progress in the implementation of specific projects and programmes;
- Addressing perceived public aspirations and grievances, and
- Maintaining a watching brief over the nation's external relations.

== Divisions ==
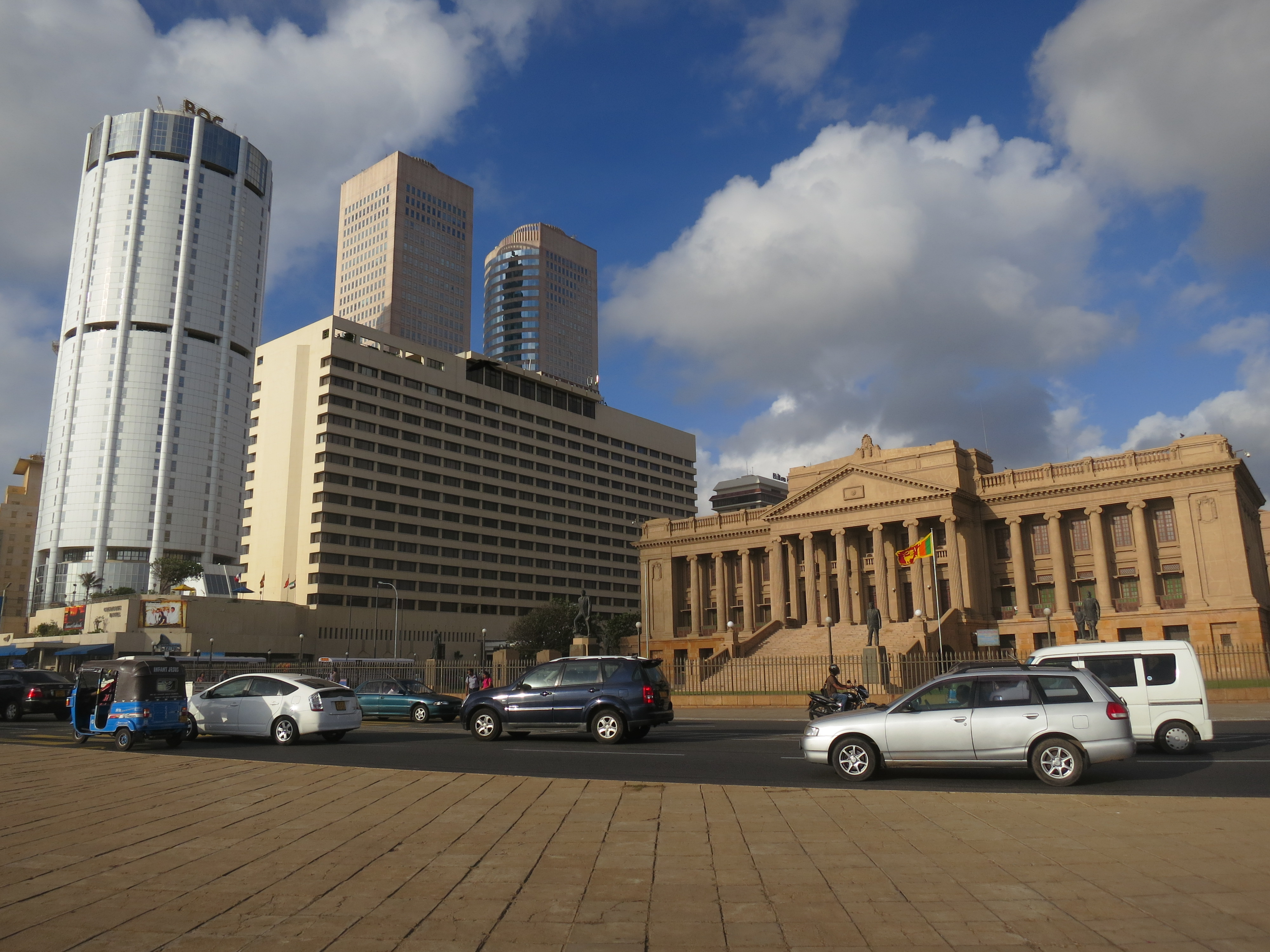
The Secretariat, with the Galadari Hotel, Central Bank building and World Trade Center towers in the background

The Presidential Secretariat includes the following Divisions:

- Agency Co-ordination Unit (ACU)
- Chief of Staff Division (COS)
- Citizens Services and Grievance Response Division (CSGR)
- Constitutional and Statutory Affairs Division (CSA)
- Electronic Media Unit (EMU)
- Establishment & Operations Division (E&O)
- Establishment and Human Resources Development Unit (EHRDU)
- Financial and Accounts Division (FAD)
- Information and Communication Technology Unit (ICT)
- Internal Administration Unit (IAU)
- Internal Audit (IA)
- Legal Affairs Unit (LAU)
- Media Co-ordination Unit (MCU)
- Photography and Video Unit (PVU)
- Policy Co-ordination and Monitoring Division (PCM)
- Policy Research & Information Unit (PRIU)
- Presidential Investigation Unit (PIU)
- President's Fund (PF)
- Presidents Media Division (PMD)
- Private Secretary's Division
- Public Services Evaluation and Social Welfare Unit (PSESW)
- Religious Affairs Unit (RAU)
- Secretary Bureau (SB)
- Special Projects Unit (SPU)
- Strategy and Perception management Unit (SPMU)
- Trade Union Unit (TU)

== Statutory institutions ==
The following institutions fall within the purview of the Secretary to the President;

- Public Service Commission
- Judicial Service Commission
- Parliamentary Commissioner for Administration
- Board of Management for the Superior Courts Complex
- Cabinet Memoranda listed in the Agenda and Cabinet Conclusions
- Commission to Investigate Allegations of Bribery/Corruption
- Declarations of Assets and Liabilities

== Presidential Secretaries ==
- W. M. P. B. Menikdiwela, SLAS (1979–1988)
- Prematilaka Mapitigama, SLAS (1988–1989)
- K. H. J. Wijedasa SLAS (1989–1994)
- K. Balapatabendi, PC (1994–2003)
- W. J. S. Karunaratne, SLAS (2003–2005)
- Lalith Weeratunga, SLAS (2005–2015)
- P.B. Abeykoon, SLAS (2015–2017)
- Austin Fernando, SLAS (2017–2018)
- Udaya Ranjith Seneviratne, SLAS (2018–2019)
- P. B. Jayasundera (2019–2022)
- Gamini Sedara Senarath, SLAS (2021-2022)
- E.M.S.B. Ekanayake, SLAS (2022-2024)
- Nandika Sanath Kumanayake (2024-present)

== 2022 Sri Lankan protests ==
On 9 July 2022, during the 2022 Sri Lankan protests, thousands of protesters stormed and occupied President's House and the Presidential Secretariat, Temple Trees (Prime Minister's house) demanding that both president Gotabaya Rajapaksa and prime minister Ranil Wickremesinghe resign immediately.

== See also ==
- President of Sri Lanka
- Prime Minister's Office
- Sri Lanka Administrative Service
