= List of ambassadors of Sri Lanka to Russia =

Representative of Sri Lanka to Russia

Sri Lankan Ambassador to Russia
- Incumbent [Dr.Dayan Jayatilleka]
- Style: His Excellency
- Appointer: Maithripala Sirisena
- Inaugural holder: Gunapala Piyasena Malalasekera as Ceylonese Ambassador to the Soviet Union
- Formation: 1991; 1957 as Ceylonese Ambassador to the Soviet Union
- Website: Embassy of Sri Lanka, Russia

The Sri Lankan Ambassador to Russia is the Sri Lankan envoy to Russia. The Sri Lankan Ambassador to Russia is concurrently accredited as Ambassador to Armenia, Belarus, Kazakhstan, Moldova, Ukraine and Uzbekistan.

== Ambassadors ==
=== Ambassador to the Soviet Union ===
Ambassadors	Start of Term	End of Term	Head of State/Government
Gunapala Piyasena Malalasekera	1957	1961	S. W. R. D. Bandaranaike; Wijeyananda Dahanayake; Dudley Senanayake; Sirimavo Bandaranaike
Tikiri Banda Subasinghe	1961	1965	Sirimavo Bandaranaike
B. F. Perera	1965	1968	Dudley Senanayake
M. V. P. Peiris	1968	1969	Dudley Senanayake
J. C. T. Kotelawala	1969	1970	Dudley Senanayake; Sirimavo Bandaranaike
C. D. S. Siriwardene	1970	1974	Sirimavo Bandaranaike
C. E. S. Weeratunge	1974	1976	Sirimavo Bandaranaike
Walter Jayawardene	1977	1978	Sirimavo Bandaranaike; Junius Richard Jayewardene
R. C. A. Johnpulle	1978	1982	Junius Richard Jayewardene
Neville Kanakaratne	1982	1987	Junius Richard Jayewardene
Rodney Vandergert	1987	1991	Junius Richard Jayewardene; Ranasinghe Premadasa

=== Ambassador to Russia ===
Ambassadors	Start of Term	End of Term	Head of State
Nissanka Wijeyeratne	1991	1994	Ranasinghe Premadasa; Dingiri Banda Wijetunga
N. M. M. I. Hussain	1995	1998	Chandrika Kumaratunga
N. Sikkander	1998	2002	Chandrika Kumaratunga
U. B. Wijekoon	2003	2004	Chandrika Kumaratunga
Neville Ranasuriya	2005	2006	Chandrika Kumaratunga; Mahinda Rajapaksa
Udayanga Weeratunga	2006	28 February 2015	Mahinda Rajapaksa
Saman Weerasinghe	7 September 2015	28 February 2019	Maithripala Sirisena
Dayan Jayatilleka	3 September 2018	14 January 2020	Maithripala Sirisena

== See also ==
- Sri Lankan Ambassador to the Soviet Union
- List of heads of missions from Sri Lanka
- List of ambassadors of Russia to Sri Lanka
