= Vernon Mendis =

Sri Lankan diplomat

Deshamanya Vernon Mendis

12th Sri Lankan Ambassador to the United Kingdom
- In office 1975–1977
- Preceded by: Tilak Goonaratne
- Succeeded by: Noel Wimalasena

Sri Lankan Ambassador to Canada
- In office December 1977 – 1980
- Preceded by: Henry Thambiah
- Succeeded by: Rodney Vandergert

Sri Lankan Ambassador to France
- In office ?–?

Personal details
- Born: 5 December 1925 British Ceylon
- Died: 23 June 2010 (aged 84)
- Spouse: Padma Mendis
- Children: Harish & Dayalini
- Education: University of Ceylon
- Profession: Diplomat

Deshamanya Vernon Loraine Benjamin Mendis (5 December 1925 – 23 June 2010) was a prominent Sri Lankan diplomat, who served as the United Nations' Special Envoy to the Middle East. He is referred to as the Sri Lanka's Father of Diplomacy due to his role in formation of the country's diplomatic service and has served as Sri Lankan High Commissioner to the United Kingdom, Canada; Ambassador to France, Cuba and Secretary General of the Non Aligned Movement.

== Education ==
Vernon Mendis was educated at Prince of Wales' College, Moratuwa. and the Royal College Colombo. He then pursued further studies at the University of Ceylon, where he studied history gaining a Bachelor of Arts (Second Upper Honours in History). His classmate at Royal College Colombo was Hon. Justice Christopher Weeramantry who became the Vice-President of the International Court of Justice. He would later gain a Master of Philosophy from School of Oriental and African Studies of the University of London.

== Diplomatic career ==
Mendis was in the first batch of cadets who were taken into the newly formed Ceylon Overseas Service in 1949 through a highly competitive examination and selection process and later given permanent appointment by Prime Minister D. S. Senanayake. His first placement was as counselor in Ceylon's embassy in Washington, D.C., where Sir Claude Corea was ambassador. After Washington he was sent to Tokyo to the newly established mission there before its first ambassador, Sir Susantha de Fonseka arrived. He then served in Ceylon's missions in Paris as Chargé d'affaires (1953–1955) and Moscow (1955–1960) where G.P. Malalasekera was the ambassador. He was recalled to Ceylon in 1960 to be appointed Chief of Protocol in the Ministry of Defense and External Affairs at the age of 35, one of the youngest to hold that position. Next he was made deputy high commissioner for Ceylon in London and later in New Delhi.

In 1965 he was appointed High Commissioner to the United Kingdom. In 1970 he was recalled to Colombo, where he was Foreign Affairs Advisor to the Prime Minister Sirimavo Bandaranaike, during which time he played a major role in the formulation of foreign policy of Sri Lanka which had become a republic in 1972. A major milestone of his career was in 1976 when he functioned as the Secretary General of the Non Aligned Movement Summit in Colombo, where he had to chair sessions in the presence of some of the greatest leaders at the time, such as Indian Prime Minister Indira Gandhi, Yugoslavian Premier Marshal Josip Broz Tito, Cuban President Fidel Castro. Soon after he was appointed the high commissioner of Sri Lanka to Canada with concurrent accreditation to Cuba. When his tenure as high commissioner ended in 1980 he retired from the Sri Lanka Overseas Service.

== United Nations Special Envoy to the Middle East ==
Soon after leaving the foreign Service he took up a posting with the United Nations as Special Envoy in the Middle East based in Cairo, serving as the Regional Director of UNESCO. There he was in charge of looking after the interests of the United Nations in the Gulf where Egypt was making waves in its foreign policy. He had to deal with some of the issues in relation to Egypt's Cultural Treasures on behalf of the UNESCO and with Egypt's relations with Sudan.

== Later life ==
Returning to Sri Lanka after his work in the UN, he served as the chairman of the Telecom Board for three years. He was also served as a Peace Fellow at the United States Institute of Peace in Washington and was the funding Director-General of the Bandaranaike International Diplomatic Training Institute in Colombo.

== Honours ==
- Awarded the title of Deshamanya by the Sri Lankan Government

Diplomatic posts
Preceded by Tilak Goonaratne	Sri Lankan High Commissioner to the United Kingdom; 1965–1967	Succeeded by Noel Wimalasena
Preceded by ?	Sri Lankan High Commissioner to Canada; 1976–1980	Succeeded by ?
Preceded by ?	United Nations Special Envoy to the Middle East; 1980–1985	Succeeded by ?
