= Malalasekera =

Malalasekera (Sinhala: මලලසේකර, romanized: Malalasēkara) is a Sinhalese surname. Notable people with the surname include:

- Gunapala Malalasekera (1899–1973), Sri Lankan academic
- Vijaya Malalasekera (1945–2022), Sri Lankan cricketer

== Other uses ==
- Malalasekara Hall, a performing arts complex at Nalanda College in Sri Lanka
