= J. C. T. Kotelawala =

Ceylonese politician and lawyer

Hon. James Cornelius Thomas Kotelawala

Member of the Ceylon Parliament for Badulla
- In office 1947 – July 1960
- Preceded by: seat created
- Succeeded by: Stanley H. Abeysekera

5th Sri Lankan Ambassador to the Soviet Union
- In office 1969–1970
- Prime Minister: Dudley Senanayake
- Preceded by: M. V. P. Peiris
- Succeeded by: C. D. S. Siriwardene

Personal details
- Born: 16 December 1910
- Party: Lanka Sama Samaja Party
- Profession: Proctor

James Cornelius Thomas "Jack" Kotelawala (16 December 1910 – 1992) was a Ceylonese lawyer and politician.

== Early life and education ==
Kotelawala was born on 16 December 1910, in Hindagoda (Badulla District, Uva), the son of James Kotelawala, and the nephew of Sir Henry Kotelawala. He was educated at Uva College, Badulla and at Trinity College, Kandy before studying at the Ceylon Law College and qualified as a Proctor.

== Political career ==
He was recruited to the Youth League by Terence de Zylva and participated in the Suriya-Mal Movement in Kandy. Kotelawala was a founding member of the Lanka Sama Samaja Party in 1935, serving as the joint secretary and as a member of the Executive Committee between 1935 and 1940. He was appointed the party's general secretary between 1940 and 1942. He was jailed in 1942 for three years. Kotelawala served as the president of the Uva Motor Workers’ Union and the vice president of the All-Ceylon Estate Workers Union.

He was elected to parliament at the 1st parliamentary election held between 23 August 1947 and 20 September 1947, representing the LSSP, as the second member for the Badulla electorate. The first member, S. M. Subbaiah, representing the Ceylon India Congress received 27,121 votes (50% of the total vote) and Kotelawala 16,654 votes (31% of the total vote). The Badulla electoral district was one of five multi-member constituencies, with two members, the others were Ambalangoda-Balapitiya, Balangoda, Colombo Central and Kadugannawa.

He successfully retained his seat at the 2nd parliamentary election, held between 24 May 1952 and 30 May 1952, where he secured the position of first member, polling 12,450 votes (31% of the total vote), which was only 403 votes ahead of S. A. Peeris, who was elected as the second member for the Badulla electorate.

At the 3rd parliamentary elections, Kotelawala received 20,908 votes (46% of the total vote) over 6,000 votes in front of the United National Party candidate, S. A. Peeris, who polled 32.6% of the total vote.

Kotelawala lost the seat to the UNP candidate, B. H. Bandara, at the 4th parliamentary election held on 19 March 1960, when the electorate was changed to a single-member constituency. He lost by 276 votes, with Bandara polling 4,775 votes (37% of the total vote) against Kotewala's 4,499 votes (35% of the total vote). He chose not to contest the subsequent parliamentary election held on 20 July 1960.

He was expelled from the LSSP in 1969, when he was appointed as the Ambassador to the Soviet Union. He served as the chairman of the Ceylon Transport Board between 1975 and 1977.

Kotelawala joined the Sri Lanka Mahajana Party and served as its president between 1984 and 1992. He was the author of Amataka Novana Satahan [Memorable Events], which was published in Samasamaja Jayanthi Kalapaya [Samasamaja Jubilee Issue] (1960).

Diplomatic posts
Preceded by M. V. P. Peiris	Sri Lankan Ambassador to the Soviet Union; 1969–1970	Succeeded by C. D. S. Siriwardene
