= James Martensz =

James Martensz may refer to:

- James Aubrey Martensz (1885–1963), Ceylonese lawyer and politician
- James Adrianus Martensz (1825–1872), proctor and member of the Legislative Council of Ceylon
