= Dilan Perera =

Sri Lankan politician

Hon. Dilan Perera
- ඩිලාන් පෙරේරා திலன் பெரேரா

State Minister of Highways
- In office 9 September 2015 – November 2019
- President: Maithripala Sirisena
- Prime Minister: Ranil Wickremesinghe

State Minister of Housing and Samurdhi
- In office 22 March 2015 – 21 May 2015
- President: Maithripala Sirisena
- Prime Minister: Ranil Wickremesinghe

Member of Parliament for Badulla District
- In office 2020 – 24 September 2024
- In office 1994–2015

Member of Parliament for National List
- In office 2015–2019

Personal details
- Born: 19 April 1962 (age 64)
- Party: Sri Lanka Podujana Peramuna
- Other political affiliations: United People's Freedom Alliance
- Education: Royal College, Colombo
- Occupation: Politician
- Profession: Lawyer
- Website: http://www.dilanperera.com

Boddhiya Baduge Dilan Priyanjan Anslam Perera, MP (born 19 April 1962) is a Sri Lankan politician and former Member of Parliament from the Badulla District. He was the former State Minister of Highways, State Minister of Housing and Samurdhi, Non-Cabinet Minister of Port Development, and Deputy Minister of Justice.

== Early life and education ==
Born to Marshal Perera, PC and Daya Perera, he was educated at Royal College Colombo and studied at the Sri Lanka Law College.

== Political career ==
Perera entered politics in 1988, when he was elected to the Uva Provincial Council and served as leader of the opposition from 1993 to 1994. He was elected to parliament in the 1994 parliamentary elections and was served as Deputy Minister of Justice, Constitutional Affairs, Ethnic Affairs and National Integration between 1999 and 2000. Having been re-elected or appointed to parliament from the national list, Perera had served as Deputy Minister of Ports and Aviation, Deputy Minister of Media and Communication, Cabinet Minister of Estate Infrastructure, Minister of Ports and Ports Development, Minister of Foreign Employment Promotion and Welfare and State Minister of Highways.

== Controversies ==
In February 1997, he was involved in a shooting with political rivals in which parliamentarian Nalanda Ellawala was killed. In September 2018, he was accused of being linked to a person arrested in Milan for human smuggling, a link he strongly denied. That same month, he publicly admitted that some of the LTTE soldiers and civilians who surrendered in the Sri Lankan Civil War had been killed by Armed forces.

== Family ==
Perera was married to Saroja Sirisena, who served as Sri Lankan Ambassador to Germany and High Commissioner to the United Kingdom.
