= Tikiri Banda Subasinghe =

Sri Lankan politician (1913–1995)

Hon. Tikiri Banda Subasinghe

Minister of Industries and Scientific Affairs
- In office May 1970 – 1 March 1977
- Prime Minister: Sirimavo Bandaranaike
- Preceded by: Philip Gunawardena
- Succeeded by: Cyril Mathew

2nd Sri Lankan Ambassador to the Soviet Union
- In office 1961–1965
- Prime Minister: Sirimavo Bandaranaike
- Preceded by: Gunapala Piyasena Malalasekera
- Succeeded by: B. F. Perera

7th Speaker of the Parliament
- In office 30 March 1960 – 23 April 1960
- Prime Minister: Dudley Senanayake
- Preceded by: Hameed Hussain Sheikh Ismail
- Succeeded by: R. S. Pelpola

Parliamentary Secretary to the Minister of Defence and External Affairs
- In office 1956–1959
- Prime Minister: S. W. R. D. Bandaranaike
- Preceded by: V Nalliah
- Succeeded by: Felix R D Bandaranaike

Member of the Ceylonese Parliament for Bingiriya
- In office 1947 – July 1960
- Succeeded by: Leelananda Weerasinghe

Member of the Ceylonese Parliament for Katugampola
- In office 1965–1977
- Preceded by: Leelananda Weerasinghe
- Succeeded by: Gamini Jayawickrama Perera

Personal details
- Born: 14 August 1913 British Ceylon
- Died: 10 August 1995 (aged 81)
- Party: Sri Lanka Freedom Party (1965–1977)
- Other political affiliations: Lanka Sama Samaja Party (–1955); Independent Socialist Party (1955-1959); United National Party (1959); Independent (1960-1965)
- Spouse: Lolita
- Children: Swineetha, Sarojini
- Education: Ananda College

Subasinghe Mudiyanselage Tikiri Banda Subasinghe (14 August 1913 – 10 August 1995) was a Sri Lankan statesman. He was the 7th Speaker of the Parliament of Sri Lanka and Sri Lankan Ambassador to the Soviet Union He also served as Parliamentary Secretary to the Minister of Defence and External Affairs and Minister of Industries and Scientific Affairs.

== Life ==
While studying at the London School of Economics, Subasinghe attended the 5th Pan-African Congress, held in Manchester in October 1945, and helped to organize the All-Colonial Peoples' Conferences held in London around the same time. A founding member of the Lanka Sama Samaja Party (LSSP), Subasinghe entered parliament contesting the Bingiriya seat at the 1947 Parliamentary general elections.

With the 1956 general elections, he was appointed as Parliamentary Secretary to the Minister of External Affairs and Defence in the S. W. R. D. Bandaranaike cabinet. In 1960, he was unanimously elected Speaker of Parliament following the general elections in the short lived UNP led coalition government defeating veteran Speaker Sir. Albert F. Peiris both of whom represented from North Western Province.

Subasinghe was a prominent figure in the Suriya-Mal Movement which became the springboard for the Marxist and anti-imperialist movements in the country. He had two brothers (Vincent and Tudor Subasinghe) and two sisters.

== See also ==
- Sri Lankan Non Career Diplomats
- Tikiri Banda Subasinghe

Political offices
Preceded by Hameed Hussain Sheikh Ismail	Speaker of the Parliament; 1960	Succeeded by R. S. Pelpola
Diplomatic posts
Preceded by Gunapala Piyasena Malalasekera	Sri Lankan Ambassador to the Soviet Union; 1961–1965	Succeeded by B. F. Perera
