= J. L. Sirisena =

Sri Lankan planter and politician

Jasenthu Liyana Sirisena (born 16 October 1916) was a Sri Lankan planter and politician. He was the Minister of Social Services and member of Parliament of Sri Lanka from Bingiriya representing the United National Party.

Born in Ambalangoda, Sirisena was educated at Dharmasoka College. He became a planter and moved to Dummalasuriya, where he became a plantation manager of the Heemaliyagara Group owned by H.L. De Mel & Co for over thirty-five years. He contested the local government elections and was elected to the Dummalasuriya Village Council in 1951, having failed in 1948. Elected Chairman of the Village Council, he served for twenty one years. He was elected to parliament from Bingiriya in the 1965 general election. He lost his seat in the 1970 general election to L. B. Jayasena of the Sri Lanka Freedom Party. He won the 1977 general election and was appointed the first Deputy Minister of Social Services by J. R. Jayewardene, and in 1988, was appointed Minister of Social Services, by Ranasingha Premadasa.
