= List of ambassadors of Sri Lanka to Myanmar =

The Sri Lankan Ambassador to Myanmar is the Sri Lankan envoy to Myanmar.

== List of Minister and Envoy Extraordinary ==
- Sir Susantha de Fonseka (1949-1952)
- Sir Velupillai Coomaraswamy (1952-1954)
- A. E. Gunasinha (1954-1956)
- Raja Hewavitarne (1956-1960)

== List of Ambassadors ==
- Arthur Basnayake
- H. R. Piyasiri
- Nandimithra Ekanayake

== See also ==
- List of heads of missions from Sri Lanka
