= A. T. Moorthy =

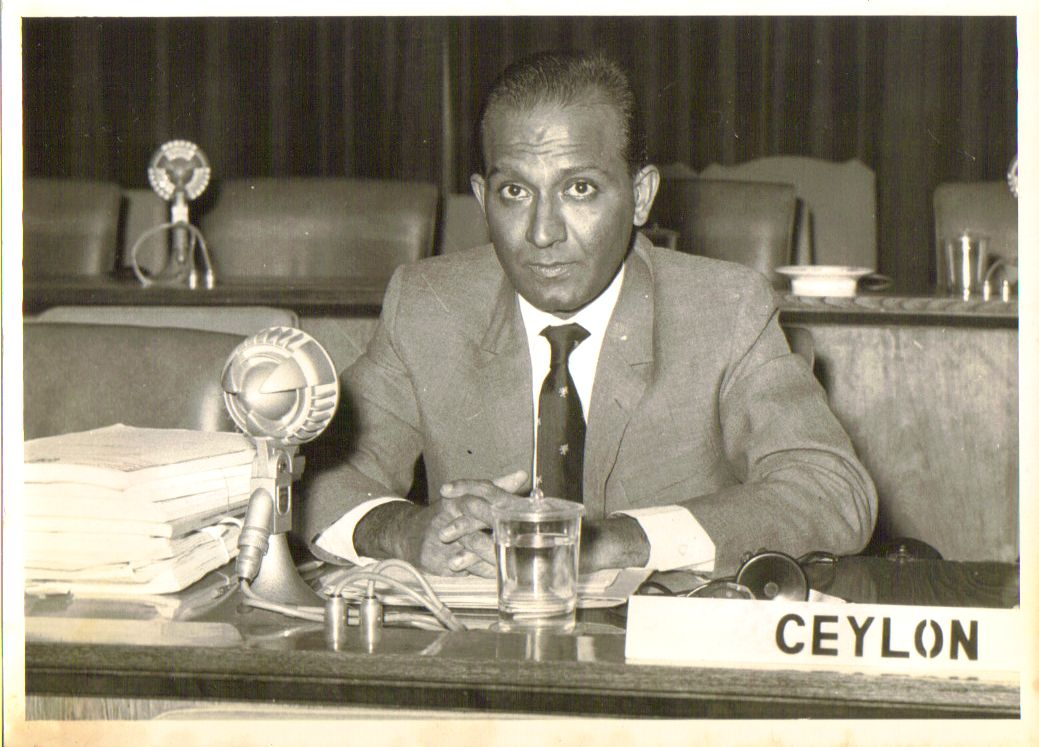

Sri Lankan High Commissioner to the United Kingdom
- In office January 1981 – May 1984
- Preceded by: Noel Wimalasena
- Succeeded by: Chandra Monerawela

Sri Lankan High Commissioner to Pakistan
- In office 1978–1981

Personal details
- Born: 10 August 1928 Batticaloa District, Ceylon
- Died: 1 April 2008 (aged 79) London, United Kingdom
- Education: University of Ceylon, Colombo
- Profession: Diplomat
- Ethnicity: Sri Lankan Tamil

Arambamoorthy Thedchana Moorthy (10 August 1928 – 1 April 2008) was a Sri Lankan Tamil diplomat and High Commissioner to the United Kingdom.

== Early life and family ==
Moorthy was born on 10 August 1928 in Batticaloa District in eastern Ceylon. He was educated at Sivananda Vidyalayam, Batticaloa and Jaffna College. After school he joined the University of Ceylon, Colombo, graduating in 1948 with a degree in economics.

Moorthy married Suseela, daughter of P. Sriskandarajah, in 1959. They had two daughters (Uma and Ima) and a son (Sri Ayilavan).

== Career ==
Moorthy joined the Ceylon Overseas Service in 1953 and his first diplomatic posting was in Jakarta, Indonesia. He became chargé d'affaires of the Ceylonese embassy in Beijing, China in 1957, meeting leaders such as Mao Zedong and Zhou Enlai. He was first secretary at the High Commission of Ceylon, London between 1961 and 1963. During this time Moorthy and Suseela studied for the bar at Gray's Inn. He was called to the bar in 1965.

Moorthy then served in various diplomatic positions: first secretary in West Germany (1964–66); chargé d'affaires in Thailand (1969–70); permanent representative to the United Nations Economic Commission for Asia and the Far East; and chargé d'affaires in Iraq (1970). He returned to Sri Lanka in 1974 to co-ordinate the fifth Non-Aligned Summit which was to be held in Colombo in 1976. He was appointed Ambassador to Pakistan in 1978 (also accredited to Iran). After the 1979 Iranian Revolution Moorthy played an important role in Sri Lankan government's attempts to free the US hostages in Iran.

In 1981 Moorthy was appointed High Commissioner to the United Kingdom. Back in Sri Lanka violence against the country's Tamils escalated, culminating in the Black July riots of 1983. Sinhalese expatriates living in the UK started a campaign to have Moorthy replaced by a Buddhist Sinhalese. He received a letter, allegedly from a member of the Sinhala Association in UK, threatening his life. The Sri Lankan government ordered Moorthy to declare that his appointment was evidence that there was no serious discrimination against the Tamils. Moorthy refused make such a declaration and resigned in 1984.

Moorthy and his family remained in the UK. He died on 1 April 2008 in London.
