= List of high commissioners of Sri Lanka to the United Kingdom =

High Commissioner of Sri Lanka to the United Kingdom
- Emblem of Sri Lanka
- Incumbent; Nimal Senadheera since 16 June 2025
- Ministry of Foreign Affairs
- Reports to: Minister of Foreign Affairs
- Seat: Sri Lankan High Commission, 13 Hyde Park Gardens, London, United Kingdom
- Nominator: The president of Sri Lanka
- Term length: No fixed term
- Inaugural holder: Sir Claude Corea (As Representative of the Government of Ceylon)
- Formation: 1946; 80 years ago
- Website: srilankahc.uk

The Sri Lankan high commissioner to the United Kingdom is the Sri Lankan envoy to United Kingdom. Countries belonging to the Commonwealth of Nations typically exchange high commissioners, rather than ambassadors. Though there are a few technical differences (for instance, whereas ambassadors present their diplomatic credentials to the host country's head of state, high commissioners are accredited to the head of government), they are in practice one and the same office. The Sri Lankan high commissioner to the United Kingdom is concurrently accredited as the ambassador to Ireland. The current post of high commissioner is occupied by Nimal Senadheera.

== List of high commissioners ==
=== Representatives of the Government of Ceylon ===
Representative	Start of term	End of term
Claude Corea	1946	1948

=== High commissioners ===
High Commissioner	Start of term	End of term
Claude Corea	1948	1949
Sir Oliver Goonetilleke	1949	1952
Sir Edwin Wijeyeratne	1952	1954
Sir Claude Corea	February 1954	December 1957
Gunasena de Soyza	December 1957	October 1958
P. R. Gunasekera	October 1958	February 1960
Gunasena de Soyza	February 1960	October 1961
Sir Senerat Gunewardene	October 1961	June 1963
Gunapala Malalasekera	June 1963	February 1967
Sir Lalitha Rajapakse	February 1967	October 1969
M. V. P. Peiris	October 1969	December 1970
Tilak Goonaratne	December 1970	1975 - Last High Commissioner from the Dominion of Ceylon (1970-72), and the first High Commissioner from Sri Lanka (1972-75).
Vernon Mendis	1975	1977
Noel Wimalasena	1977	January 1981
A. T. Moorthy	January 1981	May 1984
Chandra Monerawela	May 1984	March 1990
Sepala Attygalle	1990	August 1993
Cyril Ranatunge	August 1993	February 1995
S. K. Wickremasinghe	February 1995	January 1999
Lal Jayawardena	January 1999	July 2000
Mangala Moonesinghe	July 2000	April 2002
Faiz Mustapha	April 2002	February 2005
Kshenuka Senewiratne	February 2005	May 2008
Chandra Nihal Jayasinghe	May 2008	31 December 2010
Chris Nonis	1 September 2011	20 October 2014
Sugeeshwara Gunaratna (Acting)	21 October 2014	14 November 2016
Amari Mandika Wijewardane	15 November 2016	1 April 2018
Sugeeshwara Gunaratna (acting)	1 April 2018	20 February 2019
Manisha Gunasekara	20 February 2019	31 January 2020
Saroja Sirisena	02 March 2020	18 November 2023
Rohitha Bogollagama	19 November 2023	2 November 2024
Nimal Senadheera	16 June 2025	

=== Deputy high commissioners ===
- Sir Velupillai Coomaraswamy (1948-1953)
- Theodore Duncan Perera (1953-1956)
- B. F. Perera (1956-1958)

== See also ==
- High Commission of Sri Lanka, London
- List of heads of missions from Sri Lanka
