= List of ambassadors of France to Sri Lanka =

Ambassador of France to Sri Lanka
- Incumbent; Robichon Christine since 24 January 2010
- Style: His/Her Excellency
- Inaugural holder: Pinoteau
- Formation: 27 October 1948 (as Extraordinary Envoy and Plenipotentiary Minister)
- Website: French embassy in Sri Lankan

The French Ambassador to Sri Lanka was created on 27 October 1948 as the Extraordinary Envoy and Plenipotentiary Minister. The current ambassador is Jean-François Pactet who was inaugurated in November 2022.

== List ==
=== Extraordinary Envoy and Plenipotentiary Minister ===
- Pinoteau - 27 October 1948
- Robert Du Gardier - 6 July 1951
- Colin - 20 June 1953

=== Ambassador ===
- Same - (December 1958)
- Guibaut - (5 May 1959)
- Lance - (4 August 1961)
- Brionval - (26 March 1964)
- Chambon - (9 December 1968)
- Lambroschini - (4 August 1971)
- Anthonioz - (24 April 1975)
- Jacques Bourgoin - (23 January 1978)
- Toussaint - (19 September 1981)
- Morizot - (2 March 1984)
- Eluecque - (5 July 1986)
- Lambert - (8 December 1988)
- Jean-François Bouffandeau - (18 June 1992)
- Elisabeth Dahan - (11 March 1996)
- Marie-France Pagnier - (1 September 2000)
- Jean-Bernard De Vaivre - (25 September 2003 - August 2006)
- Lummaux Michel - (1 September 2006 - 18 December 2009)
- Robichon Christine - (24 January 2010 - 17 September 2013)
- Jean-Paul Monchau - (17 September 2013 - 8 April 2015)
- Jean-Marin Schuh - (8 April 2015 - 11 October 2018)
- Eric Lavertu - (1 November 2018- October 2022)
- Jean-François Pactet - (11 November 2022 - Present)

== See also ==
- Sri Lankan Ambassador to France
