= P. R. Gunasekera =

Sri Lankan lawyer and diplomat

Percival Reginald Gunasekera (5 March 1897 - ????) was a Sri Lankan lawyer and diplomat, who served as Sri Lankan High Commissioner to the United Kingdom and Australia.

Gunasekera gained a MA from the University of Cambridge and on his return studied law and became an Advocate. Starting his legal practice in the Unofficial bar. Between 1940 and 1944, he acted as a Magistrate. He joined the Ceylon Judicial Service in 1946. He served as an Acting Magistrate, Kalutara; Acting Additional District Judge, Kandy; District Judge, Tangalle; Additional Magistrate, Colombo; Acting Additional District Judge, Galle; Municipal Magistrate, Colombo and Additional District Judge, Kurunegala.

He joined the Ceylon Overseas Service when he succeeded James Aubrey Martensz as Ceylon High Commissioner to Australia in August 1955. In 1958, he moved to the Ceylon's Embassy in Paris as Minister. In October 1958 he succeeded Gunasena de Soyza as Ceylon's High Commissioner to the United Kingdom and served till February 1960 when he was succeeded by Gunasena De soyza.
