= List of ambassadors of Sri Lanka to the Soviet Union =

Sri Lankan Ambassador to the Soviet Union
- Style: His Excellency
- Inaugural holder: Gunapala Piyasena Malalasekera
- Formation: 1957 as Ceylonese Ambassador to the Soviet Union
- Final holder: Rodney Vandergert
- Succession: Sri Lankan Ambassador to Russia

The Sri Lankan Ambassador to the Soviet Union was the Sri Lankan envoy in Moscow (Ulitsa Shepkhina 24, Soviet Union) with concurrent, nonresident Diplomatic accreditation in Budapest, Bukarest, Prague, Warsaw and East Berlin.

== History ==
Diplomatic relations between the Soviet Union and Sri Lanka were established on February 19, 1957, and ceased following the breakup of the Soviet Union in 1991.

== Ambassadors ==
Ambassadors	Start of Term	End of Term	Head of State/Government
Gunapala Piyasena Malalasekera	1957	1961	S. W. R. D. Bandaranaike; Wijeyananda Dahanayake; Dudley Senanayake; Sirimavo Bandaranaike
Tikiri Banda Subasinghe	1961	1965	Sirimavo Bandaranaike
B. F. Perera	1965	1968	Dudley Senanayake
M. V. P. Peiris	1968	1969	Dudley Senanayake
J. C. T. Kotelawala	1969	1970	Dudley Senanayake; Sirimavo Bandaranaike
C. D. S. Siriwardene	1970	1974	Sirimavo Bandaranaike
C. E. S. Weeratunga	1974	1976	Sirimavo Bandaranaike
Walter Jayawardena	1977	1978	Sirimavo Bandaranaike; Junius Richard Jayewardene
R. C. A. Johnpulle	1978	1982	Junius Richard Jayewardene
Neville Kanakaratne	1982	1987	Junius Richard Jayewardene
Rodney Vandergert	1987	1991	Junius Richard Jayewardene; Ranasinghe Premadasa

== See also ==
- Sri Lankan Ambassador to Russia
- List of heads of missions from Sri Lanka
