= L. B. Jayasena =

Sri Lankan politician

Loku Balasuriyage Jayasena (16 January 1920 - 19??) was a Sri Lankan politician. He was the member of Parliament of Sri Lanka from Bingiriya representing the Sri Lanka Freedom Party.

He was elected to parliament from Bingiriya in the March 1960 general election and was re-elected from July 1960 general election. He lost is seat in the 1965 general election to J. L. Sirisena of the United National Party.
