= List of ambassadors and high commissioners of Sri Lanka =

This list includes Sri Lanka's serving ambassadors, high commissioners, permanent representatives, and other senior diplomatic representatives. High commissioners head diplomatic missions in Commonwealth of Nations member states, while ambassadors lead missions in other countries. The head of a mission to an international organisation is known as a permanent representative. All are appointed by the Ministry of Foreign Affairs and may include career diplomats, non-career diplomats, and members of the Sri Lanka Overseas Service.

== Ambassadors and high commissioners ==
As of 11 August 2026

Current ambassadors and high commissioners
Host country	Location	Type and website	Ambassador / High Commissioner	List	Ref.
Australia Accredited to: Fiji; Papua New Guinea; Samoa; Solomon Islands; Vanuatu	Canberra	High Commission	Yasoja Gunasekera	List	
Austria Accredited to: Bosnia and Herzegovina; Czech Republic; Hungary; Serbia; Slovakia; Slovenia; CTBTO; IAEA; UNIDO; UNODC	Vienna	Embassy and Permanent Mission	Dayani Mendis		
Bahrain	Manama	Embassy	Shanika Dissanayake		
Bangladesh	Dhaka	High Commission	Dharmapala Weerakkody		
Belgium Accredited to: Luxembourg; European Union	Brussels	Embassy	Chandana Weerasena		
Brazil Accredited to: Argentina; Chile; Colombia; Paraguay; Peru; Suriname; Uruguay	Brasília	Embassy	C. A. Chaminda I. Colonne		
Canada	Ottawa	High Commission	Mohamad Jauhar	List	
China Accredited to: North Korea; Mongolia	Beijing	Embassy	Majintha Jayesinghe	List	
Cuba Accredited to: Dominican Republic; Ecuador; El Salvador; Haiti; Honduras; Jamaica; Panama; Venezuela	Havana	Embassy	Mahinda Ratnayake	List	
Egypt Accredited to: Eritrea; Libya; Morocco	Cairo	Embassy	Sisira Senavirathne		
Ethiopia Accredited to: Djibouti; Somalia; African Union; UNECA	Addis Ababa	Embassy	Nirmala Indumathie Dias Paranavitana		
France Accredited to: Andorra; Monaco; Portugal; Spain; UNESCO; UN Tourism	Paris	Embassy	Sugeeshwara Gunaratna	List	
Germany Accredited to: Croatia; Montenegro; North Macedonia; Switzerland	Berlin	Embassy	Varuni Muthukumarana		
India	New Delhi	High Commission	Mahishini Colonne	List	
Indonesia Accredited to: ASEAN	Jakarta	Embassy	Sashikala Premawardhane		
Iran Accredited to: Azerbaijan; Turkmenistan	Tehran	Embassy	Mohamed Ibrahim Fazeeha Azmi		
Israel	Tel Aviv	Embassy	Saman Chandrasiri		
Italy Accredited to: Albania; Cyprus; Greece; Malta; San Marino; FAO; ICCROM; IFAD; WFP	Rome	Embassy	Satya Rodrigo		
Japan	Tokyo	Embassy	Pivithuru Janak Kumarasinghe		
Jordan	Amman	Embassy	J. A. D. S. Priyangika Wijegunasekara		
Kenya Accredited to: Benin; Burkina Faso; Democratic Republic of the Congo; Republic of the Congo; Côte d'Ivoire; Gabon; Gambia; Ghana; Guinea; Guinea Bissau; Liberia; Mali; Mauritania; Nigeria; Rwanda; Senegal; Sierra Leone; Tanzania; Togo; Uganda; South Sudan; UNEP; UN-Habitat	Nairobi	High Commission	Dhammika Fernando		
Kuwait	Kuwait City	Embassy	L. P. Ratnayaka		
Lebanon Accredited to: Syria	Beirut	Embassy	Anura Withanage		
Malaysia	Kuala Lumpur	High Commission	Dharshana M. Perera		
Maldives	Malé	High Commission	Mohamed Rizvi Hassen		
Myanmar	Yangon	Embassy	Prabashini Ponnamperuma		
Nepal	Kathmandu	Embassy	Ruwanthi Delpitiya		
Netherlands Accredited to: OPCW	The Hague	Embassy	Rekha Gunasekera		
New Zealand	Wellington	High Commission	W. G. S. Prasanna		
Nigeria	Abuja	High Commission	A. Sabarullah Khan		
Oman Accredited to: Yemen	Muscat	Embassy	W. A. K. S. De Alwis		
Pakistan Accredited to: Kyrgyzstan; Tajikistan	Islamabad	High Commission	Fred Senevirathne	List	
Philippines	Manila	Embassy	Chanaka Talpahewa		
Poland Accredited to: Bulgaria	Warsaw	Embassy	Priyangika Dharmasena		
Qatar	Doha	Embassy	R. S. Khan Azard		
Romania	Bucharest	Embassy	S. P. W. Pathirana		
Russia Accredited to: Armenia; Belarus; Kazakhstan; Moldova; Uzbekistan	Moscow	Embassy	Shobini Gunasekera	List	
Saudi Arabia	Riyadh	Embassy	O. L. Ameer Ajwad		
Seychelles Accredited to: Madagascar; Mauritius	Victoria	High Commission	Srimal Wickremasinghe		
Singapore	Singapore	High Commission	Senarath Dissanayake		
South Africa Accredited to: Angola; Botswana; Eswatini; Lesotho; Malawi; Mozambique; Namibia; Zambia; Zimbabwe	Pretoria	High Commission	Udeni Rajapaksa		
South Korea	Seoul	Embassy	M. K. Pathmanaathan		
Sweden Accredited to: Denmark; Estonia; Finland; Iceland; Latvia; Lithuania; Norway	Stockholm	Embassy	Kapila Fonseka		
Thailand Accredited to: Cambodia; Laos; UNESCAP	Bangkok	Embassy	Wijayanthi Edirisinghe		
Turkey Accredited to: Georgia; Ukraine	Ankara	Embassy	Niluka Kadurugamuwa		
United Arab Emirates Accredited to: Iraq; IRENA	Abu Dhabi	Embassy	Arusha Cooray		
United Kingdom	London	High Commission	Nimal Senadheera	List	
United States Accredited to: Antigua and Barbuda	Washington, D.C.	Embassy	Vacant	List	
Vietnam	Hanoi	Embassy	Poshitha Perera		

== Representatives to non-sovereign territories ==
As of 18 May 2026

Current representatives
Host terriotory	Location	Type and website	Representative	Ref.
Palestine	Ramallah	Representative Office	M. F. Mohamed Fawzer	

== Permanent representatives to international organisations ==
As of 18 February 2026

Current ambassadors and representatives
Host organisation	Location	Type and website	Ambassador/ Permanent Representative/ Consul General	List	Ref.
United Nations Accredited to: Bahamas; Belize; ISA	New York City	Permanent Mission	Jayantha Jayasuriya	List	
United Nations Accredited to: Holy See; Switzerland; WTO	Geneva	Permanent Mission and Consulate General	Sumith Dassanayake		

== Other senior diplomatic representatives ==
As of 3 March 2026

Current diplomatic representatives
Host country	Location	Type and website	Deputy High Commissioner/ Consul General	Ref.
Australia	Brisbane	Consulate General Accredited to: Queensland	Nalin Perera	
Australia	Melbourne	Consulate General Accredited to: South Australia; Tasmania; Victoria	Pradeepa Saram	
Australia	Perth	Consulate General Accredited to: Western Australia	Chirantha Weerawardena	
Canada	Toronto	Consulate General	Thushara Rodrigo	
China	Guangzhou	Consulate General	Suranga Algewatte	
China	Shanghai	Consulate General	Pamoda Gooneratne	
Cyprus	Nicosia	Consulate General	U. L. Niyas	
India	Chennai	Deputy High Commission	Ganesanathan Geathiswaran	
India	Mumbai	Consulate General	Kumaran Valsan Vethody	
Italy	Milan	Consulate General	Dilani Weerakoon	
Pakistan	Karachi	Consulate General	Jagath Abeywarna	
Saudi Arabia	Jeddah	Consulate General	Falah Alhabshi Mowlana	
United Arab Emirates	Dubai	Consulate General	Alexi Gunasekera	
United States	Los Angeles	Consulate General	Lalith P. Chandradasa	

== See also ==
- Foreign relations of Sri Lanka
- List of diplomatic missions of Sri Lanka
- List of diplomatic missions in Sri Lanka
- Visa policy of Sri Lanka
- Visa requirements for Sri Lankan citizens

== Notes ==
Sources
