= Arthur Basnayake =

Sri Lankan Ambassador

Arthur Basnayake (1 October 1925 – October 2015) was a Sri Lankan diplomat. He was the Ceylon's High Commissioner to India, Sri Lankan Ambassador to Myanmar and Japan.

Educated at Saint Joseph's College, Colombo and at the University of Ceylon where he read Geography. He joined the Ceylon Overseas Service in October 1949 as one of the first five to be recruited to the service and was posted to the Ministry of External Affairs and Defence. He was thereafter posted to Rangoon and then to Rome as official secretary. He was then posted as first secretary of the Ceylonese mission to the United Nations in New York. He thereafter served in the Ceylonese embassy in Washington, New Delhi and London having served as the deputy high commissioner to the United Kingdom. From 1974 to 1977, Basnayake was the Director General of foreign affairs at the Ministry of External Affairs and Defence in Colombo. In this capacity he played a major role in organizing the 5th Summit of the Non-Aligned Movement in Colombo in August 1976. He was appointed Ceylon's High Commissioner to India in 1977 and served till 1978. He thereafter served as Sri Lankan Ambassador to Myanmar and Japan. After his retirement from the Overseas Service, he worked as a professor of international relations at the Nagoya University. He was married to Damini Wickramasinghe.
