= L. S. B. Perera =

Sri Lankan civil servant

- Born: Leslie Simon Bernard Perera; 4 December 1910
- Died: Sri Lanka
- Occupation: Civil servant
- Spouse: Nimal Indrani de Fonseka

Leslie Simon Bernard Perera, CCS (born 4 December 1910, date of death unknown) was a Sri Lankan civil servant. A career officer of the Ceylon Civil Service, he was the Permanent Secretary of the Ministry of Health and the Ministry of Cultural Affairs and Social Services as Director Civil Aviation, he played a major role in the formation of Air Ceylon. Later he served as High Commissioners of Sri Lanka to Canada.

Having graduated with a BSc degree from the University of London, he passed the Ceylon Civil Service entrance exam in London and was appointed as a cadet by the Secretary of State in January 1935. On his return to Ceylon he was attached to the Colombo Kachcheri. He served as additional police magistrate of Colombo. In November 1935, he was attached to the Kalutara Kachcheri where he served as additional commission of request, additional police magistrate and office assistant. In 1937 he was appointed as office assistant, Kegalla Kachcheri; in 1938 assistant government agent, Kurunegala; in 1940, additional assistant government agent, Colombo; in 1941, assistant controller of imports, exports and exchange; in 1942, secretary to the minister of communication and works as well as deputy director of civil aviation and registrar of aircraft. In 1944, he was promoted as the first director of civil aviation and tasked with the formation of Air Ceylon which took place in 1947. He concurrently served at times as acting director of commerce, acting director of tourist bureau and acting controller of imports and exports. In 1942 he was appointed commissioner of lands and land commissioner. In 1953 he was appointed commissioner of motor traffic. In January 1958, he was appointed Permanent Secretary to the Ministry of Cultural Affairs and Social Services; and thereafter Permanent Secretary to the Ministry of Health in May 1961.

In 1967, he was appointed High Commissioner of Sri Lanka to Canada by prime minister Dudley Senanayake and served till 1970.

L. S. B. Perera married Nimal Indrani de Fonseka, daughter of Dr Fredrick Lionel de Fonseka and Regina Perera. A niece of Sir Susantha de Fonseka and a grand niece of W. A. de Silva. They had two children, Nimal Indrani Perera and Cecil Susantha Perera. A wealthy estate owner, Perera bread race horses and was a member of the Ceylon Turf Club and the St. John Ambulance Association (Ceylon Centre). He lived down Bagatall Road, Colombo 3. Perera is deceased.

== See also ==
- Sri Lankan Non Career Diplomats
