= Claude Corea =

Sri Lankan politician

The Honourable Sir Claude Corea KBE

President of the United Nations Security Council
- In office May 1960 – June 1960
- Preceded by: Mario Amadeo
- Succeeded by: Tsiang Tingfu

Ceylonese Representative to the United Nations
- In office 1958–1961
- Preceded by: Senerat Gunewardene
- Succeeded by: Gunapala Piyasena Malalasekera

High Commissioner for Ceylon to the United Kingdom
- In office 1954–1957
- Monarch: Elizabeth II
- Prime Minister: Sir John Kotelawala, S.W.R.D. Bandaranaike
- Preceded by: Edwin Wijeyeratne
- Succeeded by: Gunasena de Soyza

Ambassador of Ceylon to the United States
- In office 1948–1954
- Monarch: Elizabeth II
- Prime Minister: DS Senanayake, Dudley Senanayake, Sir John Kotelawala
- Preceded by: Office Created
- Succeeded by: Senerat Gunewardene

Ceylonese Representative to the United Kingdom
- In office 1946–1949
- Preceded by: Office Created
- Succeeded by: Oliver Ernest Goonetilleke

Minister of Labour, Industry and Commerce
- In office 1936–1946

Minister of Home Affairs
- In office 1933–1936

Personal details
- Born: 29 January 1894 Chilaw, British Ceylon
- Died: 2 September 1962 (aged 68) Germany
- Spouse: Lady Karmini Corea
- Children: Nihal, Harindra and Chandra
- Parent(s): Alfred Winzer Corea, Sarah Elizabeth Herat
- Education: Wesley College, Colombo
- Occupation: Politics, diplomat

Sir George Claude Stanley Corea, KBE (29 January 1894 – 2 September 1962) was a Sri Lankan politician and diplomat. Former President of the United Nations Security Council, he had served as the Ceylonese Minister of Labour, Industry and Commerce, the Ceylonese Ambassador to the United States, the Ceylonese High Commissioner to the United Kingdom and the Ceylonese Representative to the United Nations.

== Early life ==
Born on 29 January 1894 in the Western seaboard town of Chilaw, to Alfred Winzer Corea, a clerk in the Negombo Land Registry and to Sarah Elizabeth Herat. The Corea family were landed proprietors, who established the Chilaw Association. Stanley Corea who was educated at Wesley College, Colombo took over managing the family land holdings.

== Political career ==
Entering colonial era politics, Corea was elected to the State Council of Ceylon in 1931 general elections from his hometown of Chilaw. During this time he briefly served as acting Minister of Home Affairs in 1933. He was re-elected in the 1936 general election and was elected Minister of Labour, Industry and Commerce in the Second Board of Ministers of Ceylon serving from 1936 to 1946. He was elected to the presidency of the Ceylon National Congress (CNC) in 1932, 1939 and 1941. During World War II, he was of the view that the CNC should not lobbying for "mere constitutional reforms", but should seek transfer of sovereignty to the people of Ceylon. He served as chairman of the board of Ministers Sub Committee charged with resolving post-war problems in 1945 and was viewed as a potential first prime minister of Ceylon.

== Diplomatic career ==
However, he resigned from the State Council to take up appointment as Ceylon Government's representative to the United Kingdom on 24 September 1946. On 1 October 1948, he was appointed Ceylon's first Ambassador to the United States. During this period he attended the 5th session of FAO in Washington DC from 21 November to 6 December 1949. Records in the Truman Library reveal that Sir Claude visited the President on 1 March 1949 and again on 21 July 1952, the dates roughly marking his period as Ambassador of Ceylon in the United States. He was knighted in the 1952 Birthday Honours as a Knight Commander of the Order of the British Empire (KBE).

Corea was thereafter appointed as High Commissioner of Ceylon in United Kingdom on 16 February 1954. He was given concurrent accreditation to France and the Netherlands in January 1956. He served as High Commissioner at the Court of St. James until 1958.

=== Post-war relations with Japan ===
On 8 September 1951, the Treaty of Peace with Japan was signed in San Francisco. Junius Richard Jayewardene (later President Jayewardene), Sir Claude Corea and R. G. Senanayake signed on behalf of Ceylon. J. R. Jayewardene and Corea, kinsmen and colleagues, worked closely with Dean Acheson and John Foster Dulles, on the American side, to stem an undercurrent at the meeting of Asian resentment against Japanese wartime aggression.

President Reagan made reference to this at the welcoming ceremony for President J. R. Jayewardene on the White House Lawn on 18 June 1984. He said "understanding and appreciating your personal commitment to democratic ideals, Mr. President, it is a pleasure for us to have you as our guest. You underscored this heartfelt commitment during your first visit here in September 1951, during a gathering of the representatives of nations who had fought in the Pacific war. Some at that San Francisco conference insisted that Japan should not be given its full freedom. They argued that Japan should remain shackled as a punishment for its role in World War II. As the representative of Sri Lanka, you spoke out for the principle of freedom for all people, including the Japanese. You quoted Buddha, the great teacher, and said that "hatred ceases not by hatred, but by love."

=== Multilateral diplomacy ===
He was drawn increasingly into multilateral diplomacy in this period, being appointed as Chairman of the UN Interim Committee on International Commodity Arrangements of GATT at its 10th session, in 1955 – having been associated with GATT from its inception. Ceylon only became a member of the United Nations on 14 December 1955. In August 1956 he participated in the 22-power London conference that discussed the brewing Suez Crisis, before travelling to China.

On 8 September 1956 he arrived in Beijing as Special Ambassador to China, at the head of a Ceylon Government Delegation that was to have preliminary discussions with the Government of the People's Republic of China regarding the establishment of diplomatic relations, trade expansion, economic co-operation and cultural exchanges. The delegation included Sir Susantha de Fonseka, K.B.E., Mr. T.B.Subasinghe, M.P., Parliamentary Secretary to the Minister of Defence and External Affairs and Mr. R. Coomaraswamy, Senior Assistant Secretary, Ministry of Finance. Mr Coomaraswamy subsequently became Deputy Administrator of UNDP and the other two members became cabinet ministers.

The Suez Crisis boiled over after this Chinese interlude, in the period 5 November to 22 December 1956. Sir Claude chaired the 12th session of GATT in October 1957 in the Palais des Nations in Geneva. He was next appointed as Representative to the United Nations in June 1958 and was in office in September of that year when Prime Minister Solomon W. R. D. Bandaranaike was assassinated in Ceylon. Among those who called to offer condolences were Mr. Vazili Kuzanesov, Soviet Deputy Foreign Minister and Mr. V. K. Krishna Menon, India's Defence Minister. Bandaranaike's widow, Sirimavo Bandaranaike, became Prime Minister in July 1960.

In 1960 Sir Claude Corea reflected on the irony behind Secretary of State Christian Archibald Herter's remark that it was "wholly possible" for Red China to be invited to disarmament discussions, asking wryly whether "if they are not considered good enough to take their place in the U.N., would they be good enough to sit around the disarmament table?" Sir Claude seems to have caught the attention of the Republican National Committee: Documents pertaining to him are to be found in Box 628 of the Dwight D. Eisenhower Library under the rubric "Corea, Claude (Sir) – Ceylon – Chairman U. N. 1st Political Committee."

=== President of the UN Security Council ===
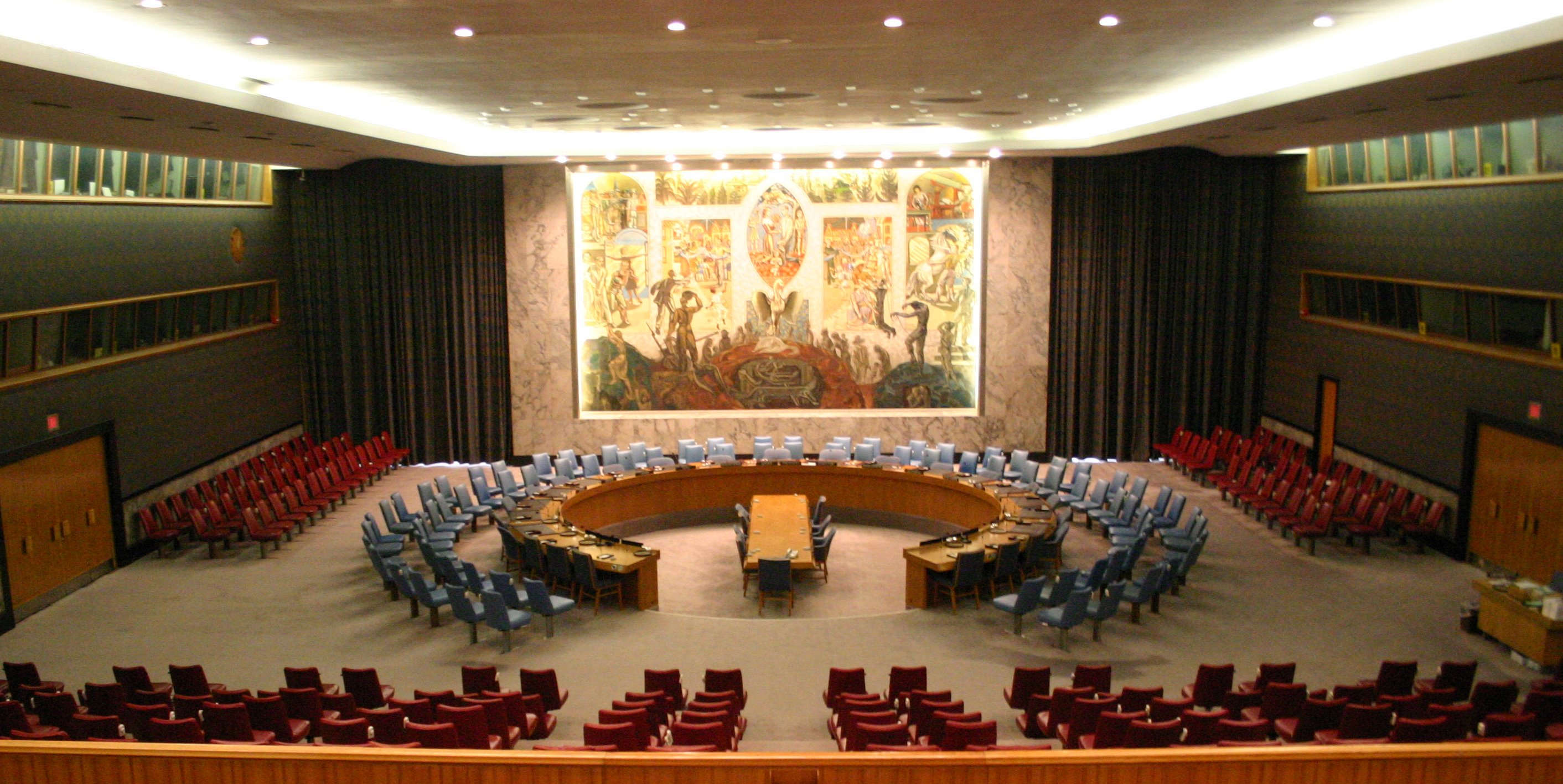
Sir Claude Corea created history by becoming the first ever President of the United Nations Security Council from Ceylon in 1960.

Sir Claude Corea became President of the UN Security Council in May 1960. On the first day of his presidency Francis Gary Power's Lockheed U-2 plane was forced down onto Soviet territory and he was captured.

The presidential race was under way at this time and the Democratic contender, Senator John F. Kennedy, visited Sir Claude in his apartment, for consultation. On 25 May 1960, closing a politically stormy month, Sir Claude told the Security Council: "We hold that, at the present time, it is a rule of international law that the air space over the territory of any country belongs to that country and cannot be violated without a breach of international law. ..." The International Civil Aviation Organization negotiated an international agreement which was signed in Chicago in 1944. The signatories, who were sovereign states, big and small, accepted in that agreement the principle of the sovereign right of each state to the air space over its territory. Among the big states which subscribed to this principle is the United States..." He pointed out that " ... secretly, there have been violations of this principle for the purpose of espionage" and that espionage has “… existed for centuries and will continue as long as human frailties continue, and will last as long as states suspect each other, fear each other and seek to dominate each other. But espionage is carried out in darkness, shunning publicity as if it were ashamed of its ugliness. We suppose it is considered necessary in the so-called civilized society of today, although the act itself is demoralizing and degrading."

== Family ==
Sir Claude married Lilie Karmini Chitty (born 1889), daughter of James Morel Chitty, Crown Counsellor and son of Christian S. Chitty of 42 Silversmith St., Kotahena and Chilaw and his French Huguenot wife, Matilda Augusta "Mitzi" Morel. Lady Corea sported a diamond nose stud and is reported famously to have responded to a journalist's query as to why she wore a diamond on her nose thus: "I prefer diamonds to sapphires". The journalist had been visiting the United Nations at the time.

The Clementine Paddleford papers in the Kansas State University Archives and Manuscripts have an intriguing entry: "Corea, Lady Karmini, wife to Sir Claude Corea, Ceylon's, United Nations Ambassador – 'A Fashion Note at U.N.,’ n.d". under "People, 1932–1967".

== Death ==
The John F. Kennedy Library records that "Sir Claude Corea, former Ceylonese diplomat, died" on 2 September 1962 in Germany. Lady Corea survived Sir Claude by over 35 years, living a simple life in Colombo, wearing only simple white cotton saris after she had been widowed. There is a photographic portrait of Lady Corea (by Elliot & Fry 1954) in the National Portrait Gallery, London along with one of Sir George Claude Corea. Sir Claude and Lady Corea had three children: Nihal, Harindra and Chandra. The late Hon. Harindra Corea was a Minister of Telecommunications in the Government of President Ranasinghe Premadasa. He was appointed Deputy Foreign Minister by President Chandrika Kumaratunga in 2000.
