= List of high commissioners of Sri Lanka to Canada =

The Sri Lankan high commissioner to Canada is the Sri Lankan envoy to Canada. Countries belonging to the Commonwealth of Nations typically exchange high commissioners, rather than ambassadors. Though there are a few technical differences (for instance, whereas ambassadors present their diplomatic credentials to the host country's head of state, high commissioners are accredited to the head of government), they are in practice one and the same office. Sri Lanka also maintains a consul-general in Toronto.

== High commissioners ==
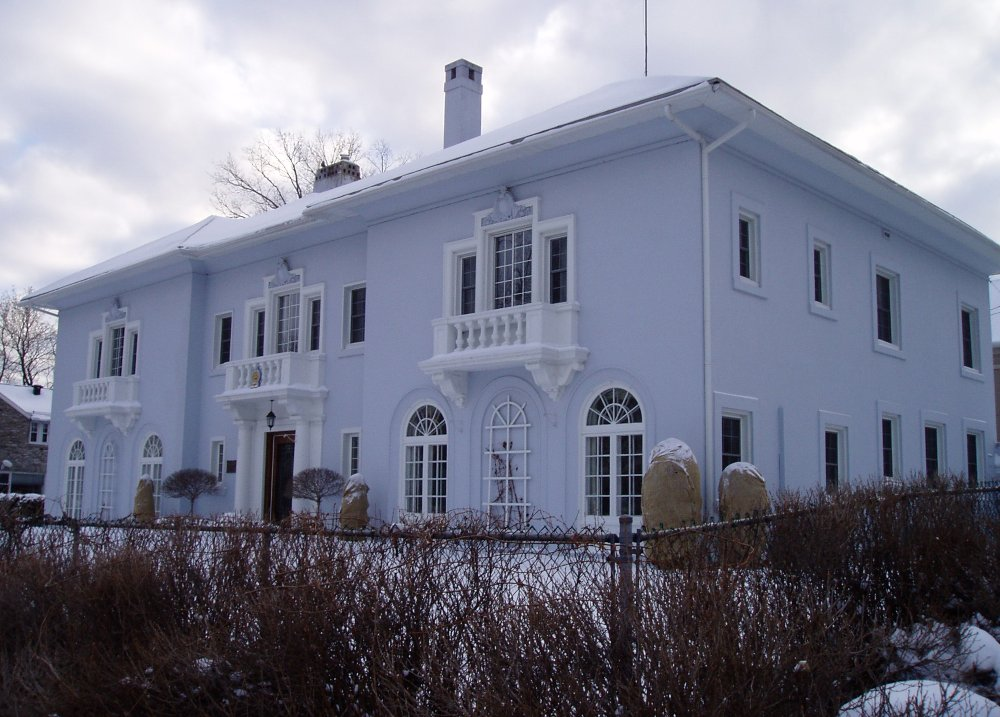
The residence of the Sri Lankan high commissioner in Ottawa, Ontario, Canada

Name	Period	Title	Presented credentials	Ref
Velupillai Coomaraswamy	1958–1961	High Commissioner	14 March 1958	
Gunapala Piyasena Malalasekera	1961–1963	High Commissioner	October 1961	
Senarat Gunawardene	1963–1965	High Commissioner	25 July 1963	
L. S. B. Perera	1965–1969	High Commissioner	29 September 1965	
Glanville S. Peiris	1969–1970	High Commissioner	20 October 1969	
P. H. William de Silva	1970–1974	High Commissioner	14 October 1970	
Vernon L. B. Mendis	1974–1975	High Commissioner	3 May 1974	
Henry W. Tambiah	1975–1977	High Commissioner	29 September 1975	
M.P.M.D.Fernando	1978	Acting High Commissioner	2 January 1978	
Ernest Corea	1978–1980	High Commissioner	15 August 1978	
Rodney C. A. Vandergert	1980–1983	High Commissioner	14 October 1980	
Punchi Banda Gunatillaka Kalugalla	1984–1986	High Commissioner	6 April 1984	
General Tissa Indraka Weeratunga	1986–1989	High Commissioner	21 May 1986	
Walter Gregory Rupesinghe	1989–1993	High Commissioner	26 September 1989	
Walter E. Fernando	1993–1996	High Commissioner	24 March 1993	
Ananda C. Gunasekera	1996–2000	High Commissioner	16 September 1996	
M.N.Geethangani De Silva	2001–2005	High Commissioner	5 March 2001	
Wijesinghe Jinasena S. Karunaratne	2006–2008	High Commissioner	13 June 2006	
Dayananda Rupasoma Perera	2008–2009	High Commissioner	22 October 2008	
Chitranganee Wagiswara	2010–2014	High Commissioner	29 January 2010	
Ahmed Aflel Jawad	2015–2018	High Commissioner	10 September 2015	
Madukande Asoka Kumara Girihagama	2018–2020	High Commissioner	13 November 2018	
Harsha Kumara Navaratne Weraduwa	2021–2024	High Commissioner	7 December 2021	
Uthman Lebbe Mohammed Jauhar	2024–2025	High Commissioner	13 September 2024	
Kiritharan Kumarasamy	2025–Present	Acting High Commissioner	August 2025	

== See also ==
- List of heads of missions from Sri Lanka
