= Badulla Electoral District (1947–1989) =

Electoral district of Sri Lanka

Badulla electoral district was an electoral district of Sri Lanka between August 1947 and February 1989. The district was named after the town of Badulla in Badulla District, Uva Province. The Badulla electoral district was one of five multi-member constituencies, with two members, the others were Ambalangoda-Balapitiya, Balangoda, Colombo Central and Kadugannawa.

The 1978 Constitution of Sri Lanka introduced the proportional representation electoral system for electing members of Parliament. The existing 160 mainly single-member electoral districts were replaced with 22 multi-member electoral districts. Badulla electoral district was replaced by the Badulla multi-member electoral district at the 1989 general elections, the first under the proportional representation system, though Badulla continues to be a polling division of the multi-member electoral district.

== Members of Parliament ==
Key

Independent LSSP SLFP UNP

Election	Member 1	Party	Term	Member 2	Party	Term
1947	S. M. Subbaiah	CIC	1947 - 1952	J. C. T. Kotelawala	LSSP	1947 - 1952
1952	J. C. T. Kotelawala	LSSP	1952 - 1960	S. A. Peeris		1952 - 1960
1956	J. C. T. Kotelawala	LSSP	1952 - 1960	S. A. Peeris	UNP	1952 - 1960
1960 (March)	B. H. Bandara	SLFP	1960 - 1977			
1960 (July)	B. H. Bandara	SLFP	1960 - 1977			
1965	B. H. Bandara	SLFP	1960 - 1977			
1970	B. H. Bandara	SLFP	1960 - 1977			
1977	D. Vincent Perera	UNP	1977 - 1989			

== Elections ==
=== 1947 Parliamentary General Election ===
Results of the 1st parliamentary election held between 23 August 1947 and 20 September 1947:

Candidate	Party	Symbol	Votes	%
S. M. Subbaiah	Ceylon Indian Congress	Cartwheel	27,121	50.22
J. C. T. Kotelawala	Lanka Sama Samaja Party	Hand	16,654	30.84
G. B. Katugaha		Elephant	6,585	12.19
V. Gnanapandithan		Scales	1,319	2.44
Valid Votes			51,679	95.69
Rejected Votes			2,326	4.31
Total Polled			54,005	100.00
Registered Electors			43,396	
Turnout				124.45

=== 1952 Parliamentary General Election ===
Results of the 2nd parliamentary election held between 24 May 1952 and 30 May 1952:

Candidate	Party	Symbol	Votes	%
J. C. T. Kotelawala	Lanka Sama Samaja Party	Hand	12,450	31.32
S. A. Peeris		Wheel	12,047	30.31
S. B. Ekanayake		Pineapple	6,559	16.50
M. L. Packir Saibo		Key	3,405	8.56
T. D. Alexander		Star	2,640	6.64
K. B. H. Adhikaritilaka		Lamp	781	1.96
Valid Votes			37,882	95.29
Rejected Votes			1,871	4.71
Total Polled			39,753	100.00
Registered Electors			28,151	
Turnout				1.41

=== 1956 Parliamentary General Election ===
Results of the 3rd parliamentary election held between 5 April 1956 and 10 April 1956:

Candidate	Party	Symbol	Votes	%
J. C. T. Kotelawala	Lanka Sama Samaja Party	Key	20,908	46.35
S. A. Peeris	United National Party	Elephant	14,724	32.64
S. B. Ekanayake		Umbrella	6,736	14.93
K. D. Sugathadasa		Cartwheel	1,301	2.88
Valid Votes			43,669	96.82
Rejected Votes			1,435	3.18
Total Polled			45,104	100.00
Registered Electors			35,607	
Turnout				1.27

=== 1960 (March) Parliamentary General Election ===
Results of the 4th parliamentary election held on 19 March 1960:

Candidate	Party	Symbol	Votes	%
B. H. Bandara	United National Party	Hand	4,775	37.02
J. C. T. Kotelawala	Lanka Sama Samaja Party	Key	4,499	34.88
Liliyan Peiris	Sri Lanka Freedom Party	Elephant	3,549	27.51
Valid Votes			12,823	99.40
Rejected Votes			77	0.60
Total Polled			12,900	100.00
Registered Electors			16,564	
Turnout				77.88

=== 1960 (July) Parliamentary General Election ===
Results of the 5th parliamentary election held on 20 July 1960:

Candidate	Party	Symbol	Votes	%
B. H. Bandara	Sri Lanka Freedom Party	Hand	6,545	53.23
Stanley H. Abeysekera	United National Party	Elephant	5,674	46.15
Valid Votes			12,219	99.38
Rejected Votes			76	0.62
Total Polled			12,295	100.00
Registered Electors			16,564	
Turnout				74.23

=== 1965 Parliamentary General Election ===
Results of the 6th parliamentary election held on 22 March 1965:

Candidate	Party	Symbol	Votes	%
B. H. Bandara		Hand	9,358	52.31
H. M. Jinadasa		Elephant	8,107	45.32
Percy Wijekoon		Aeroplane	356	1.99
Valid Votes			17,821	99.63
Rejected Votes			67	0.37
Total Polled			17,888	
Registered Electors			21,630	
Turnout				82.70

=== 1970 Parliamentary General Election ===
Results of the 7th parliamentary election held on 27 May 1970:

Candidate	Party	Symbol	Votes	%
B. H. Bandara		Hand	12,288	58.27
J. Hennayake		Elephant	8,700	41.25
Valid Votes			20,988	99.52
Rejected Votes			101	0.48
Total Polled			21,089	100.00
Registered Electors			25,411	
Turnout				82.99

=== 1977 Parliamentary General Election ===
Results of the 8th parliamentary election held on 21 July 1977:

Candidate	Party	Symbol	Votes	%
D. Vincent Perera	Sri Lanka Freedom Party	Elephant	10,490	55.90
B. H. Bandara	United National Party	Hand	6,784	36.15
Charles Senanayake		Key	1,320	7.03
T. S. Miskin		Lamp	103	0.55
Valid Votes			18,697	99.63
Rejected Votes			70	0.37
Total Polled			18,767	100.00
Registered Electors			22,315	
Turnout				84.10
