= Senake Bandaranayake =

Sri Lankan archeologist (1938-2015)

Professor Senake Bandaranayake
- Born: 1938; Sri Lanka
- Died: March 2, 2015 (aged 76–77); Sri Lanka
- Occupation: Archeologist
- Years active: 1974–2015
- Title: Vice chancellor, Emeritus professor
- Spouse: Manel Fonseka
- Parent: William Dias Bandaranayake
- Awards: Sahitya Akademi Fellowship

Academic background
- Education: Ph.D
- Alma mater: University of Oxford

Academic work
- Discipline: Archeologist
- Institutions: University of Kelaniya

Senake Dias Bandaranayake (1938 – March 2, 2015) was a Sri Lankan archeologist, who served as emeritus professor and vice chancellor at University of Kelaniya. His research was focused on architecture, art history, and ancient paintings of South Asia, including Sri Lanka.

== Early life and education ==
He was born in 1938 to Dora and William Dias Bandaranayake. He was married to Manel Fonseka.

He received his early education at S. Thomas' College, Mount Lavinia. He graduated from Bristol University and later went to England where he obtained his Bachelor of Letters in 1965 and Ph.D. in 1972 from the University of Oxford. After obtaining his Ph.D., he attended UCL Institute of Archaeology where he received a post graduate degree.

== Career ==
After returning from Europe in 1974, he joined University of Kelaniya in 1975 as a senior lecturer at its archeology department until he retired as a senior professor in 2003. He later became emeritus professor, head of archeology department, and vice chancellor. He established Postgraduate Institute of Archaeology in 1987 and served as its director until 1997.

Prior to his retirement, he formed archaeological team at University of Kelaniya for graduate students to conduct research. He worked at Sigiriya for eighteen years, during which he built monumental work of Harry Charles Purvis Bell and Senarath Paranavithana.

=== Diplomatic career ===
He served in various capacities during his diplomatic career, including Ambassadors of Sri Lanka to France and to UNESCO in 1999, and Ambassadors of Sri Lanka to Bhutan. He was also appointed Sri Lankan High Commissioner to India from 2000 to 2002. During his diplomatic career, he established National Centre for Advocacy Studies (NCAS), an advocacy resource institute in South Asia.

He was one of the three final candidates nominated by the government of Sri Lanka for the post of Director General of the United Nations Educational, Scientific and Cultural Organization (UNESCO).

== Death ==
He died in his sleep on March 2, 2015.

== Awards ==
He was awarded Sahitya Akademi Fellowship in 1996 by the Sahitya Akademi in recognition of his contribution to archeology, and establishing Postgraduate Institute of Archaeology.

== Legacy ==
The government of Sri Lanka established Prof. Senaka Bandaranaike Archaeological Field Training School at Sigiriya named after Senaka Bandaranaike. It was inaugurated by the Mahinda Rajapaksa, prime minister of the country. The training institute establishment contract is signed by Central Cultural Fund at LKR50 million. The institute is claimed to be the premier training center of Sri Lanka for local and foreign archeological researchers.

== Research and publications ==
- In 1984, he wrote on The Peopling of Sri Lanka: The National Question and Some Problems of History and Ethnicity followed by Black July.
- In 1986, he wrote masterpiece with photographer Gamini Jayasinghe titled The Rock and Wall Paintings of Sri Lanka.
- As part of the UNESCO Maritime Silk Route Expedition, he was a co-editor of the Silk Road of the Sea in 1990.
- In 1993, he was also co-editor of archeological research titled Heritage of Asia and Oceania for the 10th General Assembly of International Council on Monuments and Sites help in Colombo.
- In 1996, along with his wife Manel Fonseka, he published Ivan Peries Paintings 1938-88, consisting a detailed monograph on his friend Ivan Peries.
- In 2007, he wrote Architecture of the Anuradhapura Period, consisting the art and archaeology of Sri Lanka.
- In 2007, he also wrote Ancient and Early Maps, the 2nd edition of the National Atlas of Sri Lanka, which was later published by the Survey Department of Sri Lanka.
- In 2009, he co-published Sri Lankan Painting in the 20th Century, an introduction to contemporary painting, in collaboration with Albert Dharmasiri. It was published by the National Trust Sri Lanka.
- In 2011, he published a collection of poetry titled Travellers Have Eyes, illustrated by Jagath Weerasinghe.
- In 2012, he published an anthology of his writings titled Continuities and Transformations: Studies in Sri Lankan Archaeology and History.
