= List of ambassadors of Sri Lanka to Cuba =

The Sri Lankan Ambassador to Cuba is the Sri Lankan envoy to Cuba. The Sri Lankan Ambassador to Cuba is concurrently accredited as Ambassador to Venezuela, El Salvador, Dominican Republic and Jamaica. The current ambassador starting from 2025 is R.M Mahinda Ratnayake.

== Ambassadors ==
- William Gopallawa (Dual accreditation as Ceylon's Ambassador to the United States)
- Ernest Corea (Dual accreditation as Sri Lankan Ambassador to the United States)
- Vice Admiral Asoka de Silva
- Tamara Kunanayakam (2009 - 2011)
- K. S. C. Dissanayake
- Admiral Nishantha Ulugetenne (2024 - 2024 December)
- R.M. Mahinda Ratnayake (2025 - Present)

== See also ==
- List of heads of missions from Sri Lanka
