= Tamara Kunanayakam =

Sri Lankan diplomat

Permanent Representative of Sri Lanka to the United Nations at Geneva
- In office 9 August 2011 – 2013
- President: Mahinda Rajapaksa
- Preceded by: Kshenuka Seneviratne

Sri Lankan Ambassador to Cuba
- In office 2009–2011
- President: Mahinda Rajapaksa

Sri Lankan Ambassador to Holy See
- In office 15 December 2011 – 2013
- President: Mahinda Rajapaksa
- Preceded by: T. B. Maduwegedara

Personal details
- Born: Colombo, Sri Lanka
- Education: Ladies College, Colombo; Vembadi Girls' High School; University of Heidelberg; IHEID

Tamara Manimekhalai Kunanayakam is a Sri Lankan diplomat. She was the former Permanent Representative of Sri Lanka to the United Nations Office at Geneva and Sri Lankan Ambassador to Holy See.

== Early life ==
Kunanayakam was born in and grew up in Colombo, Sri Lanka. Her father was an Anglican Sri Lankan Tamil from Chundikuli in Jaffna who was a member of the Lanka Sama Samaja Party and the Government Clerical Services Union. Her mother was a Hindu Indian Tamil from Badulla. Kunanayakam's maternal grandfather Gnanapandithan was a businessman in Badulla who had sympathies for the Indian National Congress and the Indian independence movement.

Kunanayakam was educated at Ladies College, Colombo and briefly at Vembadi Girls' High School in Jaffna. She became proficient in Tamil, Sinhala and English. In 1972, aged 19, she left Sri Lanka and travelled overland to Europe. She had intended to go to Netherlands but ended up in Switzerland. She worked in Geneva before going to Germany and enrolling at the University of Heidelberg. She graduated with a Bachelor's degree in Economics and International Relations. She then returned to Geneva and enrolled at the Graduate Institute of International and Development Studies. She graduated in 1982 with a Master's degree in International Relations. Her widowed mother and brothers moved to Geneva in 1983.

Kunanayakam is fluent in Tamil, Sinhala, English, French, German and Spanish.

== Career ==
After her graduation in 1982, Kunanayakam joined the United Nations Development Program (UNDP) in Geneva, where she worked until 1983. Between 1983 and 1984 she served as a consultant and policy adviser to the Lutheran World Federation. In late July 1983 she sent a fax to the Lutheran World Federation delegates attending the World Council of Churches conference in Vancouver, appraising them of the recent anti-Tamil riots that had occurred in Sri Lanka:

Just received news that Valvettiturai town has been razed and all inhabitants killed. Navy has killed 1,000 in Trincomalee. Two refugee camps in Colombo have been attacked. Food supplies of Jaffna are being blocked by the Army. Our sources of information are UNDP Colombo, NORAD Colombo and Tamil Information Centre London.

The fax was leaked to the media, some of whom mentioned Kunanayakam's name. Kunanayakam was accused of being an "Eelam propagandist". She also supplied information on the riots to World Vision International who presented some of them to Junius Richard Jayewardene, President of Sri Lanka. Jayewardene branded Kunanayakam a "terrorist agent" who had supplied false information.

Kunanayakam was a researcher for the International Peace Research Institute, Oslo (1984–85) and Antenna International, Geneva (1985–86). She was also a consultant to the UNDP in sub-Saharan Africa in 1985. She returned to the Lutheran World Federation in 1986 and worked there until 1988. In March 1987 Kunanayakam represented the World Student Christian Movement at the 43rd session of the UN Commission on Human Rights and spoke about the torture, disappearances, illegal detentions and other abuses prevalent in Sri Lanka at that time.

Kunanayakam was a human rights officer for the United Nations Centre for Human Rights from 1989 to 1990. In 1991 she became a research fellow at the Institute for Interdisciplinary Research, Heidelberg. She was then a research officer at the International Labour Organization (1991–93 and head of the department for development of policy at Bread for All, Bern (1993–94). She was first officer at the Office of the High Commissioner for Human Rights from 1994 to 2005, heading a unit on disappearances.

Kunanayakam was appointed as Minister Counsellor to the Embassy of Sri Lanka in Brazil in 2007. She was Sri Lanka's Ambassador to Cuba from 2009 to 2011. In 2011, she was appointed the Permanent Representative of Sri Lanka to the United Nations Office at Geneva and Sri Lankan Ambassador to Holy See. Kunanayakam was elected Chairperson/Rapporteur of the United Nations Intergovernmental Working Group on the Right to Development in August 2011 and as Vice Chair representing the Asia Group of countries at the United Nations Conference on Trade and Development (UNCTAD) at its 58th Session.

== Other activities ==
Kunanayakam is the founder of the Foundation on Multilateralism in Geneva and a founding member of the Observatory of Globalization in Paris, the South Group in Geneva and the Asia-Pacific Task Force, Geneva. She is author of several publications on international relations, including on the international monetary system, the Multilateral Agreement on Investment, the United Nations reform process, and humanitarian interventions in Yugoslavia, Iraq, and Afghanistan.

Diplomatic posts
Preceded by Kshenuka Seneviratne	Permanent Representative of Sri Lanka to the United Nations at Geneva; 2011–present	Incumbent
Preceded by ?	Sri Lankan Ambassador to Cuba; 2009–2011	Succeeded by ?
Preceded by T. B. Maduwegedara	Sri Lankan Ambassador to Holy See; 2011–present	Incumbent
