= S. M. Subbaiah =

Sri Lankan politician (1912-?)

Hon. Sangaralingam Muniandi Pillai Subbaiah MP

Member of the Ceylon Parliament for Badulla
- In office 1947–1952
- Preceded by: seat created
- Succeeded by: J. C. T. Kotelawala

Personal details
- Born: 19 October 1912
- Party: Ceylon Indian Congress
- Profession: trade unionist, politician

Sangaralingam Muniandi Pillai Subbaiah (19 October 1912 – ?) was a Ceylonese politician, trade unionist and Tamil activist.

Subbaiah was elected to parliament at the 1st parliamentary election held between 23 August 1947 and 20 September 1947, representing the Ceylon Indian Congress, as the first member for the Badulla electorate. Subbaiah received 27,121 votes (50% of the total vote), which was 10,467 votes more than the Lanka Sama Samaja Party candidate, J. C. T. Kotelawala. The Badulla electoral district was one of five multi-member constituencies, with two members, the others were Ambalangoda-Balapitiya, Balangoda, Colombo Central and Kadugannawa.

Subbaiah was one of seven Ceylon India Congress candidates who were elected to that first parliament.
