= Somasunadaran Skandakumar =

Sri Lankan diplomat and business executive

His Excellency Somasunadaran Skandakumar

High Commissioner to Australia, New Zealand, Fiji and Solomon Islands
- In office 2015–2019

Somasunadaran Skandakumar is a Sri Lankan business executive and diplomat. He was the Group Chairman of the George Steuart Group and Sri Lankan High Commissioner to Australia.

Educated at Royal Primary School and Royal College Colombo, where he was a senior prefect and won the Best Performance Award at the Royal–Thomian in 1966. He graduated from the University of Ceylon Colombo in 1970 with a Bachelor of Science with Double Mathematics and Chemistry, winning the Most Outstanding Sportsman award in 1970. He joined Whittalls Estates as an executive in 1971 then joined George Steuart & Co in 1974 as an executive and then was promoted as a director 1984. In 1997, he became the managing director serving till 2000, when he became Group Chairman, serving till 2008. He had served in the Board of Control for Cricket in Sri Lanka as assistant secretary, secretary and vice president. A club level cricketer, he played for the Tamil Union Cricket and Athletic Club and served as its president from 1998 to 2000. In August 2015 he was appointed High Commissioner of Sri Lanka to Australia with concurrently accredited to Fiji, New Zealand and Solomon Islands.

== See also ==
- List of Sri Lankan non-career diplomats
