= Passara Electoral District =

Electoral district of Sri Lanka

The Passara electoral district was an electoral district of Sri Lanka between March 1960 and February 1989. The district was named after the town of Passara in Badulla District, Uva Province. The 1978 Constitution of Sri Lanka introduced the proportional representation electoral system for electing members of Parliament. The existing 160 mainly single-member electoral districts were replaced with 22 multi-member electoral districts. The Passara electoral district was replaced by the Badulla multi-member electoral district at the 1989 general elections, the first under the proportional representation system, continues to be a polling division of the multi-member electoral district.

== Members of Parliament ==
Key

Independent SLFP UNP

Election	Member	Party	Term
1960 (March)	S. A. Peeris	United National Party	1960
1960 (July)	Amarananda Ratnayake	Sri Lanka Freedom Party	1960-1965
1965	S. A. Peeris	United National Party	1965-1970
1970	S. A. S. Somapala	Sri Lanka Freedom Party	1970-1977
1977	W. M. Karunaratne	United National Party	1977-1989

== Elections ==
=== 1960 (March) Parliamentary General Election ===
Results of the 4th parliamentary election held on 19 March 1960:

Candidate	Party	Symbol	Votes	%
S. A. Peeris	United National Party	Elephant	3,286	38.02
Amarananda Ratnayake	Sri Lanka Freedom Party	Hand	3,216	37.21
Doyle Kularatne		Key	1,253	14.50
C. B. W. Palagolle		Cartwheel	418	4.84
G. Daya Gunasekera		Umbrella	308	3.56
Valid Votes			8,481	98.14
Rejected Votes			161	1.86
Total Polled			8,642	100.00
Registered Electors			11,511	
Turnout				75.08

=== 1960 (July) Parliamentary General Election ===
Results of the 5th parliamentary election held on 20 July 1960:

Candidate	Party	Symbol	Votes	%
Amarananda Ratnayake	Sri Lanka Freedom Party	Elephant	4,700	52.90
S. A. Peeris	United National Party	Hand	4,098	46.13
Valid Votes			8,798	99.03
Rejected Votes			86	0.97
Total Polled			8,884	100.00
Registered Electors			11,511	
Turnout				77.18

=== 1965 Parliamentary General Election ===
Results of the 6th parliamentary election held on 22 March 1965:

Candidate	Party	Symbol	Votes	%
S. A. Peeris	United National Party	Hand	6,022	50.79
Amarananda Ratnayake	Sri Lanka Freedom Party	Elephant	5,694	48.03
Valid Votes			11,716	98.82
Rejected Votes			140	1.18
Total Polled			11,856	100.00
Registered Electors			14,459	
Turnout				82.00

=== 1970 Parliamentary General Election ===
Results of the 7th parliamentary election held on 27 May 1970:

Candidate	Party	Symbol	Votes	%
S. A. S. Somapala	Sri Lanka Freedom Party	Hand	8,382	57.44
Lilian Peeris	United National Party	Elephant	5,798	39.73
Pin Siri Fernando		Bell	176	1.21
Ratnam Kumaravel		Sewing Machine	114	0.78
Valid Votes			14,470	99.16
Rejected Votes			122	0.84
Total Polled			14,592	100.00
Registered Electors			16,461	
Turnout				88.65

=== 1977 Parliamentary General Election ===
Candidate	Party	Symbol	Votes	%
W. M. Karunaratne	United National Party	Elephant	10,451	59.21
S. Seneviratne	Sri Lanka Freedom Party	Hand	5,993	33.95
R. B. Dissanayake		Star	402	2.28
A. Ratnayake		Lamp	362	2.05
P. Wimalasuriya		Omnibus	186	1.05
R. M. Punchibanda		Flower	95	0.54
Valid Votes			17,489	99.08
Rejected Votes			162	0.92
Total Polled			17,651	100.00
Registered Electors			19,925	
Turnout				88.59
