= James Adrianus Martensz =

James Adrianus Martensz JP (28 October 1825 – 12 October 1872) was a proctor and member of the Legislative Council of Ceylon (1865–1872).

James Adrianus Martensz was born on 28 October 1825 in Colombo, Ceylon, the oldest son (second of four children) of Andries Nicolaas Martensz (1787–?) and Johanna Henrietta née Helmers (1796–1861).

In 1846 he was appointed as a proctor (a position similar to a solicitor) of the District Court.

On 11 October 1852 Martensz married Theodora Elizabeth Murray (1828–1878), the daughter of Robert Murray and Elizabeth née Howel, at the Holy Trinity Church, St Sebastian, Colombo. They had two children: Georgiana Theodora (1860–1931); and James Andries (1861–1900), a tea planter, who owned and managed a 18 ha (45 acres) tea plantation in Koslanda, near Haputale in the Badulla District, Uva Province. His grandson James Aubrey Martensz, was a lawyer, member of the 1st Parliament of Ceylon, and the first Sri Lankan High Commissioner to Australia.

On 27 September 1865, following the resignation of Charles Ambrose Lorensz from the Legislative Council of Ceylon in 1864, Martensz was appointed as a Burger Unofficial Member of Legislative Council on the recommendation of Sir Richard Morgan and James de Alwis. The later describing Martnesz as "though no speaker, he was a clever man — one of our best practising Proctors and Conveyancers". Martensz was a leading conveyancer and proctor of that time and had one of the largest practices in the colony. He was described as being "a man of unimpeachable honesty and honour, and there was no call to give him the benefit of any doubt, because of him there was no doubt whatever."

Martnensz died in Colombo on 12 October 1872, at the age of 47. His seat on the Legislative Council was filled by Charles Ferdinands.
