= S. A. Peeris =

Ceylonese businessmen and politician

Hon. S. A. Peeris

Member of the Ceylon Parliament for Badulla
- In office 1952–1960
- Preceded by: J. C. T. Kotelawala
- Succeeded by: multi-member constituency abolished

Member of the Ceylon Parliament for Passara
- In office 1960–1960
- Preceded by: seat created
- Succeeded by: Amarananda Ratnayake
- In office 1965–1970
- Preceded by: Amarananda Ratnayake
- Succeeded by: S. A. S. Somapala

Personal details
- Born: Malwattege Simon Andrew Peeris; 20 September 1904
- Party: United National Party
- Spouse: Lilian née de Silva
- Children: Selina (daughter)
- Education: Buddhist School, Passara; Christian College, Kotte; Ananda College, Colombo
- Profession: businessman

Malwattege Simon Andrew Peeris, OBE (20 September 1904 - ?) was a Ceylonese businessmen and politician.

Peeris was the owner and managing director of the Uva Bus Company, a major transport company in Uva Province, as well as the Gardia Motor Service Company Limited and the Trading and Forwarding Agency Limited. On 11 March 1944 Peeris was elected to the State Council at a by-election for the seat of Bibile, however the unsuccessful candidate, Wijeyananda Dahanayake, petitioned the courts against the election results with the court overturning the result and awarding the seat to Dahanayake.

At the 2nd parliamentary election, held between 24 May 1952 and 30 May 1952, Peeris ran as the United National Party candidate in the Badulla electorate. He secured the position of second member, polling 12,047 votes (30% of the total vote), which was only 403 votes ahead of J. C. T. Kotelawala, who had been elected as the second member at the 1947 elections.

In March 1954 Peeris was appointed as the inaugural president of the Uva Young Men's Buddhist Association.

In 1956 Peeris was awarded an OBE in the 1956 New Year Honours for his parliamentary service representing the Badulla electorate.

He retained his parliamentary seat, as the second member of Badulla, at the 3rd parliamentary election, held between 5 April 1956 and 10 April 1956, receiving 14,724 votes (33% of the total vote) 6,184 votes behind Kotelawala.

On 1 January 1958 the Mahajana Eksath Peramuna coalition government nationalised all private bus companies, including the Uva Bus Company.

At the 4th parliamentary election, held on 19 March 1960, the Badulla electorate was changed to a single-member constituency. As a result, Peeris switched to the newly created Passara electorate, again running as the United National Party candidate. He was successful winning by a narrow margin of only 70 votes over the Sri Lanka Freedom Party candidate, Amarananda Ratnayake. However, as neither of the major political parties managed to obtain a sufficient majority in the election a new election was called. At the July elections for the fifth Parliament which followed four months later, Peeris failed to retain the Passara seat, losing to Ratnayake by 602 votes.

Peeris contested Passara at the 6th parliamentary election, held on 22 March 1965, winning back the seat from Ratnayake, 6,022 votes to 5,694, a margin of 328 votes. He subsequently served as the Parliamentary Secretary to the Minister of Commerce and Trade in the Third Dudley Senanayake cabinet.
