= Vijaya Malalasekera =

Sri Lankan cricketer, cricket administrator, barrister, and businessman (1945–2022)

Personal information
- Full name: Vijaya Prasanna Malalasekera
- Born: 8 August 1945; Colombo, Western Province, Ceylon
- Died: 5 February 2022 (aged 76)
- Batting: Right-handed
- Bowling: Unknown

Domestic team information
- Years: Team
- 1966–1968: Cambridge University

Career statistics
Competition	First-class
Matches	27
Runs scored	699
Batting average	14.26
100s/50s	–/2
Top score	80
Balls bowled	19
Wickets	0
Bowling average	–
5 wickets in innings	–
10 wickets in match	–
Best bowling	–
Catches/stumpings	11/–
- Source: Cricinfo, 26 January 2022

Vijaya Prasanna Malalasekera (8 August 1945 – 5 February 2022) was a Sri Lankan first-class cricketer and cricket administrator, in addition to being a barrister and a businessman.

Malalasekera was born in Colombo on 8 August 1945. His father was Gunapala Piyasena Malalasekera, an academic and a diplomat. He was educated at Royal College in Colombo, where he played for the college cricket team. From there he travelled to England to study law at Fitzwilliam College, Cambridge. While studying at Cambridge, he played first-class cricket for Cambridge University Cricket Club from 1966 to 1968, making 27 appearances. He opened the batting in The University Match of 1967 alongside fellow Sri Lankan Mano Ponniah, with the pair becoming the first Asians to open the batting for Cambridge in the Varsity match. In his 27 first-class appearances, he scored 699 runs at an average of 14.26. He made two half centuries, with a highest score of 80 on his first-class debut against Essex at Fenner's in 1966. His was the highest score in the Cambridge first innings. His 1968 season was curtailed in June, due to a shoulder injury.

After graduating from Cambridge, he was called to the bar to practice as a barrister from the Inner Temple. Upon his return to Sri Lanka he became an advocate and began his private practice. He joined the Ceylon Tobacco Company as a senior management trainee in 1973, remaining with the company until his retirement in 2005. Following internal turmoil in the Board of Control for Cricket, Malalasekera was appointed in March 2001 to head the four-man interim cricket board by Tourism and Sports Minister Lakshman Kiriella. Post-retirement, he held a number of chairmanships at various companies, including Carson Cumberbatch.

Malalasekera died on 5 February 2022, at the age of 76, following a brief illness.
