= High Commission of Sri Lanka, Islamabad =

High Commission of Sri Lanka to Pakistan
- Location: Islamabad, Pakistan
- Address: House No. 62, Atatürk Avenue, Sector G 6/3, Islamabad, Pakistan
- High Commissioner: H.E. Admiral Ravindra Chandrasiri Wijegunaratne, WV, RWP & Bar, RSP, VSV, USP, NI(M), ndc, psn, is a retired Sri Lankan admiral, and former Chief of Defence Staff of the Sri Lanka Armed Forces

The High Commission of Sri Lanka in Islamabad is the diplomatic mission of Sri Lanka to Pakistan. The high commission is also accredited to Kyrgyzstan and Tajikistan. The current high commissioner is Ravindra Chandrasiri Wijegunaratne, the former CDS of Sri Lanka.
