= Malalasekara Hall =

Theatre hall of Nalanda College in Sri Lanka

- මලලසේකර රඟහල
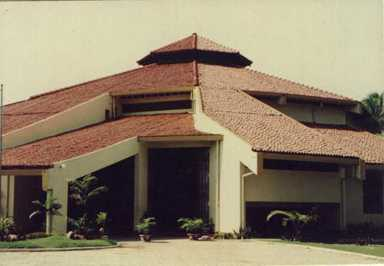
- Interactive map of the Malalasekara Hall area

General information
- Type: Theatre
- Location: Colombo, Sri Lanka, Nalanda College, Colombo
- Coordinates: 6°55′20″N 79°52′29″E
- Inaugurated: 23 June 1990; 35 years ago
- Renovated: 2019
- Owner: Nalanda College
- Operator: Nalanda College

Technical details
- Floor area: 2,000 m^{2} (22,000 sq ft)

Design and construction
- Architect: Royle Senaratne

Other information
- Seating capacity: 550

Malalasekara Hall (Sinhala: මලලසේකර රඟහල) (also called Malalasekara Memorial Hall Nalanda College, Malalasekara Theatre or Malalasekara Theatre Hall), is the performance theatre at Nalanda College, located in Colombo, Sri Lanka. It is named in honour of professor Gunapala Malalasekera, the school's first registered principal (1925-1927) following its establishment.

== History ==
It was during the tenure of Sugunadasa Athukorala, the school principal (1962-1982), that he initiated the plan for building a performance theatre at the school.

The theatre was opened on 23 June 1990 by the Minister of Education, Lalith Athulathmudali. Prominent Sinhalese vocalist, violinist and composer, W. D. Amaradeva, was the guest of honour at the opening. The first performance was Vindana, which comprised three stage dramas, Agni Jala, by Mahesh Kotuwella, Kadatura by Niroshan Illeperuma, and Ekasiya Panaha by Sanka Amarajith.

On 6 April 2006, Malalasekara Hall was gutted by fire due to an electricity shortage and completely destroyed leaving only the building's concrete shell. The Department of Civil Engineering of University of Moratuwa undertook structural investigations (rebound hammer testing and visual inspection) of the fire damaged building. The school's principal, Hemantha Prematilake, initiated a fundraiser to gather donations to re-build the theatre. Former student and architect, Royle Senaratne, volunteered to redesign the theatre. The cost of the renovation/reconstruction was Rs. 24 million and took thirteen years to complete, using labour supplied by the Sri Lankan air force.

It was officially reopened on 28 February 2019 by the Minister of Education, Akila Viraj Kariyawasam. The first concert that was held after the reopening was Geethma, the annual musical performance of the Nalanda College orchestra.

Since then, while catering for Nalanda student needs the theatre hall had become so popular with the general public. It has hosted Khemadasa anniversary concert, Institute of Chemistry Ceylon annual talent show, stage plays like "Aphrodite Mal Kollaya", PickMe International Women's Day celebration ceremonies, saxophone and pan flute performances events and so many other public events.
