= James Aubrey Martensz =

Ceylonese lawyer and politician

Hon. James Aubrey Martensz CBE, JP, UM

Member of the Ceylon Parliament for Burgher Community (appointed member)
- In office November 1947 – January 1949
- Preceded by: seat created

1st Sri Lankan High Commissioner to Australia
- In office January 1949 – August 1955
- Prime Minister: D. S. Senanayake
- Preceded by: position created
- Succeeded by: P. R. Gunasekera

Personal details
- Born: 25 September 1885 Colombo, Sri Lanka
- Died: 26 March 1963 (aged 77) Canberra, Australia
- Education: Royal College, Colombo, Ceylon Law College
- Profession: Proctor

James Aubrey Martensz CBE, JP, UM (25 September 1885 – 26 March 1963) was a Ceylonese lawyer and statesmen. Following a successful legal practice, Martensz was appointed a member of the first Parliament of Ceylon, before stepping down to serve as Ceylon's first High Commissioner in Australia.

== Early life and education ==
James Aubrey Martensz was born 25 September 1885, the oldest son, in a family of twelve, to James Andries Martensz (a planter) and Edith Maud née de Saram. He was the grandson of James Adrianus Martensz, a member of the Legislative Council of Ceylon. He received his education at Royal College, Colombo.

== Legal career ==
He studied law at the Ceylon Law College. Martensz served for a number of years as the private secretary to Justice Wendt and in 1908 was admitted to the bar as a Proctor. He then joined the legal firm of F. J. & G. de Saram, eventually becoming a senior partner in the firm. He was created a Justice of the Peace and Unofficial magistrate.

== Member of parliament ==
Following Ceylon's first parliamentary elections in 1947, Martensz was appointed as a member of the Ceylon House of Representatives. He was one of six members appointed by the Governor-General, to represent important interests which were not represented or inadequately represented in the House. He officiated as Deputy Chairman of Committees between October 1947 and December 1948, and on one occasion as Speaker of the House. He remained a member of parliament until he stepped down in January 1949.

== High Commissioner to Australia ==
In January 1949 he was appointed as Ceylon's first High Commissioner in Australia by his close friend Prime Minister D. S. Senanayake. In 1952, he was awarded the Commander of the Order of the British Empire. He subsequently became Dean of the Diplomatic Corps in 1952.

== Later life ==
Following his tenure as High Commissioner, he returned to Ceylon in August 1955 and was appointed Chairman of the Associated Newspapers of Ceylon. In 1957, he was elected as president of the Dutch Burgher Union of Ceylon, a position in which he served until 1959.

A lifelong bachelor, Martensz emigrated to Australia in 1959 and died in Canberra on 26 March 1963.

== See also ==
- Sri Lankan Non Career Diplomats
