= High Commission of Sri Lanka, London =

High Commission of Sri Lanka in London
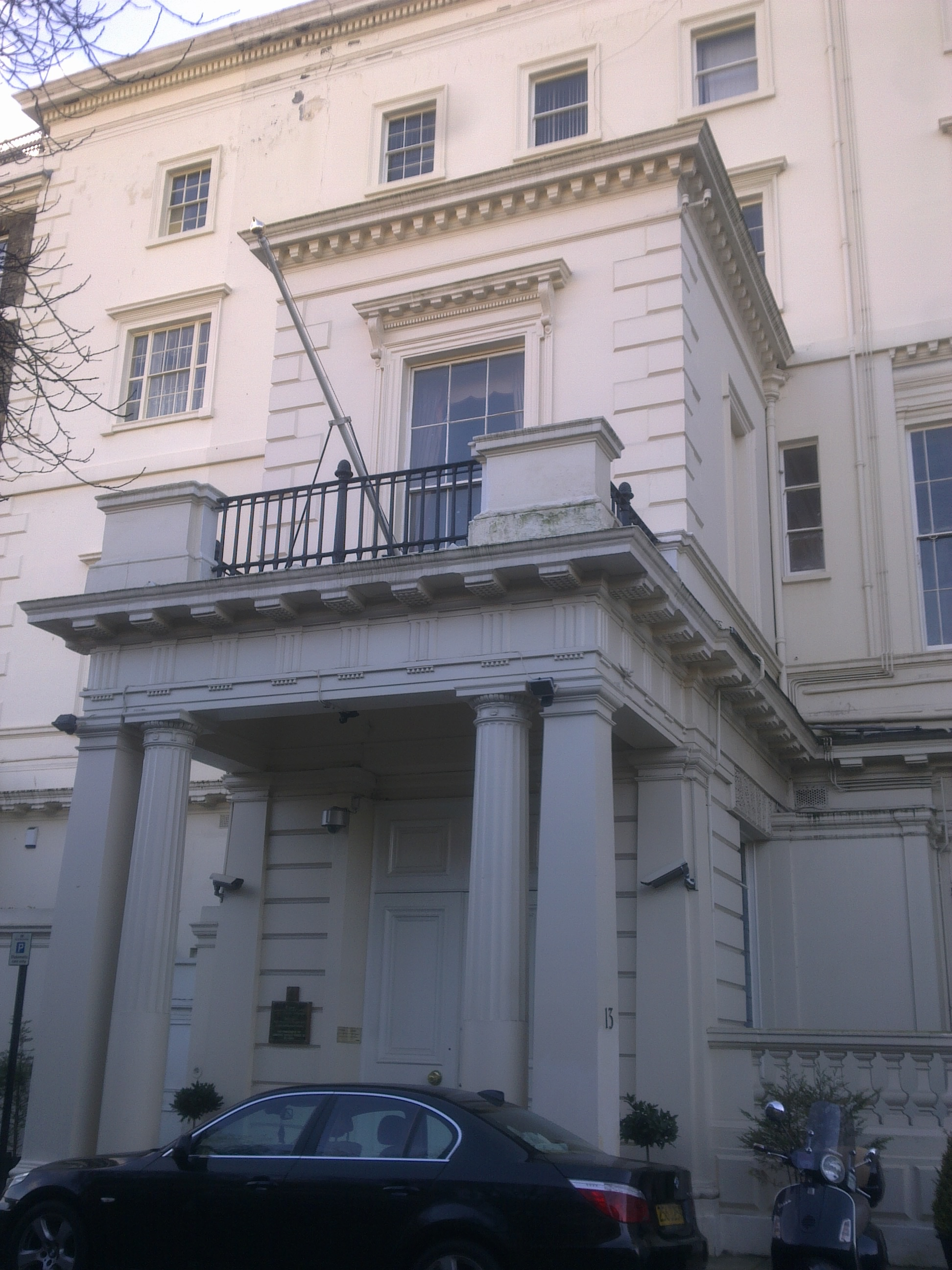
- Location: Westminster, London
- Address: 13 Hyde Park Gardens, London, W2 2LU
- Coordinates: 51°30′46.2″N 0°10′15.1″W
- Opened: 22 October 1948; 76 years ago
- High Commissioner: Nimal Senadheera

The High Commission of Sri Lanka in London is the diplomatic mission of Sri Lanka in the United Kingdom.

The former State Councillor Claude Corea was appointed as the representative of the Government of Ceylon to the United Kingdom on 24 September 1946. With Ceylon gaining self rule on 4 February 1948, the High Commission of the Dominion of Ceylon was opened on 22 October 1948 at 13 Hyde Park Gardens, London. Ceylon appointed Sir Oliver Goonetilleke as the first Ceylonese High Commissioner to the United Kingdom in 1949. It was the second overseas diplomatic mission of Ceylon and the first embassy established by Ceylon after gaining its independence from Britain.

== Gallery ==
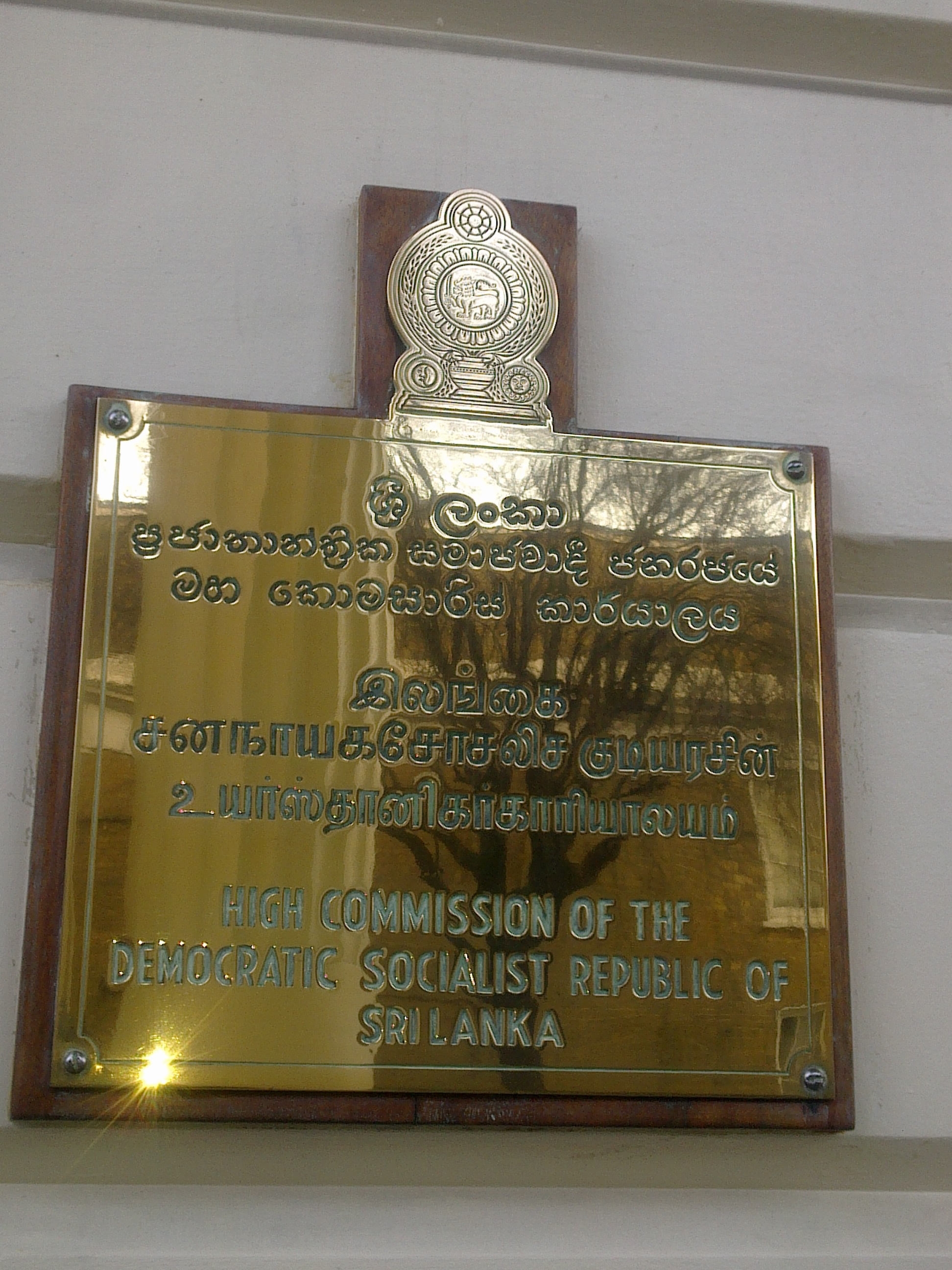
Plaque outside the High Commission in English, Sinhala and Tamil depicting the Emblem of Sri Lanka

== See also ==
- Sri Lankan High Commissioner to the United Kingdom
