= Tilak Goonaratne =

Sri Lankan civil servant and diplomat

Tilak Eranga Goonaratne (27 March 1919 – 4 February 2003) was a Sri Lankan civil servant and diplomat, who served as Sri Lankan High Commissioner to the United Kingdom and the European Economic Community.

Goonaratne graduated with a BA degree from the University of London and qualified as an Advocate of the Supreme Court of Ceylon. Having joined the Ceylon Civil Service in 1943 as a cadet on appointment by the Governor of Ceylon, Goonaratne served several government departments and positions around the island including, Assistant Secretary, Ministry of External Affairs (1947–1951); Government Agent, Trincomalee (1951–1954); Government Agent, Matara (1954–1956); Registrar-General (1956–1958); Director General Broadcasting and Director of Information, Ceylon (1958–1960); Commissioner, Co-operative Development (1960–1963); Director of Economic Affairs (1963); Deputy Secretary to the Treasury (1963–1965). He served as the Council President of the Colombo Plan from 1964 to 1965 and thereafter served as the first Deputy Secretary General for Economic Affairs and Development in the Commonwealth Secretariat from 1965 to 1970. He then served as Sri Lankan High Commissioner to the United Kingdom from 1970 to 1975. As such with Ceylon becoming the Republic of Sri Lanka in 1972, he was the Ceylonese High Commissioner to the United Kingdom and first Sri Lankan High Commissioner to the United Kingdom. He then served as Sri Lankan Ambassador to the European Economic Community from 1975 to 1978 with dual accreditation to Belgium.

He married Pamela J. Rodrigo in 1948. Following her death in 1978, he married Ina Heyn in 1986.

== Publications ==
- S. W. R. D. Bandaranaike, Prime Minister Of Ceylon
- Fifty Years of Co-operative Development in Ceylon Through Consumer Societies (1966)
