= List of high commissioners of Sri Lanka to Australia =

Sri Lankan envoy to Australia

The Sri Lankan High Commissioner to Australia is the Sri Lankan envoy to Australia. Countries belonging to the Commonwealth of Nations typically exchange High Commissioners, rather than Ambassadors. Though there are a few technical differences (for instance, whereas Ambassadors present their diplomatic credentials to the host country's head of state, High Commissioners are accredited to the head of government), they are in practice one and the same office. The Sri Lankan High Commissioner to Australia is concurrently accredited as High Commissioner to New Zealand, Papua New Guinea, and Fiji.

== High Commissioners ==
The Sri Lankan government has not appointed a high commissioner to this posting since 2020. Former high commissioners include:

- James Aubrey Martensz (1949-1955)
- P. R. Gunasekera (1955-1958)
- B. F. Perera (1958-1961)
- Major General Anton Muttukumaru (1963-1966)
- Lieutenant General Denis Perera (1981-1983)
- Neville Jansz
- Edwin Hurulle
- Elmo de J. Seneviratne
- H. K. J. R. Bandara
- Wickrema Weerasooria (1986–1990)
- General Cyril Ranatunga (1993)
- K. Balapatabendi (2004-2008)
- Janaka Perera
- Admiral Thisara Samarasinghe (2011-)
- Felix Dias Abeyesinghe
- Nissanka Wijesundera
- Senaka Walgampaya
- Somasunadaran Skandakumar
- J. C. Weliamuna

== See also ==
- List of heads of missions from Sri Lanka
