= Henry Thambiah =

Sri Lankan judge (1906–1997)

H. W. Tambiah QC

Puisne Justice of the Supreme Court of Ceylon
- In office 1960–1972

Sri Lankan High Commissioner to Canada
- In office September 1975 – December 1977

Personal details
- Born: 28 May 1906 Jaffna, Ceylon
- Died: 1997
- Education: St. John's College, Jaffna; Jaffna Central College; University College, Colombo; Ceylon Law College
- Profession: Lawyer
- Ethnicity: Ceylon Tamil

Henry Wijeyakone Tambiah (1906–1997) was a Ceylonese academic, diplomat, lawyer and judge, born in Sri Lanka during British colonial rule. He was a Commissioner of Assize, High Commissioner and judge of the Supreme Courts of Ceylon and Sierra Leone.

== Early life and family ==
Tambiah was born on 28 May 1906 in Jaffna in northern province of Ceylon. He was the son of David Tambiah, a surveyor, and Thangamma, daughter of Dr William Thillayampalam Paul and sister of Dr S. C. Paul. Both his parents died when he was child. Tambiah was educated at St. John's College, Jaffna and Jaffna Central College from where he passed the London matriculation in the first division. His ambition was to be an engineer. After school he entered University College, Colombo and graduated in 1928 with a BSc (Hons) degree in maths and physics. He taught physics for a year before becoming interest in the legal profession. He joined Ceylon Law College in 1930 and qualified as an attorney-at-law in 1933, winning a prize for coming first in the examinations. He received a LLB (Hons) degree from the University of London in 1934, coming first amongst overseas students.

Tambiah married Leela, daughter of C. D. A. Sherrard from Point Pedro. They have four children – Gulendran, Rajendran Jeyanathan, Rajeswari and Anthony Sudir.

== Career ==
After qualifying Tambiah practised law. Tambiah also worked as a visiting lecturer University of Ceylon and Ceylon Law College and an examiner at the Council of Legal Education between 1938 and 1953. He obtained a PhD from the University of London in 1949 and in 1954 he was called to the Middle Temple. In 1956 he became a QC. He then joined the judicial service in 1956, serving as a Commissioner of Assize for five years before being appointed to the Supreme Court in 1960. He was a Supreme Court judge for twelve years.

== Later life ==
After retiring Tambiah moved to West Africa, serving as a judge on the Supreme Court of Sierra Leone and an appeals court judge in the Gambia. He was awarded a LLD by the University of London in 1973 for his services to Sri Lankan law. He was president of the Royal Asiatic Society of Sri Lanka from 1974 to 1976. Tambiah returned to Sri Lankan in 1975 and started the Tamil section of the Law Faculty at the University of Colombo. He served as the Sri Lankan High Commissioner to Canada from September 1975 to December 1977. He then served as chair of the Law Commission.

Tambiah was awarded the Deshamanya title, the second highest civilian honour in Sri Lanka, in 1993. He died in 1997 aged 91.

== Works ==
Tambiah wrote many books during his life:

- Dominion of Ceylon
- Landlord and Tenant in Ceylon
- Law of Insolvency
- Laws and Customs of the Tamils of Jaffna (1950, Times of Ceylon)
- Laws and Customs of the Tamils of Ceylon (1954)
- Principles of Ceylon Law
- Sinhala Laws and Customs (1968)
- The Judicature of Sri Lanka in its Historical Aspects

== See also ==
- List of Sri Lankan non-career diplomats
