= Embassy of Sri Lanka, Seoul =

Diplomatic mission in South Korea

Embassy of Sri Lanka - South Korea
- Location: Seoul, South Korea
- Address: 347-359, Shindong-Dong, Jung-Gu, Seoul 100 - 450
- Coordinates: 37°33′20.30″N 127°00′44.10″E
- Ambassador: Miss./Mrs. Manisha Gunasekara

The Embassy of Sri Lanka in Seoul is the diplomatic mission of Sri Lanka to South Korea. As of 2015 the ambassador was Tissa Wijeratne, a retired Foreign Service officer. After the retirement of the ambassador Tissa Wijeratne, Manisha Gunasekera assumed duties as Sri Lanka's Ambassador to the Republic of Korea in September 2015.
