= B. H. Bandara =

Ceylonese politician

B. H. Bandara was a Ceylonese politician. He was the member of Parliament of Sri Lanka from Badulla representing the Sri Lanka Freedom Party. He was defeated in the 1977 general election.
