= Saroja Sirisena =

Diplomat from Sri Lanka

Hon. Saroja Sirisena
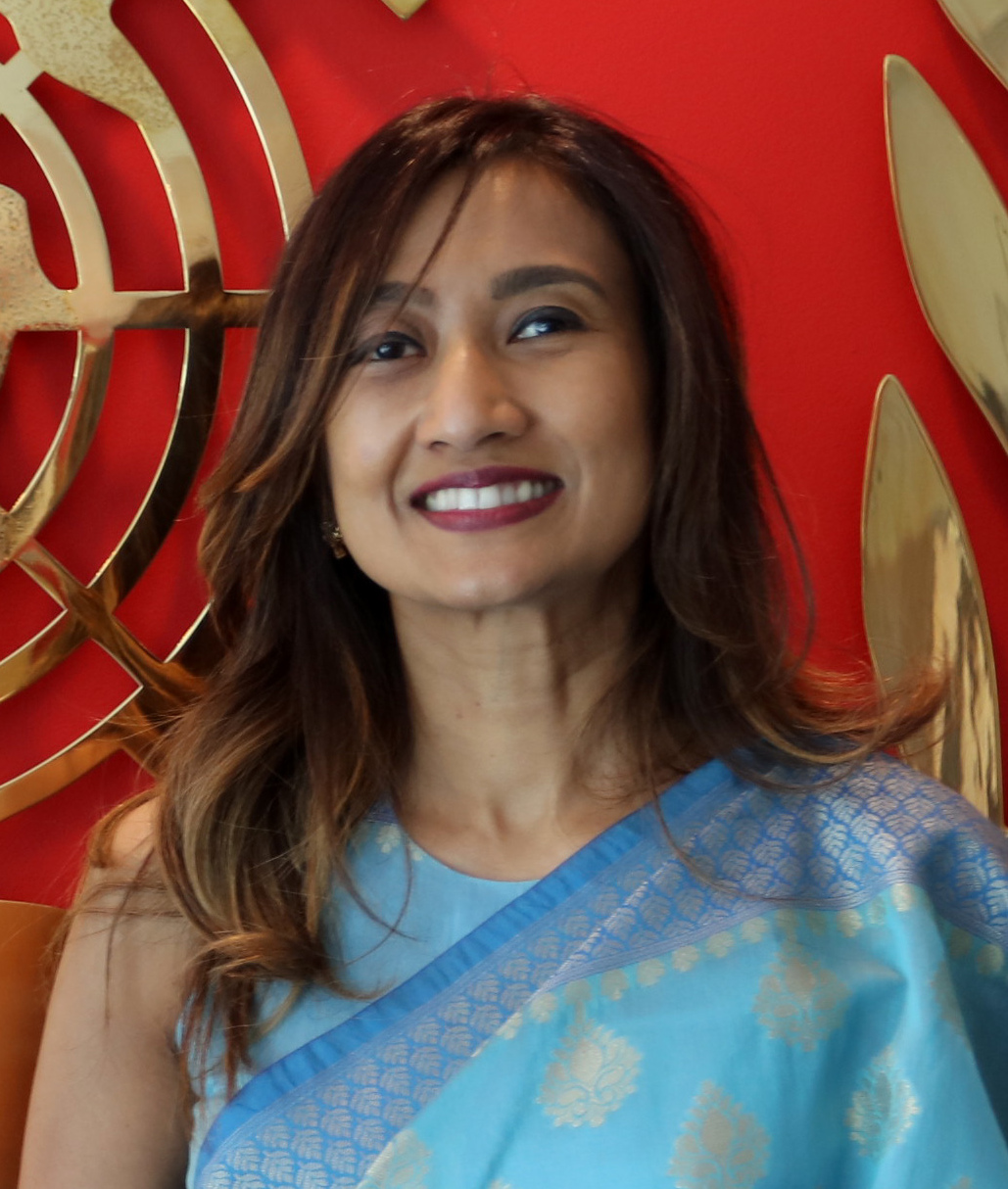
- Sirisena in 2023

Sri Lankan High Commissioner to the United Kingdom
- In office 2 November 2020 – 18 November 2023
- President: Gotabaya Rajapaksa; Ranil Wickremesinghe
- Preceded by: Manisha Gunasekara
- Succeeded by: Rohitha Bogollagama

Personal details
- Born: 29 May 1972 (age 54) Colombo, Sri Lanka
- Spouse: Sudath Talpahewa
- Education: University of Melbourne; École nationale d'administration

Saroja Sirisena is a Sri Lankan diplomat. She served as the Sri Lankan High Commissioner to the United Kingdom between 2020 and 2023. She has previously held diplomatic positions at the United Nations, as well as in Austria and India.

== Early life and education ==
Sirisena was born in Colombo, Sri Lanka. An only child, she was daughter to a family of doctors and grew up in both England and Colombo. She attended Devi Balika Vidyalaya, a school in Colombo, and was active in track and field. After high school, she moved to Australia to study international relations at the University of Melbourne. She graduated from the university with a Bachelor of Arts degree in political science, and later attended Ecole nationale d'Administration in France for her post-graduate studies.

== Career ==
Between 1997 and 1998, Sirisena was the executive assistant to the Minister of Commerce. In 1998, she joined the Sri Lanka Foreign Service, where she served as the Assistant Director of Economic Affairs for the Ministry of Foreign Affairs until 2001.

From 2001 to 2005, she was the First Secretary of the Permanent Delegation to the United Nations Educational, Scientific and Cultural Organization (UNESCO). After this position, she became the Deputy Director of Economic Affairs for the Ministry of Foreign Affairs in 2005.

Sirisena moved to Mumbai when she was appointed Consul General of Sri Lanka in Mumbai in 2014, a position that she held until 2018. As Consul General, she oversaw diplomatic relations with Gujarat, Maharashtra and Goa in India. She has additionally held positions in Sri Lanka as part of diplomatic missions in Geneva, Brussels and Paris.

Sirisena became the Director General of Economic Affairs and the Director General of Public Communications at the Sri Lankan Ministry of Foreign Affairs in 2018. She held these positions until 2019, when she became the Permanent Representative of Sri Lanka to the United Nations in Vienna. In March 2020, she began her position as Sri Lankan High Commissioner to the United Kingdom.

In 2023, she was awarded the Diplomat of the Year from Asia and Oceania at The Diplomat magazine's annual Awards Ceremony.
