= Rodney Vandergert =

Sri Lankan diplomat and civil servant

Rodney Clement Austen Vandergert
- Born: 11 May 1935; Colombo, Ceylon
- Died: 4 May 2009 (aged 73); Sri Lanka
- Education: Royal College Colombo, University of Ceylon, New York University
- Occupation: Diplomat
- Known for: Permanent Secretary to the Ministry of Foreign Affairs, Sri Lankan Ambassador to People's Republic of China, Sri Lankan Ambassador to Italy, Sri Lankan Ambassador to Yugoslavia

Rodney Clement Austen Vandergert (11 May 1935 – 4 May 2009) was a prominent Sri Lankan diplomat and civil servant, who served as the Permanent Secretary to the Ministry of Foreign Affairs of Sri Lanka and Chairman of the Public Service Commission. He had served as Sri Lankan High Commissioner to Canada and Ambassador to People’s Republic of China & Soviet Union.

== Education ==
Vandergert was educated at the Royal College Colombo where he won the Governor-General's prize. He then pursued higher studies at the University of Ceylon graduating with LLB and qualified as an Advocate of the Supreme Court at the Colombo Law College. Later would gain a master's degree in Law from the New York University, specializing in International Public Law.

== Diplomatic career ==
In 1960 he was selected to the Ceylon Overseas Service. After joining the Foreign Service he served in several foreign countries that included United States, Pakistan. Within the foreign ministry he served in several capacities including that of Legal Advisor to the Ministry of Foreign Affairs, Director United Nations & Multi Lateral Affairs Division and Director-General Political Affairs. He served as Sri Lanka's High Commissioner in Canada, Ambassador in Moscow (Soviet Union) with concurrent accreditation in Prague, Warsaw, East Berlin and Ambassador in Beijing (People's Republic of China). Thereafter he was appointed to the post of Permanent Secretary of the Ministry of Foreign Affairs (known as Foreign Secretary) as the country's most senior diplomat in 1994. At the time he was the second career diplomat to be appointed to this post till then.

After retiring from the foreign service, he served as Chairman of the Public Service Commission from 2002 to 2005 and was a visiting lecturer in International Law at the Law Faculty. He was honorary member of the Dutch Burgher Union of Ceylon. He died in May 2009.

== References and external links ==
- Mr. Rodney Vandergert
- Rodney Clement Austen Vandergert
- Appreciation Rodney Vandergert - a gentleman who was held in high regard

Diplomatic posts
Preceded by Wilhelm Woutersz	Sri Lankan Ambassador to China; November 12, 1997 – 2000	Succeeded by Karunatilaka Amunugama
Preceded by October 19, 1983: Neville Kanakeratne	Sri Lankan Ambassador to the Soviet Union; August 7, 1988–March 14, 1991	Succeeded by Nissanka Wijeyeratne
Preceded by Vernon Mendis	Sri Lankan High Commissioner to Canada; 1980 –1981	Succeeded by Ernest Corea
