= Dayan Jayatilleka =

Sri Lankan politician

- දයාන් ජයතිලක

Permanent Representative of Sri Lanka to the United Nations in Geneva
- In office June 2007 – October 2009
- Preceded by: Sarala Fernando
- Succeeded by: Kshenuka Seneviratne

Sri Lankan Ambassador to France
- In office January 2011 – January 2013
- Preceded by: Lionel Fernando
- Succeeded by: Karunaratne Hangawatte

Personal details
- Born: 1956 (age 69–70)
- Education: University of Peradeniya; University of Colombo; Griffith University
- Profession: Academic
- Ethnicity: Sinhalese

Dayan Jayatilleka (Sinhala: දයාන් ජයතිලක; born 1956) is a leftist Sri Lankan academic, diplomat, writer and politician.

== Early life and family ==
Jayatilleka was born in 1956. He is the son of Mervyn de Silva and Lakshmi Sylvia Fernando. He was named after the Israeli general Moshe Dayan. Jayatilleka was educated at St. Joseph's College, Colombo. After school he studied at Aquinas University College, Colombo before joining the University of Sri Lanka Peradeniya campus, graduating from its successor, the University of Peradeniya, with a first class honours B.A. degree in political science. He was Fulbright Scholar at the Binghamton University between 1982 and 1983, studying for a doctorate in political sociology.

Jayatilleka had become involved in radical politics at a young age and whilst studying Advanced Level at Aquinas he was "picked up" by the Intelligence Services Division and questioned at their headquarters in Longdon Place, Colombo. At Peradeniya he was a member of two radical groups - the Lanka Samaja Adhyayana Kavaya (Lanka Social Studies Circle) and Samaja Adhyayana Kavaya. Whilst at Binghamton he was involved with solidarity movements in support of El Salvador, Guatemala and Nicaragua. He returned to Sri Lanka in 1982 to observe the presidential election but, having gotten involved in militant Sri Lankan politics, never returned to Binghamton and dropped out.

Jayatilleka has been married three times. He first married a Burgher woman called Margreet and then Pulsara Liyanage. He is currently married to accountant Sanja de Silva.

== Career ==
Jayatilleka was a visiting lecturer at the University of Colombo from 1982 to 1984. After getting involved in radical politics he and others founded the Vikalpa Kandayama (Alternative Group). Jayatilleka had been a supporter of Tamil militancy for some time and had argued that their actions were a war of national liberation, not terrorism. Vikalpa Kandayama formed a relationship with the Tamil militant Eelam People's Revolutionary Liberation Front (EPRLF). Vikalpa Kandayama was banned in 1986 and Jayatilleka was indicted, in absentia, by the Colombo High Court on 14 counts including conspiracy to overthrow the state through violence. In the meantime, Jayatilleka had gone into hiding, spending two years underground in Sri Lanka and one year in India. He was then pardoned by President J. R. Jayewardene.

Jayatilleka joined the Sri Lanka People's Party after its leader Vijaya Kumaratunga was assassinated and became a member of the party's central committee. Jayatilleka was Minister of Planning and Youth Affairs for the North Eastern Province between 1988 and 1989 but resigned because of policy differences. Jayatilleka then abandoned his radical beliefs and became a prominent supporter of President Ranasinghe Premadasa, serving as his advisor from 1989 to 1993. He was Director of Conflict Studies at the Institute of Policy Studies (1990–94) and executive director of the Premadasa Centre (1994-2000). He was also editor of Lanka Guardian, the journal founded by his father, from 1996 to 1998.

Jayatilleka received a M.Phil. degree from the University of Colombo in October 2002. He was visiting senior fellow and adjunct professor at the Johns Hopkins University between 2005 and 2006. He was later appointed senior lecturer at the University of Colombo. He was a member of the Council of Management of the Bandaranaike Centre for International Studies (BCIS). He received a PhD degree from the Griffith University in 2007 after writing a thesis titled The Moral Sierra Maestra: The Moral-Ethical Dimension of the Political Thought of Fidel Castro.

Jayatilleka was Sri Lanka's Permanent Representative to the United Nations in Geneva between June 2007 and October 2009. During his tenure he was chairman of the International Labour Organization's governing body (2007–08); vice president of the United Nations Human Rights Council (UNHRC) (2007–08); and co-ordinator of the Asian group on United Nations Conference on Trade and Development (2009). Jayatilleka is credited with shielding Sri Lanka from censure by the UNHRC for alleged human rights violations during the final stages of the Sri Lankan Civil War in 2009. Jayatilleka had been appointed for a two-year term but when his contract expired in June 2009 President Mahinda Rajapaksa extended his contract until June 2010. However, on 17 July 2009 the Foreign Ministry told him by fax to "relinquish [his] duties and return to Colombo on 20 August". According to Jayatilleka no reason was given for his sacking but it was suggested that Sinhalese nationalists were unhappy with support for the implementation of the 13th Amendment.

Jayatilleka was visiting senior research fellow at the National University of Singapore's Institute of South Asian Studies (ISAS) in 2010. He was honorary senior fellow at ISAS between 2011 and 2013. He was Ambassador to France, also accredited to Portugal and Spain, and Sri Lanka’s permanent delegate to UNESCO from January 2011 to January 2013.

Jayatilleka has written articles and columns for several publications including the Daily Mirror, Daily News, The Island, Lakbima, Sunday Island, Sunday Observer and Weekend Express.

== Views ==
=== Alleged racism and fear mongering ===
Despite his past support of the LTTE after Dayan began to support Mahinda Rajapaksa he is accused of becoming racist against Tamils and having double standards when Tamils are concerned as well not differentiating the LTTE from the Tamil people and democratically elected Tamil politicians. In his articles Dayan attacked the Wickremesinghe-Sirisena government for "serving the minorities" and claimed that the planned new constitution will federalize and divide Sri Lanka which will cause the "Sinhala national consciousness" to be atomized and disintegrate and empower the "Tamil consciousness". Further he claimed that the agenda of the "Tamil bourgeoisie" and "Diaspora capitalists" is to use the constitution is to "rewire and reprogram" the Sinhala consciousness so they can never win another war, divide and rule the "majority" and weaken the national state. His statements have been harshly criticized by critics as fear mongering to the benefit of Mahinda Rajapaksa and his camp.

=== Views on Gotabaya Rajapaksa ===
Dayan was known for his opposition to Gotabaya Rajapaksa and has implied of him being the creator of Bodu Bala Sena with the help of Israel but Dayan denies that he was talking about Gotabaya but as the creator of the BBS but was involved in Zionist influence in Sri Lanka. Dayan believes that Gotabaya is following a form of Sinhala-Buddhist ultra-nationalism which he has named ‘Gotabayanism’ which according to him is "part uber-Trumpian, part ‘Eastworld’, all uber-hawk".

== Works ==
- Sri Lanka: The Travails of a Democracy: Unfinished War, Protracted Crisis (Vikas Publications, 1995)
- Fidel’s Ethics of Violence: The Moral Dimension of the Political Thought of Fidel Castro (Pluto Press and University of Michigan Press, 2007)
- Long War, Cold Peace: Conflict and Crisis in Sri Lanka (Vijitha Yapa, 2013)

== See also ==
- List of Sri Lankan non-career diplomats
