= List of ambassadors of Sri Lanka to France =

The Sri Lankan Ambassador to France is the Sri Lankan envoy to France. The Sri Lankan Ambassador to France is concurrently accredited as Ambassador to Portugal, Andorra, Monaco and Spain. The Ambassador to France is also the Permanent delegate of Sri Lankan to UNESCO. Ambassador Sugeeshwara Gunaratna of the Sri Lanka Foreign Service, holds the post since 1st July 2026.

== Ambassadors ==
Date of submission of the letters of credence		Ambassador	Since - To
1953		Vernon Mendis - Chargé d’affaires a.i	1953 - 1955
6 November, 1965		Sri Lalitha Rajapakse (en)	1965 - 1967
1968		Fredrick de Silva (en)	1968 - 1970
7 September, 1970	JORF 1	Tissa Wijeyeratne (en)	7 September 1970
21 November, 1974	JORF 2	Ediriweera Sarachchandra (en)	1974 -1977
16 March, 1978	JORF 3	Vernon Mendis (en)	1978 - ...
30 July, 1981	JORF 4	N. Balasubramaniam	1981 - ...
21 September, 1984	JORF 5	D.G.B. da Silva	1984 - ....
1985		Ananda W. P. Guruge (en)	1985 - ...
12 January, 1989	JORF 6	Warnasena Rasaputra (en)	1989 - ...
1 February, 1993	JORF 7	Sirisena Banda Hettiaratchi	1993 - ...
7 June, 1995	JORF 8	Sumitra Peries	1995 -1999
16 March, 1999	JORF 9	Senake Bandaranayake (en)	16 March 1999 - October 2000
26 October, 2000	JORF 10	Christopher Daneshan Casie Chetty	26 October 2000 - November 2001
15 November, 2001	JORF 11	Chandra Gemunu Wickremasinghe	15 November 2001 - 1 April 2003
1 April, 2003	JORF 12	Ananda Goonasekera	1 April 2003 - 25 July 2005
25 July, 2005	JORF 13	Chitranganee Wagiswara	25 July 2005 - 26 January 2009
26 January, 2009	JORF 14	Lionel Fernando (en)	November 2008 - November 2010
28 January, 2011	JORF 15	Dayan Jayatilleka (en)	January 2011 - January 2013
11 July, 2013	JORF 16	Karunaratne Hangawatte	2013 - 2015
8 September, 2015	JORF 17	Tilak Ranaviraja	2015 - 2017
18 December, 2017	JORF 18	Buddhi K. Athauda	October 2017- 2020
12 April, 2021	JORF 19	Kshanika Hirimburegama (en)	2020 - 2023
22 September, 2023	JORF 20	Manisha Gunasekera (d)	February 2023- February 2026
2026		Sugeeshwara Gunaratna	July 2026 - current

== See also ==
- List of heads of missions from Sri Lanka
