= V. Coomaraswamy =

Ceylonese civil servant and diplomat

Sir Velupillai Coomaraswamy CMG

Ceylonese High Commissioner to Canada

Personal details
- Born: 25 September 1892
- Died: 13 November 1972 (aged 80)
- Profession: Civil servant
- Ethnicity: Ceylon Tamil

Sir Velupillai Coomaraswamy, CMG (25 September 1892 – 13 November 1972) was a Ceylonese civil servant and diplomat. He served as the Ceylonese High Commissioner to Canada and Ceylonese Envoy to Burma.

== Early life and family ==
Coomaraswamy was born on 25 September 1892. He was the son of Velupillai from Vaddukoddai in northern Ceylon. Coomaraswamy passed the London Interscience Examination after school.

Coomaraswamy married Thayalnayaki, daughter of M. Sinnathamby. After Thayalnayaki's death he married Nesamani, daughter of W.H.T. Bartlett.

== Civil service career ==
Coomaraswamy worked as teacher before joining the Ceylon Civil Service in 1913. As a cadet, he served in the Puttalam Kachcheri and the Anduradhapura Kachcheri. He was Police Magistrate and District Judge in Puttalam, Negombo, Kegalle and Panadura, thereafter served as the District Judge, Kegalle. He was then Assistant Government Agent in Kegalle, Puttalam and Hambantota. He was assigned to the State Council of Ceylon, serving as Clerk of the State Council and Secretary to the Board of Ministers from 1932 to 1933. In 1933, he was posted as Acting Government Agent, Eastern Province. He was then appointed Additional Registrar General, Registrar General, acting Commissioner of Lands, acting conservator of Forests, Food Controller, Controller of Import, Exports and Exchange, Government Agent, Eastern Province in 1945. In late 1945, he served as of representative of the Government of Ceylon in Malaya. He was the Government Agent for the Western Province from January 1946 to December 1947. He was appointed Permanent Secretary to the Ministry of Home Affairs and Rural Development. He was the first native Government Agent of the Western province.

== Diplomatic career ==
Coomaraswamy served as the Deputy Ceylonese High Commissioner in London in 1948. In 1953, he was appointed Ceylonese Minister and Envoy Extraordinary in Rangoon and thereafter he was appointed Ceylonese High Commissioner in Ottawa in 1958. Coomaraswamy died on 13 November 1972.

== Honours ==
Coomaraswamy was made a Companion of the Order of St Michael and St George (CMG) in the 1947 Birthday Honours. He was knighted in the 1952 New Year Honours as a Knights Bachelor.

== See also ==
- Sri Lankan Non Career Diplomats
