= M. V. P. Peiris =

Ceylonese orthopaedic surgeon and politician

Hon. Dr. M. V. P. Peiris OBE

Minister of Health and Social Sciences
- In office 23 March 1960 – 21 July 1960
- Prime Minister: Dudley Senanayake
- Preceded by: A. P. Jayasuriya
- Succeeded by: A. P. Jayasuriya

Minister of Commerce and Trade
- In office 27 March 1965 – 1968
- Prime Minister: Dudley Senanayake
- Succeeded by: Hugh Fernando

Senator of Ceylon
- In office 1955–1968

Personal details
- Born: Mahapitiyage Velin Peter Peiris; 28 July 1898 Panadura, Ceylon
- Died: 26 April 1988 (aged 89) Colombo, Sri Lanka
- Party: United National Party
- Spouse: Edith née Carey
- Occupation: Orthopaedic surgeon, Politician
- Profession: Medicine

Mahapitiyage Velin Peter Peiris, OBE, LRCP, FRCS, (28 July 1898 – 26 April 1988) was a Ceylonese orthopaedic surgeon and politician.

Peiris received his education at St. John's College Panadura and St Joseph's College, Colombo, before entering Ceylon Medical College qualifying in 1926. After graduation and junior hospital posts he was appointed as a lecturer in anatomy and later lecturer in surgery at Ceylon Medical College, passing the Fellowship of the Royal Colleges of Surgeons in 1929. From 1930 to 1945 he served as a member of the Ceylon Medical Corps, acting as surgeon to the Military Hospital in Ceylon.

He served on the staff of the General Hospital, Colombo, from 1936 to 1960 and in 1951 he was elected the President of the Ceylon Medical Association.

Peiris was appointed an Officer of the Order of the British Empire in the 1952 Birthday Honours list.

Peiris was appointed to the Senate of Ceylon in 1955, as the representative of the Medical Association.

In March 1960 Peiris was appointed as by Prime Minister Dudley Senanayake as the Minister of Health and Social Sciences, as part of the Second Dudley Senanayake cabinet.

In March 1965 he was appointed as Minister of Commerce and Trade in the Third Dudley Senanayake cabinet In the 1968 cabinet re-shuffle Hugh Fernando was appointed the Minister of Commerce and Trade and Peiris was offered and accepted the position of Ceylon's Ambassador to the Soviet Union from 1968 and 1969. He was thereafter appointed the High Commissioner to United Kingdom from October 1969 to December 1970.

== See also ==
- Sri Lankan Non Career Diplomats
