= Gunasena de Soyza =

Sri Lankan civil servant

- Born: December 20, 1902; Colombo, Sri Lanka
- Died: October 12, 1961 (aged 58); London, United Kingdom
- Education: Ananda College, Colombo, University College, Colombo, Jesus College, Oxford
- Occupations: Civil Servant, Ceylon High Commissioner
- Awards: CMG, OBE

Gunasena de Soyza, CMG, OBE (20 December 1902 – 12 October 1961) was a Sri Lankan civil servant. He served as the Permanent Secretary to the Ministry of External Affairs and Defence before appointment as Ceylon's High Commissioner to the United Kingdom.

== Early life and education ==
Gunasena De Soyza was born on 20 December 1902 in Colombo, Sri Lanka. He attended Ananda College, Colombo one of the leading Buddhist schools in Sri Lanka for his primary and secondary education and later gained admission to the Ceylon University College, graduating in 1923 with a Bachelor of Arts a degree from the University of London, and studied classics at Jesus College, Oxford.

== Civil service career ==
He was appointed to the Ceylon Civil Service in 1926 by the Secretary of State. On his returned to Ceylon he was attached to the Matara Kachcheri as a cadet. He thereafter served as an Office Assistant to the Government Agent in Hambanthota, Jaffna and Kegalle. We thereafter served as Landing Surveyor, Customs. He thereafter served as Assistant Government Agent in Badulla and Mullattivu before he returned to Colombo as Deputy Registrar of Co-operative Society. In 1944, he was appointed Commissioner of Cooperative Department. In 1948, he was appointed Permanent Secretary to the Ministry of Food and Co-operative Undertakings and served till 1949. He thereafter served as the acting Ministry of Industries, Ministry of Posts, before taking over as Permanent Secretary, Ministry of Health and Local Government. In 1953, he was seconded to Secretary, Cabinet Planning Committee and Chief Planning Commission. In October 1953, he was appointed Permanent Secretary to the Ministry of External Affairs and Defence. He was appointed Ceylon's High Commissioner to the United Kingdom in December 1957 and served till October 1958. He was reappointed in February 1960 and was serving until his death on 12 October 1961. He was appointed an Officer of the Order of the British Empire in the 1948 Birthday Honours in recognition of his work for the cooperative movement, and he was appointed a Companion of the Order of St Michael and St George in the 1954 Birthday Honours.

== See also ==
- List of Salagamas
- Sri Lankan Non Career Diplomats
