= Bingiriya Electoral District =

Electoral district of Sri Lanka

Bingiriya electoral district was an electoral district of Sri Lanka between August 1947 and February 1989. The district was named after the town of Bingiriya in Kurunegala District, North Western Province. The 1978 Constitution of Sri Lanka introduced the proportional representation electoral system for electing members of Parliament. The existing 160 mainly single-member electoral districts were replaced with 22 multi-member electoral districts. Bingiriya electoral district was replaced by the Kurunegala multi-member electoral district at the 1989 general elections, the first under the proportional representation system.

== Members of Parliament ==
Key

Independent SLFP UNP

Election	Member	Party	Term
1947	T. B. Subasinghe	LSSP	
1952			
1956			
1960 (March)			
1960 (July)			
1965			
1970			
1977			

== Elections ==
=== 1947 Parliamentary General Election ===
Candidate	Party	Symbol	Votes	%
T. B. Subasinghe	Lanka Sama Samaja Party	Chair	10,410	
G. E. Arthanayake		Umbrella	814	
L. W. Weerasinghe		Lamp	684	
S. M. Gunarath Banda		Key	617	
A. R. Wijekoon		Hand	105	
Valid Votes				100.00%
Rejected Votes			316	
Total Polled			12,946	
Registered Electors			36,156	
Turnout				

=== 1952 Parliamentary General Election ===
Candidate	Party	Symbol	Votes	%
Valid Votes				100.00%
Rejected Votes				
Total Polled				
Registered Electors				
Turnout				

=== 1956 Parliamentary General Election ===
Candidate	Party	Symbol	Votes	%
Valid Votes				100.00%
Rejected Votes				
Total Polled				
Registered Electors				
Turnout				

=== 1960 (March) Parliamentary General Election ===
Candidate	Party	Symbol	Votes	%
Valid Votes				100.00%
Rejected Votes				
Total Polled				
Registered Electors				
Turnout				

=== 1960 (July) Parliamentary General Election ===
Candidate	Party	Symbol	Votes	%
Valid Votes				100.00%
Rejected Votes				
Total Polled				
Registered Electors				
Turnout				

=== 1965 Parliamentary General Election ===
Candidate	Party	Symbol	Votes	%
Valid Votes				100.00%
Rejected Votes				
Total Polled				
Registered Electors				
Turnout				

=== 1970 Parliamentary General Election ===
Candidate	Party	Symbol	Votes	%
Valid Votes				100.00%
Rejected Votes				
Total Polled				
Registered Electors				
Turnout				

=== 1977 Parliamentary General Election ===
Candidate	Party	Symbol	Votes	%
Valid Votes				100.00%
Rejected Votes				
Total Polled				
Registered Electors				
Turnout				
