= B. F. Perera =

Benjamin Franklin Perera, CMG, OBE, CCS (1901-19??) was a Ceylonese civil servant and diplomat. He was the Permanent Secretary, Ministry of Home Affairs. He was Ceylon's Ambassador to the Soviet Union (1968-1969), Ceylon's Ambassador to West Germany (1961-1965), Ceylon's High Commissioner to Australia and New Zealand (1958-1961) and Deputy High Commissioner to the United Kingdom (1956-1958).

Graduating from the University of London with the Bachelor of Arts degree, Perera was appointed to the Ceylon Civil Service by the Secretary of State in December 1924. He served in the kachcheris of Colombo and Anuradhapura as a cadet; as an acting police magistrate and office assistant to the Assistant Government Agent of Puttalam. Promoted to Cass 4 officer, he served as a police magistrate, office assistant and additional assistant government agent. Promoted to Class 2, he served as assistant government agent, Galle; additional secretary, Minister of Home Affairs; assistant government agent, Gamapaha; assistant government agent, Kegalle; acting government agent, North Western Province and acting director of rural development. Promoted to Class 1, he was appointed acting government agent, Western Province. In February 1951, he was appointed Permanent Secretary, Ministry of Health and Local Government and in January 1952, he was appointed Permanent Secretary, Home Affairs.

His father was K. S. Perera and in 1930 he married Phoebe Elaine de Fonseka, daughter of Dr. C. P. de Fonseka and sister of Sir Susantha de Fonseka. He was appointed an Officer of the Order of the British Empire (OBE) in the 1949 New Year Honours and a Companion of the Order of St Michael and St George (CMG) in the 1955 New Year Honours.
