= Gunapala Malalasekera =

Sri Lankan scholar and diplomat (1899–1973)

Gunapala Piyasena Malalasekera
- Born: George Pieris Malalasekera; 9 November 1899; Malamulla, Panadura, British Ceylon
- Died: 23 April 1973 (aged 73); Colombo, Sri Lanka
- Education: St. John's College Panadura
- Alma mater: University of London (BA, MA, PhD, DLitt)
- Occupations: Academic, diplomat
- Spouse(s): Margaret Russell (m. 1927–d. 1930); Lyle Malalasekera
- Children: 6
- Parents: Veda Muhandiram Malalage Siyadoris Peiris Malalasekera Seneviratna (father); Dona Selestina Jayawardene Kuruppu (mother)

Gunapala Piyasena Malalasekera, OBE, JP, KCM (9 November 1899 – 23 April 1973) was a Sri Lankan academic, scholar and diplomat best known for his Malalasekara English-Sinhala Dictionary. He was Ceylon's first Ambassador to the Soviet Union, Ceylon's High Commissioner to Canada, the United Kingdom and Ceylon's Permanent Representative to the United Nations in New York. He was the Professor Emeritus in Pali and Dean of the Faculty of Oriental Studies.

== Early life and education ==
Born on 9 November 1899 at Malamulla, Panadura as George Pieris Malalasekera. His father was a well-known Ayurvedic (native medicine) physician, Ayur. Dr. M. S. Pieris Malalasekera.

Malalasekera was educated at St. John's College Panadura, (now the St. John's College National School). It was a leading school in the English medium in Panadura under the head master Cyril Jansz, a reputed educationist of the colonial era. After receiving his education in that school from 1907 to 1917, he joined the Ceylon Medical College, Colombo to qualify as a doctor with a Licentiate in Medicine and Surgery (LMS). However, the death of his father cut short his medical studies, compelling him to give up his hopes of becoming a medical doctor. By following a correspondence course from England, he gained a BA from the University of London External System in 1919 with a first division. His subjects were English, Latin, Greek and French. He was the youngest candidate to obtain the Bachelor of Arts degree in the British Empire in that year with a first class.

In 1923, he proceeded to join the University of London and obtained the two postgraduate degrees of a MA and a PhD concurrently in 1925, in oriental languages majoring in Pali from the London School of Oriental Studies. Malalasekera would later gain a DLitt in 1938, his thesis was 'Pali Literature in Sri Lanka' from the University of London.

== Teaching career ==
Coming under the influence of Buddhist renaissance of Srimath Anagarika Dharmapala, he changed his foreign names of George and Pieris to those of Gunapala Piyasena and henceforth came to be known as G. P. (Gunapala Piyasena) Malalasekera. After gaining his BA he took to teaching at Ananda College, Colombo as an assistant teacher, then under the principal P. de S. Kularatne. Both of them were the architects of the Sinhalese national costume. In quick succession Malalasekera rose up the ranks to be the Vice Principal and acting Principal of Ananda College. Thereafter he left for London for his graduate studies. On his return to the motherland in 1926, he was appointed the first registered Principal of newly formed Nalanda College Colombo. The student assembly hall of Nalanda College Colombo is named Malalasekara Theater in memory of him.

== Academic career ==
In 1927, he succeeded Ven. Suriyagoda as lecturer in the then University College, Colombo to lecture in English on Sinhala, Pali and Sanskrit for the University of London degree examinations. When the University of Ceylon was founded in 1942, he became the Professor of Pali and Buddhist Studies. Serving as the Head of the Department of Pali, he went on to serve as the Dean of the Faculty of Oriental Studies, University of Ceylon. His research on Buddhism and Buddhist Civilization was extensive and he was the Editor-in-Chief of the Encyclopaedia of Buddhism. He contributed research papers and publications to the Pali Text Society of London under the patronage of scholars like Rhys David and Miss I. B. Horner. From 1927, he was twice elected the Joint Secretary of the All Ceylon Buddhist Congress. Thrice he was the Vice-President and functioned as its President from 1939 to 1957. On his departure from the University of Ceylon, he was appointed Professor Emeritus.

During his tenure in office, he saw to it that the All-Ceylon Buddhist Congress constructed a new building for its headquarters in Buller's Road (now Bauddhaloka Mawatha). He took a delight in the activities of the Viharamahadevi Girls' Home, Biyagama and was responsible for the establishment of boys' homes at Panadura and Ja-Ela. During his presidency of the Buddhist Congress for 25 years, he addressed 20 of its annual sessions. His most significant publication is the Malalasekara Sinhala-English Dictionary. It was first published in 1948 and is currently up to its fifth edition, which was released in 2014. Of equal importance is the Dictionary of Pali Proper names. He was an ardent member of the Royal Asiatic Society of Ceylon. He represented Ceylon at several parleys abroad, notably: Conference on Living Religions (London, 1924), Conference on World Religious (London, 1936), Association of Occidental (Western) and Oriental Philosophers (Hawaii, 1949), Association of Indian Philosophers – India, meeting of the Pakistani Philosophers (Karachi, 1953), and the Seminar on Religions for Peace, (San Francisco, USA, 1965). He presented numerous essays, write-ups and literary contributions, and delivered radio talks on Buddhist and religious/cultural matters and Social service assignments. He was the founder president of the World Fellowship of Buddhists inaugurated within the Temple of the Tooth, Kandy in 1950 at the suggestion of the All Ceylon Buddhist Congress.

He was president of the World Fellowship of Buddhists from 1950 to 1958 as well as the Ceylon Arts Society;

== Diplomatic career ==
Malalasekera was appointed the Ceylon's first Ambassador to the USSR in 1957 by Prime Minister S. W. R. D. Bandaranaike when he established diplomatic relations with socialist countries such as Russia, China, Czechoslovakia, Yugoslavia. In 1959, he was appointed concurrently first Ambassador for Ceylon to Czechoslovakia, Poland and Romania. He served until 1961

Subsequently, he functioned as Ceylon's High Commissioner to Canada and Ceylon's Permanent Representative to the UN in New York from 1961 to 1963. There he served as chairman, Security Council Member, Fact Finding Mission to Saigon and also in the Committee on Information from North Non-self Governing Territories. Finally, he was the Ceylon's High Commissioner to the UK from 1963 to 1967.

== Later life ==
In 1967, he returned to the island to accept the post of chairman of the National Higher Education Commission which responsible post he held until 1971. He died on 23 April 1973.

== Family life ==
He married Margaret Russell in 1927. She was a concert pianist he met while he was a student at the London School of Oriental Studies. The marriage lasted only three years until her early death, and produced a daughter Chitra who excelled in classical music (piano). He thereafter married Lyle, they had three sons and two daughters. His sons were Indrajith, Arjun and Vijaya. Vijaya studied law at the University of Cambridge and was called to the English Bar as Barrister-at-Law. His second daughter became a science graduate.

== Honours ==
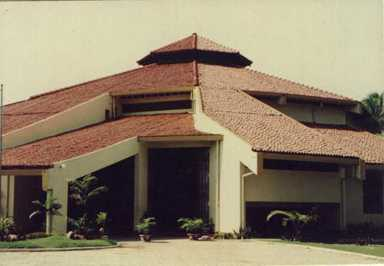
Malalasekara Theatre of Nalanda College Colombo

- Officer of the Order of the British Empire (Civil Division) (1949 Birthday Honours)
- Justice of the Peace
- Professor Emeritus of the University of Ceylon
- Honorary Doctor of Letters, Vidyodaya University of Ceylon
- Honorary Doctor of Philosophy, University of Moscow
- Membre d'Honneur of École française d'Extrême-Orient
- Commander of the Royal Order of Monisaraphon
- Buddha Sasana Vepulla Hitadhara from the Supreme Council of Buddhist Monks, Burma

== See also ==
- Sri Lankan Non Career Diplomats
- Malalasekara Theater
