= April 1974 =

Month of 1974

<<	April 1974					>>
Su	Mo	Tu	We	Th	Fr	Sa
	1	2	3	4	5	6
7	8	9	10	11	12	13
14	15	16	17	18	19	20
21	22	23	24	25	26	27
28	29	30

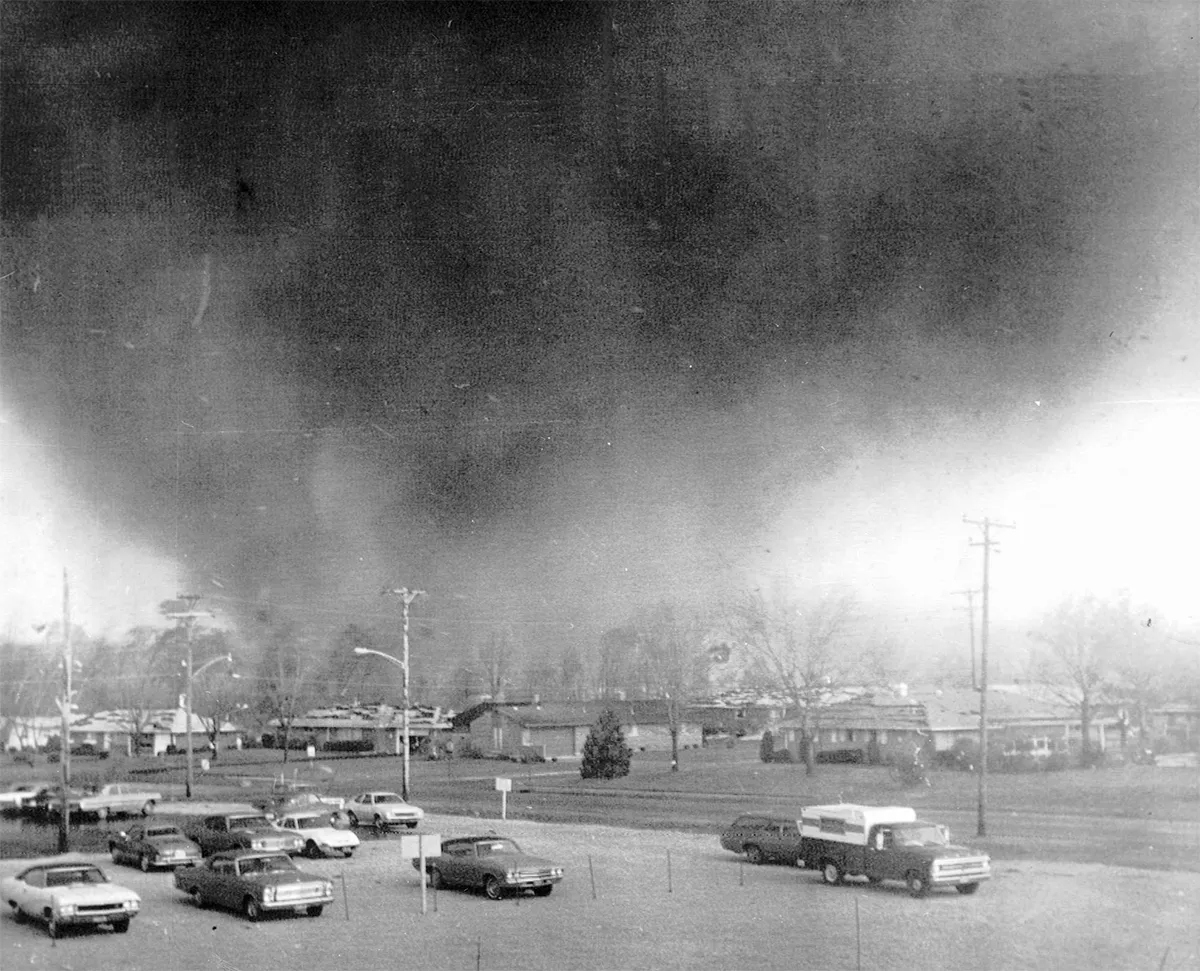
April 3, 1974: Tornadoes kill 319 people in U.S. and Canada, and 36 in Xenia, Ohio (pictured)

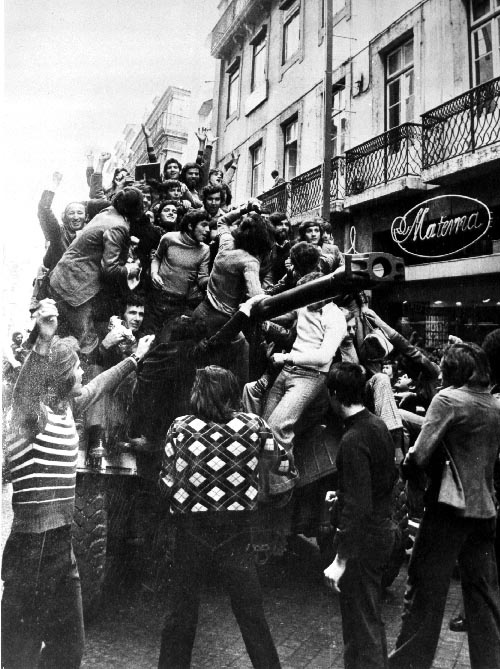
April 25, 1974: "Carnation Revolution" overthrows right-wing dictatorship of Portugal after 41 years

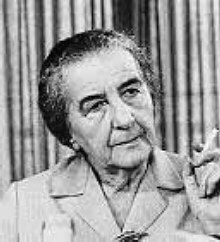
April 10, 1974: Israel's Prime Minister Golda Meir resigns after she is blamed for failure of 1973 Yom Kippur War

The following events occurred in April 1974:

== April 1, 1974 (Monday) ==
- Britain's Local Government Act 1972, the most comprehensive reform of the political subdivisions of England and Wales, went into effect, changing the number of counties from 52 (39 in England and 13 in Wales) to 45 (six metropolitan counties and 39 non-metropolitan counties). The Act had been given royal assent by Queen Elizabeth II on October 26, 1972. Among the major changes were that Staffordshire, Warwickshire and Worcestershire were merged into the new metropolitan county of West Midlands, County Durham and Northumberland consolidated into the new Tyne and Wear, and Nottinghamshire became part of the new South Yorkshire.
- The Communist nation of North Korea officially abolished the levying of income taxes, with national leader Kim Il-sung calling taxes "remnants of an antiquated society", raising revenue instead through user fees and deductions from profits on all of the nation's state-owned enterprises.
- Five days after the Mariner 10 interplanetary probe made findings that suggested that the planet Mercury had a satellite, tentatively named "Charley" by astronomer A. Lyle Broadfoot of the Kitt Peak National Observatory, Broadfoot declared that the change in ultraviolet radiation intensity turned out to have been from a distant star, 31 Crateris, located 3,000 light years from Earth.
- Near Sitka, Alaska, black smoke rose from the crater of the dormant volcano Mount Edgecumbe, which had not erupted for more than four centuries, though the threat of an eruption proved to be an elaborate practical joke. Local prankster Porky Bickar had chartered a helicopter for six hours, flown over the site, and dropped 70 old kerosene-doused tires, diesel fuel, a gallon of sterno, a dozen smoke bombs, and oily rags, into the volcano's crater then lit them on fire, in an attempt to fool people into believing that the volcano had become active again and would erupt. He had spray painted in the snow "APRIL FOOL". Later reports noted that "few Sitka residents stirred" at "somebody's idea of an April Fool joke." Smoke was visible from Sitka "for about 25 minutes".
- Died: Hal Boyle, 63, U.S. journalist and Pulitzer Prize winner

== April 2, 1974 (Tuesday) ==
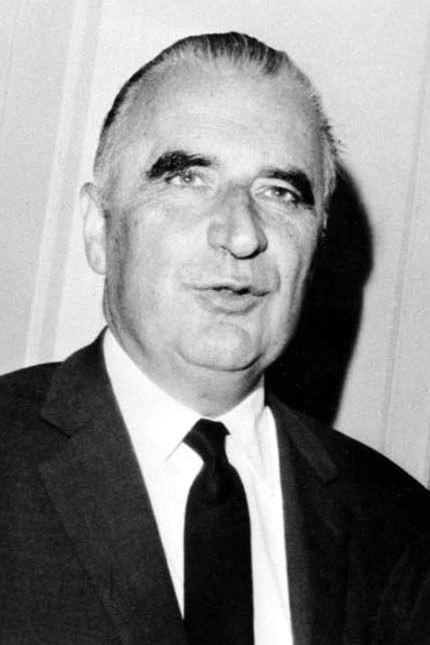
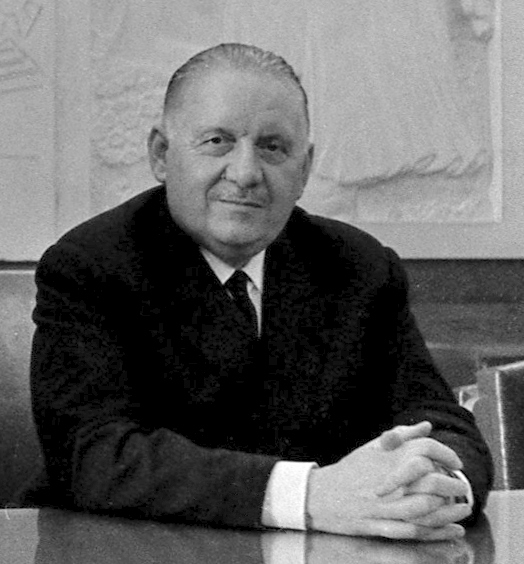
Georges Pompidou and Alain Poher
- The day after Newsweek magazine's April 8 issue revealed that Georges Pompidou, President of France since 1969, was ill with cancer and might soon be resigning, the President's office abruptly canceled that day's scheduled meeting with the President of Rwanda, Juvénal Habyarimana, followed by a cancellation of all engagements for the rest of the week because of illness. Pompidou stayed home at his private apartment on Quai de Bethune on the Île Saint-Louis in Paris, and was found dead at 9:00 in the evening. The Agence France-Presse news agency sent a bulletin at 9:58 announcing "M. Pompidou c'est mort." Pompidou, who was later found to have complications from Waldenström macroglobulinemia, a form of leukemia, was 62. Before becoming president, he had served as prime minister from 1962 to 1968. The President of the French Senate, Alain Poher, became the Acting President of France until an election could be held to determine a new President. Poher had previously served as acting president after the death of President Charles de Gaulle, until Pompidou's election as president.
- The Agranat Commission, chaired by the President of the Supreme Court of Israel, issued its report assessing blame for Israel's failures in the 1973 Yom Kippur War, with recommendations for dismissal of General David Elazar (Chief of Staff of the Israel Defense Forces); Major General Eli Zeira, director of the military intelligence for the agency Agaf HaModi'in), Brigadier-General Aryeh Shalev (head of research at the Agaf HaModi'in), and Major General Shmuel Gonen, leader of the Southern Front defense against Egypt. Following the report, the government of Prime Minister Golda Meir would fall.
- The 46th Academy Awards ceremony was held in the U.S. at the Dorothy Chandler Pavilion in Los Angeles. The Sting won seven awards, including Best Picture, Best Director (George Roy Hill), and Best Original Screenplay (David S. Ward). Best Actor and Actress awards were given to Jack Lemmon and Glenda Jackson, while the Best Supporting Actor and Actress awards went to 71-year-old John Houseman and 10-year-old Tatum O'Neal, who became the youngest actress ever to receive an Oscar.
- Born: Håkan Hellström, Swedish pop musician; in Gothenburg
- Died:
  - Douglass Dumbrille, 84, Canadian stage, film and TV actor (b. 1889)
  - Olga Burgoyne, 95, African-American choreographer and actress

== April 3, 1974 (Wednesday) ==
- A system of 148 confirmed tornadoes killed 319 people and injured 5,484 others in 13 of the U.S. states (Alabama, Kentucky, Indiana, Tennessee, Ohio, Georgia, North Carolina, Illinois, Michigan, Virginia and West Virginia) and the Canadian province of Ontario. Hardest hit was the city of Xenia, Ohio, where 36 residents were killed after the tornado struck at 4:40 p.m. local time. Other areas struck were Brandenburg, Kentucky (31 dead) and Guin, Alabama (28 dead). The area in and around Tanner, Alabama, was struck by two tornadoes 30 minutes apart, killing 44 people.
- The FIBA European Champions Cup, emblematic of the professional basketball championship of Europe, was won by Spain's Real Madrid Baloncesto in an 84 to 82 defeat of Italy's Pallacanestro Varese in a final before a sellout crowd at the Palais des Sports de Beaulieu in France. Wayne Brabender was the high scorer for Madrid with 28 points while Bob Morse of Varese had 24 points.
- The White House Press Office announced that the Internal Revenue Service had determined that U.S. President Richard Nixon owed $432,787.13 in back taxes and an additional $43,644 in penalties and interest, an amount almost half of Nixon's stated net worth. The ruling by the IRS disallowed deductions including a declaration one for $576,000 for the claimed worth of Nixon's vice-presidential papers.
- Two months after being kidnapped, Patty Hearst announced in an audiotape that she had joined her captors at the Symbionese Liberation Army and that she had adopted the name "Tania" for the SLA.
- Born: Juliana Awada, Argentine businesswoman who served as First Lady of the Argentine Nation from 2015 to 2019; in Villa Ballester
- Died: Andor Kertész, 45, Hungarian mathematician, died of a chronic illness

== April 4, 1974 (Thursday) ==
- In Northern Ireland, the 1966 ban against the Ulster Volunteer Force was lifted by order of Merlyn Rees, Secretary of State for Northern Ireland.
- The crash of a Wenela Air Services flight in southern Africa killed 78 of the 84 people on board. The Douglas DC-4 went down shortly after takeoff from Francistown in Botswana after departing toward Blantyre in Malawi. Most of the dead were Malawian gold miners who were returning home.
- In Cincinnati, baseball player Hank Aaron of the Atlanta Braves hit his 714th home run on the first swing of his bat to open the 1974 Major League Baseball season and tied the career record set by Babe Ruth, in a 7 to 6 loss to the Cincinnati Reds. While the Braves wanted to keep him out of the opening three-game series against the Reds so that the record could be tied and broken at home in Atlanta, Commissioner of Baseball Bowie Kuhn had ruled that Aaron was required to play at least two of the three Cincinnati games. On April 7, Aaron came up to bat three times in a 5 to 3 win over the Reds, striking out twice and grounding out once.
- Women in Jordan were granted the right to vote in elections for the first time. However, the suspension of parliamentary democracy prevented the right of suffrage from being exercised except in local elections.
- Voting was held for 28 of the 31 seats of the new House of Assembly of the British colony of the Gilbert and Ellice Islands, now the nations of Kiribati (Gilbert Islands) and Tuvalu (Ellice Islands).
- Born:
  - Dave Mirra, American bicycle motocross (BMX) rider last inducted into the BMX Hall of Fame; in Chittenango, New York (committed suicide, 2016)
  - Glenn Lyse, Norwegian pop music singer; in Stavanger

== April 5, 1974 (Friday) ==
- A major development in x-ray astronomy was achieved with discovery of "the first indication of strong coronal emission from stars" when astronomer Richard Catura detected x-ray luminosity from the star Capella (Alpha Aurigae), almost 43 light years from Earth, that was more than 10,000 times as much as the x-ray luminosity of the Sun. The detection was made by accident, in that the intended mission of a rocket-borne launch of instruments was simply to calibrate the directional accuracy of the stellar sensors.
- In Vientiane, the capital of Laos, a new government was formed giving power for the first time to the Communist Pathet Lao, led by Prince Souphanouvong, chairman of the powerful new 48-person National Political Council, and his older half-brother, Prime Minister Souvanna Phouma. Souvanna Phouma and Souphanouvong were two of the 24 children of Chao Maha Oupahat Bounkhong, the late Uparaja of Luang Prabang. After having spent years in hiding during a fight against the Western-backed regime of Souvanna Phouma, Souphanouvong made his first public appearance in Laos, with his half-brother, at a ceremony at the Buddhist Ong Tu Temple, where both took a pledge to work together for the benefit of the Lao people.
- Carrie, the debut novel by high school teacher Stephen King, was published by Doubleday, launching his career as the "King of Horror".
- Died:
  - Jennifer Vyvyan, 49, British opera soprano, died of a bronchial illness.
  - Richard Crossman, 66, British M.P. and Leader of the House of Commons, 1966 to 1968
  - Fred Snodgrass, 86, retired American MLB baseball outfielder, later known for being the mayor of Oxnard, California, remembered for his crucial error in the 1912 World Series that cost the New York Giants the championship.
  - A. Y. Jackson, 91, Canadian landscape painter and a founding member of the "Group of Seven"
  - S. P. Kodandapani, 42, Indian film score composer

== April 6, 1974 (Saturday) ==
- A massive fire, started accidentally by "a 10-year-old boy playing with matches" swept through the Lincoln National Forest in the U.S. state of New Mexico and the small towns of Weed and Sacramento, New Mexico, causing $38 million worth of damage, including 21 homes and buildings, and scorching 14,469 acres (5,855 ha) of land.
- The California Jam, a rock festival held at the Ontario Motor Speedway in the Los Angeles suburb of Ontario California, attracted 250,000 paying spectators who came to see headliners Deep Purple and Emerson Lake & Palmer, along with the Eagles, Earth, Wind & Fire, Black Sabbath, Seals and Crofts, Rare Earth and Black Oak Arkansas.
- The Swedish pop group ABBA's song Waterloo won the 1974 Eurovision Song Contest in Brighton, England.
- Born: Robert Kovač, West German-born Croatian footballer with 84 caps for the Croatia national team; in West Berlin
- Died:
  - Sir Hudson Fysh, 79, Australian aviator and founder of the Australian airline Qantas
  - Cardinal Štěpán Trochta, 69, the only Roman Catholic Cardinal for Czechoslovakia, died of a cerebral hemorrhage. Trochta, who had survived years in a Nazi concentration camp and later in a Czechoslovak prison from 1953 to 1963 under Communist rule, had secretly been elevated to the cardinalate in 1969 by Pope Paul VI.
  - Willem Marinus Dudok, 89, Dutch modernist architect

== April 7, 1974 (Sunday) ==
- The last goalkeeper in the National Hockey League (NHL) to play without a mask, the Pittsburgh Penguins' Andy Brown, played his final NHL game. Brown would play for three more seasons in the World Hockey Association (WHA) for the Indianapolis Racers in 1976.
- Died: Bobby Buntrock, 21, American child actor known for portraying Harold Baxter on the TV sitcom Hazel starting in 1961 as a 9-year-old, was found dead inside his overturned car which had fallen into Battle Creek in the city limits of Keystone, South Dakota, the victim of a drowning.

== April 8, 1974 (Monday) ==
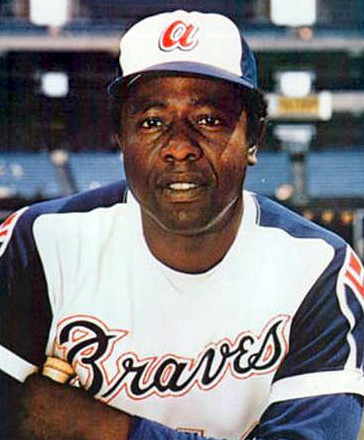
Hank Aaron

- Hank Aaron of the Atlanta Braves hit his 715th career home run in a 7 to 4 win over the Los Angeles Dodgers, breaking the record held by Babe Ruth since Ruth's retirement in 1935. Earlier in the game, Aaron had broken another mark set by another Hall of Fame player, Willie Mays's National League record of 2,062 runs scored in a career. Aaron would retire in 1976 with a career record of 755 home runs.
- U.S. President Richard Nixon signed legislation raising the federal minimum wage, effective May 1, 1974, from $1.60/hour to $2.00/hour, to reach $2.10/hour in 1975 and $2.30 in 1976.
- In France, Parti socialiste Chairman François Mitterrand and incumbent Finance Minister Valéry Giscard d'Estaing filed on the same day to be candidates for the May 5 presidential election. Giscard became the third member of the Gaullist Party (officially the Union des Démocrates pour la République or UDR) to enter the race, after former Prime Minister Jacques Chaban-Delmas and Assemblée nationale president Edgar Faure. Mitterrand was endorsed as well by the Parti communiste français (PCF) and the Parti socialiste unifié(PSU), both of which announced that they would not field a separate candidate. Giscard declared his candidacy in the town of Chamalières, where he was Mayor in addition to being Finance Minister. Faure dropped out of the race after Giscard's entrance.
- The U.S. Senate voted, 55 to 21, to make the first Tuesday after the first Monday in November— election day in the United States— as a paid federal holiday in even-numbered years, starting in 1976. The measure came as a bipartisan amendment offered by Republican Barry Goldwater and Democrat Hubert H. Humphrey, both of whom had lost presidential elections in 1964 and 1968, respectively. Despite passing the Senate, however, the bill did not make it to a vote in the U.S. House of Representatives.
- Born: Chris Kyle, American sniper for the U.S. Navy SEALs, later a best-selling author; in Odessa, Texas. In the course of his career, he had 160 confirmed kills of targets between 2003 and 2009 during the Iraq War. Kyle was shot and killed with his own .45 caliber pistol by another retired Navy SEAL in 2013.
- Died: K. A. C. Creswell, 94, English architectural historian

== April 9, 1974 (Tuesday) ==
- Australia's Prime Minister Gough Whitlam announced that "Advance Australia Fair" would replace "God Save the Queen" as the national anthem, based on a survey of 60,000 people (0.05% of Australians at the time). The choice quickly became unpopular because of the lyrics, although Whitlam said that the tune would be used and that the words would go unsung. The melody would remain and the lyrics would be modified effective April 19, 1984.
- The first 1973–1974 Whitbread Round the World Race, which had started on September 8, 1973, as 17 yachts departed the English port of Portsmouth, was won by Ramón Carlin and his 11-man crew from Mexico on the Sayula II. The yacht arrived in Portsmouth 152 days after it had departed.
- The explosion of the Greek oil tanker Elias killed 13 people at Fort Mifflin port in Philadelphia. A U.S. Coast Guard investigation would note that as of 1977, "Nine members of the crew and four visitors (relatives of the master) perished or are missing," with eight bodies recovered and five others never found, but could not find a cause for the disaster.
- Born:
  - Alexander Pichushkin, Russian serial murderer known as "The Chessboard Killer" for at least 49 homicides between 1992 and his arrest in 2006; in Mytishchi, Russian SFSR, Soviet Union
  - Jenna Jameson (stage name for Jenna Marie Massoli), American adult film actress and model who bills herself as "The Queen of Porn"; in Las Vegas
  - Died: Emelie Hooke, 61, Australian opera soprano

== April 10, 1974 (Wednesday) ==
- Israel's Prime Minister, Golda Meir, announced her resignation as Premier and as leader of the Israeli Labor Party, nine days after the release of the Agranat Commission report. Meir's decision came after a meeting of the 51 members of her Alignment party coalition, when she told reporters "I've had enough." Her colleague, Yitzhak Aharon, then told the group "The prime minister has announced her resignation." Rather than schedule new elections, the Israeli Labor Party announced on April 21 that they would try to form a new government of ministers.
- Australia's Prime Minister, Gough Whitlam, announced that he had asked the Governor-General to dissolve the Australian House of Representatives and to schedule new elections at the same time as an already-scheduled Senate election. Whitlam's request for a "double dissolution" came hours after the Australian Senate refused to approve a $170 million spending bill to prevent the government from shutting down. After the announcement of double dissolution, the Senate approved further government funding.
- Akbar Etemad, known for founding Iran's nuclear energy and weapons program, was appointed as the first president of the new Atomic Energy Organization of Iran and given an additional post as Deputy Prime Minister.
- Born: Eric Greitens, U.S. politician who served as Governor Missouri for 16 months in 2017 and 2018 before resigning in disgrace; in St. Louis
- Died: Patricia Collinge, Irish-born American stage and film actress; in Dublin

== April 11, 1974 (Thursday) ==
- A terrorist attack killed 18 people, including eight children, as three members of the Popular Front for the Liberation of Palestine (PFLP) crossed from Lebanon into the town of Kiryat Shmona in Israel. The PFLP guerrillas had originally invaded the town's elementary school, but the school was closed for the Passover holiday.
- The bipartisan Judiciary Committee of the U.S. House of Representatives voted, 33 to 3, to subpoena U.S. President Nixon to submit the actual tape recordings of 42 specific conversations in the Oval Office, after the repeated refusal by the White House to comply with previous requests.
- A jury in Pennsylvania convicted former United Mine Workers of America (UMWA) president W. A. "Tony" Boyle of the 1969 murder of his union rival, Joseph "Jock" Yablonski and Yablonski's wife and daughter.
- Police in The Hague arrested Jacobus P. Phillipps, a Netherlands native who had served as an officer for the Nazi German SS during World War II, after Phillips had spent more than 29 years hiding in his parents home. Since 1945, Phillips had stayed inside the home and had been given a death sentence after being convicted of war crimes in absentia in 1950. Phillipps was taken to Scheveninger Prison and then transferred to Assen, where his conviction had taken place.
- Born:
  - Àlex Corretja, Spanish tennis player and winner of the 1998 ATP Finals; in Barcelona
  - Tricia Helfer, Canadian actress and model known for the U.S. TV series Lucifer; in Donalda, Alberta
  - Trot Nixon, American baseball player; in Durham, North Carolina

== April 12, 1974 (Friday) ==
- After a siege of more than a year by North Vietnam's People's Army of Vietnam (PAVN), the 92nd Ranger Battalion of South Vietnam's Army of the Republic of Viet Nam (ARVN) surrendered the Tonle Cham Camp, only 60 miles (97 km) from the South Vietnamese capital, Saigon.
- The collision of the 999-ton South Korean freighter Hae Yung and the 21,467-ton American container ship President Pierce killed 15 of the freighter's 24-man crew, when the vessel split in half and sank quickly in the Sea of Japan.
- Born:
  - Marley Shelton, American film and TV actress best known for the TV series Eleventh Hour; in Los Angeles
  - Sylvinho (Sylvio Mendes Campos Júnior), Brazilian footballer with six caps for the Brazil national team, later coach of the Albania national football team; in São Paulo
- Died: Arthur Krock, 87, U.S. newspaper journalist known for his syndicated column "In the Nation", and winner of two Pulitzer Prizes

== April 13, 1974 (Saturday) ==
- Westar 1, the first commercial geostationary satellite, was launched from Cape Canaveral in the United States by NASA on behalf of the Western Union communications company.
- Born: Ahmed Ghailani, Tanzanian conspirator convicted for the bombing of the U.S. embassies in Tanzania on August 7, 1998; in Zanzibar City

== April 14, 1974 (Sunday) ==
- Australia's Governor-General, Sir Paul Hasluck, ordered that elections take place on May 18 for a new parliament.
- Ethiopia's Emperor Haile Selassie announced that his 20-year-old grandson, Zera Yacob Amha Selassie, would be the heir to the throne. The Emperor made the nomination after Crown Prince Amha Selassie became ill. Haile Selassie would be overthrown five months later, on September 12, 1974.
- Golfer Gary Player of South Africa won the 1974 Masters Tournament by two shots over Dave Stockton and Tom Wieskopf.
- Born:
  - Quentin Dupieux, French film director best known for Wrong Cops, and as a musician who performs under the stage name "Mr. Oizo"; in Paris
  - Da Brat (stage name for Shawntae Harris), American rap artist and the first female rapper to sell over one million copies of an album; in Chicago
- Died:
  - Howard Pease, 79, American paperback writer known for his series of Tod Moran mysteries published from 1926 to 1961
  - Jefferson Caffery, 87, American diplomat who served at different times as the U.S. Ambassador to El Salvador, Colombia, Cuba, Brazil, France and Egypt.

== April 15, 1974 (Monday) ==
- A coup d'état led by Lieutenant Colonel Seyni Kountché overthrew the government of the West African nation of Niger and its first president, Hamani Diori. As the second President of Niger, Kountché would rule for 13 years until his death in 1987.
- Voters in the tiny Himalayan mountain kingdom of Sikkim went to the polls for the first, and last democratic election in the nation to select a 32-member assembly from 121 candidates. After runoff elections on April 22 for 18 seats where no candidate had won a majority, the Sikkim Congress Party, won a majority of the votes.
- Ivor Bell, the leader of the Provisional Irish Republican Army terrorist group in Northern Ireland, walked out of Maze Prison in Belfast, only seven weeks after he had been captured. Bell took a release order from, and posed as, another prisoner, Jimmy Walsh, who was being given a four-day furlough for a scheduled wedding. Bell was recaptured 13 days later.

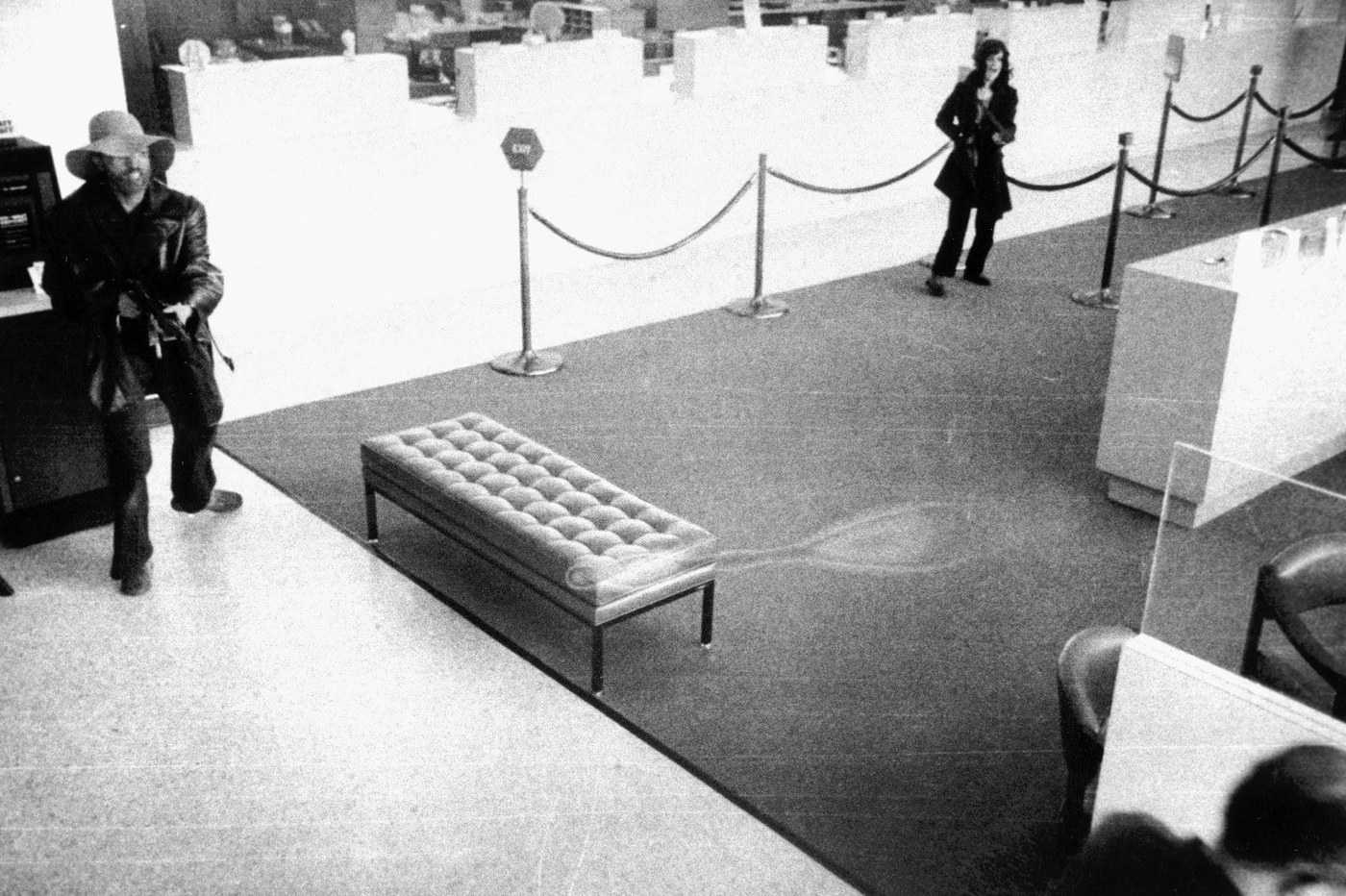
Kidnap victim turned bank robber, Patty Hearst, aka Tania

- Kidnapping victim Patricia Hearst, who had recently announced that she was joining the Symbionese Liberation Army that had been her captors for two months, turned to crime and aided in a bank robbery. Hearst, who had adopted the SLA alias "Tania", was photographed holding an automatic weapon while inside a branch of the Hibernia Bank at 1450 Noriega Street in San Francisco.
- Born:
  - Tim Thomas, American ice hockey goaltender, winner of the NHL's Vezina Trophy in 2009 and 2011, and the 2011 Conn Smythe Trophy; in Flint, Michigan
  - Leilani Rorani, New Zealand squash player, British Open winner in women's singles 1999 and 2000, ranked No. 1 in the world by the Women's International Squash Players Association (WISPA) November 2000 to September 2001; in Hamilton
  - Danny Pino, American TV and stage actor, known for the series Cold Case; in Miami
- Died:
  - Princess Irene, Duchess of Aosta, 70, former member of Greek royalty as the daughter of King Constantine I, sister of George II, Alexander I, and King Paul I
  - Aissa Diori, First Lady of Niger since 1960 as the wife of President Hamani Diori, was shot and killed during the coup d'état that ended the Diori government.

== April 16, 1974 (Tuesday) ==
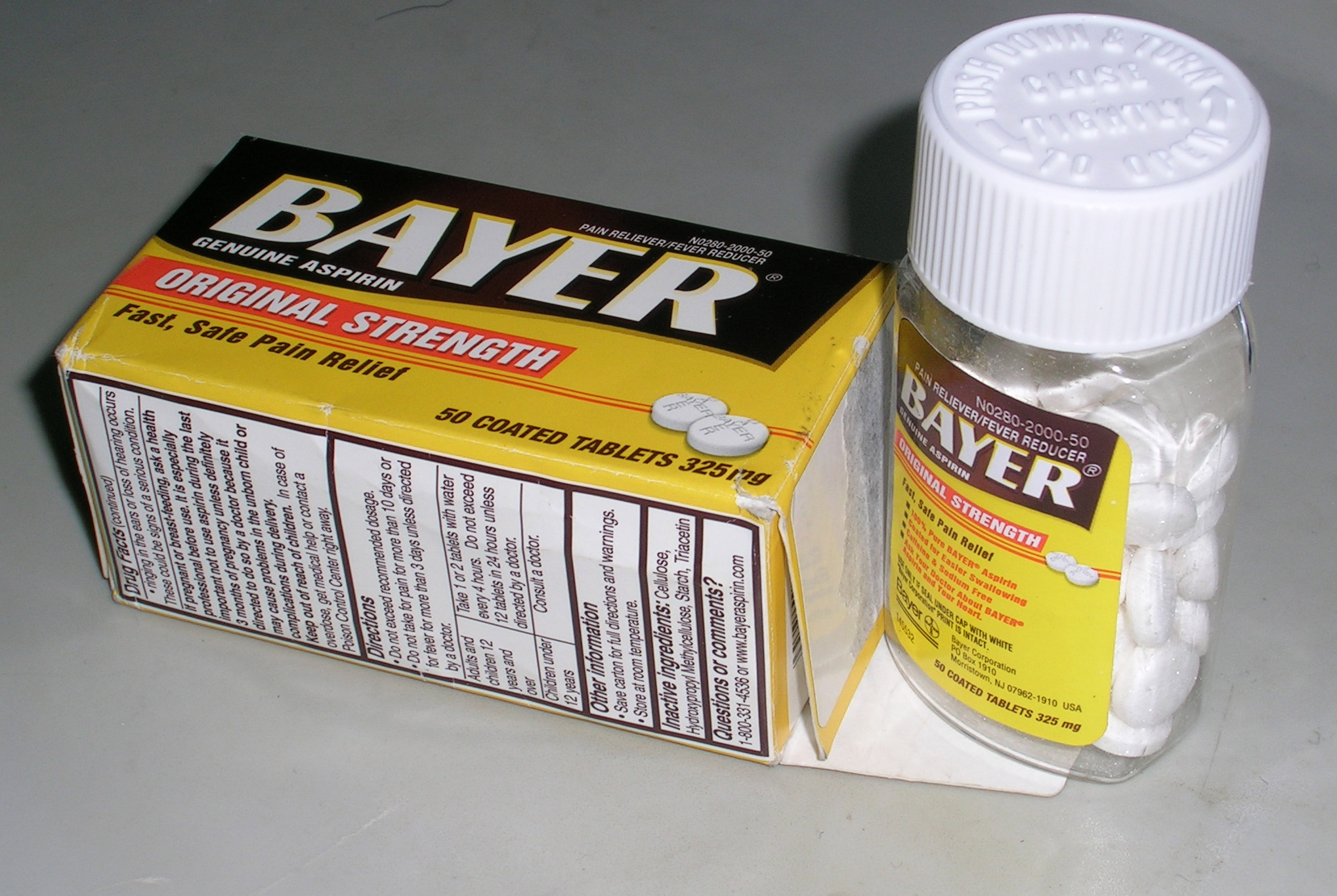
"Push down and turn to open"

- In the U.S., a federal law took effect requiring that nearly all prescription medicines from pharmacies would be distributed in bottles with "child-proof" caps. The law made exceptions, including for medicines that needed to be used quickly. The legislation followed reports of accidents involving children opening household packaging and ingesting the contents.
- The British rock band Queen played their first concert in the United States, appearing at the auditorium at Regis University in Denver.
- Born: Xu Jinglei, Chinese film actress and director, known for starring in Spring Subway and directing My Father and I; in Beijing
- Died:
  - Johnston Murray, 71, the first Native American to be elected a Governor of U.S. state as the son of a mother from the Chickasaw Nation and a father who was a Chickasaw citizen, having governed Oklahoma from 1951 to 1955
  - Gustave Daladier, 86, French flying ace who had 12 shootdowns in aerial combat in World War I

== April 17, 1974 (Wednesday) ==
- The public court-martial of 63 Chilean Air Force officers and enlisted men began in the chapel of the Air Force War College in Santiago on accusations of sedition or treason. Prosecutors asked that six of the defendants be sentenced to death for espionage.
- A group of rebels in the Egyptian military, including 16 cadets, attacked the Technical Military Academy in Cairo, killing 11 people and wounding 27 others as part of an alleged plot, financed by Libya, to overthrow President Anwar Sadat. Although the Egyptian government initially described reports about the incident as false, 75 members of the military would be arrested over the next 10 days, including the alleged leader, Dr. Saleh Abdullah Sariya of the Islamic Liberation Organization.
- Three days after leading a coup d'detat, Seyni Kountché named a 12-man council to run the West African nation and proclaimed himself the Chief of State as Chairman of the Council.
- Born:
  - Victoria Beckham, English singer best known as "Posh Spice" for the Spice Girls; in Goff's Oak, Hertfordshire
  - Mikael Åkerfeldt, Swedish heavy metal guitarist; in Stockholm
- Died:
  - Frank McGee, 52, American TV journalist and co-host of the NBC Today show since 1971, died of multiple myeloma six days after his last newscast.
  - Blossom Seeley (stage name for Minnie Guyer), 87, American singer and dancer billed as the "Queen of Syncopation"
  - Vinnie Taylor (stage name for Christopher H. Donald), 25, guitarist for the group Sha Na Na, was found in a motel at Charlottesville, Virginia, dead of an accidental heroin overdose, two days after a concert at the University of Virginia.

== April 18, 1974 (Thursday) ==
- In response to the Zebra murders that had claimed 14 lives in California since October 20, San Francisco Mayor Joseph Alioto and the San Francisco City Police instituted "Operation Zebra", stopping African-American men throughout the city for interrogations and the recording of identifying information. Over the next six days, 567 black men were stopped and 181 interrogated without yielding any information helpful to finding the Zebra murderers. U.S. District Judge Alfonso Zirpoli ruled that stopping suspects without probable cause was unconstitutional.
- U.S. District Judge John J. Sirica ordered President Nixon to release 64 specific tape recordings that had been subpoenaed by the Watergate special prosecutor, Leon Jaworski, and to do so by May 2. The White House declined to comment on whether it would comply with the order.
- Born:
  - Edgar Wright, English film director known for Shaun of the Dead; in Poole, Dorset
  - Mark Tremonti, American rock guitarist and singer, co-founder of the band Creed; in Detroit
  - Lorraine Pilkington, Irish actress known for Human Traffic; in Dublin
- Died:
  - Betty Compson, 77, American actress known for The Barker
  - Marcel Pagnol, 79, French novelist, playwright and filmmaker

== April 19, 1974 (Friday) ==
- The government of Sri Lanka, led by Prime Minister Sirimavo Bandaranaike closed down 13 newspapers in the Asian nation under the Emergency Defence Regulations, after their editors had criticized the government. Shut down until further notice were Chinthamani, Dawasa, Dinapathi, Gitanjali, Iranama, Rasakatha, Riviresa, Sawasa, Sundari, The Sun, Thanthi, Tikiri and Visitura, all printed in Colombo. Most of the papers would remain closed for almost three years.
- All eight Israeli Defense Force members on a Sikorsky CH-53 Sea Stallion helicopter were killed when it collided with another CH-53 over an airport in Rosh Pinna, a town located near the Golan Heights and the border with Syria. The other helicopter was able to land safely.
- TMI-1, the first of three units of the Three Mile Island Nuclear Generating Station near Harrisburg, Pennsylvania, in the U.S., came online and would begin supplying electrical power on September 2. The second unit, TMI-2, would begin operating in late 1978 but become involved in a nuclear accident on March 28, 1979.
- An Alabama Department of Public Safety trooper, 51-year-old Kenyon M. Lassiter, was struck and killed by a hit-and-run driver, Kennith Ray Barton, 33, whose life Lassiter had saved months earlier after an automobile accident.
- Born:
  - G. R. Indugopan, Indian Malayalam novelist; in Valathungal, Kerala state
  - Akara Amarttayakul, Thai film actor; in Bangkok
- Died:
  - General Ayub Khan, 66, President of Pakistan from 1958 to 1969
  - Major Stephen Price, 80, British Royal Air Force officer and flying ace in World War I

== April 20, 1974 (Saturday) ==
- French archaeologist Françoise Claustre was taken hostage by rebels led by future Chadian president Hissène Habré in the north African nation of Chad, at the town of Bardaï, beginning an ordeal that would last almost three years. Captured with her was Dr. Christophe Staewen of West Germany (who would be released on June 11 following payment of a ransom), and Frenchman Marc Combe, who would escape his captors. Françoise's husband Pierre would be captured by the same rebels 16 months later while trying to negotiate his wife's release. The two would finally be released on February 1, 1977.
- Former South Korean President Yun Posun was secretly arrested at his home for donating more than US$1,000 to a Christian minister for delivery to a student group calling for a return to democracy. Yun, who had been president from 1960 to 1962, had run as a candidate against President Park Chung Hee in elections in 1963 and 1967, was detained without any announcement of his arrest from the government or in the government-regulated South Korean press, and his arrest would not be discovered by the Western press until June 10.
- The U.S. state of Louisiana adopted its 11th state constitution since attaining statehood, upon a 58 percent approval by voters in a referendum. The new document, at 35,000 words, was more than one-eighth the size of the previous 250,000-word size document.
- Born: Marko Blagojevic, Serbian politician, Minister for Public Investments, in Belgrade, SR Serbia, SFR Yugoslavia
- Died: Peter Lee Lawrence (stage name for Karl Hyrenbach), 30, German film actor known for spaghetti western films, including Fury of Johnny Kid, died of glioblastoma following surgery.

== April 21, 1974 (Sunday) ==
- In the first multiparty elections since 1958 in the South American nation of Colombia, Liberal Party candidate Alfonso López Michelsen, whose father Alfonso López Pumarejo had been president twice (1934–1938 and 1942–1946), won 56% of the vote. Each of the three major candidates had had a father who had been a president, with the Conservative Party's Álvaro Gómez Hurtado (son of Laureano Gómez, president 1950–1953) receiving 31% of the vote, and María Eugenia Rojas Correa (daughter of Gustavo Rojas Pinilla, president 1953–1957) of ANAPO receiving less than 10%.
- Taisir al-Arouri, a Palestinian professor of mathematics at Birzeit University on the West Bank, was arrested by Israeli police. He would be detained, without any charges brought against him, for the night on 21 April 1974 and released on January 18, 1978, after Amnesty International's bringing of his case to worldwide attention.
- Professional soccer football competition in Austria was reorganized with the founding of Österreichische Fussball-Bundesliga, composed of the top 10 clubs in the former Bundesliga in the First Division, and a 10-team second division. Each team played each of the nine others four times for a 36-match season, with the two with the worst record to be relegated to the second division and the top two of the second division being promoted.
- That Championship Season, the Tony Award-winning play by Jason Miller, closed on Broadway after exactly 700 performances. It began its run at the Booth Theatre on September 14, 1972.
- Born:
  - Oleksiy Zhuravko, Ukrainian member of parliament from 2006 to 2012, who later became a Russian citizen and politician and joined in Russia's 2022 war against Ukraine; in Zhovti Vody, Ukrainian SSR (killed in missile attack, 2022)
  - Craig Joiner, Scottish rugby union player with 25 caps for the Scotland national team; in Glasgow

== April 22, 1974 (Monday) ==
- All 107 passengers and crew on Pan Am Flight 812 were killed in a crash in Indonesia when the Boeing 707 crashed into the side of a mountain while approaching Denpasar as a stop on a flight from Hong Kong to Sydney in Australia. The remains of all the non-Asian victims were cremated, while those of Westerners, including 28 Americans, were buried in a mass grave.
- A group of five employees at "The Hi-Fi Shop", a home audio store in Ogden, Utah, were taken hostage by six robbers and tortured. One man and two women were brutally murdered. Three active duty airmen of the U.S. Air Force would be arrested, while three others would never be identified. Two of the arrested would be convicted of murder and executed, while the third would be convicted of robbery and spend 13 years in prison. The story would become the basis of a best-selling book, Victim: The Other Side of Murder, by Gary Kinder, published in 1982 and later adapted to a television film, Aftermath: A Test of Love.
- Operation Nimbus Star, the U.S. Navy's assistance in clearing the Suez Canal of explosive mines, began with minesweeping helicopters dispatched from amphibious assault ship USS Iwo Jima (LPH-2).

== April 23, 1974 (Tuesday) ==
- Following the resignation of Golda Meir as Prime Minister of Israel and as leader of the ruling Israeli Labor Party, the Labor Party's 552-member central committee chose between Labor Minister Yitzhak Rabin and Information Minister Shimon Peres. Rabin won the election, 298 to 254, and would take office as Prime Minister on June 3.
- Died: Cy Williams, 86, American MLB baseball outfielder known for having led the National League in home runs during four different seasons (1916, 1920, 1923, 1927)

== April 24, 1974 (Wednesday) ==
- Günter Guillaume, a personal adviser to West Germany's Chancellor Willy Brandt, was arrested on charges of espionage, after West German intelligence discovered that Guillaume was a spy for East Germany's Stasi security service. Brandt would resign as Chancellor 12 days later.
- Elections were held in South Africa for 169 of the 171 seats of the Volksraad, called in English the House of Assembly. Voting was limited to White voters, with non-White citizens not allowed suffrage in the white-minority ruled nation. The National Party of Prime Minister John Vorster increased its majority, winning 122 seats compared to only 41 for the United Party of De Villiers Graaff, whose party won a majority only in the province of Natal.
- Born:
  - Stephen Wiltshire, British architectural artist and autistic savant; in London
  - General Muhoozi Kainerugaba, Ugandan military officer, former commander of the Uganda People's Defence Force (UPDF) and son of President Yoweri Museveni and First Lady Janet Kataaha Museveni; in Dar es Salaam in Tanzania
- Died:

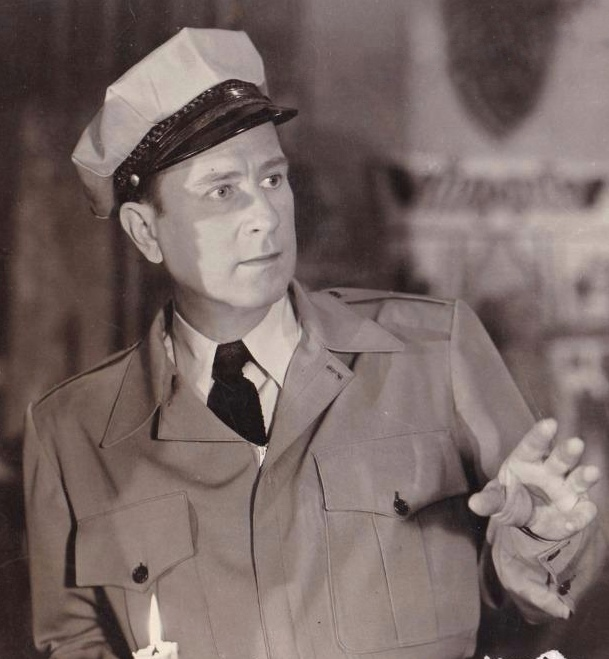
Bud Abbott

  - William "Bud" Abbott, 76, American comedian and film actor who served as the straight man in the duo of Abbott and Costello; his co-star, Lou Costello, had died in 1959.
  - Franz Jonas, 74, President of Austria since 1965; Chancellor Bruno Kreisky would serve as acting president until a presidential election on June 23 and the inauguration of Rudolf Kirchschläger on July 8.

== April 25, 1974 (Thursday) ==
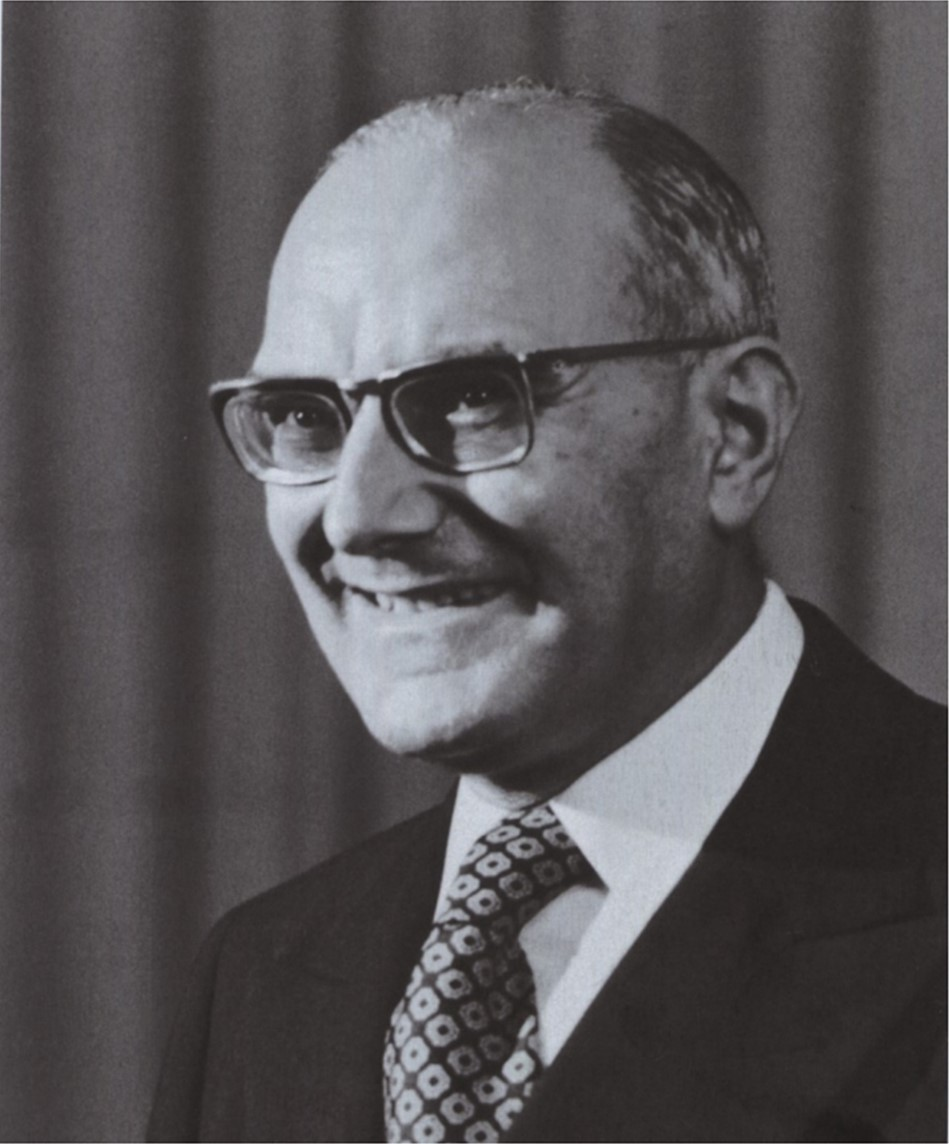
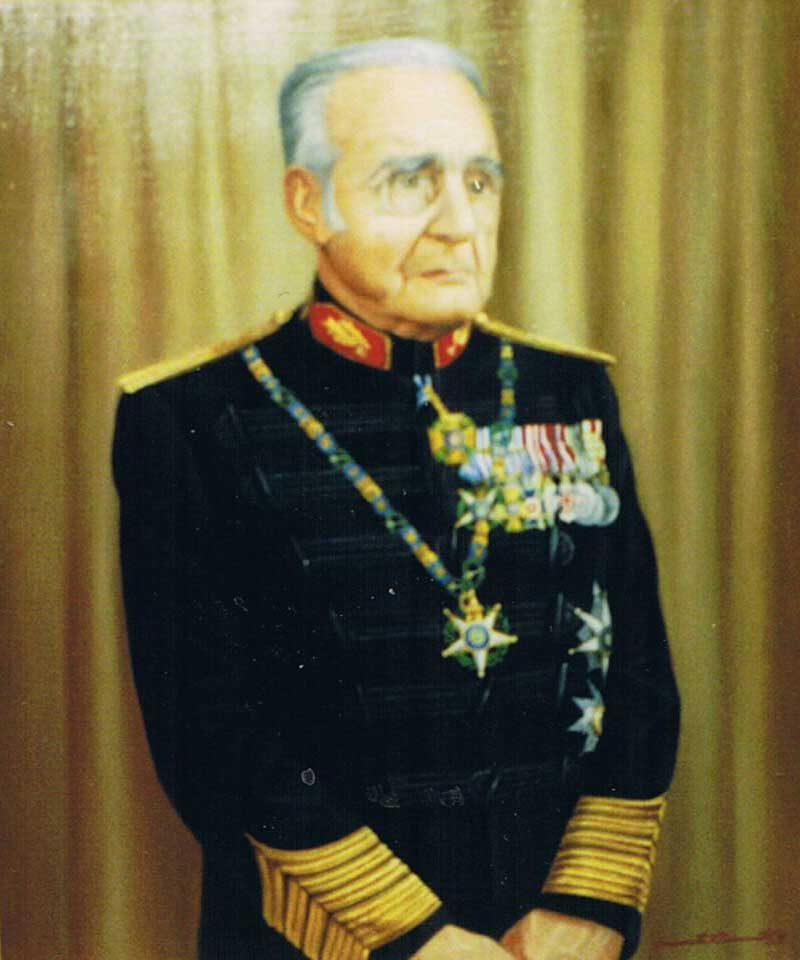
Premier Caetano and General Spínola
- The "Carnation Revolution" (in Portuguese, Revolução dos Cravos) began at 12:20 a.m. throughout Portugal after a pre-arranged signal— the playing of the song "Grândola, Vila Morena"— was broadcast on the Lisbon radio station Rádio Renascença. The Movimento das Forças Armadas (MFA), a group of Portuguese military officers led by recently fired General António de Spínola, carried out a coup d'état to end 41 years of dictatorial rule by the Estado Novo. Thousands of Portuguese civilians joined the military insurgents in a popular revolution. Prime Minister Marcelo Caetano relented at 6:00 in the morning and fled the country for political asylum in Brazil.
- The Korean Central Intelligence Agency (KCIA) carried out the arrest, without warrants, of 1,024 dissidents throughout South Korea on charges of violation of the National Security Act. Of those, 253 would be imprisoned and eight would be executed on April 9, 1975.
- A landslide killed more than 450 people in the valley of the Mantaro River in Peru, including at least 43 near Huancayo. After burying the village of Mayunmarca, the landslide dammed the river and formed a lake that would reach a depth of 107 metres (351 ft) and a length of 31 kilometres (19 mi) after submerging the towns of Pururo and La Esmeralda, as well as numerous large farms.
- The value of the Canadian dollar reached its highest point ever on exchange markets, becoming worth slightly more than $1.04 in United States dollars (US$1.0443); the U.S. dollar was worth slightly less than 96 cents (C$0.95758). The value of the Canadian dollar would reach its low point on January 21, 2002, worth US$0.6179 but would briefly surpass the U.S. dollar again on September 28, 2007.
- National Football League owners voted to make nine changes to NFL rules, including sudden-death overtime for regular season games tied at the end of regulation, moving the goal posts, returning missed field goals to the line of scrimmage, after the new World Football League (WFL) had announced that it would have similar rules. One WFL owner told reporters, "It looks like they went right down the line and copied our book."
- Born:
  - Grant Achatz, American chef and restaurateur; in St. Clair, Michigan
  - Ivonne Montero, Mexican television actress, star of the telenovela ¡Anita, no te rajes!; in Mexico City
- Died: Pamela Courson, 27, former companion of singer Jim Morrison and heir to his fortune, was found dead of a heroin overdose, less than three years after his death.

== April 26, 1974 (Friday) ==
- By a vote of 247 to 233, the lower house of West Germany's parliament, the Bundestag, narrowly passed a law allowing abortion of a pregnancy in the first trimester. The bill repealed paragraph 218 of the 1871 German penal code. The nation's supreme court suspended the law on June 21, and would strike it down as unconstitutional on February 25, 1975.
- In Addis Ababa, Ethiopia's Army arrested more than 200 high-ranking government ministers and military officers on charges of corruption. The former government ministers had resigned on the day after an attempted coup d'état on February 25 but had been blocked from leaving the capital.
- The day after the overthrow of Portugal's Premier Marcelo Caetano, the seven-member Junta de Salvação Nacional, chaired by General Spinola, announced that it would govern Portugal until further notice, but that it would restore democracy and bring an end to Portugal's colonial rule of Mozambique, Angola and other colonies. The first act of the Junta was to announce amnesty for all political prisoners (except for those with prior criminal records) jailed during the Estado Novo regime; 172 were released on the same day, including Hermínio da Palma Inácio and 76 others imprisoned at the Fortress of Caxias outside of Lisbon.

== April 27, 1974 (Saturday) ==
- All 109 passengers and crew on an Aeroflot flight were killed in the Soviet Union, shortly after the Ilyushin Il-18 turboprop took off from Leningrad to Zaporozhye. In accordance with practice at the time, the Soviet news media made no mention of the crash. According to a Western source, "The crash could be clearly seen from the airport and pandemonium broke out in the terminal with relatives and friends of the passengers screaming and crying."
- The Anglo-Australian Telescope (AAT), a 390-centimetre (150 in) optical telescope, located at the Siding Spring Observatory on Mount Woorat in New South Wales, was first used.
- The shelling of an Israeli fortress in the Golan Heights by Syrian artillery led to the deaths of 14 IDF soldiers in the Bashan salient, former Syrian territory conquered by the Israeli Army in the 1973 war. Eight IDF soldiers were killed when a shell hit their fortress, while six more died in the crash of a helicopter that was on its way to rescue the survivors. Israel retaliated with airstrikes of Syrian army camps. The battle marked the last major fighting in the "War of Attrition" that lasted for three months before a disengagement agreement signed between the two nations on May 31.
- Died: U.S. Navy Admiral Jesse B. Oldendorf, 87, known for his command in the 1944 Battle of Leyte Gulf

== April 28, 1974 (Sunday) ==
- Mário Soares, the exiled leader of Portugal's banned Socialist Party, returned to Lisbon by train after years of living in Paris, and was greeted by 4,000 people. He would become Prime Minister of Portugal in 1976, serving twice (1976–1978 and 1983–1985) and President from 1986 to 1996.
- The short-lived Bangsamoro Republik was proclaimed by the Moro National Liberation Front (MNLF) and its chairman, Nur Misuari, at Talipao on Jolo Island in the Philippines.
- The Women's FA Cup, championship of the Women's Football Association in England was played at Bedford and was won, 2 to 1, by Fodens Ladies F.C., over Southampton Women's F.C., on the second of two goals by Alison Leatherbarrow before 800 people.
- The U.S. television series The F.B.I., starring Efrem Zimbalist Jr., broadcast its 241st and final original episode after nine seasons on the ABC network.
- Born: Penélope Cruz, Spanish film actress, 2008 winner of the Academy Award for Best Supporting Actress in Vicky Cristina Barcelona; in Alcobendas
- Died: Yu Chin-san, 68, South Korean politician and leader of the opposition New Democratic Party, died of cancer.

== April 29, 1974 (Monday) ==
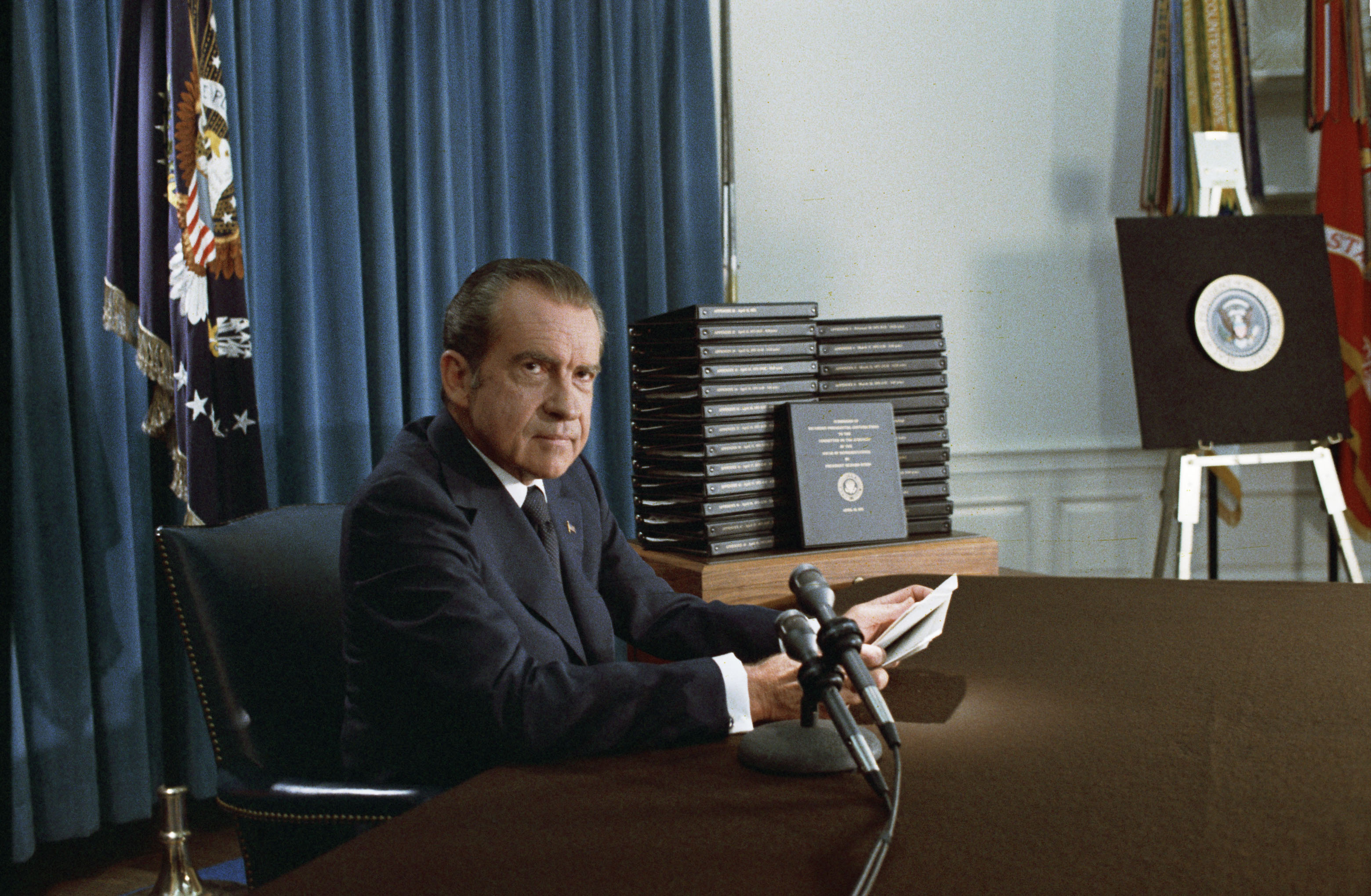
Nixon announcing that he will release transcripts

- In a nationally televised speech, U.S. President Nixon announced that, instead of releasing tape recordings, requested by the House Judiciary Committee, of key conversations, he had instead arranged to have some of them, but not all, transcribed by his staff. The transcripts began with a recording taken on September 15, 1972, and did not include the June 23, 1972 tape that would ultimately show that Nixon had ordered the halting of further FBI investigation into the burglary. The edited 1,200 pages of transcripts were known for using the phrase "expletive deleted" in place of profanities used during the conversations by the President and his staff. In lieu of presenting the tapes, Nixon said that the leaders of the Judiciary panel would be invited to come to the White House to listen to recordings.
- Argentine terrorists released U.S. oil executive Victor Samuelson following five months of captivity, after Esso Argentina, a subsidiary of the Exxon Corporation, had paid a record ransom of $14,200,000 on March 11 to guerrillas of the People's Revolutionary Army (ERP). Samuelson, who had been kidnapped on December 6 from a dining room at the company's refinery where he had been the manager, dropped Samuelson off at the home of the family's pediatrician, Dr. Federico Pfister, in the town of Acasusso, outside of Buenos Aires.
- Born: Anggun Cipta Sasmi, Indonesian-born French singer and TV personality, known for her best-selling song "Snow on the Sahara"; in Jakarta

== April 30, 1974 (Tuesday) ==
- In West Germany, nine construction workers were killed and 11 seriously injured in the collapse of a new overpass, being constructed over an autobahn between Kempten and Ulm in Bavaria.
- The last of the Phase III wage and price controls implemented by U.S. President Nixon came to an end with the expiration of the statutory authority, after failing to stop the increase of inflation.
- Luis Acevedo Andrade, the General Secretary of the Communist Party of Chile and former mayor of the Chilean town of Coelemu, was arrested by Coelemu police and then transferred to the custody of the police in the larger city of Concepción. Acevedo would never be seen in public again, becoming one of the "desaparecidos" during the rule of dictator Augusto Pinochet.

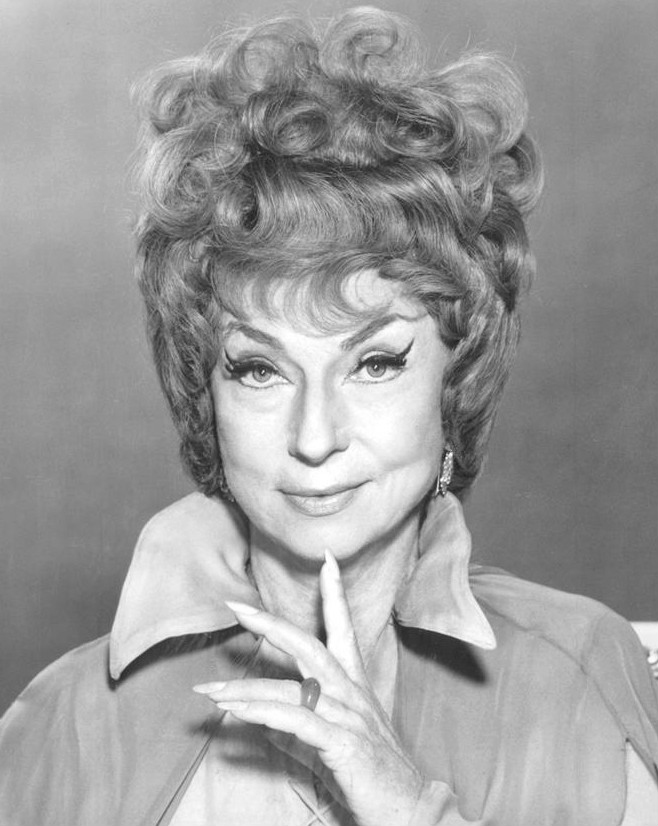
Moorehead in 1969 as Endora

- Died:
  - Agnes Moorehead, 73, American stage, film and TV actress best known as "Endora" on the popular TV series Bewitched, died of uterine cancer.
  - Pál Szécsi, 30, Hungarian popular music singer, committed suicide.
