= T. B. Tennekoon =

Sinhalese politician (1912–1980)

Hon. Tikiri Banda Tennekoon

Minister of Social Services
- In office May 1970 – 1971
- Preceded by: Asoka Karunaratne
- Succeeded by: Semage Salman Kulatileke

Minister of Cultural Affairs
- In office 1971–1977
- Preceded by: Semage Salman Kulatileke
- Succeeded by: E. L. B. Hurulle

Member of the Ceylon Parliament for Dambulla
- In office 1956–1977
- Preceded by: H. B. Tenne
- Succeeded by: K. W. R. M. Ekanayake

Personal details
- Born: 12 March 1912 Pathadumbara, Ceylon
- Died: 22 May 1980 (aged 67)
- Party: Sri Lanka Freedom Party
- Relations: L. M. Tennekoon (father)
- Children: Janka Bandara
- Education: Gunnepana Vidyalaya, Pushpadana Vidyalaya
- Occupation: printer, politician

Tikiri Banda Tennekoon (12 March 1912 – 22 May 1980) was a Sinhalese politician. He served as a member of Parliament, representing the Dambulla electorate for five consecutive terms (1956–1977).

Tikiri Banda Tennekoon was born 12 March 1912 in the village of Pathadumbara. His father, L. M. Tennekoon, was a popular local poet who practised indigenous medicine and astrology. Tennekoon received his education at the Gunnepana Vidyalaya, before the death of parents. He joined the Railway Department before taking a job at the Printing Press, 'Sirisara', in Kandy. In 1934, he started his own printing press, writing poems and verses, and publishing short poetry books, such as Ruwanweli Maha Sea Varnanaya (Narration of Ruwanweli Maha Seya), Sri Gouthama Vama Dalada Vandanava (Pilgrimage of Sri Gouthama left tooth Relic), Ruwanveli Vandanava (Ruwanweli Pilgrimage) and Vessanthara Sinduwa (Vessanthara Songs).

He was elected to the Kandy Municipal Council in 1946, representing the Deiyannewela Ward.

In 1956 Tennekoon contested the seat of Dambulla at the 3rd parliamentary election, held between 5 and 10 April, representing the Mahajana Eksath Peramuna (People's United Front). He polled 14,688 votes (71.4% of the total vote), defeating the sitting member and United National Party candidate, H. B. Tenne, by 9,155 votes. He sat as a backbencher on the Government side until June 1959 when he was appointed, by Prime Minister S. W. R. D. Bandaranaike, as the Parliamentary Secretary to the Minister of Cultural Affairs and Social Services.

Tennekoon retained the Dambulla seat at both the March and July 1960 general elections, winning by 6,840 votes and 6,316 votes, respectively. He was subsequently appointed Parliamentary Secretary to the Minister of Transport and Works in the Sirimavo Bandaranaike cabinet. In 1963 when he was appointed, Parliamentary Secretary to the Minister of Education & Cultural Affairs in the Sirimavo Bandaranaike cabinet first re-shuffle.

At the 6th parliamentary election, held on 22 March 1965, Teenekoon received 12,482 votes (51.4% of the total vote) defeating his United National Party rival by 1,174 votes. For the next five years he sat on the opposition benches.

In 1970 at the 7th parliamentary election, held on 27 May, he was successful again, polling 17,010 votes (56.2% of the total vote). Tennekoon was given the portfolio of Minister of Social Services and subsequently appointed the Minister of Cultural Affairs in the Second Sirimavo Bandaranaike cabinet. He was a major contributor to the development of Dambulla, where he inaugurated a special Economic Centre.

He was unable to win the seat a sixth successive time at the 8th parliamentary election, held on 21 July 1977, where he was defeated by the United National Party candidate, K. W. R. M. Ekanayake, 24,793 votes to Tennekoon's 15,964 votes.
