= Ossie Abeygunasekera =

Member of Parliament

Hon. Ossie Abeyagoonasekera
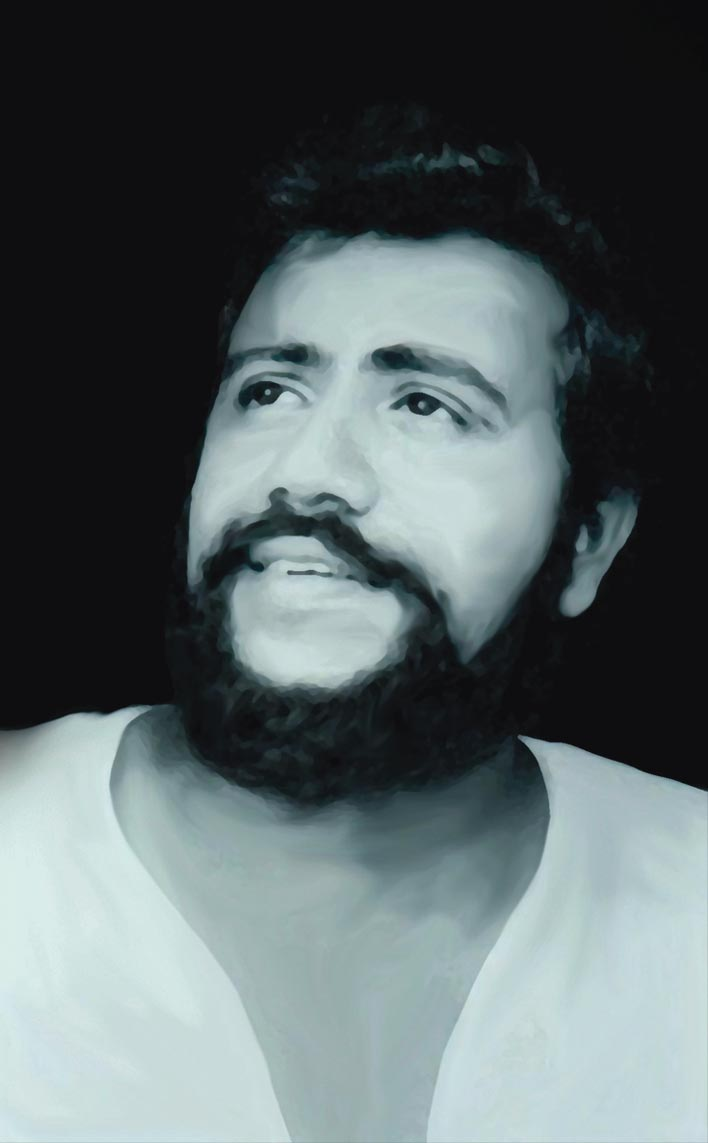

Member of Parliament for Colombo District
- In office 25 August 1994 – 24 October 1994

Personal details
- Born: 7 August 1950
- Died: 24 October 1994 (aged 44) Thotalanga, Grandpass, Sri Lanka
- Party: Sri Lanka Mahajana Pakshaya
- Other political affiliations: United National Party
- Education: Ananda College

Ahangama Withanage Oswin Nandimithra Abeyagoonasekera (known as Ossie Abeygunasekera; 7 August 1950 – 24 October 1994) was a member of Parliament and chairman and the leader of the Sri Lanka Mahajana Pakshaya or Party. He was assassinated by a female suicide bomber of the Liberation Tigers of Tamil Eelam (LTTE) while attending an election rally in support of Gamini Dissanayake, for the presidential election of 1994. The October 24, 1994 suicide bombing that killed Ossie Abeyagoonasekera and 57 others was one of the highest-casualty suicide attacks using a jacket bomb by a single individual in Sri Lankan history. He was an alumnus of Ananda College, St. Benedict's College, Colombo.

He was arrested as a Naxalite prisoner in 1982 along with Vijaya Kumaratunga for printing the "Rice ration book". In 1986, he negotiated with the LTTE for a peaceful solution of the ethnic conflict and for the release of the Sri Lankan soldiers who were captured. After the death of his close friend Vijaya Kumaratunga, founder of the Sri Lanka Mahajana Party, he became the party's leader in 1988 until his death in 1994. He contested the presidential election in 1989, creating the United Socialist Alliance (USA). During the 1989 youth insurrection in Sri Lanka, there were several failed assassination attempts on his life. His political party lost the most members, 114 lives, during the insurrection. He was an excellent orator and a visionary political leader. In 1994 he was elected to parliament under the United National Party ticket.

Ossie Abeyagunasekera's father, A. W. A. Abeyagunasekera, was also a politician, member of the Colombo Municipal Council and the chairman of Sri Lanka Ports Authority. A.W.A. Abeyagunasekera was defeated in Kelaniya by R. S. Perera in the 1960s. A. W. A. Abeyagunasekera died in the Air India Flight 855 crash in Mumbai.

Ossie Abeyagunasekera was married with one child, Asanga Abeyagoonasekera, who was the founding director general of the Institute of National Security Studies Sri Lanka.

== See also ==
- Vijaya Kumaranatunga
- List of members of the Sri Lankan Parliament who died in office
