= Weekend (Ceylonese newspaper) =

Sri Lankan English language weekly newspaper

- Type: Weekly newspaper
- Owner: Independent Newspapers Limited
- Founded: 1965
- Language: English
- City: Colombo
- Country: Ceylon
- Sister newspapers: Chinthamini; Dawasa; Dinapathi; Gitanjali; Iranama; Rasakatha; Riviresa; Sawasa; Star; Sun; Sundari; Thanthi; Tikiri; Visitura
- OCLC number: 9232882

Weekend was an English language weekly newspaper in Ceylon published by Independent Newspapers Limited, part of M. D. Gunasena & Company. It was founded in 1965 as the Weekend Sun and was published from Colombo. In 1966 it had an average net sales of 45,000. It had an average circulation of 48,590 in 1973. The paper later changed its name to Weekend.

By 1973/74 the Independent Newspapers publications had become vocal critics of Sirimavo Bandaranaike's government. The government sealed Independent Newspapers' presses and closed it down on 19 April 1974 using the Emergency (Defence) Regulations. Independent Newspapers resumed publication on 30 March 1977 but the three-year closure had taken its toll. Faced financial problems Independent Newspapers and its various publications closed down on 26 December 1990.
