= Hemachandra (name) =

Hemachandra is both a given name and a surname. Notable people with the name include:

== Given name ==
- Hemachandra (c. 1088–1173), Indian twelfth-century Jain scholar, poet, writer, mathematician, and polymath
- Hemachandra (singer) (born 1988), Indian singer
- Hemachandra Sirisena (1914–?), Ceylonese entrepreneur and politician
- Hemchandra Vikramaditya (c. 1501–1556), Indian king, wazir and general
- Dandeniya Hemachandra de Silva (1932–2014), Sri Lankan cricketer
- W. K. Hemachandra Wegapitiya, Sri Lankan entrepreneur

== Surname ==
- Arun Hemachandra, Sri Lankan politician
- Kalyanaratne Hemachandra (died 1962), Ceylonese politician, planter and mearchant
- Leathe Colvert Hemachandra (1900–1953), American educator
- Lakmali Hemachandra, Sri Lankan politician
