= Iranama =

Sri Lankan Sinhala language newspaper

- Type: Weekly newspaper
- Owner: Independent Newspapers Limited
- Founded: 1964
- Language: Sinhala
- City: Colombo
- Country: Ceylon
- Sister newspapers: Chinthamini; Dawasa; Dinapathi; Gitanjali; Rasakatha; Riviresa; Sawasa; Star; Sun; Sundari; Thanthi; Tikiri; Visitura; Weekend

Iranama was a Sinhala language weekly newspaper in Ceylon published by Independent Newspapers Limited, part of M. D. Gunasena & Company. It was founded on 1964 and was published from Colombo. In 1966 it had an average net sales of 20,000. It had an average circulation of 40,000 in 1973.

By 1973/74 the Independent Newspapers publications had become vocal critics of Sirimavo Bandaranaike's government. The government sealed Independent Newspapers' presses and closed it down on 19 April 1974 using the Emergency (Defence) Regulations. Independent Newspapers resumed publication on 30 March 1977 but the three-year closure had taken its toll. Faced financial problems Independent Newspapers and its various publications closed down on 26 December 1990.
