= Kolonna Electoral District =

Sri Lankan electoral district

Kolonna electoral district was an electoral district of Sri Lanka between March 1960 and February 1989. The district was named after the town of Kolonna in Ratnapura District, Sabaragamuwa Province. The 1978 Constitution of Sri Lanka introduced the proportional representation electoral system for electing members of Parliament. The existing 160 mainly single-member electoral districts were replaced with 22 multi-member electoral districts. Kolonna electoral district was replaced by the Ratnapura multi-member electoral district at the 1989 general elections.

== Members of Parliament ==
Key

Independent SLFP UNP

Election	Member	Party	Term
1960 (March)	Cyril Mathew	United National Party	1960
1960 (July)	Cyril Mathew	United National Party	1960 - 1965
1960 (July)	Nanda Mathew	United National Party	1965 - 1970
1970	P. O. Wimalanaga	Sri Lanka Freedom Party	1970 - 1977
1977	Nanda Mathew	United National Party	1977 - 1989

== Elections ==
=== 1960 (March) Parliamentary General Election ===
Results of the 4th parliamentary election held on 19 March 1960:

Candidate	Party	Symbol	Votes	%
Cyril Mathew	United National Party	Elephant	3,420	31.86
W. Siripala Nawagamuwa	Mahajana Eksath Peramuna	Cartwheel	2,405	22.40
S. D. Wanigatilake		Sun	2,089	19.46
Senarath Jayatunga		Key	1,515	14.11
K. G. Rupasena		Eye	785	7.31
Daniel Weerasena		Umbrella	383	3.57
Valid Votes			10,597	98.71
Rejected Votes			139	1.29
Total Polled			10,736	100.00
Registered Electors			15,234	
Turnout				70.47

=== 1960 (July) Parliamentary General Election ===
Results of the 5th parliamentary election held on 20 July 1960:

Candidate	Party	Symbol	Votes	%
Cyril Mathew	United National Party	Elephant	4,257	39.98
S. D. Wanigathillaka		Key	4,209	39.53
D. J. R. Dissanayaka		Bell	1,969	18.49
W. S. Nawagamuwa	Sri Lanka Freedom Party	Cartwheel	135	1.27
Valid Votes			10,570	99.26
Rejected Votes			79	0.74
Total Polled			10,649	100.00
Registered Electors			15,234	
Turnout				69.90

=== 1965 Parliamentary General Election ===
Results of the 6th parliamentary election held on 22 March 1965:

Candidate	Party	Symbol	Votes	%
Nanda Mathew	United National Party	Elephant	7,119	
Ananda Sirisena		Key	6,033	
D. J. R. Dissanayake		Lamp	3,619	
S. Don Wanigatilaka		Cart Wheel	644	
Valid Votes				
Rejected Votes			99	
Total Polled			17,514	100.00
Registered Electors			21,968	
Turnout				

=== 1970 Parliamentary General Election ===
Results of the 7th parliamentary election held on 27 May 1970:

Candidate	Party	Symbol	Votes	%
P. O. Wimalanaga	Sri Lanka Freedom Party	Key	16,886	
Nanda Mathew		Elephant	9778	
S. D. Wanigatilleke		Lamp	454	
Valid Votes			'	
Rejected Votes			136	
Total Polled			27,254	
Registered Electors			33,118	
Turnout				

=== 1977 Parliamentary General Election ===
Results of the 8th parliamentary election held on 21 July 1977:

Candidate	Party	Symbol	Votes	%
Nanda Mathew	United National Party	Elephant	20,378	
D. J. R. Dissanayake	Sri Lanka Freedom Party	Hand	12,903	
P. O. Wimalanaga		Key	1,339	
W. A. Seni Wijesinghe		Lamp	500	
Valid Votes			35,369	
Rejected Votes			106	0.29
Total Polled			35,475	
Registered Electors			43,367	
Turnout				
