= Nanda Mathew =

Sri Lankan politician (1940–2020)

Caluadewagey Nanda Mathew (2 February 1940 – 2020) was a Sri Lankan politician. He was the Governor of Uva Province, Minister of Sports and a Member of Parliament.

== Early life and education ==
Born on 2 February 1940, to Sinhala Nationalist Cyril Mathew, he was educated at the S. Thomas' College, Gurutalawa and S. Thomas' College, Mount Lavinia. He became a land owner and a planter.

== Political career ==
Mathew was elected to the House of Representatives of Ceylon in the 1965 general elections from Kolonna from the United National Party. He contested the 1970 general elections but was defeated by P.O. Wimalanaga. He elected from Kolonna in the 1977 general elections and was appointed Deputy Minister of Naval Services and Tourism, Rural Industry Development and Mahaweli Development by President J. R. Jayewardene. He was elected in the 1989 general elections from Ratnapura and was appointed Minister of Youth Affairs and Sports by President Ranasingha Premadasa. In 1994, he was given additional portfolios of Special Duties and Naval and Naval Development. He served as Governor of Uva Province from 2003 to 2015 having been appointed by President Chandrika Kumaratunga and President Mahinda Rajapaksa from the Sri Lanka Freedom Party.

== Personal life and death ==
Mathew married Indira Kulathilake, daughter of Semage Salman Kulatileke. They had one daughter, Nanditha Mathew. Nanda Mathew died in 2020.

== See also ==
- List of political families in Sri Lanka

Political offices
Preceded by Sirisena Amarasiri	Governor of Uva; 2003–2015	Succeeded by M. P. Jayasinghe
