= T. B. M. Herath =

Ceylonese politician (born 1933)

Herath Mudiyanselage Tilakaratna Banda (known as T. B. M. Herath) (born 15 August 1933) was a Ceylonese politician. He was the Deputy Minister of Transport in the Second Sirimavo Bandaranaike government and member of Parliament of Sri Lanka from Walapane representing the Sri Lanka Freedom Party. He was chairman of Oya Palata village council.
