= Ministry of Social Empowerment, Welfare and Kandyan Heritage =

Government ministry of Sri Lanka

Ministry overview
- Formed: 1947; 79 years ago
- Jurisdiction: Government of Sri Lanka
- Headquarters: 1st Floor, Sethsiripaya (Stage II), Battaramulla, Colombo; 6°54′10.10″N 79°54′57.40″E
- Annual budget: Rs. 14 billion (2017, recurrent); Rs. 2 billion (2017, capital)
- Minister responsible: Upali Pannilage, Minister of Social Empowerment, Welfare and Kandyan Heritage
- Deputy Minister responsible: L. G. Wasantha Piyatissa, Deputy Minister of Social Empowerment, Welfare and Kandyan Heritage
- Ministry executive: TBD, Secretary
- Child agencies: Department of Divineguma Development; Department of Social Services; National Council for Persons with Disabilities; National Institute of Social Development; National Secretariat for Elders and National Council for Elders; National Secretariat for Persons with Disabilities; Rural Development Training and Research Institute; Social Security Board
- Website: socialemwelfare.gov.lk

The Ministry of Social Empowerment, Welfare and Kandyan Heritage is the central government ministry of Sri Lanka responsible for social services, social welfare and Kandyan heritage. The ministry is responsible for formulating and implementing national policy on social empowerment and welfare and other subjects which come under its purview. The current Minister of Social Empowerment, Welfare and Kandyan Heritage and Deputy Minister of Social Empowerment, Welfare and Kandyan Heritage are S. B. Dissanayake and Ranjan Ramanayake respectively. The ministry's secretary is Mahinda Seneviratne.

== Ministers ==
The Minister of Social Empowerment, Welfare and Kandyan Heritage is a member of the Cabinet of Sri Lanka.

Parties

Ceylon National Congress United National Party Sri Lanka Freedom Party Mahajana Eksath Peramuna Sri Lanka Podujana Peramuna Eelam People's Democratic Party National People's Power

Ministers of Social Services
Name	Portrait	Party	Took office	Left office	Head of government	Ministerial title	Refs
T. B. Jayah			26 September 1947	1950	D. S. Senanayake	Minister of Labour and Social Services	
Kanthiah Vaithianathan			1953	1953	John Kotelawala	Minister of Housing and Social Services	
Kanthiah Vaithianathan			1953		John Kotelawala	Minister of Industries, Housing and Social Services	
T. B. Ilangaratne		Sri Lanka Freedom Party	12 April 1956		S. W. R. D. Bandaranaike	Minister of Labour, Housing and Social Services	
P. B. G. Kalugalla		Sri Lanka Freedom Party	9 June 1959		S. W. R. D. Bandaranaike	Minister of Cultural Affairs and Social Services	
P. B. G. Kalugalla		Sri Lanka Freedom Party		8 December 1959	W. Dahanayake	Minister of Cultural Affairs and Social Services	
M. V. P. Peiris			23 March 1960	1960	Dudley Senanayake	Minister of Health and Social Services	
D. S. Goonesekera		Sri Lanka Freedom Party	28 May 1963		Sirimavo Bandaranaike	Minister of Labour and Social Services	
Asoka Karunaratne		United National Party			Dudley Senanayake	Minister of Social Services	
S. S. Kulatileke					Sirimavo Bandaranaike	Minister of Social Services	
Asoka Karunaratne		United National Party	23 July 1977		J. R. Jayewardene	Minister of Social Services	
Ranjit Atapattu		United National Party	18 February 1989	5 January 1990	Ranasinghe Premadasa	Minister of Labour and Social Welfare	
D. B. Wijetunga		United National Party	11 January 1990		Ranasinghe Premadasa	Minister of Labour and Social Welfare	
A. M. S. Adhikari		United National Party	30 March 1990	14 March 1991	Ranasinghe Premadasa	Minister of Reconstruction, Rehabilitation and Social Welfare	
P. Dayaratna		United National Party	14 March 1991		Ranasinghe Premadasa	Minister of Reconstruction, Rehabilitation and Social Welfare	
A. H. M. Fowzie		Sri Lanka Freedom Party	19 August 1994		D. B. Wijetunga	Minister of Health and Social Services	
Milroy Fernando		Sri Lanka Freedom Party	19 October 2000		Chandrika Kumaratunga	Minister of Social Services and Fishing Community Housing Development	
Nimal Siripala de Silva		Sri Lanka Freedom Party	14 September 2001		Chandrika Kumaratunga	Minister of Health, Indigenous Medicine and Social Services	
Sumedha G. Jayasena		Sri Lanka Freedom Party	10 April 2004		Chandrika Kumaratunga	Minister of Women's Empowerment and Social Welfare	
Douglas Devananda		Eelam People's Democratic Party	23 November 2005		Mahinda Rajapaksa	Minister of Social Services and Social Welfare	
Felix Perera		Sri Lanka Freedom Party	23 April 2010		Mahinda Rajapaksa	Minister of Social Services	
P. Harrison		United National Party	12 January 2015	17 August 2015	Maithripala Sirisena	Minister of Social Services, Welfare and Livestock Development	
S. B. Dissanayake		Sri Lanka Freedom Party	4 September 2015	22 May 2017	Maithripala Sirisena	Minister of Social Empowerment and Welfare	
S. B. Dissanayake		Sri Lanka Freedom Party	22 May 2017	12 April 2018	Maithripala Sirisena	Minister of Social Empowerment, Welfare and Kandyan Heritage	
Daya Gamage		United National Party	20 December 2018	21 November 2019	Maithripala Sirisena	Minister of Labour, Trade Union Relations and Social Empowerment	
Mahinda Rajapaksa		Sri Lanka Podujana Peramuna	1 June 2020	9 May 2022	Gotabaya Rajapaksa	Minister of Community Empowerment and Estate Infrastructure Development	
Ranil Wickremesinghe		United National Party	21 July 2022	23 September 2024	Ranil Wickremesinghe	Minister of Women, Child Affairs and Social Empowerment	
Anura Kumara Dissanayake		National People's Power	24 September 2024	18 November 2024	Anura Kumara Dissanayake	Minister of Rural Development, Social Security and Community Empowerment	
Upali Pannilage		National People's Power	18 November 2024	Incumbent	Anura Kumara Dissanayake	Minister of Rural Development, Social Security and Community Empowerment	

== Secretaries ==
Social Services Secretaries
Name	Took office	Left office	Title	Refs
W. Yamuna Chitrangani	25 April 2010		Social Services Secretary	
D. K. R. Ekanayake	19 January 2015		Social Services, Welfare and Livestock Secretary	
Mahinda Seneviratne	8 September 2015		Social Empowerment and Social Services Secretary	
