= Dambulla Electoral District =

Former electoral district of Sri Lanka

Dambulla electoral district was an electoral district of Sri Lanka between August 1947 and February 1989. The district was named after the town of Dambulla in Matale District, Central Province. The 1978 Constitution of Sri Lanka introduced the proportional representation electoral system for electing members of Parliament. The existing 160 mainly single-member electoral districts were replaced with 22 multi-member electoral districts. Dambulla electoral district was replaced by the Matale multi-member electoral district at the 1989 general elections, the first under the PR system, though Dambulla continues to be a polling division of the multi-member electoral district.

== Members of Parliament ==
Key

Independent SLFP UNP

Election	Member	Party	Term
1947	H. B. Tenne	Independent	1947-1956
1952	H. B. Tenne	Independent	1947-1956
1956	Tikiri Banda Tennekoon	Sri Lanka Freedom Party	1956-1977
1960 (March)	Tikiri Banda Tennekoon	Sri Lanka Freedom Party	1956-1977
1960 (July)	Tikiri Banda Tennekoon	Sri Lanka Freedom Party	1956-1977
1965	Tikiri Banda Tennekoon	Sri Lanka Freedom Party	1956-1977
1970	Tikiri Banda Tennekoon	Sri Lanka Freedom Party	1956-1977
1977	K. W. R. M. Ekanayake	United National Party	1977-1989

== Elections ==
=== 1947 Parliamentary General Election ===
Results of the 1st parliamentary election held between 23 August 1947 and 20 September 1947:

Candidate	Party	Symbol	Votes	%
H. B. Tenne	Independent	Elephant	6,846	57.46
Edward de Silva	Communist Party of Sri Lanka	Star	3,909	32.81
A. G. G. Perera	Lanka Equal Society Party	Key	861	7.23
Valid Votes			11,616	97.50
Rejected Votes			298	2.50
Total Polled			11,914	100.00
Registered Electors			26,388	
Turnout				45.15

=== 1952 Parliamentary General Election ===
Results of the 2nd parliamentary election held between 24 May 1952 and 30 May 1952:

Candidate	Party	Symbol	Votes	%
H. B. Tenne	Sri Lanka Freedom Party	Eye	8,294	54.02
D. B. Ellepola		Hand	3,442	22.42
P. B. Ranaraja		Elephant	2,897	18.87
T. B. Wegodapola	Communist Party of Sri Lanka	Star	409	2.66
Valid Votes			15,042	97.97
Rejected Votes			312	2.03
Total Polled			15,354	100.00
Registered Electors			30,193	
Turnout				50.85

=== 1956 Parliamentary General Election ===
Results of the 3rd parliamentary election held between 5 April 1956 and 10 April 1956:

Candidate	Party	Symbol	Votes	%
Tikiri Banda Tennekoon	Sri Lanka Freedom Party	Hand	14,688	71.36
H. B. Tenne	United National Party	Elephant	5,533	26.88
Valid Votes			20,221	98.24
Rejected Votes			363	1.76
Total Polled			20,584	100.00
Registered Electors			37,345	
Turnout				55.12

=== 1960 (March) Parliamentary General Election ===
Results of the 4th parliamentary election held on 19 March 1960:

Candidate	Party	Symbol	Votes	%
Tikiri Banda Tennekoon	Sri Lanka Freedom Party	Hand	10,792	62.28
D. B. Ellepola	United National Party	Elephant	3,952	22.81
P. V. P. Kulatilleke	Lanka Equal Society Party	Key	722	4.17
L. D. Banda		Lamp	527	3.04
Leslie Kulatunga		Cockerel	302	1.74
T. M. Varusavithana		Umbrella	296	1.71
H. Ariyasena		Eye	231	1.33
G. D. Ranaweera		Sun	228	1.32
Upali Kulatunga	Mahajana Eksath Peramuna	Cart Wheel	105	0.61
Valid Votes			17,155	99.00
Rejected Votes			173	1.00
Total Polled			17,328	100.00
Registered Electors			21,416	
Turnout				80.91

=== 1960 (July) Parliamentary General Election ===
Results of the 5th parliamentary election held on 20 July 1960:

Candidate	Party	Symbol	Votes	%
Tikiri Banda Tennekoon	Sri Lanka Freedom Party	Hand	11,600	68.14
T. B. Lenadora	United National Party	Elephant	5,284	31.04
Valid Votes			16,884	99.18
Rejected Votes			140	0.82
Total Polled			17,024	100.00
Registered Electors			21,416	
Turnout				79.49

=== 1965 Parliamentary General Election ===
Results of the 6th parliamentary election held on 22 March 1965:

Candidate	Party	Symbol	Votes	%
Tikiri Banda Tennekoon	Sri Lanka Freedom Party	Hand	12,482	51.37
K. W. R. M. Ekanayake	United National Party	Elephant	11,308	46.54
R. K. Nimal Karunaratne		Sun	266	1.09
Valid Votes			24,056	99.00
Rejected Votes			242	1.00
Total Polled			24,298	100.00
Registered Electors			28,267	
Turnout				85.96

=== 1970 Parliamentary General Election ===
Results of the 7th parliamentary election held on 27 May 1970:

Candidate	Party	Symbol	Votes	%
Tikiri Banda Tennekoon	Sri Lanka Freedom Party	Hand	17,010	56.22
K. W. R. M. Ekanayake	United National Party	Elephant	13,123	43.37
Valid Votes			30,133	99.58
Rejected Votes			126	0.42
Total Polled			30,259	100.00
Registered Electors			33,503	
Turnout				90.32

=== 1977 Parliamentary General Election ===
Results of the 8th parliamentary election held on 21 July 1977 for the district:

Candidate	Party	Symbol	Votes	%
K. W. R. M. Ekanayake		Elephant	24,793	59.28
Tikiri Banda Tennekoon		Hand	15,964	38.17
D. S. Wijewardena		Key	745	1.78
T. B. Tennekoon		Lamp	183	0.44
Valid Votes			41,685	99.66
Rejected Votes			142	0.34
Total Polled			41,827	100.00
Registered Electors			46,052	
Turnout				90.83
