= Thanthi (Ceylon) =

Sri Lankan Tamil language newspaper

- Type: Daily newspaper
- Owner: Independent Newspapers Limited
- Founded: 1967
- Language: Tamil
- City: Colombo
- Country: Ceylon
- Sister newspapers: Chinthamini; Dinapathi; Dawasa; Gitanjali; Iranama; Rasakatha; Riviresa; Sawasa; Star; Sun; Sundari; Tikiri; Visitura; Weekend

Thanthi was a Tamil language daily evening newspaper in Ceylon published by Independent Newspapers Limited, part of M. D. Gunasena & Company. It was founded on 1967 and was published from Colombo. In 1967 it had an average net sales of 16,000. It had an average circulation of 10,020 in 1973.

By 1973/74 the Independent Newspapers publications had become vocal critics of Sirimavo Bandaranaike's government. The government sealed Independent Newspapers' presses and closed it down on 19 April 1974 using the Emergency (Defence) Regulations. Independent Newspapers resumed publication on 30 March 1977 but the three-year closure had taken its toll. Due to financial problems, Independent Newspapers and its various publications closed down on 26 December 1990.
