= Sundari (newspaper) =

Sri Lankan Tamil language newspaper

- Type: Weekly newspaper
- Owner: Independent Newspapers Limited
- Founded: 1973
- Language: Tamil
- City: Colombo
- Country: Sri Lanka
- Sister newspapers: Chinthamini; Dawasa; Dinapathi; Gitanjali; Iranama; Rasakatha; Riviresa; Sawasa; Star; Sun; Thanthi; Tikiri; Visitura; Weekend

Sundari was a Tamil language weekly newspaper in Sri Lanka published by Independent Newspapers Limited, part of M. D. Gunasena & Company. It was founded on 1973 and was published from Colombo. It had an average circulation of 1,000 in 1973.

By 1973/74 the Independent Newspapers publications had become vocal critics of Sirimavo Bandaranaike's government. The government sealed Independent Newspapers' presses and closed it down on 19 April 1974 using the Emergency (Defence) Regulations. Independent Newspapers resumed publication on 30 March 1977 but the three-year closure had taken its toll. Due to financial problems, Independent Newspapers and its various publications closed down on 26 December 1990.
