= Dinapathi =

Sri Lankan Tamil language newspaper

- Type: Daily newspaper
- Owner: Independent Newspapers Limited
- Founded: 1964
- Language: Tamil
- City: Colombo
- Country: Ceylon
- Sister newspapers: Chinthamini; Dawasa; Gitanjali; Iranama; Rasakatha; Riviresa; Sawasa; Star; Sun; Sundari; Thanthi; Tikiri; Visitura; Weekend

Dinapathi was a Tamil language daily newspaper in Ceylon published by Independent Newspapers Limited, part of M. D. Gunasena & Company. It was founded on 1964 and was published from Colombo. In 1966 it had an average net sales of 11,000. It had an average circulation of 12,100 in 1970 and 31,337 in 1973.

By 1973/74 the Independent Newspapers publications had become vocal critics of Sirimavo Bandaranaike's government. The government sealed Independent Newspapers' presses and closed it down on 19 April 1974 using the Emergency (Defence) Regulations. Independent Newspapers resumed publication on 30 March 1977 but the three-year closure had taken its toll. Due to financial problems, Independent Newspapers and its various publications closed down on 26 December 1990.
