= H. B. Tenne =

Ceylonese politician (born 1894)

Henry Bernard Tenne (born 11 August 1894) was a politician in British Ceylon and the later Dominion of Ceylon.

Tenne was elected as an independent member at the 1st parliamentary election, held between 23 August 1947 and 20 September 1947, representing the Dambulla electorate, securing 57.5% of the total vote.

He was re-elected to the seat of Dambulla at the 2nd parliamentary election, held in May 1952, representing the Sri Lanka Freedom Party (SLFP), with 54% of the total vote. Immediately prior to the 1956 parliamentary elections Tenne switched allegiance to the United National Party (UNP) and subsequently ran as the party's candidate in the Dambulla electorate, where he was defeated by the SLFP's candidate, T. B. Tennekoon, 14,688 votes to 5,533 votes.
