= Ministry of Cultural Affairs =

Ministry of Cultural Affairs can refer to:

- Ministry of Cultural Affairs (Albania)
- Ministry of Cultural Affairs (Bangladesh)
- Ministry of Cultural Affairs (Japan)
- Ministry of Cultural Affairs, Internal Affairs and Regional Development (Sri Lanka)

== See also ==
- Minister of culture
