= Kelaniya Electoral District =

Electoral district of Sri Lanka

Kelaniya electoral district was an electoral district of Sri Lanka between August 1947 and February 1989. The district was named after the town of Kelaniya in present-day Gampaha District, Western Province. The 1978 Constitution of Sri Lanka introduced the proportional representation electoral system for electing members of Parliament. The existing 160 mainly single-member electoral districts were replaced with 22 multi-member electoral districts. Kelaniya electoral district was replaced by the Gampaha multi-member electoral district at the 1989 general elections, the first under the PR system, though Kelaniya continues to be a polling division of the multi-member electoral district.

== Members of Parliament ==
Key

Independent SLFP UNP

Election	Member	Party	Term
1947	Junius Jayawardene	United National Party	1947-1952
1952	Junius Jayawardene	United National Party	1952-1956
1956	Richard Senanayake		1956-1960
1960	Junius Jayawardene	United National Party	1960-1960
1960	R. S. Perera	Sri Lanka Freedom Party	1960-1965
1965	R. S. Perera	Sri Lanka Freedom Party	1965-1970
1970	R. S. Perera	Sri Lanka Freedom Party	1970-1977
1977	Cyril Mathew	United National Party	1977-1989

== Elections ==
=== 1947 Parliamentary General Election ===
Results of the 1st parliamentary election held between 23 August 1947 and 20 September 1947 for the district:

Candidate	Party	Symbol	Votes	%
J. R. Jayewardene		Elephant	17,246	62.82%
B. Waidyasekera		Hand	10,206	37.18%
Valid Votes			27,452	100.00%
Rejected Votes			390	
Total Polled			27,842	
Registered Electors			47,638	
Turnout			58.44%	

=== 1952 Parliamentary General Election ===
Results of the 2nd parliamentary election held between 24 May 1952 and 30 May 1952 for the district:

Candidate	Party	Symbol	Votes	%
J. R. Jayewardene		Hand	22,103	50.81%
Vimala Wijewardene		Elephant	15,868	36.48%
Vivienne Goonewardena		House	4,857	11.17%
D. R. Jayamanna		Star	673	1.55%
Valid Votes			43,501	100.00%
Rejected Votes			434	
Total Polled			43,935	
Registered Electors			58,170	
Turnout			75.53%	

=== 1956 Parliamentary General Election ===
Results of the 3rd parliamentary election held between 5 April 1956 and 10 April 1956 for the district:

Candidate	Party	Symbol	Votes	%
R. G. Senanayake		Umbrella	37,023	71.55%
J. R. Jayewardene		Elephant	14,187	27.42%
M. P. P. W. Jayawardene		Lamp	377	0.73%
S. A. D. S. Gunawardena		Cart Wheel	158	0.31%
Valid Votes			57,145	100.00%
Rejected Votes			325	
Total Polled			52,070	
Registered Electors			67,542	
Turnout			77.09%	

=== 1960 (March) Parliamentary General Election ===
Results of the 4th parliamentary election held on 19 March 1960 for the district:

Candidate	Party	Symbol	Votes	%
J. R. Jayewardene	United National Party	Elephant	10,827	37.54%
R. S. Perera	Sri Lanka Freedom Party	Hand	9,318	32.31%
D. C. P. Benaragama	Mahajana Eksath Peramuna	Cart Wheel	6,454	22.38%
N. S. Perera		Key	1,769	6.13%
D. V. Algama		Pair of Scales	284	0.98%
H. H. P. Saratha Kumar		Lamp	187	0.65%
Valid Votes			28,839	100.00%
Rejected Votes			124	
Total Polled			28,963	
Registered Electors			35,470	
Turnout			81.65%	

=== 1960 (July) Parliamentary General Election ===
Results of the 5th parliamentary election held on 20 July 1960 for the district:

Candidate	Party	Symbol	Votes	%
R. S. Perera	Sri Lanka Freedom Party	Hand	15,801	56.34%
A. W. A. Abeyagoonasekera	United National Party	Elephant	11,353	40.48%
C. Amarasinha		Cart Wheel	894	3.19%
Valid Votes			28,048	100.00%
Rejected Votes			109	
Total Polled			28,157	
Registered Electors			35,470	
Turnout			79.38%	

=== 1965 Parliamentary General Election ===
Results of the 6th parliamentary election held on 22 March 1965 for the district:

Candidate	Party	Symbol	Votes	%
R. S. Perera	Sri Lanka Freedom Party	Hand	20,147	51.78%
A. W. A. Abeyagoonasekera	United National Party	Elephant	18,268	46.95%
Saranapala Gunawadena	Mahajana Eksath Peramuna	Cart Wheel	495	1.27%
Valid Votes			38,910	100.00%
Rejected Votes			191	
Total Polled			39,101	
Registered Electors			46,330	
Turnout			84.40%	

=== 1970 Parliamentary General Election ===
Results of the 7th parliamentary election held on 27 May 1970 for the district:

Candidate	Party	Symbol	Votes	%
R. S. Perera	Sri Lanka Freedom Party	Hand	29,331	57.89%
A. W. A. Abeyagoonasekera	United National Party	Elephant	20,992	41.43%
M. D. H. de Silva		Bell	348	0.69%
Valid Votes			50,671	100.00%
Rejected Votes			178	
Total Polled			50,849	
Registered Electors			59,968	
Turnout			84.79%	

=== 1977 Parliamentary General Election ===
Results of the 8th parliamentary election held on 21 July 1977 for the district:

Candidate	Party	Symbol	Votes	%
Cyril Mathew		Elephant	23,477	56.08%
Erin Senanayake		Hand	16,958	40.51%
L. Wewala Panditha		Star	1,076	2.57%
H. A. Seneviratna		Bell	162	0.39%
R. H. Jayasekera		Cart Wheel	85	0.20%
M. D. H. de Silva		Chair	45	0.11%
V. Stephen Perera		Omni Bus	29	0.07%
Tissa Gerard Luwis		Lamp	29	0.07%
Valid Votes			41,861*	100.00%
Rejected Votes			71	
Total Polled			41,932	
Registered Electors			49,470	
Turnout			84.76%	
