= Sun (Ceylon) =

Sri Lankan English language newspaper

- Type: Daily newspaper
- Owner: Independent Newspapers Limited
- Founded: 1964
- Language: English
- City: Colombo
- Country: Ceylon
- Sister newspapers: Chinthamini; Dawasa; Dinapathi; Gitanjali; Iranama; Rasakatha; Riviresa; Sawasa; Star; Sundari; Thanthi; Tikiri; Visitura; Weekend
- OCLC number: 36532512

The Sun was an English language daily newspaper in Ceylon published by Independent Newspapers Limited, part of M. D. Gunasena & Company. It was founded on 1964 and was published from Colombo. In 1966 it had an average net sales of 18,000. It had an average circulation of 6,800 in 1970 and 32,247 in 1973.

By 1973/74 the Independent Newspapers publications had become vocal critics of Sirimavo Bandaranaike's government. The government sealed Independent Newspapers' presses and closed it down on 19 April 1974 using the Emergency (Defence) Regulations. Independent Newspapers resumed publication, in The Sun's case under a new editor, Rex de Silva, on 30 March 1977 but the three-year closure had taken its toll. Facing financial problems Independent Newspapers and its various publications closed down on 26 December 1990.

The Sun was also a training ground for many famous Sri Lankan journalists including Sinha Ratnatunga and Iqbal Athas.
