= Star (Ceylon) =

Sri Lankan English language newspaper

- Type: Daily newspaper
- Owner: Independent Newspapers Limited
- Founded: 1967
- Language: English
- City: Colombo
- Country: Ceylon
- Sister newspapers: Chinthamini; Dinapathi; Dawasa; Gitanjali; Iranama; Rasakatha; Riviresa; Sawasa; Sun; Sundari; Thanthi; Tikiri; Visitura; Weekend

The Star was an English language daily evening newspaper in Ceylon published by Independent Newspapers Limited, part of M. D. Gunasena & Company. It was founded on 1967 and was published from Colombo. In 1967 it had an average net sales of 4,000.
