= L. G. Wasantha Piyatissa =

Sri Lankan politician

Hon. L. G. Wasantha Piyatissa MP

Deputy Minister of Rural Development, Social Security and Community Empowerment

Member of Parliament for Ampara District
- Incumbent
- Assumed office 2024
- Majority: 71,120 preferential votes
- In office 2004–2010

Personal details
- Born: 7 October 1971 (age 54)
- Party: National People's Power (Since 2019)
- Other political affiliations: Janatha Vimukthi Peramuna (Since 2014); United People's Freedom Alliance (Until 2011)

L. G. Wasantha Piyatissa is a Sri Lankan politician who has served as the Deputy Minister of Rural Development, Social Security and Community Empowerment since 2024. He was formerly member of the Parliament of Sri Lanka from 2004 to 2010.
