= Hemachandra Sirisena =

Ceylonese entrepreneur and politician

Doolwala Galapitage Hemachandra Sirisena (born 3 January 1914) was a Ceylonese entrepreneur and politician. He served as Deputy Minister of Labour in the Second Sirimavo Bandaranaike cabinet. Having produced fireworks since 1927, Sirisena founded the Kandiyan Fireworks Company in 1935. He was first elected to the Parliament of Sri Lanka as first member for Akurana, Harispathuwa representing the Sri Lanka Freedom Party in the 1965 parliamentary election. He was elected the second member for the Akurana electoral district in the 1970 parliamentary election.
