= Upali Pannilage =

Sri Lankan politician

Upali Pannilage is a Sri Lankan politician currently serving as the Minister of Rural Development, Social Security and Community Empowerment. He was appointed as a Member of Parliament for National List in 2024 Sri Lankan parliamentary election as a member of the National People's Power.
