= 1974 Leningrad Ilyushin Il-18 crash =

1974 aviation accident in the Soviet Union

1974 Leningrad Aeroflot Il-18 crash
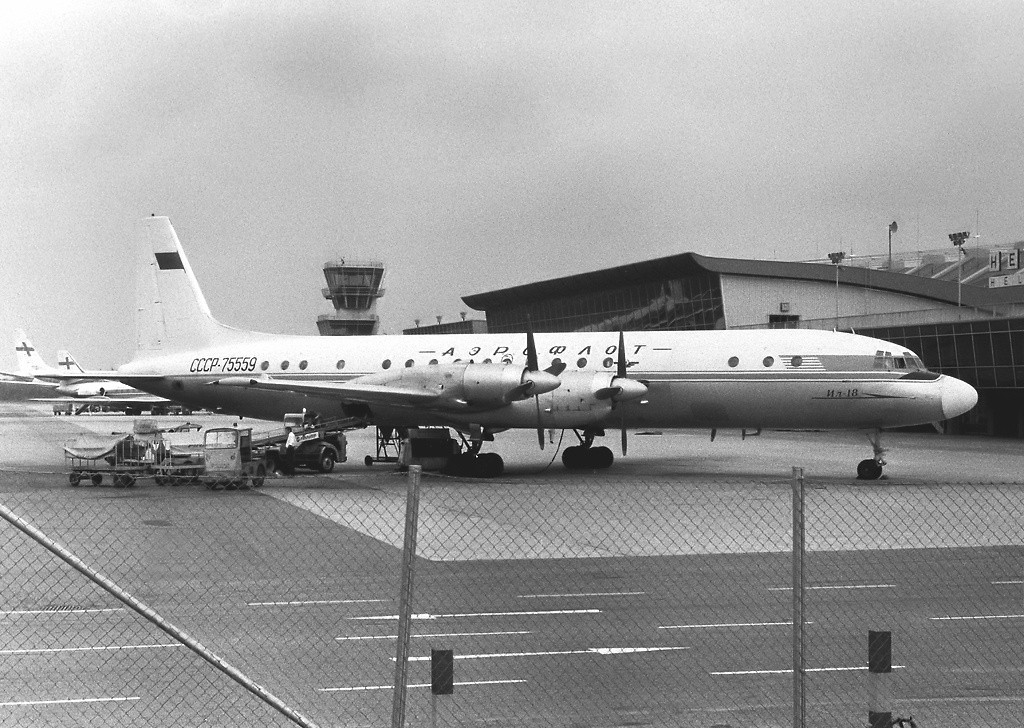
- CCCP-75559, the aircraft involved in the accident, photographed in 1972

Accident
- Date: 27 April 1974
- Summary: Uncontained engine failure, loss of control
- Site: Near Pulkovo Airport, Leningrad, Soviet Union; 59°48′06.1″N 30°20′27.6″E

Aircraft
- Aircraft type: Ilyushin Il-18V
- Operator: Aeroflot
- Registration: CCCP-75559
- Flight origin: Pulkovo Airport
- Stopover: Zaporizhzhia Airport
- Destination: Krasnodar Airport
- Passengers: 102
- Crew: 7
- Fatalities: 109
- Survivors: 0

On 27 April 1974, an Aeroflot Ilyushin Il-18, operating a scheduled passenger flight from Leningrad to Krasnodar via Zaporizhzhia, lost control and crashed after attempting to return to Pulkovo Airport following an engine fire killing all 102 passengers and 7 crew on board the flight.

== Background ==
=== Aircraft ===
The aircraft involved, manufactured in 1964, was a 10-year-old Ilyushin Il-18V registered as CCCP-75559 with serial number 184007703. It had accumulated 18,358 flying hours in 7,501 flights. It was powered by four Ivchenko AI-20K.

=== Passengers and crew ===
There were 102 passengers — 98 adults and 4 children, and 7 crew members. The Captain was Nikolai Danilov.

== Accident ==
The aircraft was operating a regular flight from Leningrad to Krasnodar via a stopover at Zaporizhzhia to refuel the aircraft. On the day of the accident, the weather was described as "spring-like", with light clouds and light winds present.

The flight took off from Pulkovo Airport at 18:00 MSK (UTC+03:00) without any problems. A few minutes later, Captain Nikolai Danilov told air traffic control (ATC) that the number 4 engine had caught fire, stating: "Engine four fire, dangerous vibration, turning around." Air traffic controllers suggested the crew land at Gorelovo air base but the crew instead decided to land at Pulkovo Airport and were cleared to land on the same runway. The crew then had to carry out four manoeuvres to attempt to land at the airport. Following the second manoeuvre, smoke from the burning engine became noticeable from the ground. The flight crew continuously transmitted by radio that they had serious problems and requested that fire trucks meet them at Pulkovo.

Five minutes later, the ATC proposed that the aircraft attempt a landing at a military airfield in Pushkin but the captain refused the proposal as fire brigades were already awaiting them at Pulkovo. After completing all four manoeuvres, the crew reduced the plane's speed to attempt an approach to the runway, however, this led to the fire gaining in intensity, destroying the right wing's mechanical functions. The last message transmitted by the flight – located 2.5 kilometres (1.6 mi) away from the airport – was: «Падаем, конец» ("We're falling, it's the end").

The aircraft subsequently rolled "abruptly" to the right in an inverted attitude, and at 18:07, just seven minutes after takeoff, the plane crashed near railroad tracks in the direction of Luga 1.5 kilometres (0.93 mi) away from the airport. The wreckage was scattered over 30 metres (98 ft).

== Aftermath ==
The crash was the ninth aviation accident to have involved Aeroflot in the previous 18 months. Soviet media did not talk about the accident.

== See also ==
- United Airlines Flight 232
