= Hermínio da Palma Inácio =

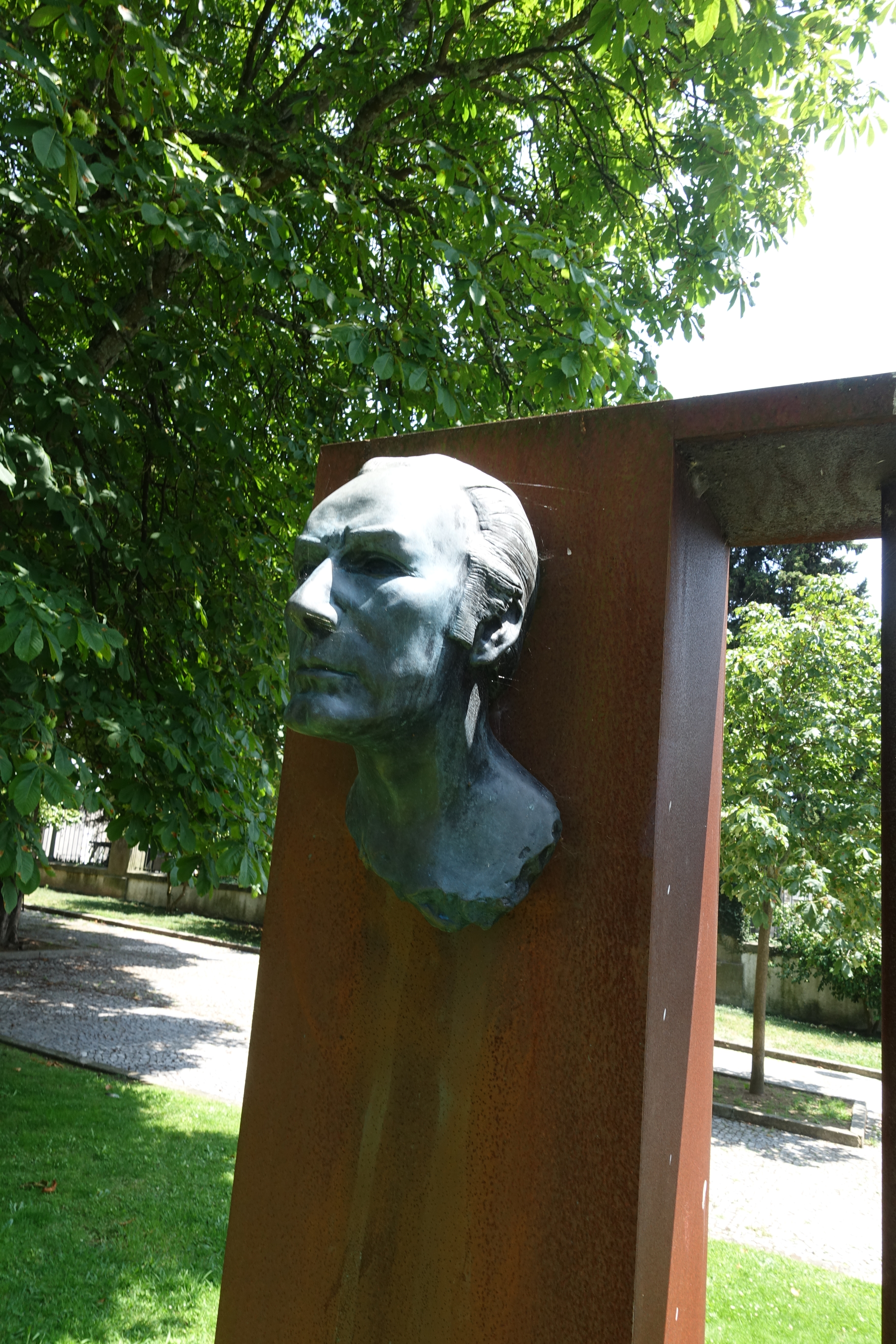
Hermínio da Palma Inácio

Hermínio da Palma Inácio (29 January 1922 – 14 July 2009) was a Portuguese revolutionary against the Salazar dictatorship.

== Biography ==
Palma Inácio began the anti-fascist struggle at age 25 as a member of the Golpe dos Militares, a movement launched on 10 April 1947. He carried out the sabotage of airplanes at the Granja Air Base in Sintra, where he had served under General Humberto Delgado. He was arrested by the PIDE, Portugal's secret police, after seven months of hiding on a farm in Odivelas, and was imprisoned at the Cadeia do Aljube. He escaped on 16 May 1948, with four sheets wrapped around his legs under his pants, he joined the other inmates in line for the bathroom. A brief moment of the guard's absence allowed him to throw himself through the window, at a height of around 15 meters from the ground, falling outside the building next to the sentry, who had no time to react.

Palma Inácio disappeared into a crowd and fled to Morocco and then to the United States, and then to Rio de Janeiro in Brazil, where he joined other opponents of the Salazar regime. On 10 November 1961, Palma Inacio and several other revolutionaries hijacked a TAP/Air Portugal plane after it departed from Casablanca, ordered the pilot to fly over Lisbon, and dropped 100,000 anti-fascist leaflets before flying back to Casablanca before Portuguese Air Force fighters could intercept it. After returning to Brazil, Palma Inácio's group masterminded the robbery of a branch of the Banco de Portugal in Figueira da Foz on 17 May 1967.

From Paris, the LUAR (Liga de Unidade e Ação Revolucionária) — and Palma Inácio planned another coup, which would ultimately fail to take the city of Covilhã, and he was arrested and detained by the PIDE. He managed to escape from prison in Porto by sawing through the bars of his cell with blades that his sister had brought to him. In November 1973, after having entered Portugal clandestinely for yet another operation, Palma Inácio was once again detained by the Direcção Geral de Segurança (DGS), the successor to the PIDE.

On 25 April 1974, in his cell inside the Fortress of Caxias, he received, first news that a military coup was underway, from a car horn using Morse code. The following day, General Spinola's order for the release of political prisoners arrived. Palma Inácio was the last to leave, as some soldiers, who refused to see the assault on Figueira da Foz as a political operation, resisted his release.

As António de Almeida Santos argues in the book Quase Retratos, Palma Inácio's actions were guided by a scrupulous desire to avoid bloodshed. After 25 April revolution, he kept LUAR in neutral, awaiting the consolidation of democracy and expressing disapproval of attempts to establish a left-wing military dictatorship. At the beginning of 1976, given the normalization of political life, he dissolved LUAR, starting to live as a very modest ordinary citizen and refusing benefits and privileges.

== Distinctions and honors ==
When Mário Soares became President of the Republic, he wanted to honor Palma Inácio with the Grand Cross of the Order of Liberty, but the Council of Orders was opposed. On 10 May 2000, Jorge Sampaio the successor of Soares as president, issued the award to Palma Inácio.
