= R. S. Perera =

Ceylonese politician

Hon. Ranawakaarachchige Solomon Perera

Member of Parliament for Kelaniya
- In office 1960–1977

Personal details
- Party: Sri Lanka Freedom Party
- Profession: Politician

Ranawakaarachchige Solomon Perera was a Sri Lankan politician. He was the Minister of Information and Broadcasting in the Second Sirimavo Bandaranaike cabinet and was the member of Parliament of Sri Lanka from Kelaniya representing the Sri Lanka Freedom Party in 1960 to 1977. He unsuccessfully contested the March 1960 parliamentary election.
