= Semage Salman Kulatileke =

Sri Lankan judge (1907–1979)

Hon. S. S. Kulatileke

Member of Parliament for Appointed
- In office 7 June 1970 – 22 May 1972

Personal details
- Born: Semage Salman Kulatileke; 18 August 1907
- Died: 14 September 1979 (aged 72)
- Party: Sri Lanka Freedom Party
- Relations: Nanda Mathew (son-in-law)
- Education: Mahinda College, Galle; Royal College, Colombo; University College London
- Occupation: judge, politician
- Profession: Advocate
- Ethnicity: Sinhalese

Semage Salman Kulatileke (18 August 1907 – 14 September 1979) was a Sri Lankan judge and member of the Parliament of Sri Lanka.

== Early life and education ==
Semage Salman Kulatileke was born on 18 August 1907 in Galle. His primary education was at Mahinda College in Galle before he received a Governor's scholarship to study at Royal College, Colombo. He then entered University College London where he studied law and obtained his BA. He was admitted to the Bar as an advocate in September 1937.

== Legal career ==
Having started his legal practice in the unofficial bar in Colombo, in 1949, he joined the Ceylon Judicial Service and was appointed Additional Magistrate, Colombo. He later served as the District Judge of Tangalle and thereafter Kurunegala.

== Political career ==
Kulatileke was elected to the Colombo Municipal Council and served as a municipal councilor until 1949. In 1970, he was appointed to Parliament by the Governor General of Ceylon as one of six appointed members.

== Family ==
His daughter married Nanda Mathew.

== See also ==
- List of political families in Sri Lanka
