= Second Sirimavo Bandaranaike cabinet =

- 9th Cabinet of Ceylon
- Date formed: 29 May 1970
- Date dissolved: 23 July 1977

People and organisations
- Monarch: Elizabeth II (1970–72)
- President: William Gopallawa (1972–77)
- Prime Minister: Sirimavo Bandaranaike
- Member parties: Sri Lanka Freedom Party; Lanka Sama Samaja Party (1970–75); Communist Party of Sri Lanka (1970–77)
- Status in legislature: Majority coalition
- Opposition party: United National Party
- Opposition leader: J. R. Jayewardene

History
- Election: 1970
- Outgoing election: 1977
- Legislature term: 7th
- Predecessor: Dudley Senanayake III
- Successor: Jayewardene

The Second Sirimavo Bandaranaike cabinet was the central government of Ceylon led by Prime Minister Sirimavo Bandaranaike between 1970 and 1977. It was formed in May 1970 after the parliamentary election and it ended in July 1977 after the opposition's victory in the parliamentary election. The second Sirimavo Bandaranaike cabinet saw Ceylon severing the last colonial ties with Britain as the country became a parliamentary republic in May 1972. The country was also renamed Sri Lanka.

By July 1970, a Constitutional Assembly replaced the British-drafted constitution with one drafted by the Ceylonese. Policies were introduced requiring that permanent secretaries in the government ministries have expertise in their division. For example, those serving in the Ministry of Housing had to be trained engineers, and those serving in the Ministry of Health, medical practitioners. All government employees were allowed to join Workers Councils and at the local level, she established People's Committees to allow input from the population at large on government administration. The changes were intended to remove elements of British colonisation and foreign influence from the country's institutions.

The Cabinet was made up of the Sri Lanka Freedom Party, the Lanka Sama Samaja Party (LSSP) and the Communist Party of Sri Lanka in a coalition government as the United Front. Key members of the LSSP were given cabinet roles, including Leslie Goonewardene, N. M. Perera, Colvin R. de Silva and others. The LSSP was dismissed from the cabinet by Bandaranaike in September 1975, ending the United Front, and in February 1972 the Communist Party also left the government.

== Cabinet members ==
Name	Portrait	Party	Office	Took office	Left office	Refs
Senator Sirimavo Bandaranaike		Sri Lanka Freedom Party	Prime Minister	29 May 1970	23 July 1977	
Senator Sirimavo Bandaranaike		Sri Lanka Freedom Party	Minister of Defence and External Affairs	31 May 1970		
Senator Sirimavo Bandaranaike		Sri Lanka Freedom Party	Minister of Defence and Foreign Affairs			
Senator Sirimavo Bandaranaike		Sri Lanka Freedom Party	Minister of Planning and Employment	31 May 1970		
Senator Sirimavo Bandaranaike		Sri Lanka Freedom Party	Minister of Planning and Economic Affairs			
Senator Sirimavo Bandaranaike		Sri Lanka Freedom Party	Minister of Plan Implementation			
W. P. G. Ariyadasa			Minister of Local Government			
Felix Dias Bandaranaike		Sri Lanka Freedom Party	Minister of Public Administration, Local Government and Home Affairs	31 May 1970		
Felix Dias Bandaranaike		Sri Lanka Freedom Party	Minister of Justice	1970	1975	
Felix Dias Bandaranaike		Sri Lanka Freedom Party	Minister of Finance	3 September 1975	18 May 1977	
Colvin R. de Silva		Lanka Sama Samaja Party	Minister of Plantation Industries	31 May 1970	2 September 1975	
Colvin R. de Silva		Lanka Sama Samaja Party	Minister of Constitutional Affairs		2 September 1975	
M. P. de Zoysa			Minister of Labour			
Leslie Goonewardene		Lanka Sama Samaja Party	Minister of Communications	31 May 1970		
Leslie Goonewardene		Lanka Sama Samaja Party	Minister of Transport		2 September 1975	
T. B. Ilangaratne		Sri Lanka Freedom Party	Minister of Foreign and Internal Trade			
T. B. Ilangaratne		Sri Lanka Freedom Party	Minister of Trade			
T. B. Ilangaratne		Sri Lanka Freedom Party	Minister of Public Administration and Home Affairs			
P. B. G. Kalugalla		Sri Lanka Freedom Party	Minister of Shipping, Aviation and Tourism			
Pieter Keuneman		Communist Party	Minister of Housing and Construction	31 May 1970	February 1977	
Hector Kobbekaduwa		Sri Lanka Freedom Party	Minister of Agriculture and Lands			
S. S. Kulatileke			Minister of Social Services			
Senator Chelliah Kumarasuriar			Minister of Posts and Telecommunications	31 May 1970		
Badi-ud-din Mahmud		Sri Lanka Freedom Party	Minister of Education	31 May 1970		
N. M. Perera		Lanka Sama Samaja Party	Minister of Finance	31 May 1970	2 September 1975	
R. S. Perera			Minister of Information and Broadcasting			
George Rajapaksa		Sri Lanka Freedom Party	Minister of Health			
George Rajapaksa		Sri Lanka Freedom Party	Minister of Fisheries			
K. B. Ratnayake		Sri Lanka Freedom Party	Minister of Parliamentary Affairs and Sports	1972	1976	
K. B. Ratnayake		Sri Lanka Freedom Party	Minister of Transport			
Maithripala Senanayake		Sri Lanka Freedom Party	Minister of Irrigation, Power and Highways	31 May 1970		
T. B. Subasinghe		Sri Lanka Freedom Party	Minister of Industries and Scientific Affairs		1 March 1977	
S. K. K. Suriarachchi		Sri Lanka Freedom Party	Minister of Food, Co-operatives and Small Industries			
T. B. Tennekoon			Minister of Cultural Affairs			
Ratnasiri Wickremanayake		Sri Lanka Freedom Party	Minister of Plantation Industries			
Ratnasiri Wickremanayake		Sri Lanka Freedom Party	Minister of Justice	1975	1977	

== Parliamentary secretaries and deputy ministers ==
Name	Portrait	Party	Office	Took office	Left office	Refs
A. L. Abdul Majeed		Sri Lanka Freedom Party	Deputy Minister of Information and Broadcasting			
C. A. Atapattu		Sri Lanka Freedom Party	Parliamentary Secretary to the Minister of Post and Telecommunication			
B. H. Bandara			Deputy Minister of Housing and Construction			
Neal de Alwis			Deputy Minister of Finance	1 October 1975	4 February 1977	
Vivienne Goonewardene		Lanka Sama Samaja Party	Parliamentary Secretary to the Minister of Local Government	1970	1975	
T. B. M. Herath			Deputy Minister of Transport			
Lakshman Jayakody		Sri Lanka Freedom Party	Deputy Minister of Defence and External Affairs			
S. D. R. Jayaratne			Deputy Minister of Fisheries			
Albert Kariyawasam			Deputy Minister of Plantation Industries			
V. T. G. Karunaratne			Deputy Minister of Posts and Telecommunications			
H. M. Navaratne			Deputy Minister of Agriculture and Lands			
Siva Obeyesekere			Deputy Minister of Health			
P. R. Ratnayake			Deputy Minister of Trade			
G. W. Samarasinghe			Deputy Minister of Social Services			
Ratna Deshapriya Senanayake			Deputy Minister of Planning and Economic Affairs			
Ratna Deshapriya Senanayake			Deputy Minister of Plan Implementation			
Senerath Somaratne			Deputy Minister of Irrigation, Power and Highways			
Hemachandra Sirisena			Deputy Minister of Labour			
B. Y. Tudawe		Communist Party	Parliamentary Secretary to the Minister of Education		1977	
B. Y. Tudawe		Communist Party	Deputy Minister of Education		February 1977	
Ratnasiri Wickremanayake		Sri Lanka Freedom Party	Deputy Minister of Justice	1970	1975	
M. M. Mustapha			Deputy Minister of Justice	1975	1997	
D. P. Wickremasinghe			Deputy Minister of Shipping and Tourism			
