= 16th BRICS summit =

2024 international relations conference

2024 BRICS summit 16th BRICS summit
- 22–24 October 2024

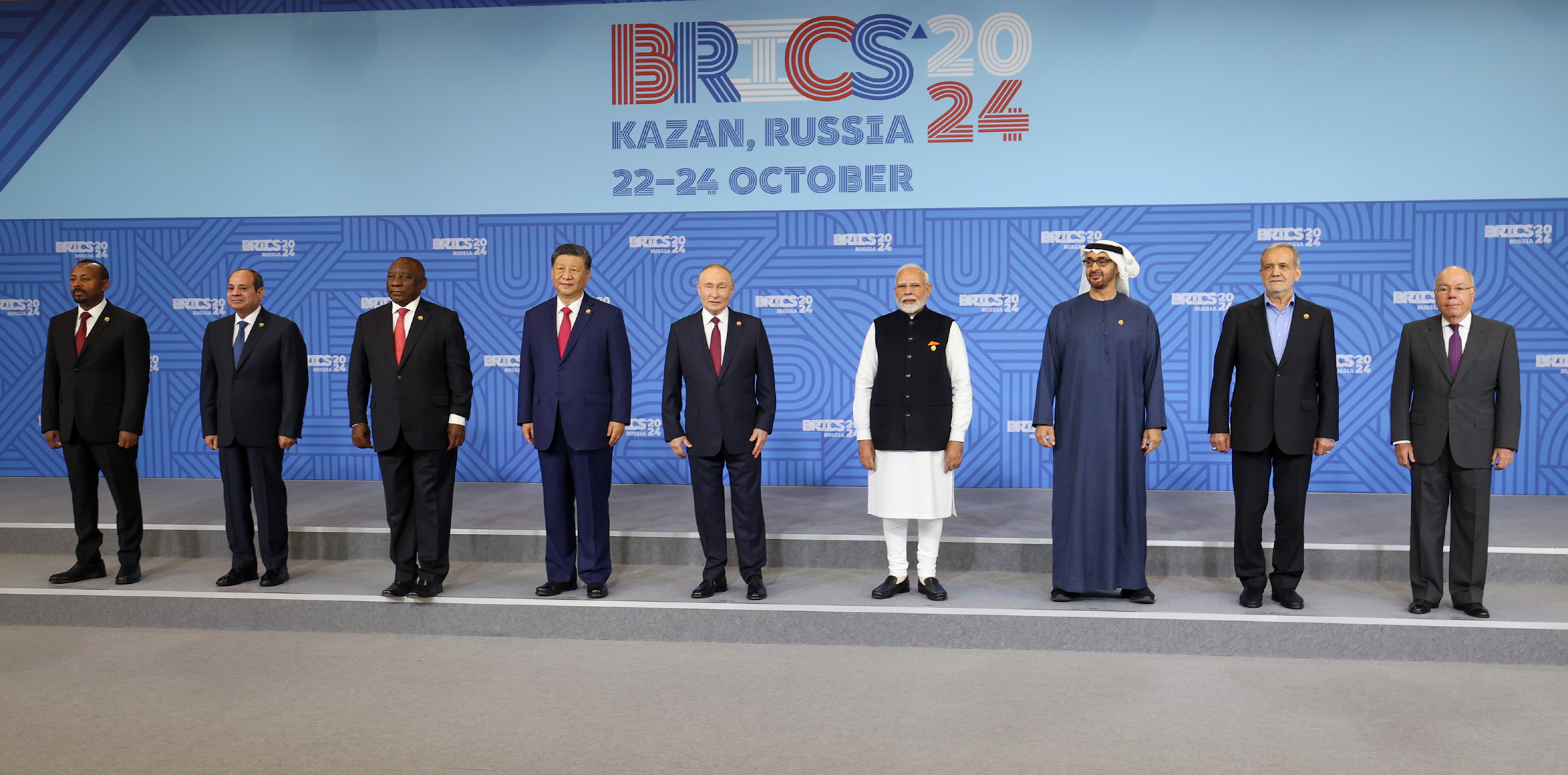
- Host country: Russia
- Cities: Kazan
- Participants: Brazil; Russia; India; China; South Africa; Egypt; Ethiopia; Iran; United Arab Emirates; United Nations
- Chair: Vladimir Putin, President of Russia
- Website: brics-russia2024.ru

The 2024 BRICS summit was the sixteenth annual BRICS summit, held in Kazan, Russia. It was the first BRICS summit to include Egypt, Ethiopia, Iran, and the United Arab Emirates as members, following their accession to the organization at the 15th BRICS summit.

== Outcome ==
The theme of the event was: “Strengthening Multilateralism for Fair Global Development and Security.”

UN Secretary-General António Guterres spoke about the Russian invasion of Ukraine and said: "We need peace in Ukraine. A just peace in line with the UN Charter, international law and UN General Assembly resolutions."

Palestinian President Mahmoud Abbas attended the summit, and BRICS leaders called in a statement for the establishment of a Palestinian state within the 1967 borders.

BRICS members introduced a payment system named BRICS Pay designed to facilitate transactions and the interchange of financial information between central banks of partnered nations, serving as an alternative to the Western interbank system SWIFT. This system will facilitate international settlements.

The BRICS Kazan Declaration has been adopted. BRICS nations endorse reform of the UN and Security Council and the full participation of the State of Palestine in the United Nations, contingent upon the two-state solution. The Kazan Declaration expressed deep concern over the humanitarian situation in the Palestinian Territory, particularly the escalation of violence in Gaza and the West Bank, which resulted in significant civilian harm and displacement. The declaration also noted alarm over the situation in Southern Lebanon and called for an immediate cessation of hostilities. Additionally, it highlighted the adverse impact of unilateral sanctions on the global economy and the achievement of sustainable development goals. BRICS nations consented to deliberate and investigate the feasibility of creating an autonomous cross-border settlement and depository system. The finance ministers of BRICS nations will persist in evaluating the utilization of national currencies, payment tools, and platforms during the forthcoming Presidency and will report on the outcomes.

The Kazan Declaration emphasized adherence to the UN Charter and supported diplomatic efforts for a peaceful resolution to the conflict in Ukraine.

On 24 October, Russia hosted a plenary session of the 16th BRICS Summit in the BRICS Plus/Outreach format, bringing together CIS leaders, delegations from Asian, African, Middle Eastern, and Latin American countries, and the heads of several international organizations.

Thirteen nations have been added as partner countries of BRICS: Algeria, Belarus, Bolivia, Cuba, Indonesia, Kazakhstan, Malaysia, Nigeria, Thailand, Turkey, Uganda, Uzbekistan, and Vietnam.

=== Bilateral meetings ===
==== China-Russia ====
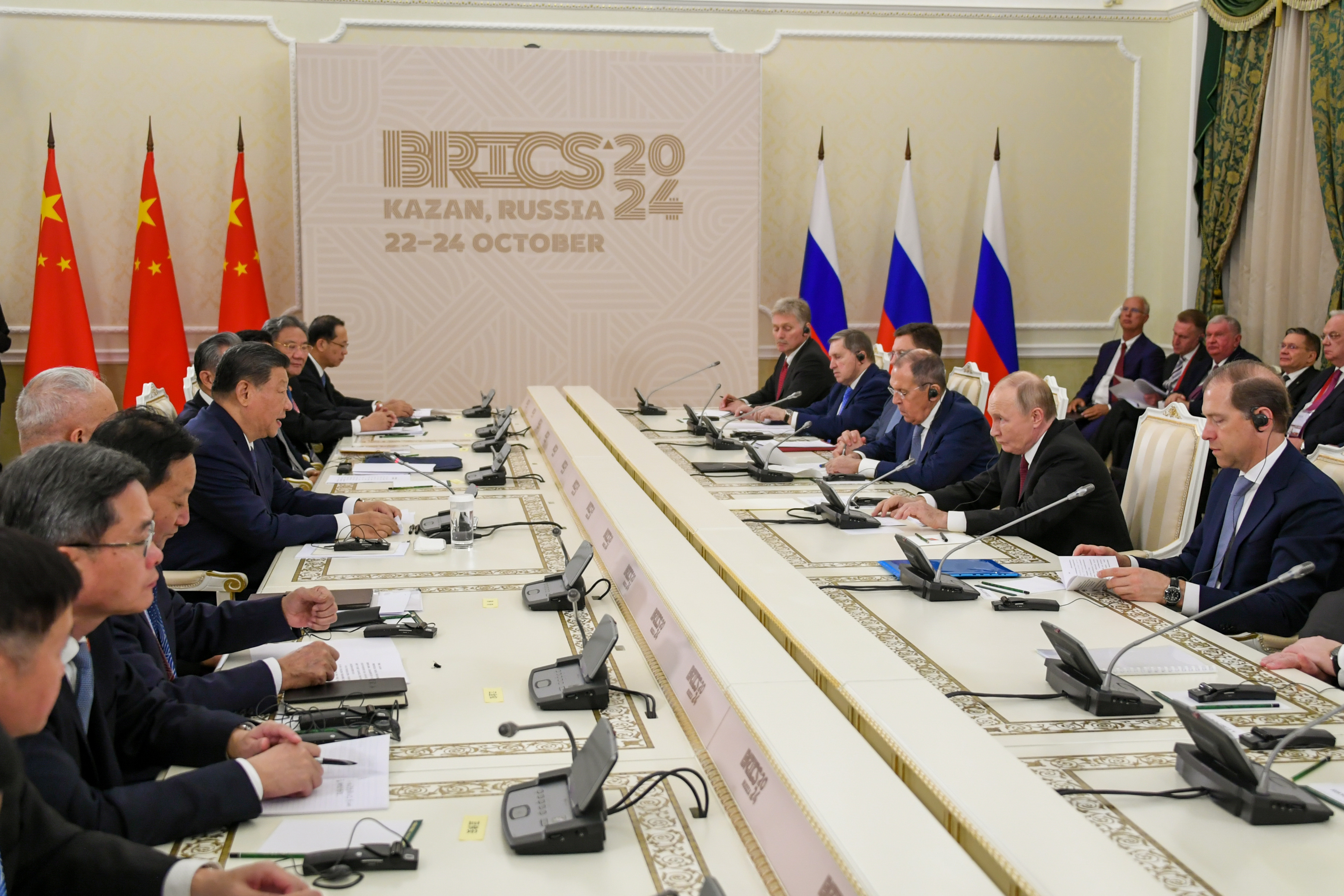
Meeting between Xi Jinping and Vladimir Putin at 2024 BRICS Summit

Chinese leader Xi Jinping and Russian President Vladimir Putin held a bilateral meeting in Kazan. The presidents affirmed that the China–Russia relations are profound and unchanging even in the current turbulent geo-political situation, and agreed that they must persist in advancing the comprehensive integration of the Belt and Road Initiative with the Eurasian Economic Union, therefore facilitating and bolstering the high-quality advancement of their economies. The parties concurred that, in light of the 80th anniversary of the establishment of the United Nations and the 80th anniversary of the victory in World War II in 2025, China and the Russian Federation will persist in enhancing their comprehensive strategic cooperation and upholding the international system centered on the United Nations. The participants articulated their intention to enhance the BRICS cooperation framework and to achieve "Greater BRICS Cooperation".

Russia expressed interests in an alternative international payment solutions among BRICS nation to avoid US secondary sanctions.

==== India-China ====
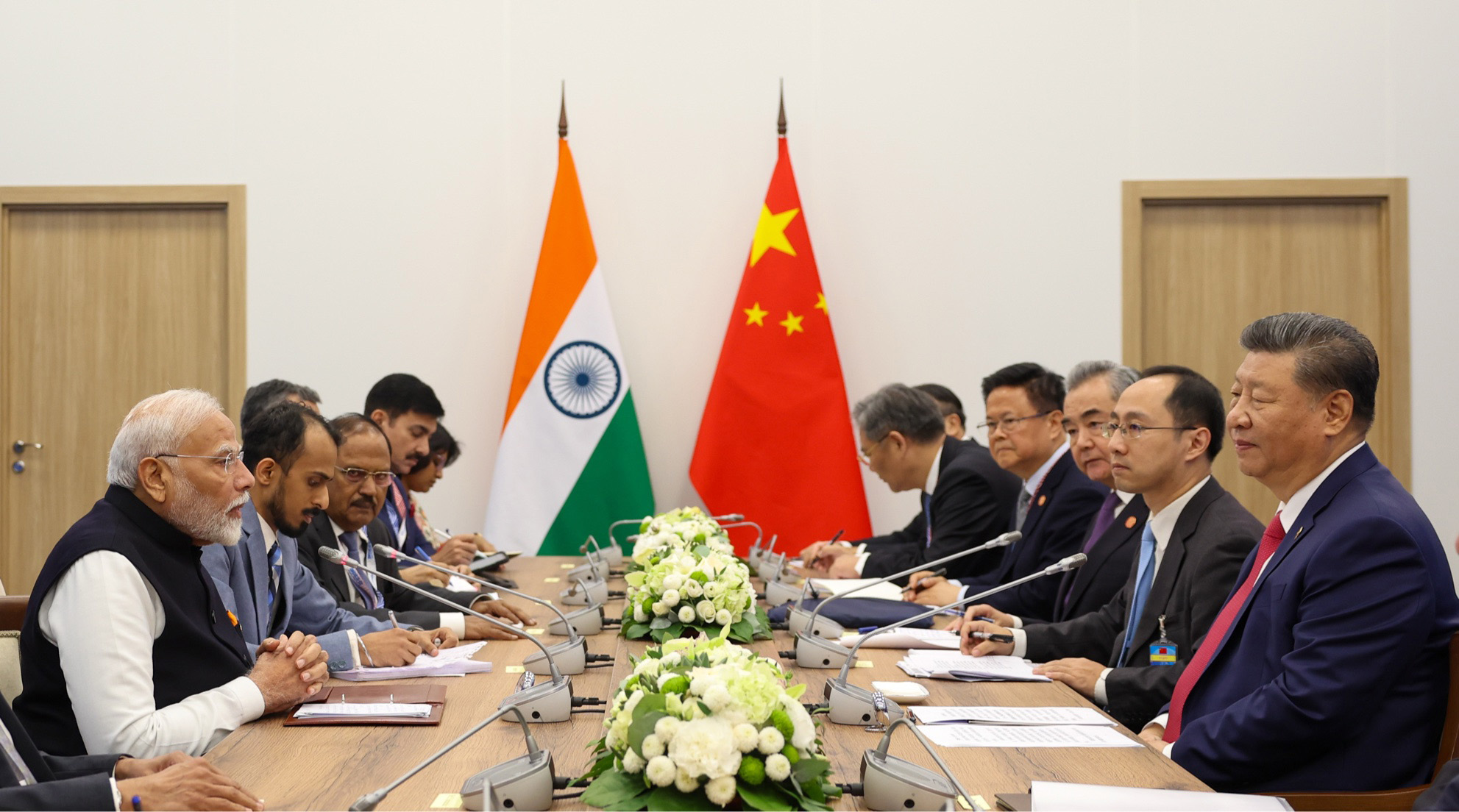
PM Narendra Modi meeting leader Xi Jinping at the 16th BRICS Summit

Indian PM Narendra Modi and Chinese leader Xi Jinping held their first formal bilateral meeting in five years, since the deadly clash between militaries of the two nations in 2020. The leaders declared they have reached a deal resolving a four-year stand-off, following by complete disengagement of troops. President Xi emphasized the importance of the two ancient civilizations in the global south, stating India-China relations will set an example for other emerging nations.

Modi stated that sustaining steady development of India–China relations is crucial for both nations and their populations, impacting the welfare and future of 2.8 billion individuals, and is also significant for regional and global peace and stability. China and India regard this meeting as constructive and significant, agreeing to approach China-India ties from a strategic and long-term perspective to prevent individual issues from impacting the overall relationship between the two nations.

==== India-Iran ====
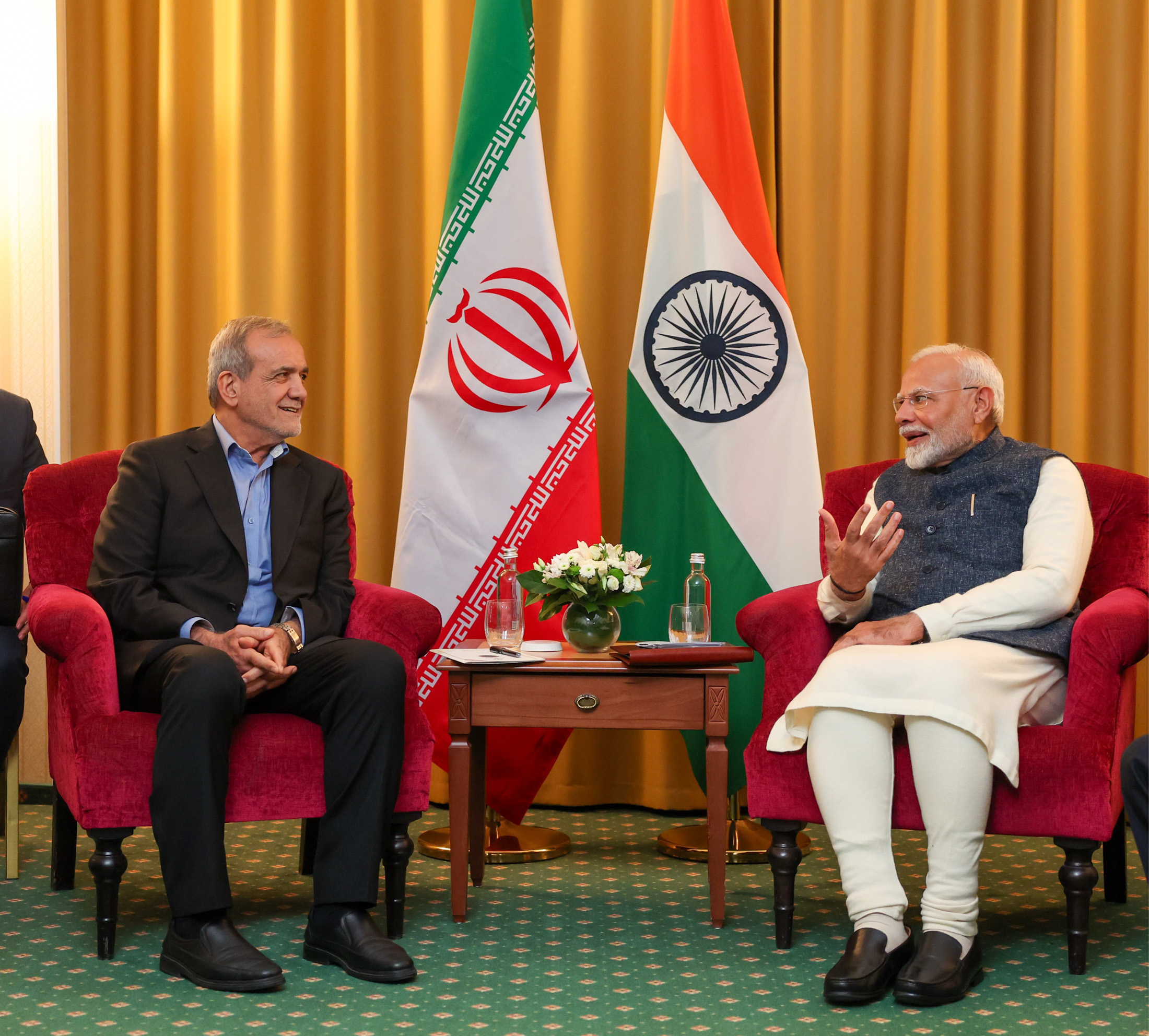
Masoud Pezeshkian meets Modi during BRICS Summit

Indian PM Narendra Modi and Iranian President Masoud Pezeshkian held bilateral meetings discussing continuation of Chabahar Port, the International North-South Transport Corridor, reconstruction of Afghanistan, economic and trade linkages to Central Asia, and minimising Israeli–Palestinian conflict.

President Pezeshkian accepted the invitation to visit India offered by India.

==== Russia-South Africa ====
South African President Cyril Ramaphosa held bilateral meeting with Russian President Vladimir Putin where he called Russia a "valued ally" for its support during apartheid.

== Participating leaders ==
=== In-person ===
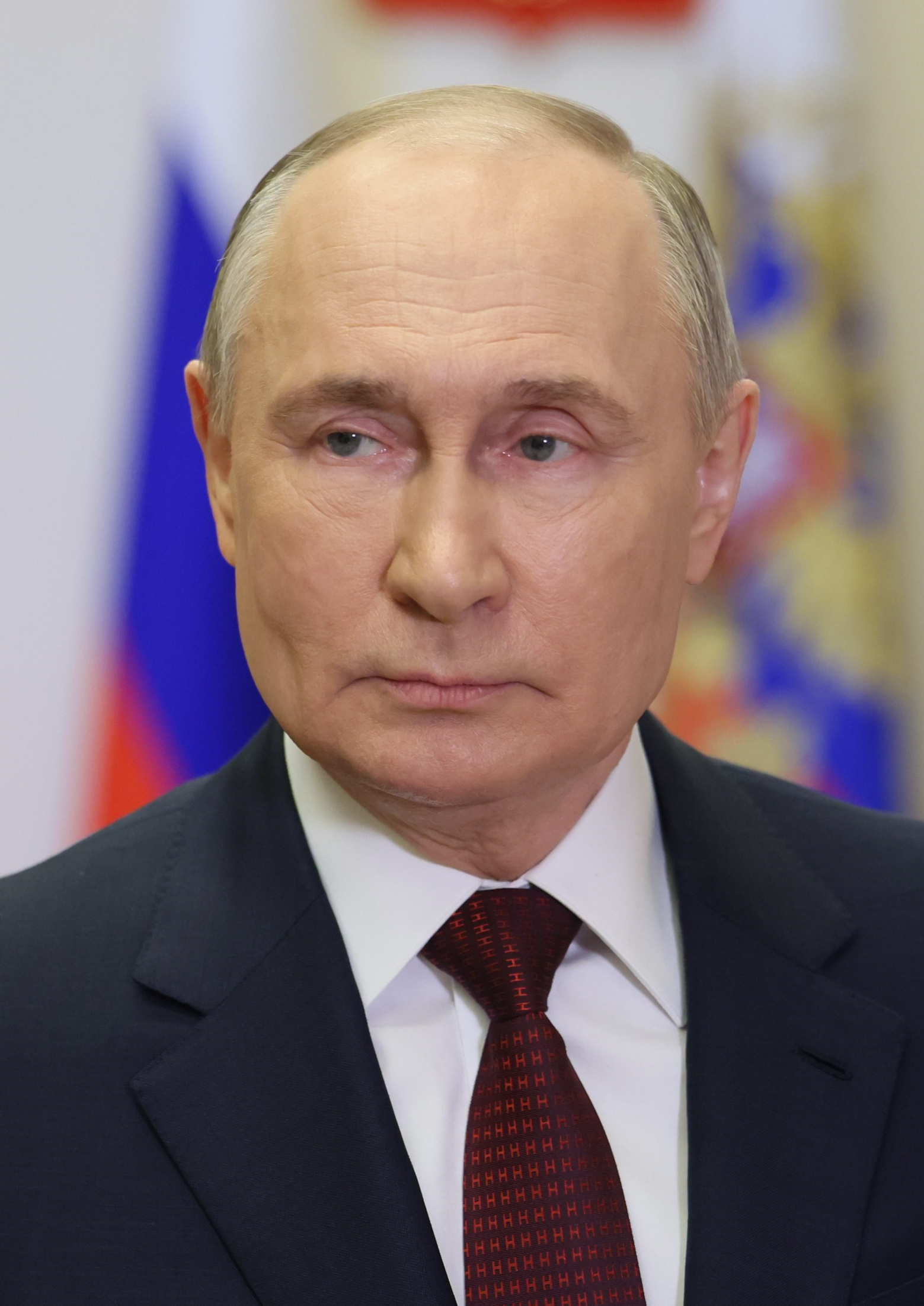
Russia
Vladimir Putin, President (host)

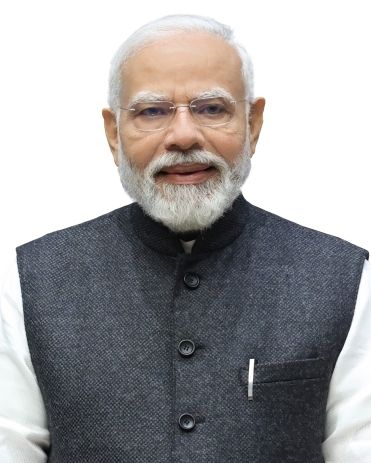
India
Narendra Modi, Prime Minister

China
Xi Jinping, CCP General Secretary and President (Note: The head of government of China is the Premier, while the President is legally a ceremonial office and has no real power in China's political system. However, the General Secretary of the Chinese Communist Party (top position) has always held this office since 1993 except for the months of transition, and the current paramount leader is Xi Jinping.)

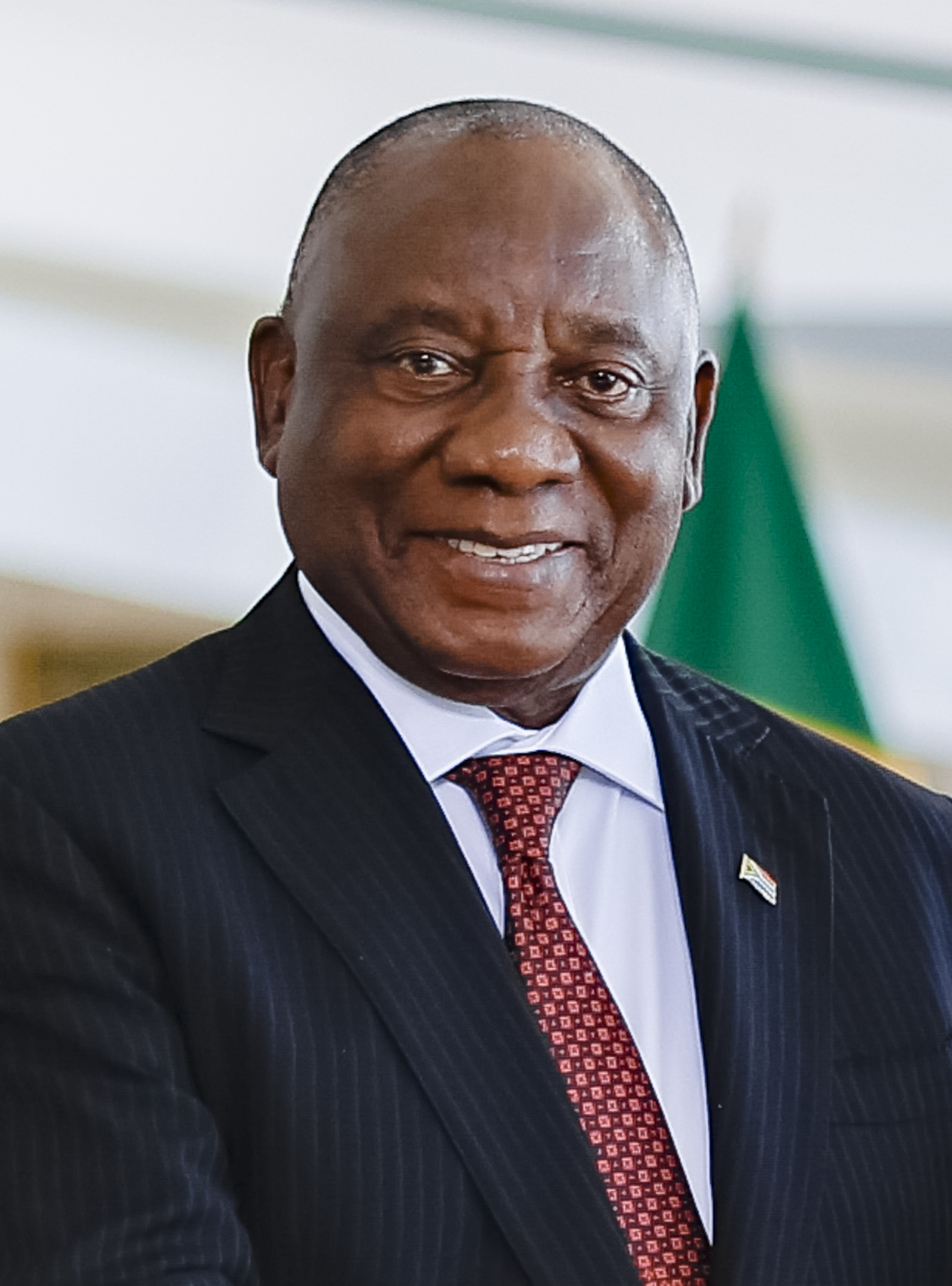
South Africa
Cyril Ramaphosa, President

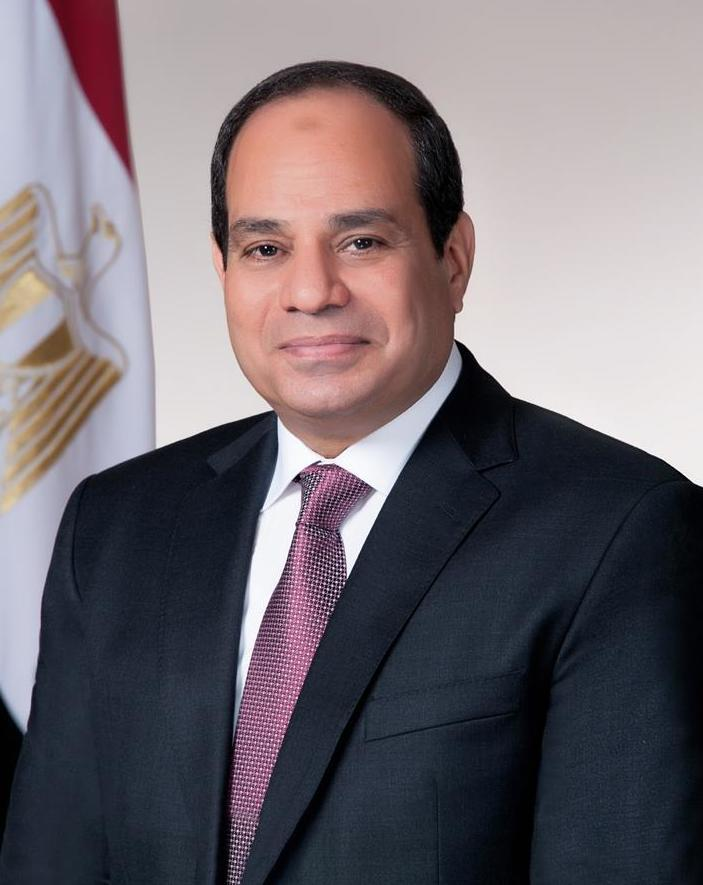
Egypt
Abdel Fattah El-Sisi, President

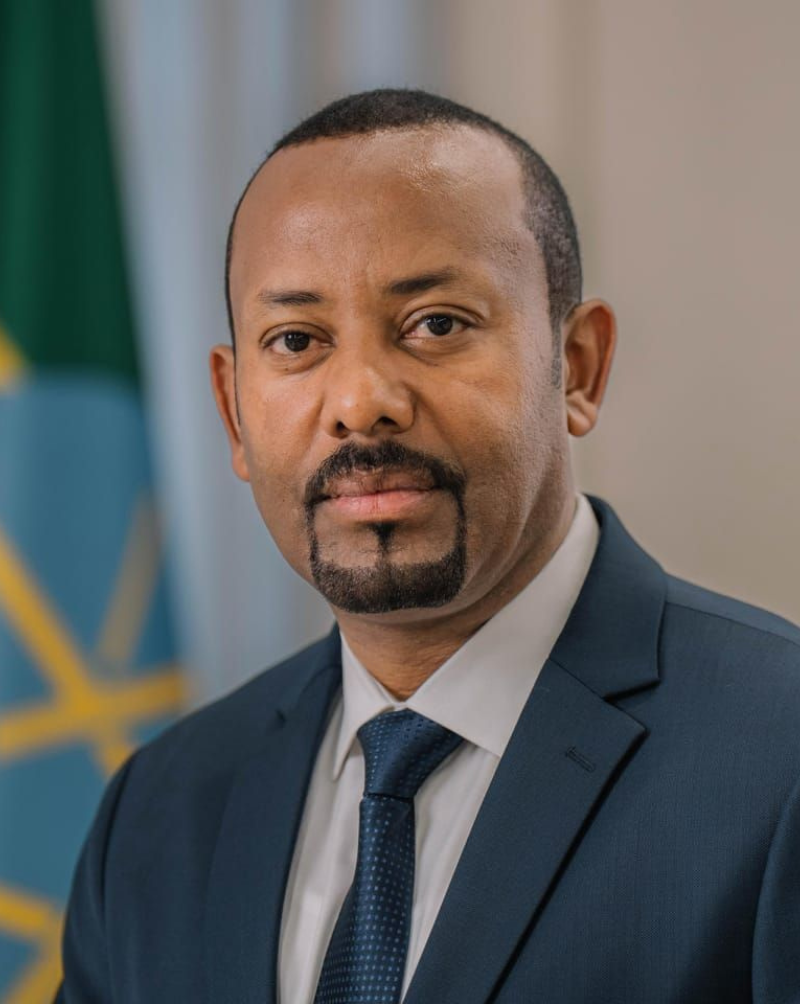
Ethiopia
Abiy Ahmed, Prime Minister

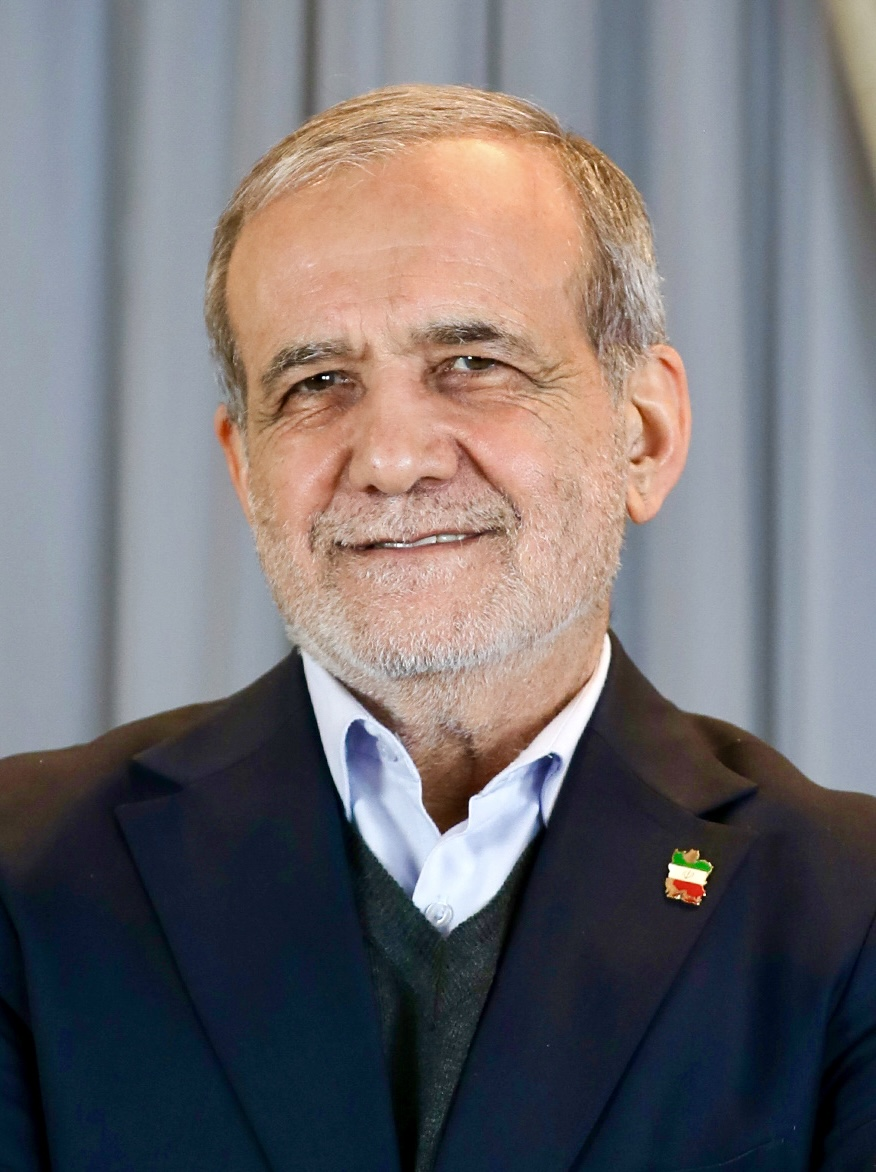
Iran
Masoud Pezeshkian, President

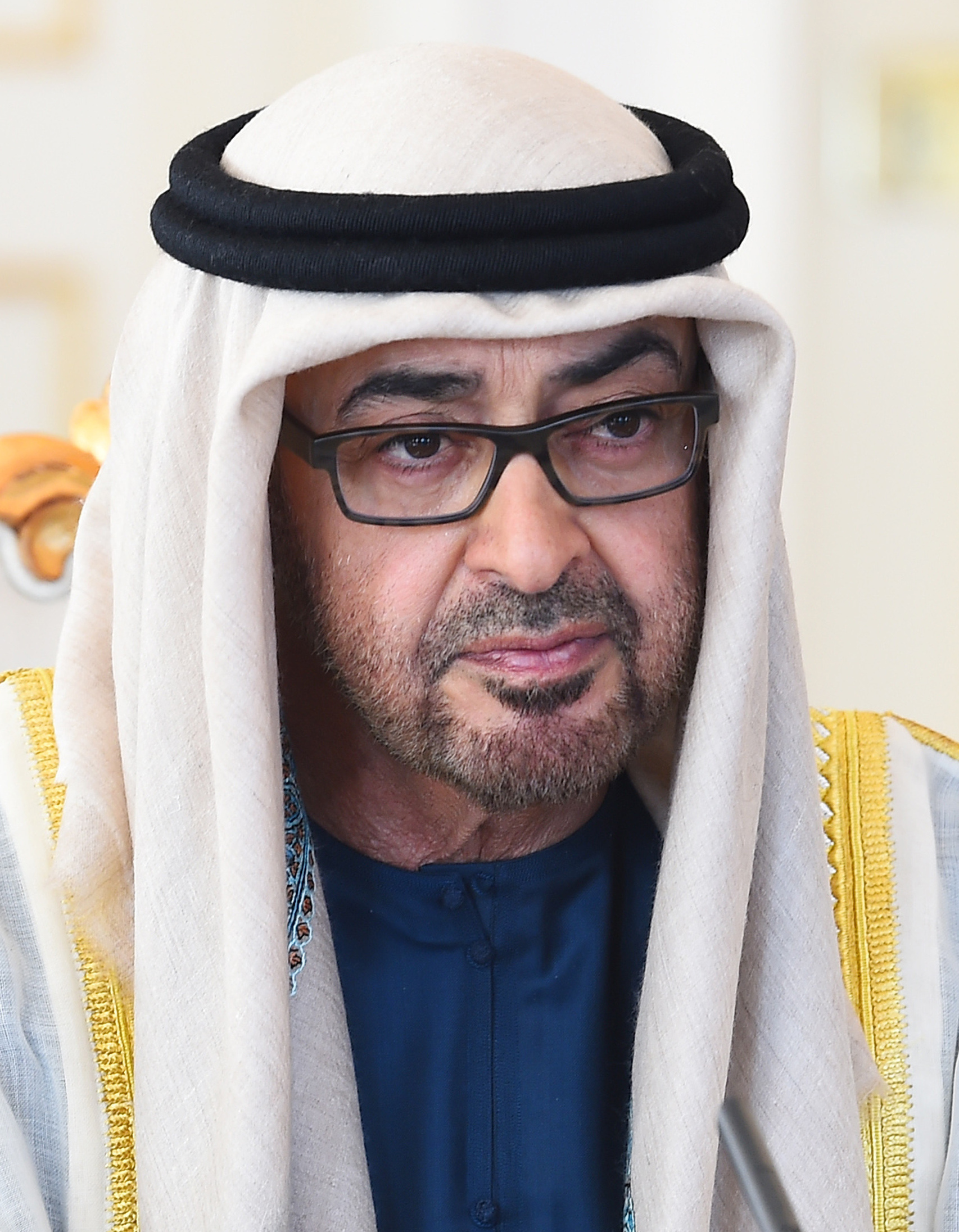
United Arab Emirates
Mohammed bin Zayed Al Nahyan, President

Indian prime minister Modi and South African president Ramaphosa chose to attend the BRICs summit instead of the 2024 Commonwealth Heads of Government Meeting, which was held the same week in Samoa. The Independent observed that this is a sign the two Commonwealth of Nations states "place greater weight on maintaining relations with China and Russia than on the more diffuse attractions of CHOGM".

=== Online ===
Two days before the start of the summit, Brazilian president Lula da Silva announced that he would not be attending in person due to a minor brain hemorrhage following a fall. However, he announced he would participate via videoconferencing. Foreign minister Mauro Vieira led the Brazilian delegation in place of da Silva.

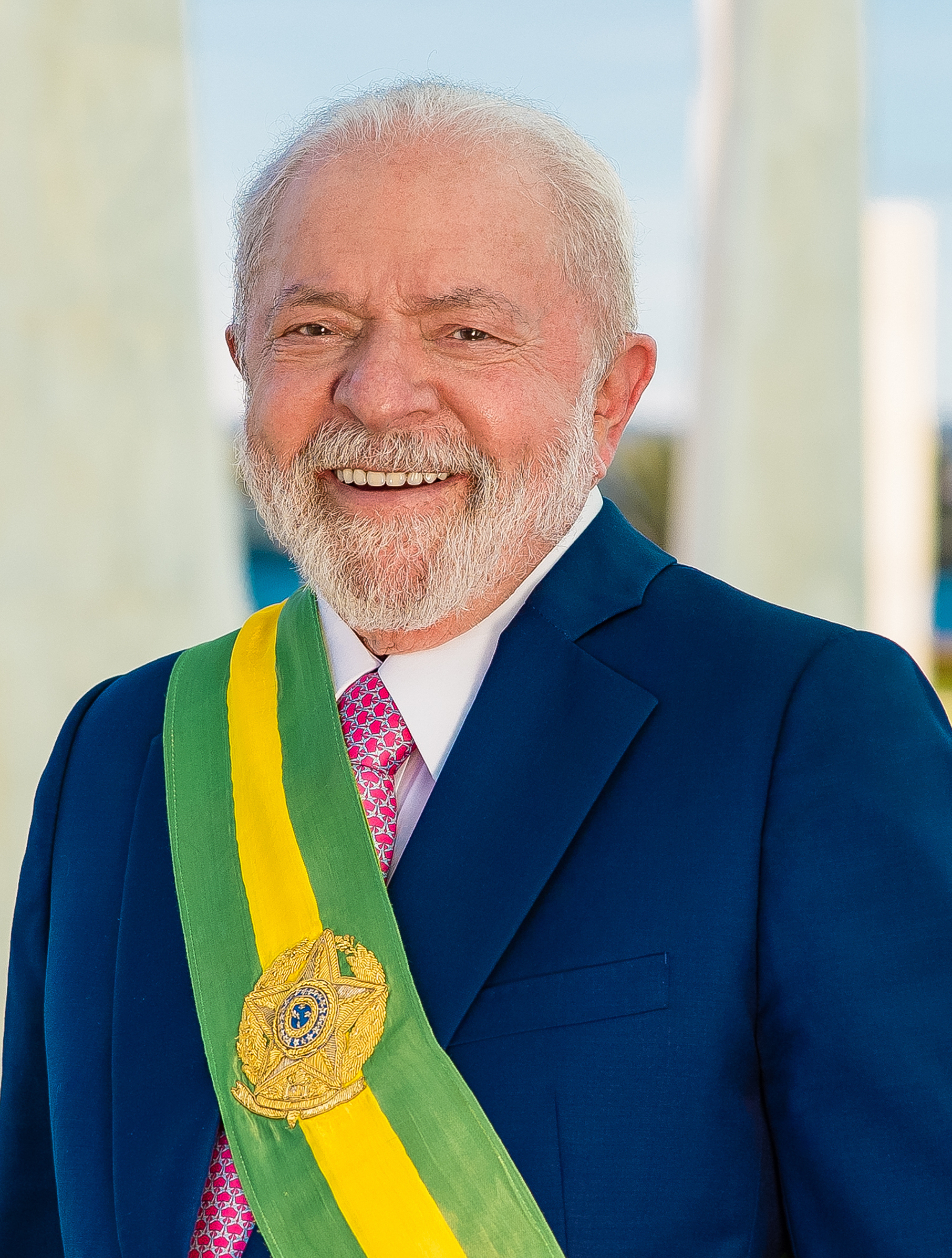
Brazil
Luiz Inácio Lula da Silva, President

== Host invited guests ==
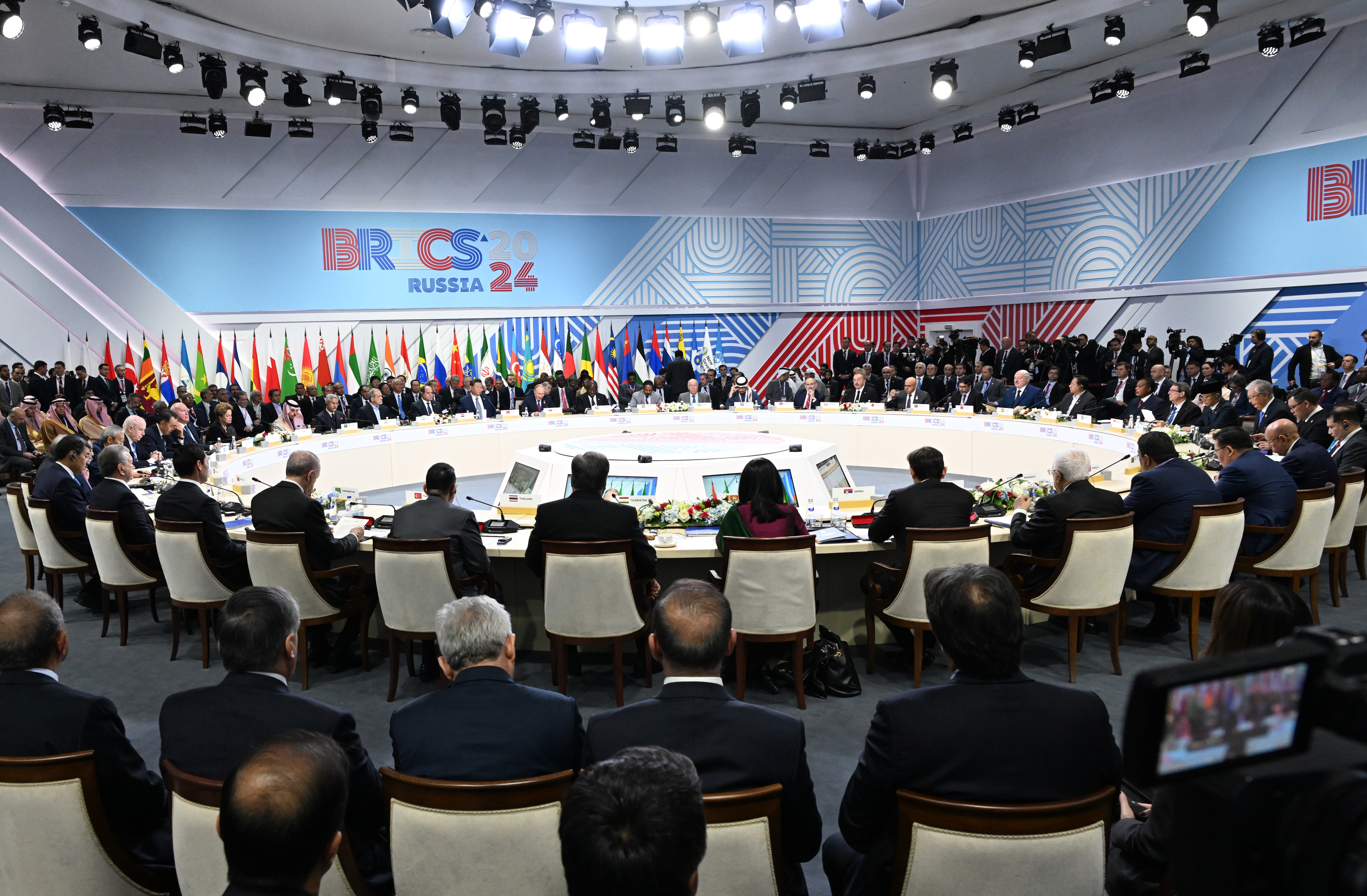
Plenary session of the BRICS Summit in the Outreach

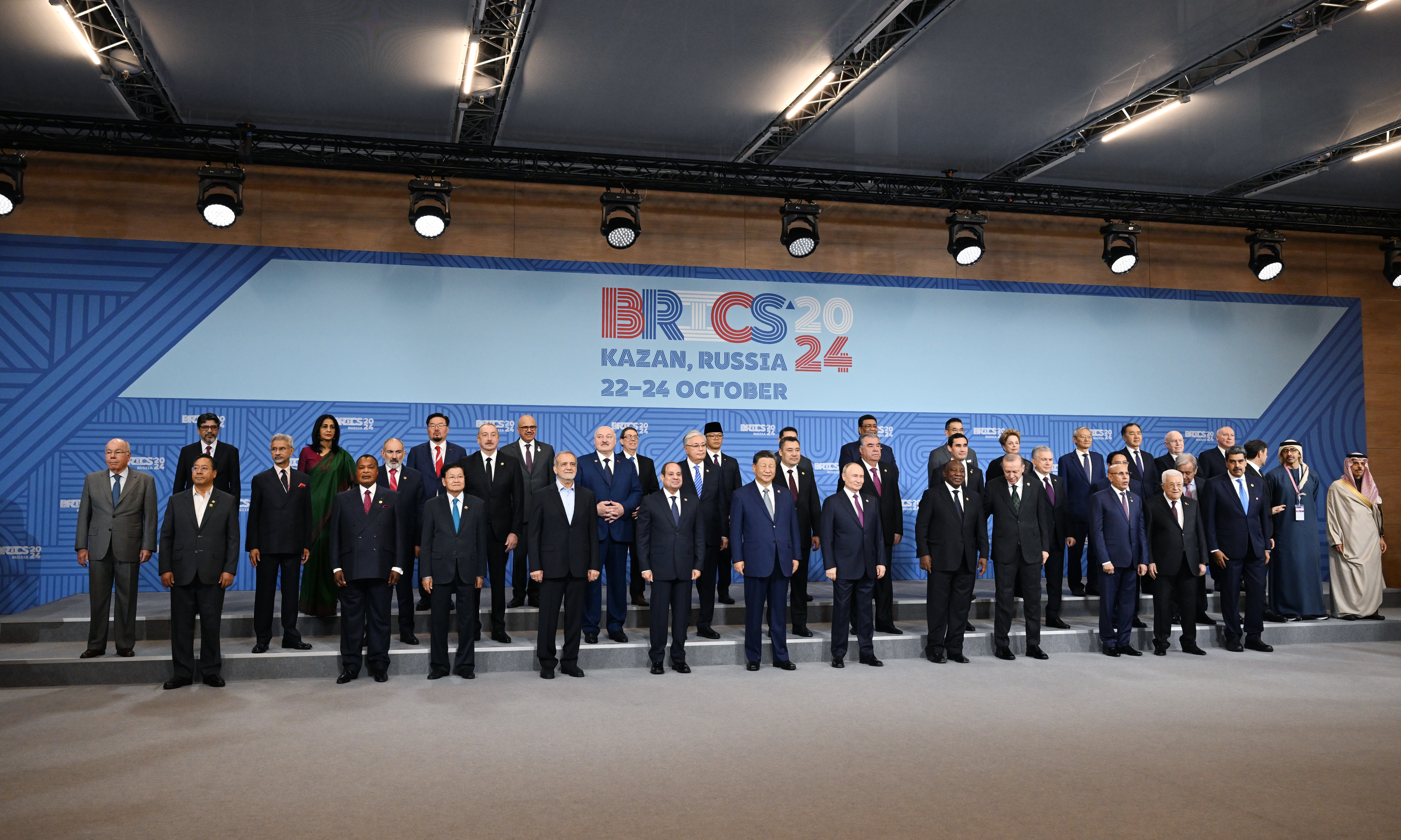
The heads of delegations attending the BRICS Summit in Kazan pose for photographs

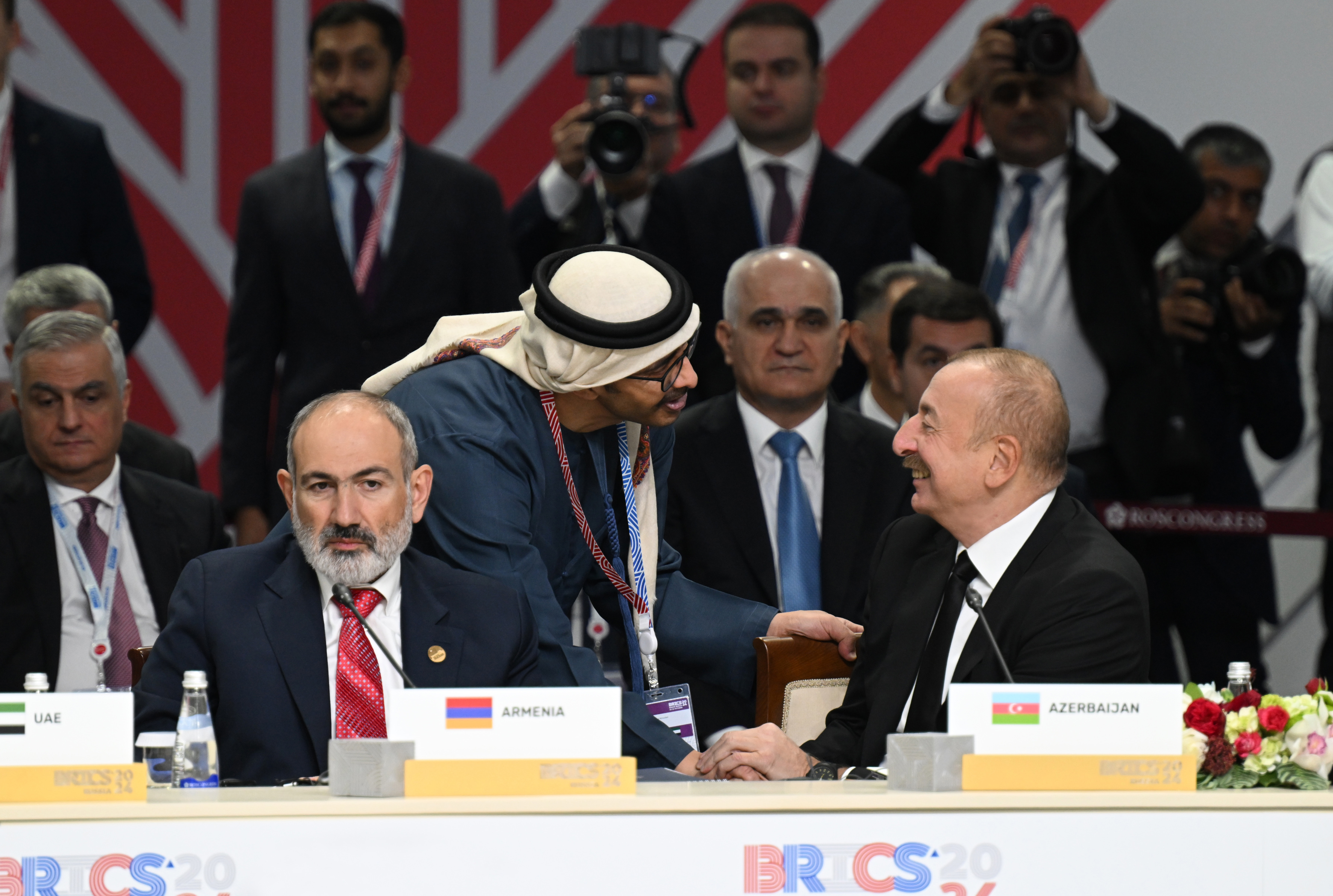
Armenian Prime Minister Nikol Pashinyan, Azerbaijani President Ilham Aliyev and UAE President Mohamed bin Zayed Al Nahyan

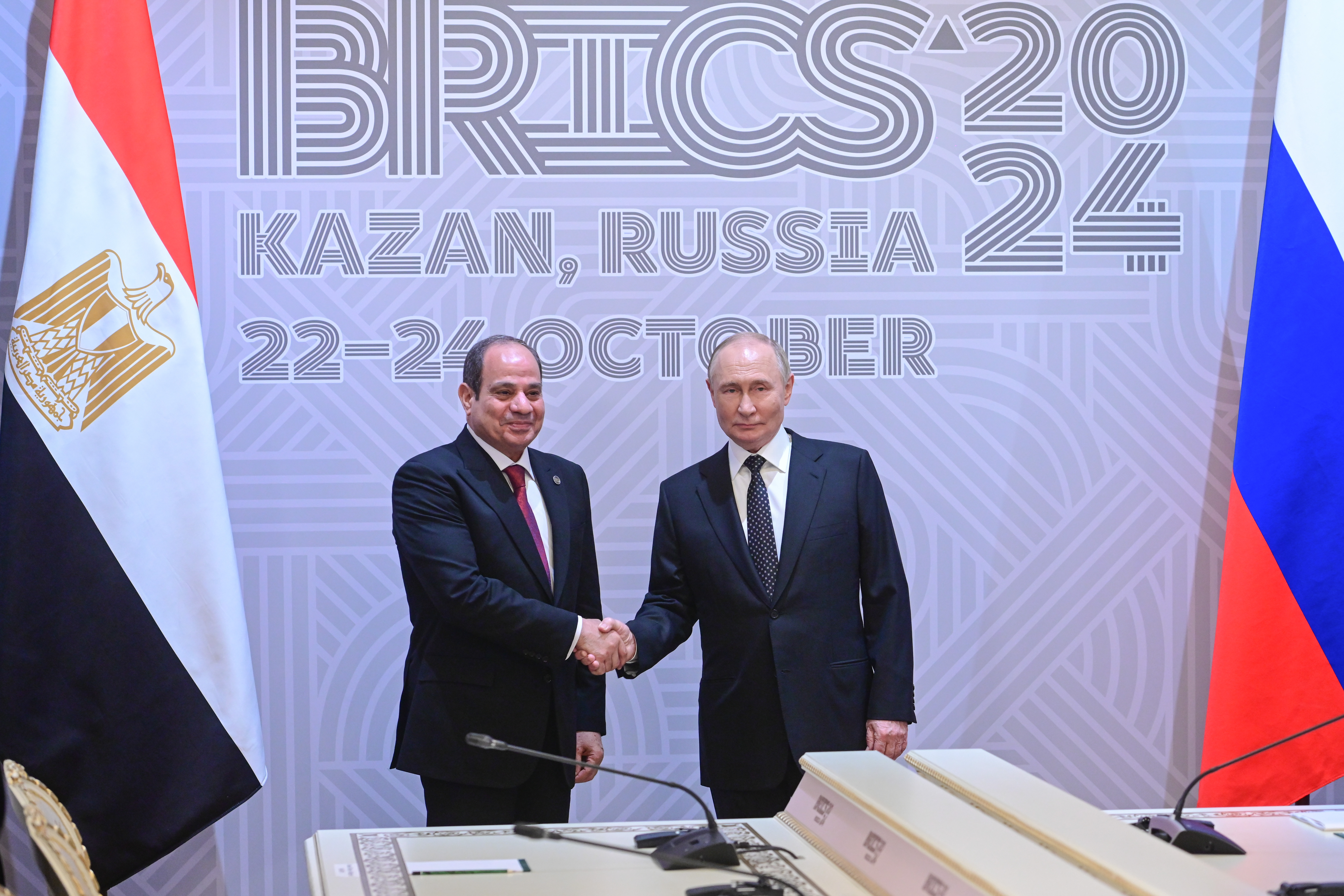
Vladimir Putin meeting Egyptian President Abdel Fattah el-Sisi

Miguel Díaz-Canel, First Secretary of the Communist Party of Cuba, was invited to the summit but stayed in Cuba due to the 2024 Cuba blackout. Aleksandar Vučić, president of Serbia, could not attend due to a conflicting visit from European Union representatives to Serbia. Both Cuba and Serbia sent representatives to the summit in place of their respective heads of state.

=== Other attendees ===
Country/Institution	Position	Officeholder	Source
Armenia	Prime Minister	Nikol Pashinyan	
Azerbaijan	President	Ilham Aliyev	
Bahrain	Foreign Minister	Abdullatif bin Rashid Al Zayani	
Bangladesh	Foreign Secretary	Md. Jashim Uddin	
Belarus	President	Alexander Lukashenko	
Bolivia	President	Luis Arce	
Congo	President	Denis Sassou Nguesso	
Cuba	Foreign Minister	Bruno Rodríguez Parrilla	
Indonesia	Minister of Foreign Affairs	Sugiono	
Kazakhstan	President	Kassym-Jomart Tokayev	
Kyrgyzstan	President	Sadyr Japarov	
Laos	General Secretary; President	Thongloun Sisoulith	
Malaysia	Minister of Economy	Rafizi Ramli	
Mauritania	President	Mohamed Ould Ghazouani	
Mongolia	Head of the Presidential Administration	Gombojavyn Zandanshatar	
Nicaragua	Minister of Foreign Affairs	Valdrack Jaentschke	
Palestine	President	Mahmoud Abbas	
Saudi Arabia	Foreign Minister	Faisal bin Farhan Al Saud	
Serbia	Deputy Prime Minister	Aleksandar Vulin	
Sri Lanka	Foreign Secretary	Aruni Wijewardane	
Republika Srpska (Bosnia and Herzegovina)	President	Milorad Dodik	
Tajikistan	President	Emomali Rahmon	
Thailand	Minister of Foreign Affairs	Maris Sangiampongsa	
Turkey	President	Recep Tayyip Erdoğan	
Turkmenistan	President	Serdar Berdimuhamedow	
Venezuela	President	Nicolás Maduro	
Vietnam	Prime Minister	Pham Minh Chinh	
United Nations	Secretary General	Antonio Guterres	
Uzbekistan	President	Shavkat Mirziyoyev	

== Controversy ==
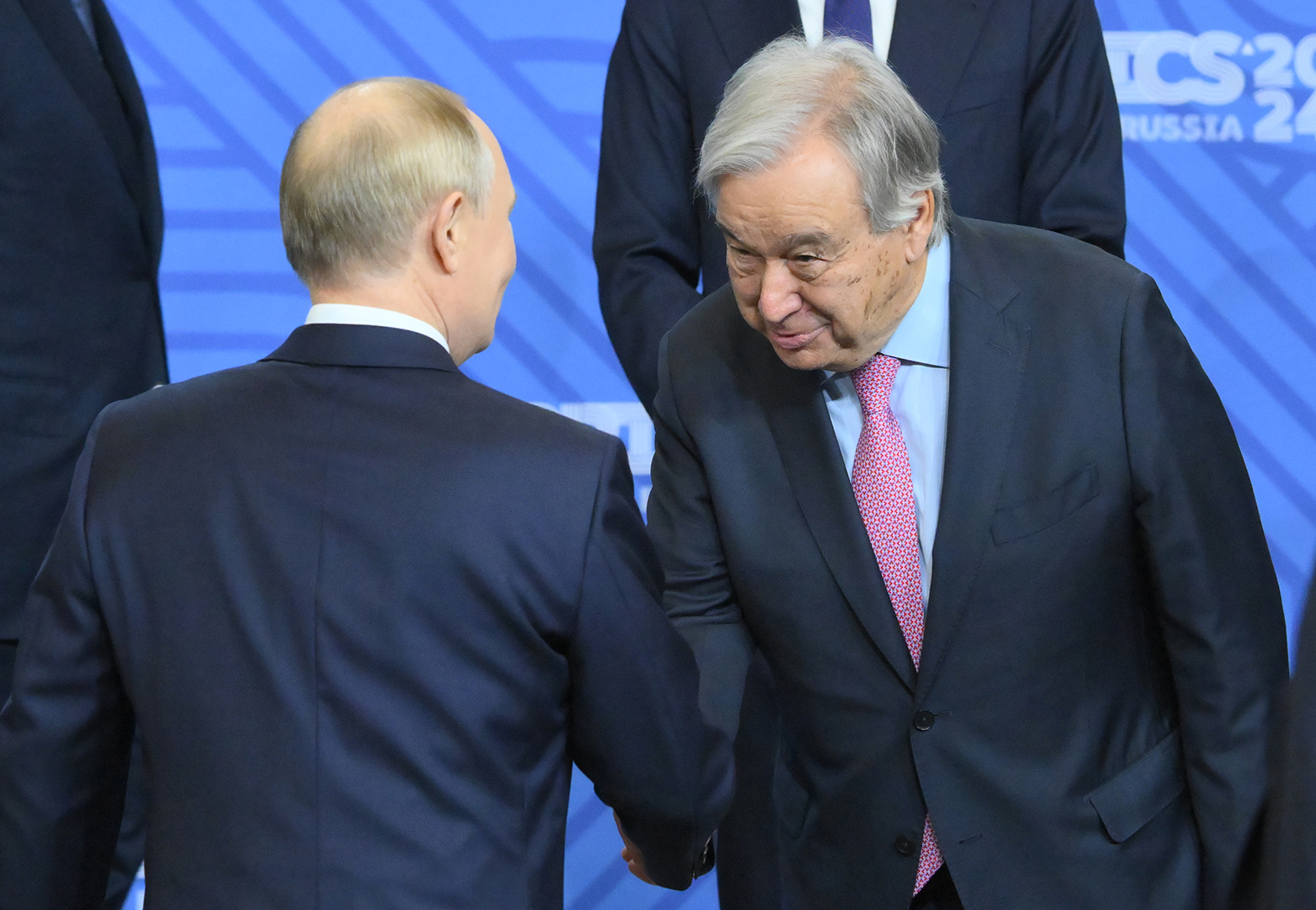
Russian President Vladimir Putin and UN Secretary-General Antonio Guterres

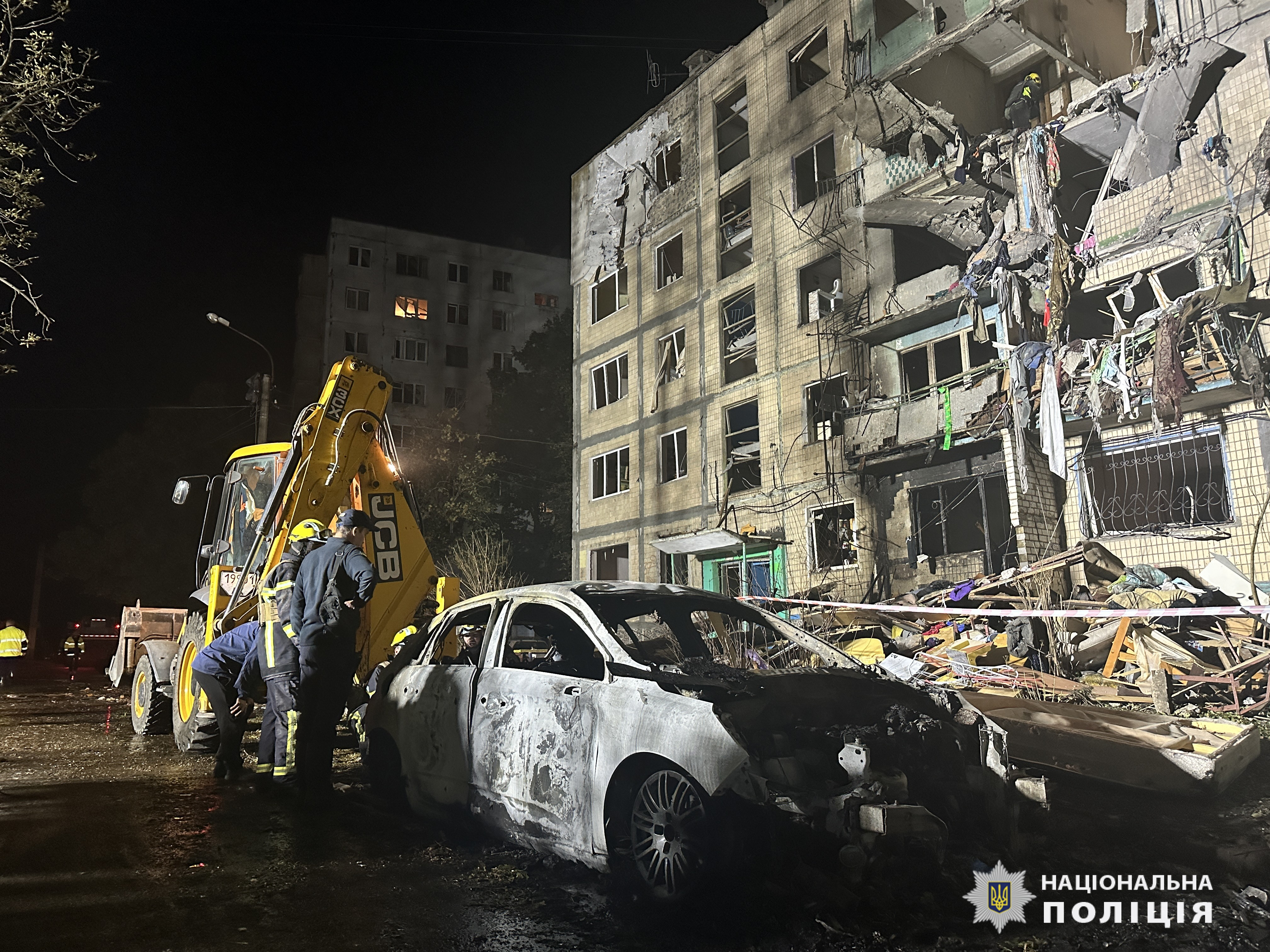
Kharkiv, Ukraine after the Russian attack on 2 October 2024. The Kazan Declaration emphasized adherence to the UN Charter and supported diplomatic efforts to end the war in Ukraine.

The summit sparked significant controversy, particularly surrounding UN Secretary-General António Guterres’s meeting with Russian President Vladimir Putin. Critics, including political scientist Alexander J. Motyl in his article published on The Hill, argue that Guterres’s cordial interaction with Putin, whom the International Criminal Court has charged with war crimes, undermines the moral authority of the United Nations. Motyl and others contend that Guterres’s actions implicitly endorse Putin's aggression in Ukraine, weakening both the UN’s credibility and its position on global justice. Ukrainian journalist Ihor Petrenko echoes this sentiment, condemning Guterres for failing to challenge Putin’s dismissive rhetoric regarding the war. In contrast, scholars like Bahauddin Foizee defend Guterres's engagement with controversial leaders as necessary for maintaining diplomatic channels and fostering peace. Foizee suggests that excluding Russia from international discussions could hinder the UN's broader peace efforts. Meanwhile, Lithuanian leaders, including Prime Minister Ingrida Šimonytė and Foreign Minister Gabrielius Landsbergis, criticized Guterres for perceived moral inconsistency, noting his attendance at the BRICS summit with Putin and Belarusian President Lukashenko despite not attending a Ukraine-focused peace summit in Switzerland earlier. This, they argued, damages Guterres credibility as an impartial mediator. This debate highlights the complex balance between moral leadership and pragmatic diplomacy in a divided global landscape. (Note: Following Guterres warmly shaking Vladimir Putin's hand during the BRICS summit on 24 October 2024 in Kazan, Volodymyr Zelenskyy refused to meet with Guterres in Kyiv with the Ministry of Foreign Affairs of Ukraine releasing the statement: "This is a wrong choice that does not advance the cause of peace. It only damages the UN's reputation." and adding "The UN secretary general declined Ukraine's invitation to the first Global Peace Summit in Switzerland. He did, however, accept the invitation to Kazan from war criminal Putin." Putin has been a fugitive since 17 March 2023 when the International Criminal Court (ICC) issued arrest warrant following an investigation of war crimes, crimes against humanity and genocide by Putin during the Russo-Ukrainian War.)

== See also ==
- 2023 Russia–Africa Summit
- 2024 G20 Rio de Janeiro summit
