= The Lighthouse, Colombo =

Bungalow in Sri Lanka

The Lighthouse is a large bungalow (as mansions are referred to locally) in Colombo, Sri Lanka. At present it is owned by the Sri Lankan Government and houses the Lakshman Kadirgamar Institute of International Relations and Strategic Studies.

Located in the Cinnamon Gardens a suburb of Colombo, it was built by D. D. Pedris, contemporaneity style with a mixture of early twentieth century Ceylon architecture and British colonial architecture. It was acquired by the British Board of Trade in 1933 and was home to the Imperial Lighthouse Service of Ceylon and Minicoy until 1976, when it along with all of the lighthouses run by the Imperial Lighthouse Service was transferred to the Sri Lanka Navy. Since the Navy came under the overview of the Ministry of External Affairs and Defence, when the ministry was split in 1977 the house was transferred to the Ministry of Foreign Affairs.

Since then it has been used for many functions, including serving as the official residence of then Lt Col Ranjan Wijeratne, Minister of Foreign Affairs until his assassination. Since 2006 it has been used for the Lakshman Kadirgamar Institute of International Relations and Strategic Studies.
