= LBO (disambiguation) =

LBO may stand for:

- Floyd W. Jones Lebanon Airport (FAA LID: LBO), an airport in Laclede County, Missouri, U.S.
- Lanka Business Online, an online news publisher in Sri Lanka
- Left Business Observer, an economics newsletter published by Doug Henwood
- Leveraged buyout, a method of acquiring a company
- Lithium triborate (LiB_{3}O_{5}), a non-linear optics crystal
- Landing Barge, Oiler a World War 2 ship.
- Long Beach Opera, an American opera company in southern California
- Loughborough railway station, Leicestershire, England, National Rail station code
- LBO Ladies Bowling Tour, sponsored by Daigaku Honyaku Center
  - DHC Ladies Bowling Tour
