= Sri Lanka Foreign Service =

The Sri Lanka Foreign Service (SLFS) (Sinhala: ශ්‍රී ලංකා විදේශ සේවය; śrī laṁkā vidēśa sēvaya) is the body of career diplomats of Sri Lanka. The Permanent Secretary of the Ministry of Foreign Affairs is also the head of the foreign service.

== History ==
Established on 1 October 1949 after the independence of Ceylon in 1948 as the Ceylon Overseas Service with the recruitment of its first batch of cadets. The service was dealt with foreign affairs, as opposed to the older Ceylon Civil Service, which dealt with domestic affairs. Following Sri Lanka becoming a republic in 1972 the service changed its name to Sri Lanka Overseas Service.

== Selection and training ==
Members to the foreign service are selected every few years after an exam carried out by the Department of Examinations. The select recruits undergo training at the Bandaranaike International Diplomatic Training Institute and the Sri Lanka Institute of Development Administration.

== Secretary to the Ministry of Foreign Affairs ==
- Ms. Aruni Ranaraja (19 November 2024 - to date)
- Ms. Aruni Wijewardane (20 May 2022 – 19 November 2024)
- Admiral Prof. Jayanath Colombage (14 August 2020 - 20 May 2022)
- Mr. Ravinatha Aryasinha (31 Oct 2018 – 14 August 2020)
- Mr. Prasad_Kariyawasam (16 Aug 2017 – )
- Mr. Esala Weerakoon (1 Aug 2016 – )
- Ms. Chitranganee Wagiswara (19 Jan 2015 – )
- Ms. Kshenuka Senewiratne (Jan 2014 – )

== Positions ==
At the Ministry of Foreign Affairs

- Secretary to the Ministry of Foreign Affairs (Appointed by the President)
- Additional Secretary (Appointed by the Public Service Commission)
- Director General (Grade I)
- Director (Grade II/Grade III)
- Deputy Director (Grade III)
- Assistant Secretary (Grade III - entry level)
- At a Diplomatic mission:
- Ambassador//High Commissioner /Permanent Representative in UN (PRUN) (Grade I)
- Deputy Chief of Mission/Deputy High Commissioner (Grade II)
- Minister (Grade II)
- Minister-counselor (Grade II)
- Counselor (Grade II)
- First Secretary (Grade III)
- Second Secretary (Grade III -conformation of service)
- Third Secretary (Grade III - entry level, probation)
- At a consulate:
- Consul General (Grade II)
- Consul (Grade III)
- Vice Consul (Grade III)

== Criticism ==
The Sri Lanka Foreign Service has been underutilized by the politicization of the Service, with appointments from outside the Service to Sri Lanka Missions abroad becoming the norm. This has resulted in the degradation of the implementation of the foreign policy of Sri Lanka.

Allegations of fraud and misuse of public money has also been levelled at some of those who have been appointed.

Due to the sporadic recruitment to the Sri Lanka Foreign Service, other Public Sector officers are also appointed to diplomatic posts, with several attempts made in the past to amalgamate the Sri Lanka Foreign Service with the Sri Lanka Administrative Service.

== Former notable members of the SLOS ==
- Asoka Girihagama
- Vernon Mendis
- Bernard Tilakaratna
- Wilhelm Woutersz
- H. M. G. S. Palihakkara
- Jayantha Dhanapala
- Susantha De Alwis
- Yogendra Duraiswamy

== See also ==
- Ministry of External Affairs
- Public Services of Sri Lanka
- Sri Lanka Administrative Service
- Ambassadors and High Commissioners of Sri Lanka
- Sri Lankan Non Career Diplomats
- List of diplomatic missions in Sri Lanka
- Diplomatic missions of Sri Lanka
- Foreign relations of Sri Lanka
