= Permanent Representative of Sri Lanka to the United Nations =

- Emblem of Sri Lanka
- Incumbent; Jayantha Jayasuriya since June 5, 2025
- Ministry of Foreign Affairs
- Style: His Excellency
- Reports to: President of Sri Lanka; Minister of Foreign Affairs
- Seat: United Nations; New York City, New York
- Nominator: The president of Sri Lanka
- Term length: No fixed term
- Inaugural holder: Sir Senerat Gunewardene
- Formation: February 28, 1956; 70 years ago
- Website: un.int/srilanka

The permanent representative of Sri Lanka to the United Nations is Sri Lanka's foremost diplomatic representative to the United Nations, and in charge of the country's mission to the UN. The position of permanent representative is equivalent in rank to an ambassador, and entitles them to use the style His/Her Excellency.

The current permanent representative is Jayantha Jayasuriya.

== List of heads of mission ==
1. Sir Senerat Gunewardene, KBE (1956–1958)
2. Sir Claude Corea, KBE (1958–1961)
3. Prof Gunapala Mallalasekera (1961–1963)
4. Sir Senerat Gunewardene, KBE (1963–1965)
5. Merenna Francis de Silva Jayaratne (1965–1967)
6. Hamilton Shirley Amerasinghe (1967–1978)
7. Biyagamage Jayasena Fernando (1978–1980)
8. Ignatius Benedict Fonseka (1980–1984)
9. Nissanka Wijewardane (1984–1987)
10. Daya Perera (1988–1991)
11. Stanley Kalpage (1991–1994)
12. Herman Leonard de Silva (1995–1998)
13. John de Saram (1998–2002)
14. Chithambaranathan Mahendran (2002–2004)
15. Bernard Goonetilleke (2004–2005)
16. Prasad Kariyawasam (2005–2008)
17. H. M. G. S. Palihakkara (2008–2009)
18. Palitha Kohona (2009–2015)
19. A. Rohan Perera (2015–2018)
20. A.L.A. Azeez (2018–2020)
21. Mohan Peiris (2021–2024)
22. Jayantha Jayasuriya (2025–present)
