= H. M. G. S. Palihakkara =

Sri Lankan civil servant, diplomat (born 1947)

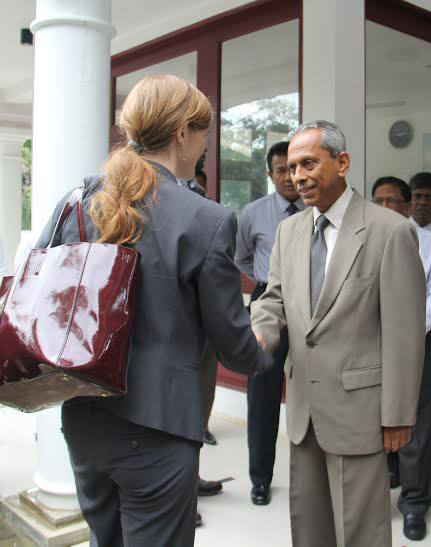
- Palihakkara (right) meets Samantha Power in 2015

4th Governor of Northern Province
- In office 27 January 2015 – 16 February 2016
- Preceded by: G. A. Chandrasiri
- Succeeded by: Reginald Cooray

Permanent Representative of Sri Lanka to the United Nations
- In office August 2008 – August 2009
- Preceded by: Prasad Kariyawasam
- Succeeded by: Palitha Kohona

Sri Lankan Ambassador to Thailand
- In office 2001–2004

Personal details
- Born: 1947 (age 78–79)
- Education: University of Ceylon, Peradeniya
- Profession: Civil servant
- Ethnicity: Sinhalese

Hewa Matara Gamage Siripala Palihakkara (born 1947) is a Sri Lankan civil servant, diplomat and former Governor of Northern Province.

== Early life and family ==
Palihakkara was born in 1947. After school he joined the University of Ceylon, Peradeniya from where he graduated with a Bachelor of Education degree.

Palihakkara is married and has one child. He is a Buddhist and is from Matara.

== Career ==
Palihakkara joined the Sri Lanka Overseas Service (the foreign service) in 1979, receiving training in Australia in 1980. He then studied international human rights and humanitarian law at the Raul Wallenberg Institute, Lund University.

Palihakkara was Sri Lanka’s Permanent Representative to the United Nations Office at Geneva and an officer at Sri Lanka's UN Mission in New York. He was ambassador to Thailand from 2001 to 2004 (also accredited to Cambodia, Laos and Vietnam). He was also Sri Lanka's Permanent Representative to the United Nations Economic and Social Commission for Asia and the Pacific. He was appointed Foreign Secretary on 20 April 2004, retiring on 31 December 2006. He served as Director General of government's Peace Secretariat at the same time (he had been deputy chief of the secretariat before being appointed foreign secretary).

Palihakkara was appointed Permanent Representative of Sri Lanka to the United Nations in August 2008, serving until August 2009. During the bitter fighting in the final months of the Sri Lankan Civil War Palihakkara defended the Sri Lankan military at the United Nations Security Council, denying that they had fired heavy weapons into the "No Fire Zone".

In May 2010 President Mahinda Rajapaksa appointed Palihakkara a member of the Lessons Learnt and Reconciliation Commission. Palihakkara appointment was criticised because, as Sri Lanka's Permanent Representative to the United Nations, he represented the government and defended the actions of the Sri Lankan military during the final months of the civil war when both sides of the conflict are alleged to have committed war crimes.

Newly elected President Maithripala Sirisena appointed Palihakkara Governor of Northern Province on 27 January 2015. He resigned in February 2016.

Political offices
Preceded by G. A. Chandrasiri	Governor of Northern Province; 2015–2016	Succeeded by Reginald Cooray
