= Yogendra Duraiswamy =

Sri Lankan diplomat

Yogendra Duraiswamy, SLOS (1923 – 17 June 1999) was a Sri Lankan diplomat, who served in India, Myanmar, the United States (New York), Australia, Iraq, Italy, China and the Philippines.

== Early life and education ==
He was born in 1923 in Jaffna to Sir Waithilingam Duraiswamy, a speaker of the State Council of Ceylon. Duraiswamy was educated at Jaffna Central College, Jaffna Hindu College and at the Royal College, Colombo. He entered the University of Ceylon in 1944 and graduated with an Honours Degree in Economics.

== Diplomatic career ==
In 1949 Duraiswamy joined the newly formed Ceylon Overseas Service in the first batch of six cadets, along with Vernon Mendis, through a highly competitive examination and selection process. His first overseas appointment was in New Delhi, to which he later returned as Secretary in charge of Public Relations. He opened the Sri Lankan consulate in Chennai.

During his career he served in the Ceylon's embassies in Rangoon, Canberra, Baghdad, Rome, Beijing and Manila. He was the Official Secretary of the Ceylon Mission to the United Nations in New York from 1956 to 1959, when he gained recognition as the spokesman for the Afro Asian Group. In 1970 he was the representative of Ceylon at the Sessions of the UN General Assembly. Duraiswamy participated in the 1st Summit of the Non-Aligned Movement in Belgrade, SFR Yugoslavia in 1961.

He had served as Ceylon's Head of Embassy or Charge d'affairs in Iraq, Italy and the Philippines. In Manila, he was conferred the Ancient Order of Sikatuna in recognition of his exceptional contribution to strengthening relations between Sri Lanka and the Philippines.

In 1975 Duraiswamy retired prematurely. In 1979 President J.R. Jayewardene appointed him as District Secretary (Government Agent) of Jaffna that then included the Kilinochchi District. During his tenure of two years he implemented many infrastructure and employment generation development projects. He later served as a lecturer at the Bandaranaike International Diplomatic Training Institute and participated in civic initiatives to help resolve the ethnic conflict in Sri Lanka and assist the war-affected population. He was active in the Hindu Council which supported grass-roots development interventions in Hindu villages in the Amparai, Batticaloa, Mannar, Trincomalee and Vavuniya districts.

== Family ==
His wife Sivanandini Duraiswamy was the President of the Hindu Women's Society (Saiva Mangaiyar Kalagam) until 2022 and is involved in several educational and development initiatives in Sri Lanka. She was also the Chairperson of the Sri Lanka Women's Conference until 2022. His only son, Dr. Naresha Duraiswamy is a Senior Operations Officer at the World Bank
