= Cabinet Office (Sri Lanka) =

Government department

Agency overview
- Formed: 1947
- Jurisdiction: Government of Sri Lanka
- Headquarters: Republic Building, Colombo
- Agency executive: W. M. D. J. Fernando, Cabinet Secretary
- Website: www.cabinetoffice.gov.lk

The Cabinet Office is a department of the Government of Sri Lanka responsible for supporting the Cabinet of Sri Lanka in its policy formulation process. The department was formed in 1947 when the first cabinet of the Dominion of Ceylon was formed, headed by The Rt Hon D.S. Senanayake, first Prime Minister of Ceylon. Headquarters for the office were located at the Republic Building, Colombo until 2022, when they moved to Lloyd's Building. The head of the Cabinet Office is the Cabinet Secretary.

The first Cabinet Secretary was T. D. Perera, who concurrently held the post of Deputy Secretary to the Treasury. Administration was handled by the Assistant Secretary Bernard Peiris, who functioned as de facto Secretary until his appointment as Cabinet Secretary, thus becoming the third person to hold theoffice. The current Cabinet Secretary is W.M.D.J Fernando, who has held the post since August 2020.

== List of Cabinet Secretaries ==
- Theodore Duncan Perera (1947–1951) (concurrent Deputy Secretary to the Treasury)
- A G Ranasinghe (1951–1954) (concurrent Secretary to the Treasury)
- Bernard Peiris (1954–1963)
- D.G. Dayarathne (1963–1970)
- M.S. Alif (1970–1977)
- G.V.P. Samarasinghe (1977–1979)
- M.A.G. Perera (1979–1992)
- R. Abeyrathne (1992–1996)
- Dharmasena Wijesinghe (1996–2001)
- N.V.K.K. Weragoda (2001–2004)
- Dharmasena Wijesinghe (2004–2009)
- Sumith Abeysinghe (2009–2019)
- Sirisena Amarasekara (2019–2020)
- W. M. D. J. Fernando (2020–Present)

== See also ==
- Cabinet of Sri Lanka
- Presidential Secretariat
