= Kalpage =

Kalpage is a surname. Notable people with the surname include:

- Ruwan Kalpage (born 1970), Sri Lankan cricketer
- Stanley Kalpage (died 2000), Sri Lankan academic and statesman
