= Nissanka =

Nissanka is a given name and surname. Notable people with the name include:

== Given name ==
- Nissanka Malla of Polonnaruwa (c. 1157–1196), Sinhalese king
- Nissanka Wijewardane (1925–2019), Sri Lankan civil servant
- Nissanka Wijeyeratne (1924–2007), Sri Lankan politician

== Surname ==
- Herbert Sri Nissanka (1898–1954), Ceylonese lawyer
- K. W. T. Nissanka (1971–1993), Sri Lankan army officer
- Pathum Nissanka (born 1998), Sri Lankan cricketer
- Prabath Nissanka (born 1980), Sri Lankan cricketer
- Sandun Wijemanne Nissanka (born 1998), Sri Lankan-American record industry executive

== See also ==
- Nissanka Latha Mandapaya, structure in Sri Lanka
