= Republic Building, Colombo =

Republic Building
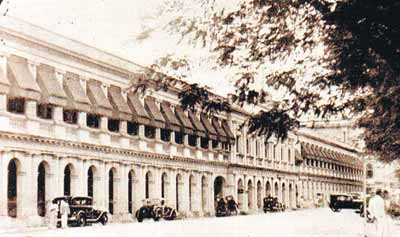
- Republic Building
- Interactive map of the Republic Building area

General information
- Location: Colombo, Sri Lanka
- Coordinates: 6.93685°N 79.84352°E
- Client: Government of Sri Lanka

The Republic Building is the building that houses the Ministry of Foreign Affairs in southern wing and the Cabinet Office in its northern wing. It is located in Colombo Fort in close proximity to the President's House, and it was known as the Senate Building until 1972.

== Building ==
The building was built during the British colonial era to house the Legislative Council of Ceylon, which was located there until January 29, 1930, when a new building, now called the Old Parliament Building, was built to house the Legislative Council. From then until Ceylon's Independence in 1948, the Republic Building housed several government departments. Following independence, the building hosted the Senate of Ceylon, the Prime Minister's Office, the Cabinet office and the Ministry of External Affairs and Defence. It was renamed the Republic Building in 1972 when Sri Lanka became a republic.

Since 1977, it was used by the Ministry of Foreign Affairs after the Ministry of External Affairs and Defence was split and the Ministry of Defence moved to Echelon square.

== Republic Square ==
The Republic Building is situated along what was once Queen's Street facing the Gordon Gardens across the road. At the northern end of the building, Queen's Street met Church Street. The section of the road between the Church Street juncture and the Sir Baron Jayathilaka Mawatha Street juncture has been closed off and has since been known as Republic Square. The square is off-limits to the public for security reasons.

== See also ==
- General Treasury Building
