= Wilhelm Woutersz =

Sri Lankan diplomat and civil servant (1939–2003)

Thelmuth Harris Wilhelm Woutersz (19 July 1939 - 16 November 2003) was a prominent Sri Lankan diplomat and civil servant, who served as the Permanent Secretary to the Ministry of Foreign Affairs of Sri Lanka. He had served as Sri Lankan Ambassador to People’s Republic of China, Italy & Yugoslavia.

== Education ==
Wilhelm Woutersz was educated at the Royal College Colombo. He then pursued further studies at the University of Ceylon, Peradeniya graduating in 1961 with Bachelor of Arts in English literature, western classics and European history.

== Diplomatic career ==
For a short while after graduating, he joined the tutorial staff of S. Thomas' College, Mt Lavinia before joining the Ceylon Civil Service in 1962 and transferred to the Ceylon Overseas Service in 1965.

After joining the Foreign Service he served in India, Germany, Pakistan and Bangladesh before being appointed Ambassador to Yugoslavia (1986–1991) where he was the Dean of the Diplomatic Corps. Thereafter he was posted as ambassador to the People’s Republic of China (1993–1997) with concurrent accreditation as ambassador to Mongolia. Having served as director of various divisions and a Director General in the Foreign Ministry, he was appointed to the post of Permanent Secretary of the Ministry of Foreign Affairs (known as Foreign Secretary) in 1997 and held the post till 1999, in this capacity he served as the head of the Foreign Service.

In 1999 he was sent as Sri Lanka’s ambassador in Italy and the Holy See and was concurrently ambassador to Greece and high commissioner to Cyprus and Malta. During his tenure he had been Sri Lanka’s accredited permanent representative to the UN’s Food and Agriculture Organization (FAO), the World Food Programme (WFP), and the International Fund for Agricultural Development (IFAD) and had served as the chairman of the Group of 77 (G77) Conference as chairman of the Rome Chapter from 1999 to 2002. In 2003 upon his return after completing his tenure, he retired from the Foreign Service. Wilhelm would serve as president of the Dutch Burgher Union of Ceylon until suffering from a debilitating stroke and die with his wife Desiree Frederick Rita Hills at his bedside.
