= Asoka Girihagama =

Current Sri Lankan Ambassador to Canada

Sri Lankan High Commissioner To Canada
- In office November 2018 – December 2021
- Succeeded by: Harsha Navaratne

Sri Lankan Ambassador to the Sultanate of Oman
- In office August 2011 – July 2014
- Preceded by: D.M.M Ranaraja

Sri Lankan Deputy High Commissioner to Australia
- In office June 2005 – August 2008

Personal details
- Born: October 21, 1958 Madukanda, Sri Lanka
- Spouse: Sudharma Kumarihami Girihagama (m.1993)
- Children: Thiyara Ransini Girihagama
- Parent(s): Abeysinghe Banda and Nandawathie Kumarihamy Girihagama
- Education: Anuradhapura Central-Anuradhapura; Sri Jayawardena Pura University; University of Colombo; Jaffna University
- Profession: Civil Servant

Asoka Girihagama, Madukande Asoka Kumara Girihagama, is the former Sri Lankan Ambassador to Canada. Prior to the appointment he was the Ambassador to Oman and a Director General for the Sri Lanka Overseas Service.
