= Theodore Duncan Perera =

Ceylonese civil servant

Theodore Duncan Perera, CMG (born 28 May 1895) was a Ceylonese civil servant who served as the Secretary of the Treasury from December 1950 to March 1951 and Deputy High Commissioner for Ceylon in the United Kingdom.

Graduated with an LL.B. from the University of London, Perera joined the Ceylon Civil Service in August 1919. Following his cadetship in Kurunagala and Jaffna, he served the early part of his career as a police magistrate in several locations of the island. Perera served as the Assistant Controller of Stamps and Assistant Colonial Secretary in the 1920's and in 1931 he was appointed as the Secretary to the first Minister of Agriculture and Lands, D. S. Senanayake. He became the first Cabinet Secretary in 1947, while concurrently serving as the Deputy Secretary to the Treasury and was appointed a Companion of the Order of St Michael and St George (CMG) in the 1948 Birthday Honours. He served as the Secretary of the Treasury from December 1950 to March 1951. In May 1953, he was appointed Deputy High Commissioner for Ceylon in the United Kingdom, serving till 1956 and on occasions served as the acting High Commissioner.
