= W. T. Jayasinghe =

Sri Lankan civil servant

Wijepala Tudor Jayasinghe was a Sri Lankan civil servant. He was the former Permanent Secretary of Defence and Foreign Affairs from 1972 to 1977 and first Secretary of the Ministry of Foreign Affairs from 1977 to 1989.

Educated at Trinity College, Kandy and at the University of Ceylon, Jayasinghe briefly taught art at Trinity College before joinging the Ceylon Civil Service, going on to serve as the Controller of Immigration and Emigration until he was appointed as secretary to the Ministry of External Affairs and Defence.
