= Susantha De Alwis =

Sri Lankan diplomat

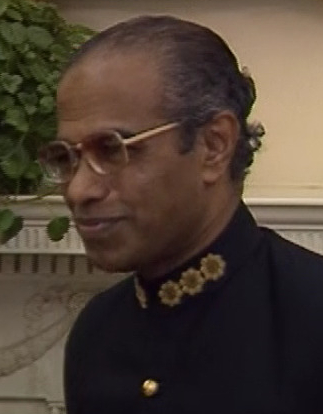
- De Alwis in 1986

Sri Lanka Ambassador to the United States
- In office 1986–1992

Sri Lanka Ambassador to Japan and South Korea
- In office 1980–1983

Sri Lanka Ambassador to the United Nations (Geneva)
- In office 1974–1978

Susantha De Alwis (died 22 December 2008) was a Sri Lankan diplomat, the former Sri Lankan Ambassador to the United States, Japan, South Korea and former Permanent Representative to United Nations (Geneva).

Educated at the Royal College, Colombo where he won many prizes including the Governor's Scholarship, De Abrew Memorial Scholarship, Principal's Distinctions Prize and the Best Speaker's Prize. He entered the University of Ceylon, Peradeniya, where he was the President of the Law Society and General Secretary, Arunachalam Hall. After graduating with an LL.B. degree, he joined the Ceylon Overseas Service. Later he gained a scholarship to the University of Oxford to read for a BLitt degree in International Laws at Keble College, Oxford. He was a barrister-at-law from Gray's Inn.

During his career in the foreign service De Alwis has served as Assistant High Commissioner for Ceylon in Madras (1962–66); Chargé d'Affaires of the Ceylon's Embassy in Indonesia; First Secretary of Ceylon's embassy in Washington DC (1970–74). In 1974 he was appointed as Sri Lankan Permanent Representative to the United Nations in Geneva, a post he held till 1978. In 1973 he was a signatory of Intelsat. In 1978, he was chairman of the Co-ordinating Bureau of Non-Aligned Countries. From 1980 to 1983 he served as Sri Lankan Ambassador to Japan and South Korea and Ambassador for Sri Lanka in the United States from 1986 to 1992. In 1987, he was elected chairman of the International Telecommunications Satellite Organization.

His brothers Dunstan De Alwis was a lawyer and President's Counsel and Dr Stanmore De Alwis a Thoracic Surgeon. Of his sisters eldest Sushila De Silva was a teacher at Yashodara Balika, Borella, Dr Thelma Gunawardene was the former Director of the Colombo National Museum and Dr Daisy Jayawickrema former Medical Officer, CPC. He was married to Achala and had two daughters, Chamini, Darshini and a son Ruvan. He died at his home in Bambalapitiya on 22 December 2008.

== External links and references ==
Diplomatic posts
Preceded by ?	Sri Lankan Ambassador to United States	Succeeded by ?
Preceded by ?	Sri Lankan Ambassador to Japan and South Korea	Succeeded by ?
Preceded by ?	Sri Lankan Permanent Representative to the United Nations (Geneva)	Succeeded by ?
