= Ministry of External Affairs and Defence =

Ministry in Ceylon

The Ministry of External Affairs and Defence was a cabinet ministry of the Government of Ceylon that conducted and managed all of Ceylon's relations with other countries and its military matters from 1947 to 1977.

== History ==
The ministry was formally established in 1948 following the independence of Ceylon as the Ministry of External Affairs and Defence, coming under the direct control of the Prime Minister of Ceylon. In 1977, J.R Jayawardena's government adapted two separate ministries, forming the Ministry of Defence and the Ministry of Foreign Affairs.

== Senior officials ==
- Prime Minister and Minister of External Affairs and Defence
- Parliamentary Secretary for External Affairs and Defence
- Permanent Secretary of the Ministry of External Affairs and Defence

== Departments ==
- Ceylon Army
- Royal Ceylon Navy
- Royal Ceylon Air Force
- Police Department
- Ceylon Overseas Service
- Department of Information
- Department of Immigration and Emigration

== Parliamentary Secretaries ==
- Hon. Richard Gotabhaya Senanayake (1947–1952)
- Hon. Major Montague "Monti" Jayawickreme (1952–1956)
- Hon. Tikiri Banda Subasinghe (1956–1959)
- Hon. Felix R. Dias Bandaranaike (1960–1964)
- Hon. J. R. Jayewardene (1965–1970)
- Hon. Lakshman Jayakody (1970–1972)

== Deputy Ministers ==
- Hon. Lakshman Jayakody (1972–1977)
- Hon. T. B. Werapitiya (1977–1981)

== Permanent Secretaries ==
The following list of Ceylon Civil Service Class 1 officers who held the post of Permanent Secretary to the Ministry of Defence and External Affairs:

- Sir Kanthiah Vaithianathan (1948-1952)
- Sir Velupillai Coomaraswamy (1952-1954)
- Gunasena de Soyza (1954-1957)
- Herbert Tennekoon (1957-1959)
- Merenna Francis de Silva Jayaratne (1959-1961)
- N. Q. Dias (1961–1965)
- G.V.P. Samarasinghe (1965–1970)
- A. R. Ratnavale (1970–1972)
- W. T. Jayasinghe (1972–1977)

=== Additional Secretaries ===
Incomplete

- S.A. Dissanayake – (former IGP)
- Tissa Wijeyeratne

== See also ==
- Minister of Foreign Affairs (Sri Lanka)
- Minister of Defence (Sri Lanka)
- Minister for Internal Security (Ceylon)
- Diplomatic missions of Sri Lanka
