= Palitha Kohona =

Sri Lankan-Australian diplomat

Palitha T. B. Kohona, a Sri Lankan born diplomat, was the former Permanent Representative of Sri Lanka to the United Nations (UN). Until August 2009, he was the Permanent Secretary to the Ministry of Foreign Affairs of the Government of Sri Lanka and was the former Secretary-General of the Secretariat for Coordinating the Peace Process. He was also a member of the Government delegation at the talks held in February and October 2006 Geneva, Switzerland with the LTTE. He also led the Government delegation to Oslo for talks with the LTTE. He is the current ambassador of Sri Lanka to China. He is a citizen of both Sri Lanka and Australia.

== Early life and education ==
Kohona, who hails from Matale, He received his primary education and secondary education in Sri Lanka at St Thomas' College, Mount Lavinia. He obtained an LL.B. (Hons) at the University of Sri Lanka, LL.M. from the Australian National University on International Trade Law and a Doctorate from Cambridge University, UK, for the thesis 'The Regulation of International Trade through Law,' subsequently published by Kluwer, Netherlands. He is also an Attorney-at-Law, Supreme Court of Sri Lanka.

== Diplomatic career ==
Kohona was the Secretary, Ministry of Foreign Affairs of Sri Lanka from 2006 to 2009. Kohona was the Permanent Representative of Sri Lanka to the United Nations in New York from 2009 to 2015. During this period he was elected as the Chair of the UN GA Sixth Committee (Legal) in 2013. He was the Co Chair of the UN Working Group on Biological Diversity Beyond National Jurisdiction, and Chair of the UN Committee on Israeli Practices in the Occupied Arab Territories. He was a member of the delegation to the UN General Assembly in 2006 and 2008. He has led official level delegations to a range of countries on bilateral and multilateral matters. Previously he was the Secretary-General of the Government Peace Secretariat (2006) during which time he participated in two rounds of peace negotiations with the LTTE in Geneva and led the delegation to a round organised in Oslo.

== United Nations ==
Prior to that he was the Chief of the United Nations Treaty Section in New York from 1995 to 2006. At the UN he was responsible for introducing major managerial innovations and was awarded the UN 21 PIN for superior performance and efficiency. He managed the computerisation of the UN treaty database which contains over one million pages of information and which now receives over 1.5 million hits per month from around the world. The UN treaty collection consists of over 50,000 bilateral treaties registered with the UN Secretariat and over 500 multilateral treaties deposited with the UN Secretary-General covering the spectrum of international interaction. The hand books pertaining to the treaty practice of the Secretary-General were prepared under his guidance. He also initiated the UN treaty training programme as part of an outreach programme for familiaring countries with the UN treaty collection. He also initiated the UN Treaty Event, now held during the opening of the General Assembly in September, which has become a regular feature in the UN calendar. The Treaty Event established a temporary office for the Treaty Section in the Kuwaiti Boat Room (lobby of the General Assembly) to facilitate heads of state signing select treaties as they entered the UN. Given his proactive approach to UN reform, he was assigned to the results based budgeting spearhead group and to a range of other groups working on Secretariat reform.

== Australia ==
Prior to joining the UN, Kohona was with the Department of Foreign Affairs and Trade of Australia. His last position there was as head of the Trade and Investment Section of the Department. Previously he was assigned to the Uruguay Round negotiating team of Australia with specific responsibility for the institutional mechanism and the dispute settlement unit. In 1989 he was posted to the Australian Permanent Mission in Geneva with specific responsibility for environmental issues. In Geneva he chaired the negotiating group that developed the compliance mechanism under the Montreal Protocol to the Convention on the Ozone Layer and was a member of the Working Group on the liability mechanism under the Basel Convention on Hazardous Wastes. In 1988 Kohona led the Australian delegation to the UNCTAD Trade and Development Board.

He returned to Sri Lanka on the invitation of President Mahinda Rajapakse and served as the Secretary General of the Secretariat for Coordinating the Peace Process (SCOPP) from April 2006 until January 2007.

== Positions held ==
- Ambassador and Permanent Representative to the UN in New York, 2009 - 2015.
- Chair, UN GA Sixth Committee (Legal), 2013
- Co Chair, UN Working Group on Biological Diversity Beyond National Jurisdiction, 2010 - 2015

Chair, UN Committee on Israeli Practices in the Occupied Territories, 2010 - 2015

- Special Advisor to the President on the Peace Process and Secretary-General of the Secretariat for Coordinating the Peace Process (SCOPP), April 2006 - January 2007.
- Member of the Sri Lankan delegation to the UN GA, 2006 - 2014
- Leader of the UN legal delegation to North Korea at the invitation of the DPRK Government in 2005.
- Patron – Renewable Energy and International Law
- Patron – Making Art Everywhere
- Advisory Board, Temple of the Tooth Relic, Kandy, 2016
- Chief of the United Nations Treaty Section, New York, 1995 - 2006.
- In 1992 he was attached to the Uruguay Round of Trade Negotiations institutional mechanisms and dispute settlement unit and headed the Trade and Investment Section of the Department in Australia under the GATT/WTO.
- In 1989–92 chaired the negotiating group that developed the compliance mechanism under the Montreal Protocol to the Convention on the Ozone Layer in Geneva and was a member of the Working Group on the liability mechanism under the Basel Convention on Hazardous Wastes.
- 1989 posted to the Australian Permanent Mission to the UN in Geneva
- In 1988 led the Australian delegation to the UNCTAD Trade and Development Board
- Participated in a series of bilateral and multilateral negotiations on aviation matters, trade relations, investment protection, fisheries matters and later led some of the delegations.
- Treaty Section of the Ministry
- Department of Foreign Affairs and Trade of Australia since 1983.

== See also ==
- Ministry of Foreign Affairs (Sri Lanka)
- List of Sri Lankan non-career Permanent Secretaries
- Sri Lankan Non Career Diplomats
