= Stanley Kalpage =

Sri Lankan academic and statesmen (died 2000)

Deshamanya Felix Stanley Christopher Perera Kalpage (died 2000) was a Sri Lankan academic and statesman. He was a member of the Senate of Ceylon, the Permanent Secretary of the Ministry of Higher Education, Sri Lanka’s High Commissioner to India (1989–1991) and its Permanent Representative to the UN (1991–1994).

Educated at S. Thomas' College, Mount Lavinia, he graduated from the University of Ceylon with a degree in chemistry and gained a PhD in Agricultural Chemistry from the University of London.

Joining the University of Ceylon as a lecturer, he went on to head the department of agricultural chemistry. In 1965 he was appointed to the Senate, when Dudley Senanayake was Prime Minister. From 1974 to 1977 he served as Professor of Soil Science at the University of Malaya.

Returning to Sri Lanka in 1977, he was appointed as Permanent Secretary of the newly formed Ministry of Higher Education. Soon after he was appointed as the first Chairman of the University Grants Commission and served in this capacity till 1989. During this time Ruhuna University College and Batticaloa University College were established and upgraded to university status.

In 1989, he was appointed as the Sri Lankan High Commissioner to India and from 1991 to 1994 he served as the Permanent Representative of Sri Lanka to the United Nations. In 1993 Kalpage was awarded the title Deshamanya from the Government of Sri Lanka. He was married to Chitranganie, and had two sons, Sanjay and Pravin.

== See also ==
- List of Sri Lankan non-career diplomats
- List of Sri Lankan non-career Permanent Secretaries
