= Nissanka Wijewardane =

Sri Lankan civil servant and diplomat (1925–2019)

Deshamanya Nissanka Wijewardane (21 October 1925 - 9 May 2019) was a former Sri Lankan civil servant and diplomat. He was the former Permanent Representative of Sri Lanka to the United Nations.

Having graduated from the University of Ceylon, he joined the Ceylon Civil Service having come second in the civil service entrance exam in 1949. He served as a cadet in the Department of Imports and Exports under N. U. Jayawardena; Trincomalee Kachcheri; Galle Kachcheri; Kandy Kachcheri; Department of Land Commissioner and the Department Control of Imports and Exports. He was appointed Additional Assistant Government Agent, Colombo District in March 1951; Deputy Controller of Immigration and Emigration in 1952 and Assistant Secretary, Ministry of Local Government in December 1953. Thereafter he served in the Public Service Commission, Assistant Director of Immigration, Government Agent, Badulla and Kandy. In 1967, he was appointed Secretary to the Governor General of Ceylon, William Gopallawa and served till 1970 and retired from the civil service in 1972. Moving into the private sector, he worked as the general manager of Walker Sons and Company. From 1977 to 1984, he was chairman of the Bank of Ceylon. In 1984, he was appointed Permanent Representative of Sri Lanka to the United Nations and concurrent accreditation as Sri Lankan Ambassador to Brazil. From 1989 to 1991 he served as Director General of the Greater Colombo Economic Commission and thereafter served as chairmen of Janashakthi insurance till 2005. He was awarded the title of Deshamanya by the government of Sri Lanka in 1992.

== See also ==
- Sri Lankan Non Career Diplomats
