= Bandaranaike International Diplomatic Training Institute =

Sri Lanka Overseas Service training institute based in Colombo

Bandaranaike International Diplomatic Training Institute (BIDTI) is the institute in Colombo where Sri Lanka Overseas Service officers are trained. The Institute functions under Lakshman Kadirgamar Institute of International Relations and Strategic Studies, with itself coming under the Ministry of Foreign Affairs, Government of Sri Lanka. Its current Director-General is Pamela J Deen and it is situated within the grounds of the Bandaranaike Memorial International Conference Hall (BMICH) in Colombo.

Established 1994 with veteran diplomat Dr Vernon Mendis as its funding director-general, the BIDTI was designed in the first instance to provide a training programme to recruits to the Sri Lanka Overseas Service. Later it broaden its training programs to cover diplomacy and international relations, currently these causes are also open to the public too. Under the Sri Lanka Institute of Strategic Studies (Amendment) Act No. 32 of 2006 the BIDTI was vested in the Lakshman Kadirgamar Institute of International Relations and Strategic Studies (LKIIRSS) and was deemed to function as the training arm of the institute.
