= G.V.P. Samarasinghe =

G.V.P. Samarasinghe, CCS was a Sri Lankan civil servant. He was the former Permanent Secretary of Defence and Foreign Affairs and Cabinet Secretary. Educated at the Royal College, Colombo, he is a graduate from the University College, Colombo.
