= Aruni Wijewardane =

Sri Lankan diplomat

Hon. Aruni Wijewardane
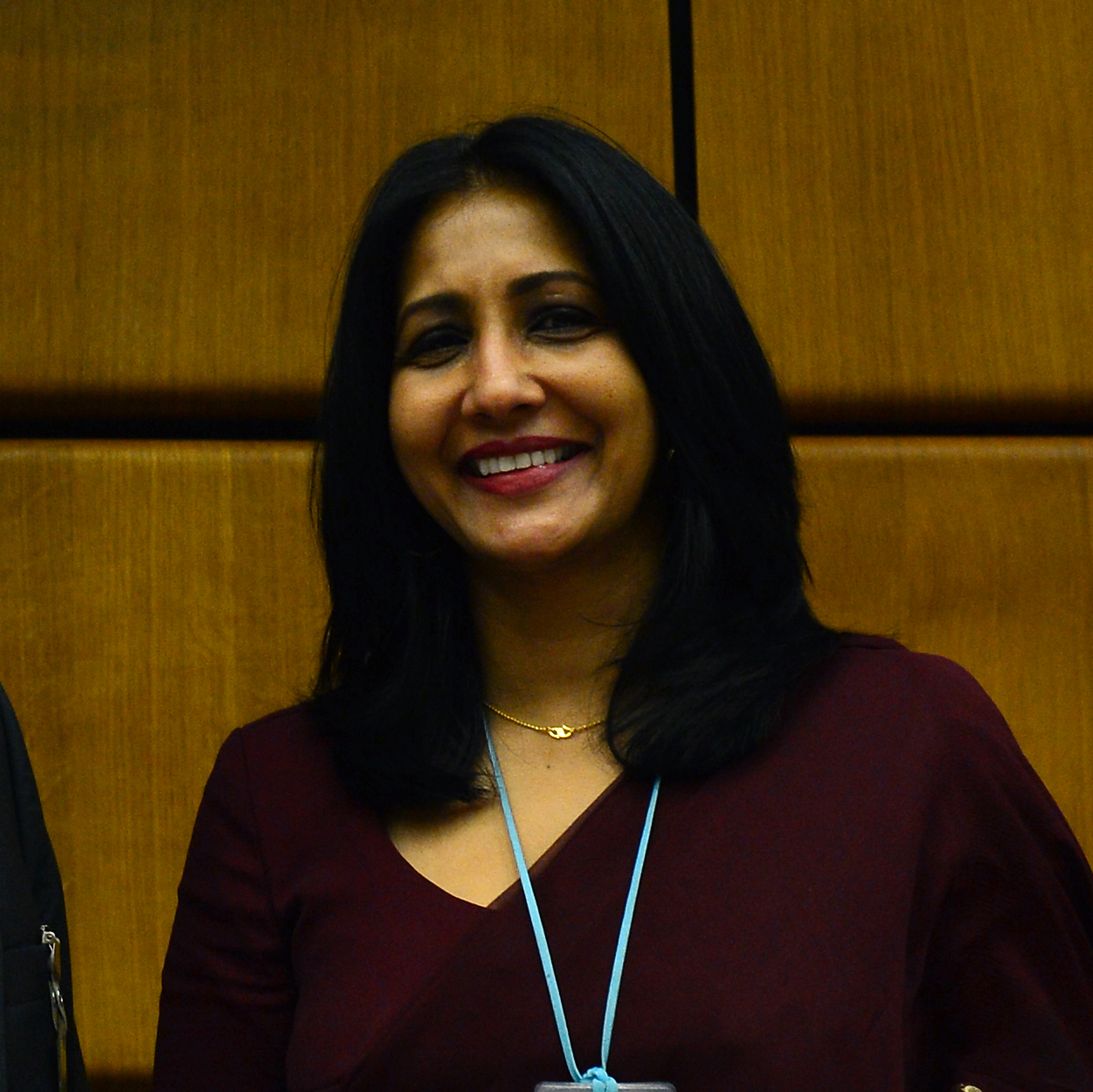

Foreign Secretary of Sri Lanka
- In office 20 May 2022 – 19 November 2024
- President: Gotabaya Rajapaksa; Ranil Wickremesinghe; Anura Kumara Dissanayake
- Prime Minister: Ranil Wickremesinghe; Dinesh Gunawardena; Harini Amarasuriya
- Preceded by: Jayanath Colombage
- Succeeded by: Aruni Ranaraja

Personal details
- Born: Sri Lanka
- Education: University of Cambridge, University of Colombo, University of Western Australia
- Occupation: Diplomat, UN Civil Servant

Aruni Yasodha Wijewardane is a Sri Lankan diplomat who served as the Foreign Secretary of Sri Lanka from 2022 to 2024. Previously she served in several senior positions in the Ministry of Foreign Affairs of Sri Lanka, as well as overseas. From 2005 to 2008 she served as Ambassador of Sri Lanka to Austria and Permanent Representative to the International Organizations in Vienna. In addition to her career at the Ministry of Foreign Affairs, she also served as an international civil servant, as Director of the Secretariat of the Policy Making Organs of the International Atomic Energy Agency (IAEA) from 2013 to 2020.

== Education ==
Wijewardane holds an MPhil degree from the University of Cambridge, where she was a Chevening Scholar. She also holds a master's degree from the University of Colombo and a bachelor's degree from the University of Western Australia. She speaks Sinhalese, English, French, and German. She attended secondary school at Ladies' College Colombo.

== Career ==
Wijewardane has served as a career diplomat with the Sri Lankan Ministry of Foreign Affairs since 1988.

In her early career, Wijewardane's diplomatic postings overseas included to the Permanent Mission of Sri Lanka to the United Nations, Geneva; Deputy Chief of Mission, Embassy of Sri Lanka, Philippines; Deputy High Commissioner, Sri Lanka High Commission, Malaysia. She also held several positions in the Ministry of Foreign Affairs in Colombo.

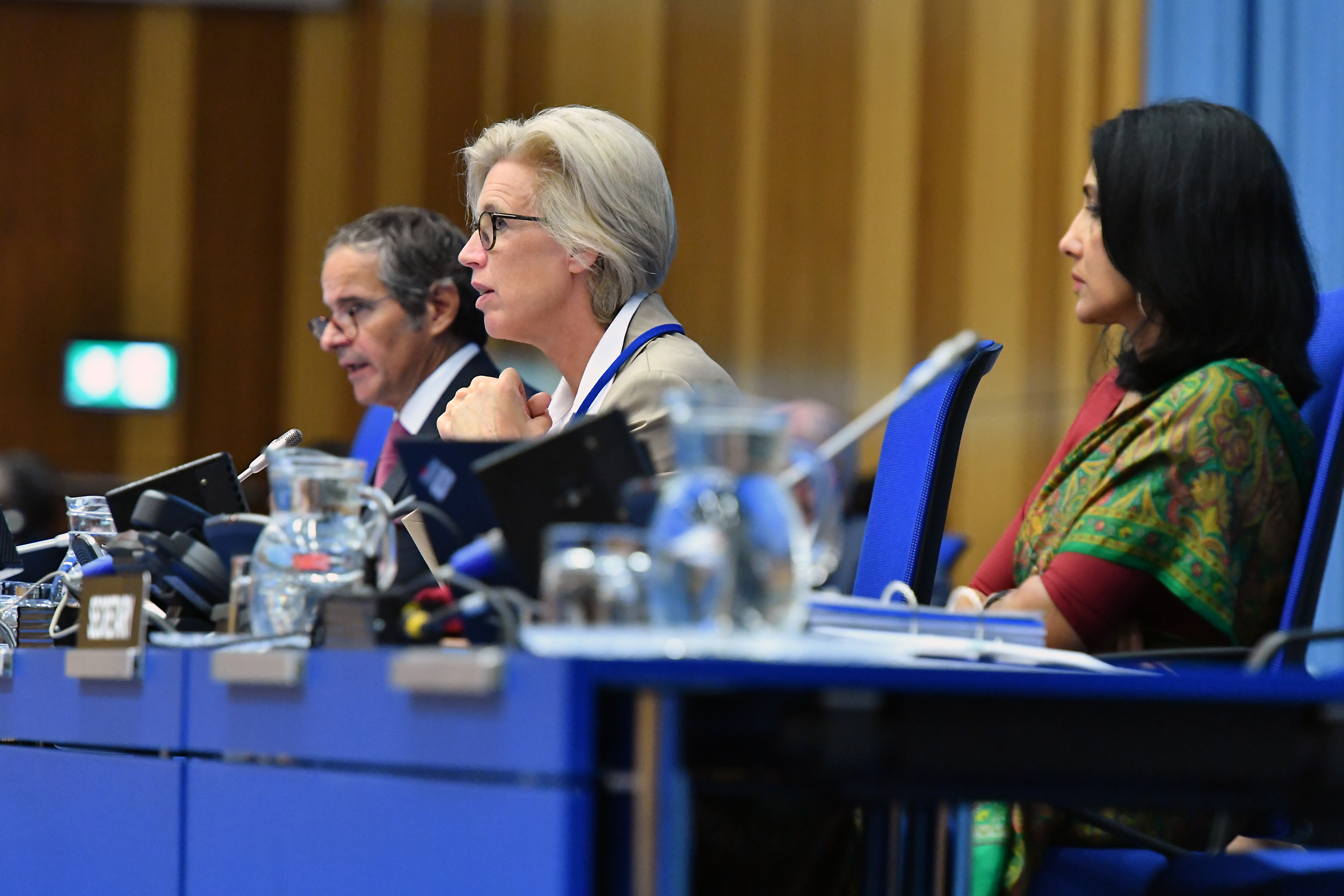
Aruni Wijewardane and Director General Rafael Grossi at the IAEA 1555th Board of Governors meeting. IAEA, Vienna, Austria. 14 September 2020

From 2005 to 2008 Wijewardane served as Ambassador of Sri Lanka to Austria and Permanent Representative to the International Organisations, where she also held the position of Governor for Sri Lanka on the IAEA Board of Governors.

From 2011 to 2013, she was Director of the International Organizations and Nonproliferation Program at the James Martin Center for Nonproliferation Studies (CNS), Middlebury Institute of International Studies in Monterey, California.

From 2013 to 2020, Wijewardane served as Secretary of the Policy Making Organs of International Atomic Energy Agency (IAEA).

On 20 May 2022, Wijewardane was appointed as the Foreign Secretary of Sri Lanka. She served in that Capacity until she was succeeded by Aruni Ranaraja in November 2024.
