= Lanka Business Online =

- Available in: English
- Owners: Lanka Business Online (Private) Limited
- Website: lankabusinessonline.com
- Launched: 1998; 28 years ago
- Current status: Active

Lanka Business Online (also commonly shortened LBO) is an online business news publisher based in Colombo, Sri Lanka. Founded in 1998, it is currently one of the most popular English-language online business news website in Sri Lanka. The website was founded by Lakshaman Bandaranayake, and is currently owned by Lanka Business Online (Private) Limited.

== See also ==
- Daily FT
