= Jayanath Colombage =

Sri Lankan admiral

Admiral Jayanath Colombage RSP, VSV, USP, FNI
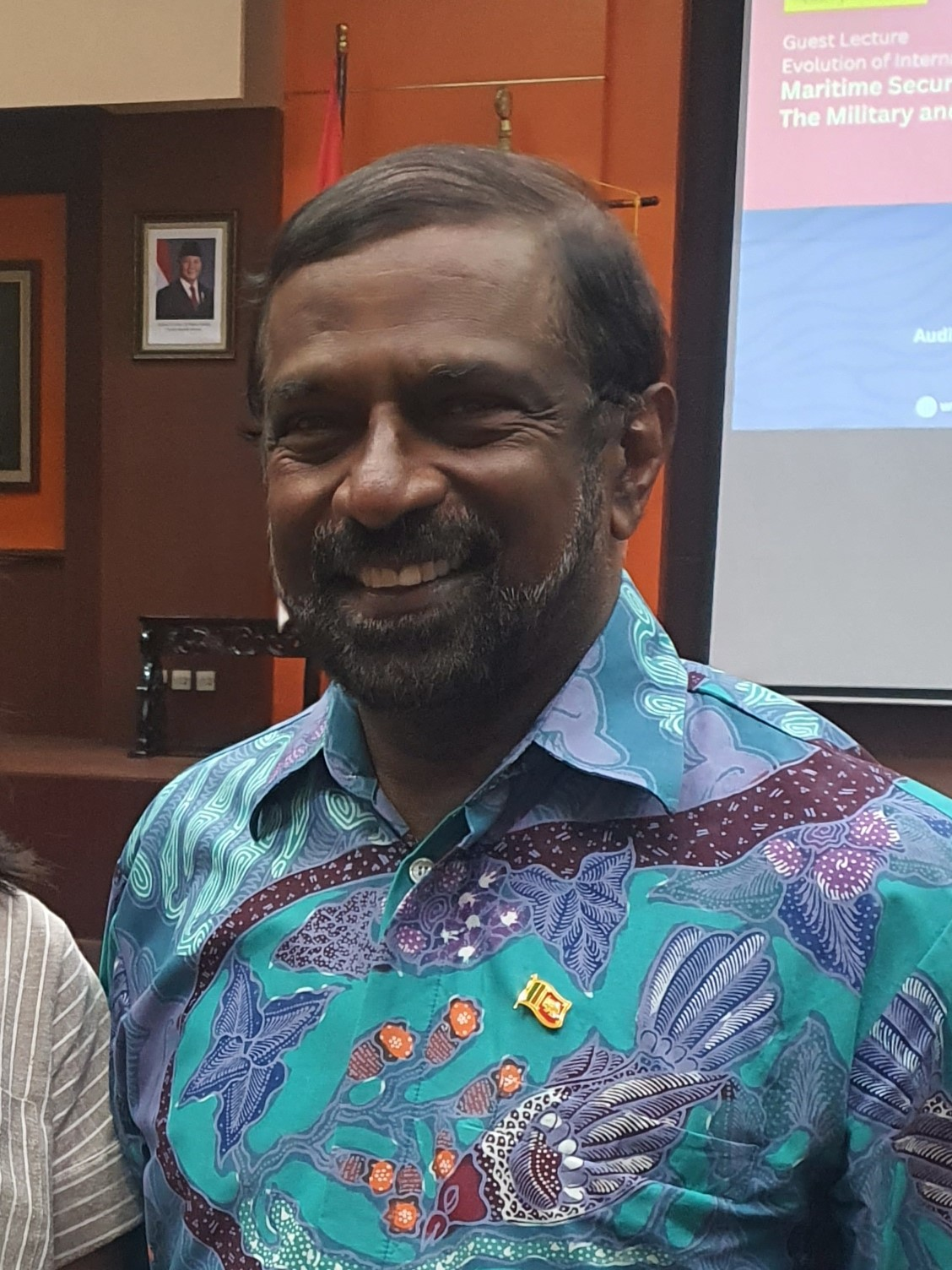
- Born: 14 October 1957 (age 69)
- Spouse: Srima Colombage
- Military career
- Allegiance: Sri Lanka
- Branch: Sri Lanka Navy
- Service years: 1978–2014
- Rank: Admiral
- Service number: NRX 0135
- Commands: Commander of the Sri Lankan Navy
- Conflicts: Sri Lankan Civil War
- Awards: Rana Sura Padakkama; Vishista Seva Vibhushanaya; Uttama Seva Padakkama
- Other work: Permanent Secretary of the Ministry of Foreign Affairs

Admiral Jayanath Colombage, RSP, VSV, USP, FNI is a Sri Lankan flag officer and diplomat. He was the Secretary of the Ministry of Foreign Affairs (Foreign Secretary) until 2022, prior to which he served as Additional Secretary to the President for foreign relations. A career naval officer, he had served as the Commander of the Sri Lankan Navy, the professional head of the navy from September 2012 to June 2014.

== Early life and education ==
Educated at St. Sylvester's College, Kandy, Colombage was an athlete, captaining the college athletic team from 1976 to 1978, winning college colours and Sri Lanka Schools Colours for athletics. He was a Senior Prefect and Lance Sergeant of the College Cadet Platoon. Colombage holds a Master of Science in Defence Studies from the University of Madras, a Master of Arts in International Studies from King's College London and a PhD from General Sir John Kotelawala Defence University. His thesis was titled ''Asymmetric Warfare a Sea''. He has gained Diplomas in Security Studies, Conflict Resolution, International Affairs and Information Technology. He is a Fellow of the Nautical Institute and has served as the Chairman of the Sri Lanka Branch.

== Naval career ==
Colombage joined the Sri Lanka Navy as an Officer Cadet in 1978 and successfully completed his basic training at the Naval and Maritime Academy in Trincomalee winning the ‘Sword of Honour’ for the Best Officer Cadet of the 7th Intake. He was then selected to attend the International Midshipmen Course at the Britannia Royal Naval College in Dartmouth. On his return, he was commissioned a Sub Lieutenant in the executive branch. Having served in many capacities at sea, he has commanded several types ships of the Sri Lanka Navy including Fast Missile Vessels, Fast Gun Boats, Fast Attack Craft and amphibious ships and has been awarded the Surface Warfare Badge. He is a weapon specialist who has undergone extensive training with the Indian Navy and in the People's Republic of China. He has attended the Defence Services Staff College, Wellington, the Asia-Pacific Center for Security Studies and the Royal College of Defence Studies.

He has commanded four Operational Naval Commands, Eastern, Northern, Western and North Central, for a period of over 5 years. He served twice as the Director General Operations at Naval Headquarters. Prior to that, he served as the Director General Services as well as the Director Naval Training and Personnel. He has also served in the appointments of Deputy Area Commander (North Central), Deputy Area Commander (South) and Deputy Area Commander (East). He became the second officer to be appointed as Commander of the Navy from Operational Naval Command, having served as Commander, Eastern Naval Area prior to his appointment as Commander of the Navy promotion to the rank of Vice Admiral in 2012. He retired from the navy in 2014 and was promoted to the rank of Admiral.

Colombage has been a regular lecturer at the Defence Services Command and Staff College. Specializing in maritime security, he has published several papers at national seminars. He has been certified by the International Maritime Organization as a lecturer in International Conventions on Port and Ship Security. He has published a book titled ‘Naval Terms and Expressions’ and actively contributes to various academic forums.

Continuing his athletic career after joining the navy, Colombage has won Navy Colours. He held the post of President of the Sri Lanka Navy Athletics Club from 1999 to 2006 and also served as President of the Ceylonese Track and Field Club, President of the Sri Lanka Navy Sports Board and a Vice President of the Defence Services Sports Board.

== Later work ==
Following his retirement from the navy, Colombage worked as the Director for Indo-Sri Lanka initiatives and law of the sea centers at the Pathfinder Foundation, a Colombo-based think tank. In December 2019, he was appointed the Additional Secretary to the President of Sri Lanka for foreign relations. In February 2020, he was appointed Director General of the Institute of National Security Studies of Sri Lanka. In August 2020, he was appointed Permanent Secretary of the Ministry of Foreign Affairs.

== Honors ==
He is a recipient of the Rana Sura Padakkama for gallantry. Among the other medals awarded to him are the Vishista Seva Vibhushanaya, the Uttama Seva Padakkama, the Sri Lanka Navy 50th Anniversary Medal, the Sri Lanka Armed Services Long Service Medal, the President's Inauguration Medal, the 50th Independence Anniversary Commemoration Medal, the Eastern Humanitarian Operations Medal, the Northern Humanitarian Operations Medal, the North and East Operations Medal, the Purna Bhumi Padakkama, the Vadamarachchi Operation Medal and the Riviresa Campaign Services Medal. He has been awarded ‘Letters of Commendation’ from several Commanders of the Navy and is the recipient of the 5-Star Commendation Badge.

Rana Sura Padakkama	Vishista Seva Vibhushanaya	Uttama Seva Padakkama	Sri Lanka Navy 50th Anniversary Medal
Sri Lanka Armed Services Long Service Medal	President's Inauguration Medal	50th Independence Anniversary Commemoration Medal	Eastern Humanitarian Operations Medal
Northern Humanitarian Operations Medal	North and East Operations Medal	Purna Bhumi Padakkama	Vadamarachchi Operation Medal
Riviresa Campaign Services Medal

== See also ==
- List of Sri Lankan non-career Permanent Secretaries
- Sri Lankan Non Career Diplomats

Military offices
Preceded by D. W. A. S. Dissanayake	Commander of the Sri Lankan Navy; 2012-2014	Succeeded by Jayantha Perera
