= Ministry of Foreign Affairs (Sri Lanka) =

Government ministry of Sri Lanka

- විදේශ කටයුතු අමාත්‍යාංශය வெளிநாட்டலுவல்கள் அமைச்சு

Agency overview
- Formed: 1948
- Preceding agency: Ministry of External Affairs and Defence
- Jurisdiction: Government of Sri Lanka
- Headquarters: Republic Building, Colombo 1; 6.937517°N 79.844308°E
- Minister responsible: Vijitha Herath
- Deputy Minister responsible: Arun Hemachandra
- Agency executive: Aruni Ranaraja, Secretary to the Ministry
- Child agencies: Lakshman Kadirgamar Institute of International Relations and Strategic Studies; Bandaranaike International Diplomatic Training Institute
- Website: mfa.gov.lk

The Ministry of Foreign Affairs (Sinhala: විදේශ කටයුතු අමාත්‍යාංශය Vidhesha Katayuthu Amathyanshaya; Tamil: வெளிநாட்டலுவல்கள் அமைச்சு) (also known as the Foreign Ministry or External Affairs Ministry) is a cabinet ministry of the Government of Sri Lanka responsible for conducting and managing Sri Lanka's foreign relations through oversight of its missions abroad via the Sri Lanka Overseas Service, as well as drafting and general implementation of the nation's foreign policy.

== History ==
The ministry was formally established in 1948 following the independence of Ceylon as the Ministry of External Affairs and Defence, coming under the direct control of the Prime Minister of Ceylon. In 1977 the government led by J.R Jayawardena divided the ministry in two, forming the Ministry of Defence and the Ministry of External Affairs. A.C.S Hameed was appointed as the first minister of External Affairs on 23 July 1977.

== Overseas missions ==
The ministry has 65 overseas missions including 13 High Commissions, a Deputy High Commission, 37 Embassies, 2 Permanent Representations to the United Nations, 11 consulates and a representative office. It provides consular assistance to Sri Lankans traveling, working and studying overseas.

== Divisions ==
- General Administration Division
- Overseas Administration Division
- Consular Affairs Division
- Protocol Division
- Public Diplomacy Division
- Economic Affairs Division
- Finance Division
- IT Division
- Legal Division
- United Nations and Multilateral Affairs Division
- South Asia and SAARC Division
- Middle East and Africa Division
- Europe, Americas and CIS Division
- East Asia and Pacific Division

== Secretaries to the Ministry of Foreign Affairs ==
Informally referred to as the Foreign Secretary.

- W. T. Jayasinghe, SLAS (1977-1989)
- Bernard Tilakaratna, SLOS (1989-1994)
- Rodney Vandergert, SLOS (1994-1997)
- Wilhelm Woutersz, SLOS (1997-1999)
- Lionel Fernando, SLAS
- G. Wijesiri, SLOS
- Nihal Rodrigo, SLOS
- B. A. B. Goonetilleke, SLOS
- H. M. G. S. Palihakkara, SLOS
- Dr. Palitha T.B. Kohona
- Karunatilaka Amunugama, SLOS
- Kshenuka Seneviratne, SLOS
- Esala Weerakoon, SLOS
- Prasad Kariyawasam, SLOS
- Ravinatha Aryasinha, SLOS
- Jayanath Colombage, SLOS
- Aruni Wijewardane
- Aruni Ranaraja

== See also ==
- Foreign relations of Sri Lanka
- Ministries of Sri Lanka
