= List of Nalanda College Colombo alumni =

This is a list of Old Nalandians, alumni of Nalanda College Colombo, Sri Lanka.

== Politicians ==
=== National ===
Name	Notability	Reference
Mahinda Rajapaksa	President of Sri Lanka (2005-2015), Prime Minister of Sri Lanka (2004-2005, 2018, 2019-2022)	
Chathuranga Abeysinghe	Deputy Minister of Industry and Entrepreneurship Development, Member of Parliament - Colombo (2024-present), Executive Member NPP	
Chandima Hettiaratchi	Member of Parliament - Kalutara (2024-present)	
Sujith Sanjaya Perera	Member of Parliament - Kegalle (2015–present)	
Nimal Siripala de Silva	Member of Parliament - Badulla (1994–present), Leader of the Opposition (Sri Lanka) (2015), Leader of the House (2005-2015), Cabinet Minister of Justice, Human Rights and Legal Reforms (2015-2020), Cabinet Minister of Labour (2020-current)	
Mangala Samaraweera	Minister of Finance (2017 to 2019), Minister of Foreign Affairs (2005 to 2007 and 2015 to 2017), Member of Parliament Matara (1989 - 2020),	
Sarath Weerasekara	Member of Parliament - Colombo (2020-current), Member of Parliament - Ampara (2010-2015), State Minister of Provincial Councils and Local Government (2020-2024)	
Sisira Jayakody	Member of Parliament - Gampaha (2015–present), State Minister of Indigenous Medicine, Rural and Ayurveda Hospital Development and Community Health (2020-2024)	
Rajitha Senaratne	Minister of Health, Nutrition and Indigenous Medicine (2015–2020) Member of Parliament - Kalutara (1994–2024)	
Anura Priyadharshana Yapa	Member of Parliament - Kurunegala (1994–present), State Minister for Trade and Consumer Affairs (2015-2024)	
Chandima Weerakkody	Deputy speaker and chairman of committees of the Parliament of Sri Lanka (2010-2015), Member of Parliament - Galle (2009–2024)	
Gamini Jayawickrama Perera	Member of Parliament - Kurunegala (2015–2020), Cabinet Minister of Sustainable Development and Wildlife and Minister of Buddha Sasana (2015-2020), Chief Minister of North Western Province, Sri Lanka (1987-1993)	
Thilanga Sumathipala	Deputy speaker and chairman of committees of the Parliament of Sri Lanka (2010-2015) Member of Parliament - Colombo (2010 to 2015) National List (2015-2020), Vice-chairman of the Sri Lanka Freedom party, State Minister for Technology and Innovation (2015-2020)	
I. M. R. A. Iriyagolla	Minister of Education (1965-1970)	
M. D. Banda	Minister of Food, Commerce and Trade (1965-1970), Member of Parliament - Maturata (1947-1960),	
Dharmasena Attygalle	Minister of Indigenous Medicine (1980-1982), Member of Parliament - Kesbewa (1972-1982); High Commissioner to Pakistan	
M. A. Adikari	Member of Parliament - Wariyapola (1956-1964)	
Lal Dharmapriya Gamage	Member of Parliament - Anuradhapura (1989-1994)	
Weerasinghe de Silva	Member of Parliament - Balapitiya (1970-1977) Member of Parliament - Galle District (1994–2000)	
Indradasa Hettiarachchi	Member of Parliament - Horana (1977-1989)	
Kamal Karunanayake	Member of Parliament - National List (1989-1994)	
Chandra Gunasekera	Member of Parliament - Kottawa (1970-1977)	
C. A. Dharmapala	Member of Parliament - Hakmana (1952-1960)	
Tissa Karalliyadde	Member of Parliament - Anuradhapura (1994–2020)	
Asoka Karunaratne	Member of Parliament - Rambukkana (1960-1970, 1977–1989)	
Rupa Karunathilake	Member of Parliament - Bentara-Elpitiya (1977-1989); Minister of Plantations; Ambassador to Netherlands	
Nirmala Kotalawala	Member of Parliament - Kalutara (2004–2020)	
H. R. Piyasiri	Member of Parliament - Matara (1989-1994); Ambassador to Myanmar	
Sarath Ranawaka	Member of Parliament - Kalutara (1989-2009)	
Maithripala Senanayake	Member of Parliament - Medawachchiya (1947-1989); Leader of the House (1970-1977); Governor of North Central Province (1994-1998)	
Wilfred Senanayake	Member of Parliament - Homagama (1970-1977)	
C. V. Velupillai	Member of Parliament - Talawakelle (1947-1953)	
Dingiri Bandara Welagedara	Member of Parliament - Kurunegala (1952-1956, 1965–1970, 1977–1988), Governor of North Central Province (1988-1989)	
Athula Wijesinghe	Chief Minister North Western Province (2002-2013)	
H. R. Wimalasiri	Member of Parliament - Matara (1994-2000)	

=== Provincial ===
Name	Notability	Reference
Prasanna Shamal Senarath	Provincial Councilor and Opposition Leader of North Western Province, Sri Lanka Council	
Udena Wijerathna	Provincial Councilor, Western Province	

== Religion ==
Name	Notability	Reference
Piyadassi Thera	Former Chief Incumbent of the Vajiraramaya Temple, Bambalapitiya, Former Sinhala Editor at the Buddhist Publication Society	
Aluthwewa Soratha Thera	Chancellor of Uva Wellassa University	
Ananda Weerasekara	Resident of Buddhangala Forest Hermitage	

== Academia ==
Name	Notability	Reference
Jayantha Lal Ratnasekera	Vice Chancellor of the Uva Wellassa University, Professor of Chemistry	
Ranjith Premalal De Silva	Vice Chancellor University of Vocational Technology, former Vice Chancellor - Uva Wellassa University	
Milinda Peiris	Vice Chancellor / Commandant - General Sir John Kotelawala Defence University	
Rahula Anura Attalage	Professor of Mechanical Engineering, Deputy Vice Chancellor - University of Moratuwa	
Mohan De Silva	Professor of Surgery, Dean of the Faculty of Medical Sciences - University of Sri Jayewardenepura	
K. N. O. Dharmadasa	former Professor of Linguistics, Dean of Faculty of Arts - University of Peradeniya	
Chandra Embuldeniya	former Vice Chancellor (Founder), Uva Wellassa University of Sri Lanka	
H. D. Gunawardhana	former Professor of Chemistry, Acting Vice Chancellor and Head of Chemistry Department - University of Colombo	
Abhaya Induruwa	Founder, Department of Computer Science & Engineering , University of Moratuwa, Inaugural Endowed Professor of Computing - University of Colombo School of Computing; Internet Hall of Fame Inductee - 2014	
S. D. Jayaratne	Professor of Medicine - University of Sri Jayewardenepura	
Kamal Karunanayake	former Professor and Dean of Economics Department - Kelaniya University	
Nandadasa Kodagoda	former Professor of Medicine, Vice Chancellor and Dean of Medical Faculty - University of Colombo	
Udaya Ranawaka	Senior lecturer in Neurology, Department of Medicine - University of Kelaniya	
Janaka Ruwanpura	Professor of Project Management Systems, Vice Provost International	
Nalin Samarasinha	Senior Scientist - Planetary Science Institute (PSI), Arizona, USA	
Suwanda H. J. Sugunasiri	former Professor (Adjunct) - University of Toronto Canada	
Mahinda Vilathgamuwa	Professor of Electrical Engineering and Computer Science, Queensland University of Technology, Australia	
Ranjith Laxman Wijayawardana	Senior Lecturer in Nuclear Physics - University of Peradeniya	
Ruchira Wijesena	Senior Lecturer at the Institute of Technology, University of Moratuwa, Doctor of Philosophy in Materials Chemistry, University of Colombo, alumnus of Nalanda College Colombo	

== Civil servants ==
Name	Notability	Reference
P. Amarasinghe	former Deputy Governor of the Central Bank, former Chairman of People's Bank	
Tissa Devendra	former Chairman of Public Service Commission, Chairman of Salaries Commission	
C. A. Dharmapala	former Permanent secretary to the Ministry of Defence and Security Advisor to President J. R. Jayewardene	
Saman Ediriweera	former Secretary Ministry of Tertiary Education and Training, Secretary Ministry of Posts and Telecommunications	
Hemasiri Fernando	Current secretary to the Ministry of Defence and chief of staff of the president, chairman of the Board of Investment of Sri Lanka, former secretary to the Ministry of Postal Services, former secretary to the prime minister, former chairman of Sri Lanka Telecom, People's Bank (Sri Lanka), and the Airport and Aviation Authority, former chairman National Olympic Committee of Sri Lanka, (also listed in Industry and commerce)	
V. C. Gunatilleke	PC - former Solicitor General, Attorney General's Department	
Abhaya Induruwa	former acting chairman and board member of the Computer and Information Technology Council (CINTEC), Board Member Natural Resources Energy and Science Authority (NARESA)	
Lincoln Perera	former Secretary of Ministry of Plantation Industries, former Chairman of Janatha Estates Development Board (JEDB)	
M. J. Perera	CCS – former Vice Chancellor of the University of Peradeniya, former Secretary Ministry of Education, first Ceylonese Director General of Radio Ceylon, founder Chairman of Rupavahini (TV) Corporation	
B. D. Rampala	CCS, MBE - former General Manager of the then Ceylon Government Railway (present Sri Lanka Railways), first Ceylonese Chief Mechanical Engineer of Ceylon Government Railway	
Ridgeway Thilakeratne	CCS - former Permanent Secretary to Ministry of Information and Broadcasting, former Chairman / Director General of Sri Lanka Broadcasting Corporation	
Ananda Weerasekara	former Vice Chairman of Airport and Aviation Services, former Director of Rehabilitation Services Prelates	
Prasanna Wickramasuriya	former Chairman of Airport and Aviation Services Sri Lanka, former Special Operations Platoon Commander, Sri Lanka Army	
Upawansa Yapa	PC - former Solicitor General, Attorney General's Department	

== Military ==
=== Army ===
Name	Notability	Reference
Piyal Abeysekera	Major-General; Deputy Chief of Staff (Sri Lanka Army)	
Prabath Dematanpitiya	Major-General; Chief of Staff (Sri Lanka Army) (2020–present)	
Prasad Edirisinghe	Major-General; Rector, General Sir John Kotelawala Defence University	
Donald Hewagama	Brigadier; Judge Advocate General (1967-1982)	
Amal Karunasekara	Major-General; Chief of Staff (Sri Lanka Army) (2017–2018); Commandant of the National Defence College, Sri Lanka	
Jeewaka Ruwan Kulatunga	Major-General; Commandant Defence Services Command and Staff College; Deputy Vice Chancellor - General Sir John Kotelawala Defence University	
Ubaya Madawela	Major-General; Chief of Staff (Sri Lanka Army) (2016-2017)	
Milinda Peiris	Major-General; Chief of Staff (Sri Lanka Army); Vice Chancellor / Commandant - General Sir John Kotelawala Defence University	
Samantha Sooriyabandara	Major-General; Commander 53 Division; Defence Attaché Sri Lankan Embassy (USA)	
Janaka Walgama	Major-General; Commander Security Forces (East); Commandant Defence Services Command and Staff College	
Ananda Weerasekara	Major-General; Commanding Officer - North Central Province	
Prasanna Wickramasuriya	Colonel; Commander 1st Gajaba Battalion; Chairman of Airport and Aviation Services	
Ajith Wickramasinghe	Major-General; Director General Supply and Transport (Sri Lanka Army)	

=== Navy ===
Name	Notability	Reference
H. R. Amaraweera	Rear Admiral; Director Operations (Sri Lanka Navy)	
Justin Jayasuriya	Rear Admiral; Commander of Eastern Naval Command	
Vijitha Meddegoda	Rear Admiral; Director Naval Budget	
Sarath Ratnakeerthi	Rear Admiral; Chief of Staff (Sri Lanka Navy)	
Sarath Weerasekara	Rear Admiral; Director General Civil Security Department	
Samantha Wimalathunga	Rear Admiral; Director Sri Lanka Coast Guard (2015–present)	

=== Air Force ===
Name	Notability	Reference
Gagan Bulathsinghala	Air Chief Marshall; Commander of the Air Force (2015-2016); Ambassador to Afghanistan	
Kapila Jayampathy	Air Chief Marshall; Commander of the Air Force (2016–2019); High Commissioner to Malaysia	
Sumangala Dias	Air Chief Marshall; Commander of the Air Force (2019–2020); High Commissioner to Italy	
Ruchira Samarasinghe	Air Vice Marshall; Director Civil Engineering	
Kapila Wanigasooriya	Air Vice Marshall; Director Welfare	
Chandana Welikala	Air Vice Marshall; Director Administration	
Prashantha De Silva	Air Vice Marshall; Director Inspection and Safety	
P. D. J. Kumarasiri	Air Vice Marshall; Director Aeronautical Engineering	
E. P. B. Liyanage	Air Vice Marshall; Director General Engineering; Director Investigation and Safety	
Buddhi Siriwardene	Air Commodore; Base commander Sri Lanka Air Force Base Katunayake	

== Police ==
Name	Notability	Reference
Deshabandu Tennakoon	36th Inspector General of Police (Sri Lanka) (2024-2024)	
Nilantha Jayawardena	Senior Deputy Inspector General of Police; Chief of State Intelligence Service (Sri Lanka)	
Sisira Mendis	Deputy Inspector General of Police; Chief of State Intelligence Service (Sri Lanka)	
Sumith Liyanage	Deputy Inspector General of Police (?-1996)	

== Diplomats ==
Name	Notability	Reference
Sumangala Dias	High Commissioner to Italy	
Kapila Jayampathy	High Commissioner to Malaysia	
Gagan Bulathsinghala	Ambassador to Afghanistan	
H. R. Piyasiri	former Ambassador to Myanmar	
Rupa Karunathilake	former Ambassador to Netherlands	
Dharmasena Attygalle	former High Commissioner to Pakistan	
Siri Perera	former High Commissioner to India	
A. S. P Liyanage	Ambassador for Qatar, former High Commissioner to Nigerian Republic	
Udayanga Weeratunga	former Ambassador to Russian Federation	
Jaliya Wickramasuriya	former Ambassador in Washington D.C., United States of America	

== Legal / Judiciary ==
Name	Notability	Reference
Priyantha Jayawardena	President's Counsel, Puisne Justice of the Supreme Court of Sri Lanka	
Sobitha Rajakaruna	Puisne Justice of the Supreme Court of Sri Lanka	
V. C. Gunatilleke	President's Counsel, Solicitor General of Sri Lanka (1977-1981)	
Upawansa Yapa	President's Counsel, Solicitor General of Sri Lanka (1996-1998)	
H. L. de Silva	President's Counsel, Permanent Representative of Sri Lanka to the United Nations	
T. B. Dissanayake	President's Counsel, former Commissioner of Assize	
Siri Perera	QC; High Commissioner to India	

== Industry and commerce ==
Name	Notability	Reference
Vinya Ariyaratne	President of Sri Lanka Medical Association, Executive Director of Sarvodaya, lecturer in Community Medicine Faculty of Medical Sciences University of Sri Jayewardenepura	
Mohan De Silva	Chairman of University Grants Commission, Sri Lanka	
Felix R de Zoysa	founding Chairman of Stafford Motor Ltd, Stafford International School and Atlas Hall; philanthropist	
Chandra Embuldeniya	President, National Chamber of Commerce of Sri Lanka, CEO Informatics Group of Companies	
Hemasiri Fernando	Chairman of People's Bank, Sri Lanka	
S. D. Jayaratne	Chairman of National Medicines Regulatory Authority, former chairman of Sri Jayawardenepura General Hospital, former chairman of State Pharmaceuticals Corporation of Sri Lanka and State Pharmaceuticals Manufacturing Corporation (SPMC)	
Dilan Jayawardane	co-founder and CTO of Scoopler, software engineer at Google	
A. S. P. Liyanage	Chairman of ASP Group of Companies	
Eastman Narangoda	Chairman of George Steuart Finance, former Chairman of Seylan Bank, former CEO and General Manager of National Savings Bank	
Yoga Perera	Chairman and managing director of Autoland, Director Airport and Aviation Services Ltd	
Thilanga Sumathipala	Chairman of Sri Lanka Cricket	
Chandima Weerakkody	former Chairman State Mortgage and Investment Bank	
Ranjith Laxman Wijayawardana	Chairman of Atomic Energy Authority (AEA) of Sri Lanka	

== Art ==
=== Authors ===
Name	Notability	Reference
Gunadasa Amarasekara	dental surgeon, writer, poet	
Anura C. Perera	science writer and author	
Siri Perera	"Siri Aiya" of Radio Ceylon	
Suwanda H. J. Sugunasiri	author of poetry in English	
Asoka Weerasinghe	Deputy High Commissioner for Sri Lanka in Canada; poet, co-founder of the Gloucester Spoken Art Series in Ottawa, Canada	

=== Artists ===
Name	Notability	Reference
Hiran Abeysekera	British theatre actor	
Kamal Deshapriya	actor, commentator	
Senesh Dissanaike Bandara	film director, television presenter	
Gamini Hettiarachchi	film/teledrama actor	
Niroshan Illeperuma	film and teledrama actor	
Dhamma Jagoda	theatre actor (English and Sinhala)	
Henry Jayasena	playwright, actor	
Bandu Munasinghe	first stunt director of the Sri Lankan Cinema	
G. D. L. Perera	actor, film director of the Sri Lankan Cinema	
Ravindra Rupasena	film actor of early Sinhala cinema in the 1950s	
Sisira Senaratne	singer	
Dhammika Siriwardana	film/teledrama producer, director	
Ananda Weerakoon	film actor of early Sinhala cinema in the 1950s	
Namel Weeramuni	dramatist, play producer	
Tissa Wijesurendra	film actor in the 1970s	

=== Media ===
Name	Notability	Reference
Denzil Peiris	Editor of The Ceylon Observer (1961-1970)	
Chitrananda Abeysekera	poet, former Director of Sinhala Service of the Sri Lanka Broadcasting Corporation	
Karunaratne Abeysekera	poet, songwriter, created history in the world of radio by being the first ever Sinhala cricket commentator over airwaves of Radio Ceylon	
Premasara Epasinghe	cricket commentator, private secretary and media consultant to Minister of Education, former head of public relations, Bank of Ceylon	
Rajeewa Jayaweera	Newspaper columnist	
Srimath Indrajith Liyanage	Television and radio presenter; actor	
Palitha Perera	former Deputy Director General (Commercial) of Sri Lanka Rupavahini Corporation, former Director of Sinhala Service Sri Lanka Broadcasting Corporation, cricket commentator	
Suwanda H. J. Sugunasiri	columnist, Toronto Star, Ontario, Canada	
Nalaka Vithanage	theatre, television and cinema director	

== Sports ==
Name	Notability	Reference
Ishara Amerasinghe	former Sri Lanka Test/One Day International cricketer	
Hemantha Devapriya	former Sri Lanka "A" Cricket team coach	
Kumar Dharmasena	former Sri Lanka Test/One Day International cricketer and Member of ICC Elite Panel of Umpires	
Sriyantha Dissanayake	athlete, former Sri Lanka 100m record holder 1990, Asian Games silver medalist	
Chamara Dunusinghe	former Sri Lanka Test/One Day International cricketer	
Yohan Goonasekera	former Sri Lanka Test/One Day International cricketer, Best Schoolboy Cricketer of the Year (1976)	
Kusal Goonewardena	Australian physical therapist and health lecturer	
Roshan Guneratne	former Sri Lanka Test cricketer	
Asanka Gurusinha	former Sri Lanka Test/One Day International cricketer, manager of Sri Lanka national cricket team	
Milinda Jayasinghe	former Sri Lankan rugby union player	
Stanley Jayasinghe	former all Ceylon and Leicestershire County Cricket Club cricketer	
Sunil Jayasinghe	former One Day International cricketer	
Mahela Jayawardena	former Sri Lanka Test cricket captain, Chairman Sri Lanka National Sports Council (NSC)	
Shantha Kalavitigoda	former Sri Lanka Test cricketer	
Lalith Kaluperuma	former Sri Lanka Test/One Day International cricketer; former Chairman of Selectors Sri Lanka Cricket	
Sanath Kaluperuma	former Sri Lanka Test/One Day International cricketer	
Sumith Liyanage	former Olympian boxer	
Roshan Mahanama	former Sri Lanka Test/One Day International Cricket Captain, Elite Panel Referee of International Cricket Council	
Dilshan Munaweera	Sri Lankan T20 cricketer, Sri Lanka A cricketer	
Yoga Perera	motor car racing champion	
Prageeth Rambukwella	Member of ICC International Panel of Umpires	
Anura Ranasinghe	former Sri Lanka Test/One Day International cricketer	
Keerthi Ranasinghe	former One Day International cricketer; professional Middlesex CCC cricket coach	
Gihan Rupasinghe	Sri Lankan T20 cricketer, Sri Lanka A cricketer	
Jayantha Seneviratne	represented the National Cricket Team from 1973 to 1980, Chairman of the Coaching Committee of Sri Lanka Cricket	
Sachithra Serasinghe	Sri Lanka A cricketer	
Shammi Silva	President of Sri Lanka Cricket; former president and Chairman of the Gymkhana Club; Colombo Cricket Club; former national player, manager and national coach for squash	
Roy Silva	first Sri Lankan to play for United States national cricket team	
Ashan Priyanjan Subasinghe	captain of Sri Lanka A cricket team, One Day International cricketer	
P. H. D. Waidyatilleka	civil engineer; Chairman of Technical Committee Asian Masters Athletics; first Sri Lankan to be appointed as an International Technical Officer (ITO) by International Association of Athletics Federations (IAAF); only Sri Lankan to qualify as an IAAF Lecturer	
Bandula Warnapura	Sri Lanka's Inaugural Test cricket captain	
Priyankara Wickramasinghe	former Sri Lanka A cricketer; Malaysian National Cricketer	
Gamini Wickremasinghe	former Sri Lanka Test/One Day International cricketer	

== Architects ==
Name	Notability	Reference
Justin Samarasekera	architect, past President of Sri Lanka Association for the Advancement of Science	
Gamini Wijesuriya	architect, archaeologist, winner of ICCROM Heritage award 2021	

== Medicine ==
Name	Notability	Reference
Hudson Silva	Founder President of the International Eye Bank, Tissue Bank, and the Sri Lanka Eye Donation Society	
Vajiranath Lakshman De Silva	Founder of Saukyadana Movement of Sri Lanka	
Mohan De Silva	Professor of Surgery at University of Sri Jayewardenepura	
P. T. De Silva	President of Ceylon College of Physicians 1984; Physician	
Vinya Ariyaratne	Faculty of Medical Sciences at University of Sri Jayewardenepura, General Secretary of Sarvodaya	
Sarath Samarage	National Consultant World Health Organization, Physician, recipient of knighthood 2019	
Udaya Ranawaka	Professor/Senior Consultant, Lecturer Neurologist North Colombo Teaching Hospital(NCTH), Faculty of Medicine, University of Kelaniya	
Prasanna Gunasena	neurosurgeon Lanka Hospitals, Chairman of State Pharmaceutical Company (SPC) of Sri Lanka	
W. D. L. Fernando	Forensic pathologist and Judicial Medical Officer (JMO) for Colombo	

== Other ==
Name	Notability	Reference
Pradeep Nilanga Dela	Diyawadana Nilame (Chief Lay Head or Trustee) of the Kandy Temple of the Tooth	
Sarath Gunapala	Manager Jet Propulsion Laboratory National Aeronautics and Space Administration NASA	
Indrani Iriyagolla	humanitarian activist	
Harischandra Wijayatunga	President of Sinhalaye Mahasammatha Bhoomiputra	
