= List of Sri Lankan engineers =

The following is a list of notable Sri Lankan engineers.

== A ==
- Mahesh Amalean

== B ==
- Cecil Balmond

== D ==
- P. Dayaratna
- Prashantha De Silva
- Salinda Dissanayake

== E ==
- Saman Ediriweera

== G ==
- Lalith Gamage
- U. N. Gunasekera

== I ==
- Abhaya Induruwa

== J ==
- C. L. V. Jayathilake
- Theodore Godfrey Wijesinghe Jayewardene

== K ==
- Sam Karunaratne
- A. N. S. Kulasinghe

== L ==
- E P B Liyanage

== M ==
- Mohan Munasinghe

== N ==
- Udaya Nanayakkara

== P ==
- Rohan Pathirage
- Denis Perera

== S ==
- Nalin Seneviratne
- Kanagaratnam Sriskandan
- Premala Sivaprakasapillai Sivasegaram

== W ==
- Mallory Evan Wijesinghe
- Ray Wijewardene
- D. J. Wimalasurendra
