= Gagan Bulathsinghala =

Sri Lanka Air Force air marshal (born 1961)

Air Chief Marshal Gagan Bulathsinghala
- Born: 12 September 1961 (age 65); Colombo
- Military career
- Allegiance: Sri Lanka
- Branch: Sri Lanka Air Force
- Service years: 1981 - 2016
- Rank: Air Chief Marshal
- Unit: No. 4 Squadron SLAF
- Commands: Commander of the Air Force; Chief of Staff
- Conflicts: Sri Lankan Civil War
- Awards: Rana Wickrama Padakkama; Rana Sura Padakkama; Vishista Seva Vibhushanaya; Uttama Seva Padakkama
- Other work: Ambassador to Afghanistan

Air Chief Marshal Gagan Bulathsinghala (also known as Gagan Pulasthi Bulathsinghala) RWP, RSP, VSV, USP, MPhil (Def & Strat), MSc (Def Stud) in Mgt, FIM(SL) National Defence College, India, psc is a retired air officer and a former commander of the Sri Lanka Air Force. He has also held the position of Chief of the Air Staff and after his retirement on 12 September 2016, was appointed the Sri Lankan Ambassador to Afghanistan, a position he holds currently.

== Early life and education ==
Gagan was born in Colombo on 12 September 1961. His father was Bulathsinghalage Percy Marcus Perera, who was a lawyer and a former flight lieutenant in the Royal Ceylon Air Force. His mother was Dona Beatrice Perera. He received his entire education from Nalanda College, Colombo. While at school he did many extracurricular activities such as cadeting, ruby and being a member of many school societies. He was involved in publishing the college's monthly newspaper, Nalanda. Some of his contemporaries at Nalanda are Major General Ubaya Madawela, Major General Janaka Walgama, Major General Ajith Wikramasingha, the consultant neurologist Udaya Ranawaka and the Sri Lankan former test cricketer Sanath Kaluperuma.

Air Marshal Bulathsinghala is a graduate of Air Command and Staff College at Air University in Alabama, USA, and the National Defence College in New Delhi, India. He also has postgraduate degrees of Master of Philosophy in defence and strategic studies from University of Madras in India and a Master of Science in defence studies management from General Sir John Kotelawala Defence University in Sri Lanka. He is a Fellow of the Asia-Pacific Center for Security Studies in Hawaii and the Near East South Asia Center for Strategic Studies in the USA.

He was presented with the Nalanda Keerthi Sri award by his alma mater, Nalanda College, Colombo, in 2015.

== Military career ==
Bulathsinghala joined the National Defence College as an officer cadet on 12 February 1981 and was commissioned as a pilot officer in the General Duties Pilot Branch on 8 April 1983.

He was the founding Commanding Officer of No. 6 Squadron SLAF and longest serving Commanding Officer of the No. 4 (VVIP/VIP) Helicopter Squadron SLAF. Air Marshal Bulathsinghala is a VVIP pilot with over 4,500 flying hours. He has been the VVIP pilot for four Sri Lankan presidents J. R. Jayewardene, Ranasinghe Premadasa, Dingiri Banda Wijetunga and Chandrika Kumaratunga. Gagan also commanded the Sri Lanka Air Force Base China Bay.

During Eelam War I, the then Flying Officer Bulathsinghala was the pilot of Bell 412 that was hit by a Rocket-propelled grenade that has been fired by the Liberation Tigers of Tamil Eelam on 18 December 1986 in Poovarasankulam Vavuniya. After a fierce gun battle and in spite of losing one engine, he managed to land the helicopter in Vavuniya base after declaring an emergency.

During his tenure Air Marshal Bulathsinghala held the positions of aide-de-camp to the Commander of Air Force, Overall Operations Commander Air Defence and the Command Flight Safety Officer, Chief Instructor of the Air Wing at Defence Service Command and Staff College, Director Air Operations, Chief of Staff. He was promoted to the rank of air marshal on 1 June 2015, and was appointed as the Commander of the Sri Lanka Air Force on 16 June 2015.

== See also ==
- List of Sri Lankan non-career diplomats

Military offices
| Preceded by Kolitha Gunathilake | Commander of the Air Force; 16 June 2015 - 12 September 2016 | Succeeded by Kapila Jayampathy |
