= Ranjith Premalal De Silva =

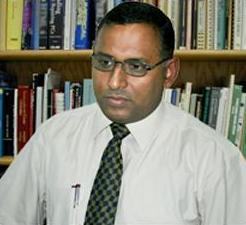
- Professor of Geo-informatics
- Born: 19 August 1963 (age 62); Sri Lanka
- Education: Nalanda College, Colombo; University of Peradeniya; Asian Institute of Technology; University for Foreigners Perugia; Cranfield University, Silsoe College, UK
- Occupation: Senior Professor
- Known for: Vice Chancellor of University of Vocational Technology (2020 - ) Vice Chancellor of Uva Wellassa University (2011-2014)
- Website: www.rpdesilva.com

Ranjith Premalal De Silva is a Sri Lankan professor of Agricultural engineering and former Vice Chancellor of the Uva Wellassa University. He is the founder President of Geo-Informatics Society of Sri Lanka. He is the current Vice-Chancellor of University of Vocational Technology. He is the Acting Director and CEO of National Institute of Fundamental Studies, Hantana, Kandy.

== Background ==
De Silva was educated at Nalanda College, Colombo before he proceeded to the University of Peradeniya where he obtained a bachelor's degree in Agricultural science. He later obtained a master's degree in Agricultural engineering from Asian Institute of Technology, Thailand before he received a postgraduate certificate in Water resources from the University for Foreigners Perugia. He received a doctorate degree in Agricultural Engineering from Cranfield University, United Kingdom.

In 2011 De Silva was appointed as the second Vice-Chancellor of Uva Wellassa University, replacing the inaugural Vice-Chancellor Prof. Chandra Embuldeniya. Prior to his appointment at Uva Wellassa University, de Silva was a professor of Geo-informatics in the Department of Agricultural Engineering at the University of Peradeniya. He was replaced as Vice-Chancellor by Dr G. Chandrasena in September 2014.
