= Milinda Peiris =

Sri Lankan senior army general

Major General Milinda Peiris මිලින්ද පීරීස් RWP RSP USP VSV LOM ndc psc
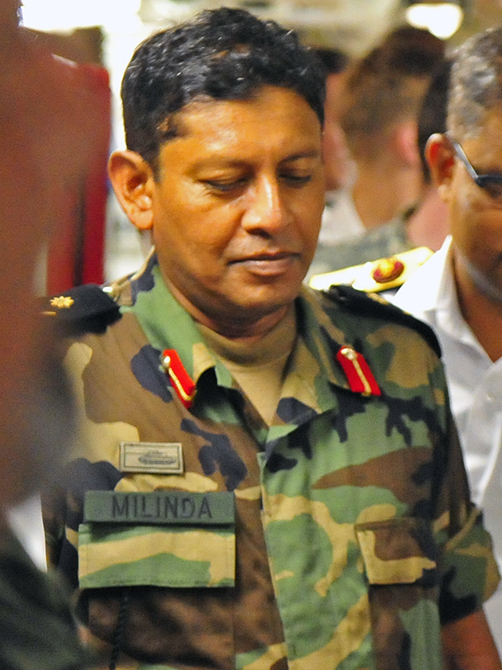
- General Milinda Peiris in 2016
- Military career
- Allegiance: Sri Lanka
- Branch: Sri Lanka Army Armoured Corps
- Service years: 1980 – 2016
- Rank: Major General
- Unit: Sri Lanka Armoured Corps
- Commands: Chief of Staff of the Army (Sri Lanka); Vice Chancellor of General Sir John Kotelawala Defence University Colonel Commandant of Sri Lanka Armoured Corps and Colonel of the Regiment - Mechanized Infantry Regiment; General Officer Commanding of 22 Division during the period of liberation of the East by the Security Forces
- Conflicts: Sri Lankan Civil War Omanthai and Valachchainai
- Awards: Rana Wickrama Padakkama; Rana Sura Padakkama; Vishista Seva Vibhushanaya; Uttama Seva Padakkama
- Other work: Vice Chancellor of KDU

Major General (retd) Milinda Peiris RWP RSP USP VSV LOM ndc psc was the Chief of Staff of the Sri Lanka Army. Peiris was Vice Chancellor (VC) of the General Sir John Kotelawala Defence University (KDU) from January 2020 to August 2023 for second occasion. Milinda's previous tenure as Vice Chancellor of KDU from December 2008 to February 2016. Presently he is the CEO / Vice Chancellor at Saegis Campus.

Peiris also commanded the 5th Regiment of the Sri Lanka Armoured Corps with distinction. Other than that, the President has appointed Peiris as a member of the Advisory Council of the Institute of National Security Studies, Sri Lanka (INSSSL).

== Education ==
Peiris received his education from Nalanda College, Colombo and was a Senior Cadet and Scout at school. Some of his contemporaries at Nalanda are Air Marshal Gagan Bulathsinghala, Major General Ubaya Madawela, Major General Janaka Walgama, Consultant Neurologist Udaya Ranawaka and former Sri Lanka test cricketer Sanath Kaluperuma.

== Sri Lanka Scout Association ==
Peiris was the Chief Commissioner of Sri Lanka Scout Association.

Military offices
Preceded by Maj Gen Sumith Balasuriya	Vice Chancellor of General Sir John Kotelawala Defence University; 28 December 2008 - 10 February 2016	Succeeded by Rear Adm Jagath Ranasinghe
