= Janaka Walgama =

Sri Lanka Army officer

Major General Janaka Walgama RSP, VSV, USP, ndu, psc
- Military career
- Allegiance: Sri Lanka
- Branch: Sri Lankan Army
- Service years: 1981 – 2019
- Unit: Sri Lanka Engineers
- Commands: General Officer Commanding 22 Division Trincomalee; General Officer Commanding 65 Division Thunukkai; General Officer Commanding 51 Division in Jaffna Commander Security Forces - East
- Conflicts: Sri Lankan Civil War
- Awards: RSP, VSV, USP
- Other work: Director General Defence Intelligence Military Secretary of the Army Commandant, Sri Lanka Military Academy Commandant, Defence Services Command and Staff College

Major General Janaka Walgama (Retd) RSP, VSV, USP, ndu, psc was the Military Adviser to the Sri Lanka's Permanent Representation to the United Nations at New York.

== Early life and education ==
Janaka received his education from Nalanda College Colombo. Contemporaries of Janaka at Nalanda were the former Air Chiefs, Air Chief Marshal Kapila Jayampathi, and Air Chief Air Chief Marshal Gagan Bulathsinghala, Major General Milinda Peiris, Major General Ubaya Madawela, Consultant Neurologist Udaya Ranawaka & former Sri Lanka test cricketer Sanath Kaluperuma.

== Army career ==
During the war times he was the General Officer Commanding 22 Division in Trincomalee and Commander for 65 Division in Thunukkai (Kilinochchi).

Prior to the present appointment he held the appointments as the Military Secretary of the Army, Commandant of the Defence Services Command and Staff College, Director General Operations at the Office of the Chief of Defence Staff. He was the General Officer Commanding 51 Division in Jaffna and Director General of Defence Intelligence also at the Office of the Chief of Defence Staff earlier.

He has also been the Commandant of the Sri Lanka Military Academy at Diyatalawa thus been one rare Officer to hold both appointments as the Commandant of the Military Academy and the Staff College respectively. He has served as the Commander Security Forces-East. He was also the former Colonel Military Secretary at the Army Headquarters.
