= Ediriweera =

Ediriweera is a given name and surname. Notable people with the name include:

== Given name ==
- Ediriweera Sarachchandra (1914–1996), Sri Lankan writer
- Ediriweera Weerawardena (born 1951), Sri Lankan politician

== Surname ==
- Bhagya Ediriweera (born 2000), Sri Lankan cricketer
- Bradman Ediriweera (born 1975), Sri Lankan cricketer
- Kavindu Ediriweera (born 1999), Sri Lankan cricketer
- P. A. Ediriweera (1915–1985), Sri Lankan travel agent and journalist
- Saman Ediriweera (fl. 1972), Sri Lankan business executive
