= Weerasekara =

Weerasekara may refer to:

- Ananda Weerasekara, Sri Lankan navy admiral
- Hemali Weerasekara (born 1969), Sri Lankan politician
- Sarath Weerasekara, Sri Lankan army officer
- Susith Weerasekara, Sri Lankan navy officer
