= Mohan De Silva =

Mohan De Silva may refer to:

- Mohan De Silva (physician)
- Mohan De Silva (politician)
