= Ruchira =

Ruchira is a given name. Notable people with the name include:

- Ruchira Gupta, Sri Lankan journalist
- Ruchira Jadhav, Indian actress
- Ruchira Kamboj (born 1964), Indian Foreign Service officer
- Ruchira Karunasena (born 1977), Sri Lankan cricketer
- Ruchira Palliyaguruge (born 1968), Sri Lankan cricketer
- Ruchira Panda (born 1975), North Indian classical vocalist
- Ruchira Perera (born 1977), Sri Lankan cricketer
- Ruchira Samarasinghe, Sri Lanka Air Force office
- Ruchira Silva, Sri Lankan fashion designer
- Ruchira Tharindra (born 1992), Sri Lankan cricketer
