= Pathirage =

Pathirage (Sinhala: පතිරගේ) is a Sri Lankan surname that may refer to the following notable people:

- Mahinda Pathirage (born 1952), Sri Lankan actor
- Rohan Pathirage, Sri Lanka Air Force officer
- Rumesh Tharanga Pathirage (born 2003), Sri Lankan javelin thrower
