= Ubaya Madawela =

Sri Lankan army general

Ubaya Medawela
- උභය මැදවල
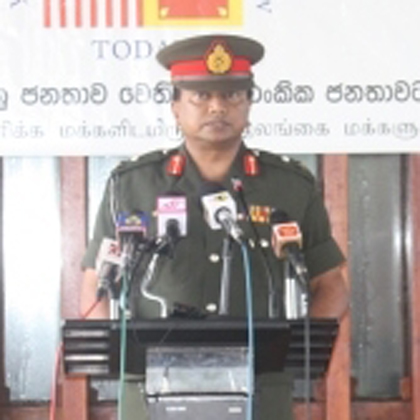
- Medawela delivering a speech at a US-Sri Lanka event
- Born: Kegalle, Sri Lanka
- Military career
- Allegiance: Sri Lanka
- Branch: Sri Lanka Army
- Service years: 1981 – 2016
- Rank: Major General
- Unit: Sri Lanka Armoured Corps
- Commands: Chief of Staff of the Army; Military Adviser to Sri Lanka mission to the United Nations in New York
- Conflicts: Sri Lankan Civil War; Insurrection 1987-89
- Awards: Rana Sura Padakkama; Vishista Seva Vibhushanaya; Uttama Seva Padakkama
- Other work: Nature Conservation and Wild Life Protection, Cross Culture Communication for Harmony

Major General Ubaya Medawela RSP, VSV, USP, ndu, psc, MSc was a Sri Lankan army general; he was the Chief of Staff of the Sri Lanka Army.

== Education ==
Ubaya received his education from Nalanda College Colombo (where he was a Senior Cadet) alongside peers such as Air Chief Marshal Gagan Bulathsinghala, Major General Ajith Wickramasinghe, Udaya Ranawaka and former Sri Lanka test cricketer Sanath Kaluperuma. He is a graduate of the New Zealand Defence College and the University of Madras, holding a MSc in Defence and Strategic Studies with an Instructor Grading.

== Military career ==
Ubaya has also been military attaché in the Sri Lankan mission to the United Nations in New York, and the army's Security Force Commander (Central & West) and a military spokesman.

Military offices
Preceded by Milinda Peiris	Chief of Staff of the Army (Sri Lanka); November 2016 - March 2017	Succeeded by Mahesh Senanayake
