= Senarath =

Senarath is both a given name and a surname. Notable people with the name include:

- Senarath Attanayake (1966–2017), Sri Lankan politician
- Senarath Paranavitana (1896–1972), Sri Lankan archeologist
- Prasanna Shamal Senarath, Sri Lankan politician
- Seelaratna Senarath (born 1944), Sri Lankan radio personality
- Sureni Senarath (1959–2021), Sri Lankan actress
- Sugathapala Senarath Yapa (born 1935), Sri Lankan film director
- Sujeewa Senarath Yapa, Sri Lanka Army general
