= P. D. J. Kumarasiri =

P.D.J Kumarasiri
- Military career
- Allegiance: Sri Lanka
- Branch: Sri Lanka Air Force
- Service years: 35 years
- Rank: Air Vice Marshal
- Commands: former Director of Aeronautical Engineering
- Awards: USP, psc
- Other work: CEO of Ceylon Aeronautical Services (Private) Limited

Air Vice Marshal P. D. J. Kumarasiri (also known as Jayanath Kumarasiri) USP, psc, MAIAA, AMRAeCS, EDBA, PGDiplE, DipQM was the former Director of Aeronautical Engineering for the Sri Lanka Air Force.

== Early life ==
Jayanath was educated at Nalanda College Colombo.
