= Saegis Campus =

Sri Lankan educational institution headquartered in Nugegoda, Colombo, Sri Lanka

- සේජීස් සරසවිය சேகிஸ் பல்கலைக்கழகம்
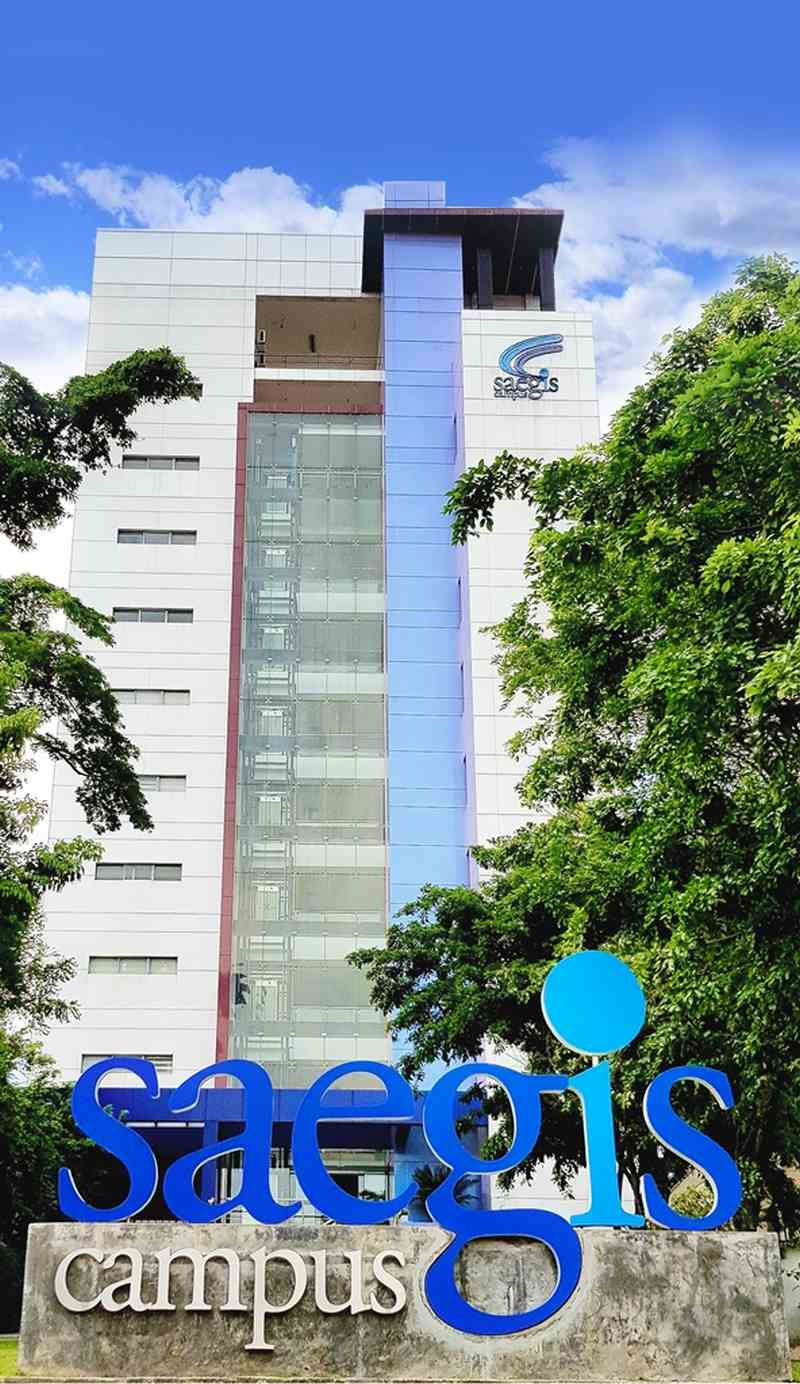
- The headquarters of the Saegis Campus in Nugegoda, Sri Lanka
- Type: Private
- Established: 2013; 13 years ago
- Founders: Bandara Dissanayake
- Accreditation: University Grants Commission (Sri Lanka); Ministry of Education (Sri Lanka)
- Affiliations: Canterbury Christ Church University
- Vice-Chancellor: Major General (retd) Milinda Peiris
- Location: Nugegoda, Colombo, Sri Lanka
- Campus: Saegis Campus
- Website: www.saegis.ac.lk

Saegis Campus, popularly known as Saegis, is a private educational institute in Sri Lanka. It delivers certificate, diploma, pre-university, undergraduate and postgraduate level programs. The institute is fully recognized as a degree-awarding institution by the Ministry of Higher Education of Sri Lanka. It has established a partnership with Canterbury Christ Church University in the United Kingdom.
