= S. D. Jayaratne =

Shanthilal Devapriya Jayaratne
- Born: 5 March 1951 (age 75); Sri Lanka
- Education: Nalanda College, Colombo
- Employer(s): University of Sri Jayewardenepura; State Pharmaceuticals Corporation of Sri Lanka
- Known for: Chairman of National Medicines Regulatory Authority, former Chairman Sri Jayawardenepura General Hospital

Shanthilal Devapriya Jayaratne was a professor of medicine at University of Sri Jayewardenepura and was Chairman of State Pharmaceuticals Corporation of Sri Lanka (SPC) and State Pharmaceuticals Manufacturing Corporation (SPMC). Jayaratne is the chairman of National Medicines Regulatory Authority, and former chairman of Sri Jayawardenepura General Hospital.

== Early life ==
Jayaratne was born in 1951 and educated at Nalanda College, Colombo. After passing the GCE Advanced Level in Sri Lanka in science stream he entered medical faculty of the University of Colombo and graduated as a Medical Doctor with a Bachelor of Medicine, Bachelor of Surgery.

== Career ==
After completing his internship at the then General Hospital Colombo (currently National Hospital of Sri Lanka), he was appointed to Kurunegala Hospital. At a later stage he was attached to Panadura Hospital too. Later for postgraduate higher education studies, Jayaratne went to United Kingdom and after completion and upon arrival back to Sri Lanka joined North Colombo Medical College Hospital and worked as a specialist doctor in Ragama Hospital. Later when University of Sri Jayewardenepura opened its Faculty of Medical Sciences, he joined it as a senior lecturer while doing clinical work at the Kalubowila Hospital. He has been a chairman of board of study in medicine of the Post graduate Institute of Medicine, University of Colombo, and later as chairperson of the board of management of the same institute. In its jubilee year in 2017 of the Ceylon College of Physicians, he was the president of the college. From 2019 he has been appointed as Chairman of the Sri Jayewardenepura Hospital and Postgraduate Centre as its chairman.
