= Bachelor of Science in Aquatic Resources and Technology =

The Bachelor of Science in Aquatic Resources and Technology (B.Sc. in AQT) (or Bachelor of Aquatic Resource) is an undergraduate degree that prepares students to pursue careers in the public, private, or non-profit sector in areas such as marine science, fisheries science, aquaculture, aquatic resource technology, food science, management, biotechnology and hydrography. Post-baccalaureate training is available in aquatic resource management and related areas.

The Department of Animal Science and Export Agriculture, at the Uva Wellassa University of Badulla, Sri Lanka, has the largest enrollment of undergraduate majors in Aquatic Resources and Technology, with about 200 students as of 2014.

The Council on Education for Aquatic Resources and Technology includes undergraduate AQT degrees in the accreditation review of Aquatic Resources and Technology programs and schools.

== See also ==
- Marine Science
- Ministry of Fisheries and Aquatic Resources Development
