= Prasad Edirisinghe =

Sri Lankan army general

- Military career
- Allegiance: Sri Lanka
- Branch: Sri Lanka Army
- Service years: 1988 –
- Rank: Major General
- Commands: Rector, General Sir John Kotelawala Defence University
- Conflicts: Sri Lankan Civil War

Major General Prasad Edirisinghe psc, is the Rector, Southern Campus, General Sir John Kotelawala Defence University.

== Early life ==
Edirisinghe received his education from Nalanda College, Colombo. He is a graduate of Defence Studies from General Sir John Kotelawala Defence University and also has obtained his master's degree in Public Administration from University of Colombo.
