= Aluthwewa Soratha Thera =

University chancellor

Dr Aluthwewa Soratha Nayaka Thera
- Born: 4 April 1943; Aluthwewa, Sri Lanka
- Died: 27 September 2013 (aged 70); Colombo, Sri Lanka
- Education: Nalanda College Colombo; University of Sri Jayewardenepura
- Known for: Viharadhikari of the Kiriwehera Temple Katharagama
- Title: Chancellor of Uva Wellassa University

Dr Aluthwewa Soratha Nayaka Thera is the Viharadhikari of the Kiriwehera Temple Katharagama and also the Chancellor of Uva Wellassa University.

He obtained his PhD in 1990 from the University of Sri Jayewardenepura for the thesis - "The Sri Lankan Bodhi Culture".

He is an alumnus of Nalanda College Colombo.
