= Prashantha De Silva =

Prishantha De Silva
- Military career
- Allegiance: Sri Lanka
- Branch: Sri Lanka Air Force
- Rank: Air Vice Marshal
- Commands: Former Director Inspection and Aeronautical Engineering
- Awards: USP

Air Vice Marshal Prishantha De Silva, USP, psc, SLAF is the former Director Inspection and Safety, and also former director of Aeronautical Engineering Sri Lanka Air Force.

He was educated at Nalanda College Colombo and joined the Sri Lanka Air Force an officer cadet.

He is a Fellow of the Institution of Engineers, Sri Lanka and is a member of the Royal Aeronautical Society.
