= H. D. Gunawardhana =

Hettipathirannehelage Dasarathasiri Gunawardhana
- Born: 23 August 1945 (age 80); Sri Lanka
- Education: Withanamulla Buddhist Mixed School Minuwangoda; Nalanda College Colombo
- Occupation: Professor
- Employer: University of Colombo Sri Lanka
- Known for: Senior Professor of Chemistry

Notes
- former Chairman, Royal Society of Chemistry, Sri Lanka Section former Chairman, Presidential task force on solid waste disposal former President, Institute of Chemistry, Ceylon former Chairman, Environment Committee, SLAAS

Hettipathirannehelage Dasarathasiri Gunawardhana is a Senior Professor of Chemistry at University of Colombo.

== Early life and education ==
He received his primary education at Withanamulla Buddhist Mixed School Minuwangoda and entered Nalanda College Colombo for secondary education. Later he graduated with a BSc (Special) Degree from University of Ceylon, Colombo and gained a PhD for Analytical Chemistry from University of Salford in United Kingdom.

== Career ==
Started his academic teaching career as a Temporary Assistant Lecturer at University of Ceylon, Colombo in 1970 and was appointed as a Professor of Chemistry (Inorganic / Analytical) in 1990. He is a Fellow of the Institute of Chemistry, Ceylon and Fellow of the National Academy of Sciences, Sri Lanka. He was also the Head of the Chemistry Department of University of Colombo from 1988 to 1995. He has also served as president of the Sri Lanka Association for the Advancement of Science in 2008.

== General references ==
- "Lecture". Daily News. 10 March 2011. Archived from the original on 15 March 2011.
- "Department of Chemistry". University of Colombo. September 2007. Archived from the original on 5 April 2011.
