= W. D. L. Fernando =

Dr W. D. L. Fernando
- Born: 18 November 1914; Colombo Sri Lanka
- Education: Nalanda College Colombo
- Known for: Forensic pathologist

Dr Warusahennadige David Lionel Fernando (known as W. D. L. Fernando or simply WDL) was a Forensic pathologist and Judicial Medical Officer (JMO) for Colombo.

== Early childhood ==
Fernando was born in 1914 and schooled at Nalanda College Colombo passed his Senior Cambridge Certificate and gained entrance to Ceylon Medical College. Later he was qualified with honours in Medicine and Surgery with a Licenciate that was recognised as a registerable qualification with General Medical Council in the United Kingdom.

== Family life ==
Fernando was married to Ethel and was father to only child Kamalani De Silva. He was the father in law of C. R. De Silva who was one time Attorney General and Solicitor General of Sri Lanka.

== Professional career ==
Fernando having worked as a Government Medical Officer in various parts of Sri Lanka after graduation joined Colombo National Hospital as an Assistant Pathologist in early 1950s. Later he won a scholarship to University of Edinburgh and studied Medical Jurisprudence and trained under Sydney Smith. Then after obtaining Membership of Royal College of Physicians of Edinburgh worked with Professor John Glaister, Keith Simpson and Donald Teare at Guy's Hospital and St George's Hospital in United Kingdom. In 1953, Fernando returned and assumed duties as Assistant Judicial Medical Officer in Colombo. In 1956 he was appointed as Judicial Medical Officer (J.M.O) Colombo and held this position until his retirement in 1970.

== Cases ==
Although Fernando was designated as J.M.O Colombo he was J.M.O Ceylon as his services were sought by Police and Courts all over the country in resolving complicated cases.

In 1953 together with Sir Sydney Smith, WDL examined the gunshot wounds on S. W. R. D. Bandaranaike before P. R. Anthonis began operating when Bandaranaike was assassinated.

In 1959 he was involved with post mortem of Anuradhapura Road Thimbiriwewa murder case (known as Wilpattu Murder). He played a vital role in convicting Alfred de Zoysa for the murder of A.K.D. Perera in Kalattawa jungle.

== Positions held ==
Fernando was a founding member of the Ceylon College of Physicians, President of Sri Lanka Medical Association, President of the Medico-Legal Society, President of Ceylon Cancer Society, Vice President of Ceylon Medical Council, Vice President of Ceylon College of Physicians, Vice President of Organisation of Professional Associations and President of the Government Medical Officer's Association (GMOA).
