= Samantha Wimalathunga =

- Military career
- Allegiance: Sri Lanka
- Branch: Sri Lanka Navy
- Service years: 1984-2015
- Rank: Rear Admiral
- Commands: Deputy Area Commander of the North Western and the Northern Naval Areas
- Conflicts: Sri Lankan Civil War
- Awards: RWP, USP
- Other work: Director General of Sri Lanka Coast Guard

Rear Admiral Samantha Wimalathunga RWP, USP, MSc(DS)Mgt, MA(SSS) is a retired Sri Lankan admiral who served as Director-General of the Sri Lanka Coast Guard.

Wimalathunga undertook his education at Elapitiwela Kanishta Vidyalaya, Gampaha and Nalanda College, Colombo, before joining the Sri Lanka Navy as a Cadet Officer in 1984. Wimalathunga is a Master of Science graduate of General Sir John Kotelawala Defence University in Defence Studies, Master of Arts graduate of National Defense University Washington D.C., USA, Master of Science graduate of National Defence University, Pakistan in National Security and War.

Wimalathunga was the Deputy Area Commander of the North Western and the Northern Naval Areas. He has also held the position of Director Logistics Management Cell at the Naval Headquarters.

In July 2015 Wimalathunga was appointed the Director General of the Sri Lanka Coast Guard.

== General references ==
- Katchativu Church festival - a meeting point for devotees of India and Sri Lanka, concluded peacefully
- Nalanda College Alumni (Sri Lanka Navy)
