= Kamal Karunanayake =

Sri Lankan politician (1937–2006)

Hon. Kamal Karunanayake

Member of Parliament for National List
- In office 1989–1994

Personal details
- Born: 29 April 1937 Minuwangoda, Sri Lanka
- Died: 18 November 2006 (aged 69)
- Party: United People's Freedom Alliance
- Education: Nalanda College Colombo
- Occupation: Politics
- Profession: Professor in Economics

Professor Kamal Karunanayake (29 May 1937 - 18 November 2006) was a former MP, who represented the People's Alliance as a National List member from 1989 to 1994.

After Karunanayake was educated at Nalanda College Colombo and obtained a BA (Hons) degree in Economics from the Peradeniya University in 1962. He received a doctorate from the Birmingham University in England in 1969. In 2002 he retired as the Professor of Economics and the Director of the Centre for Development Studies at the University of Kelaniya.

Since November 2006, he served as the Senior Presidential Advisor in Economics contributing to the formulation of the Mahinda Chintana policy.
