= Vijitha Meddegoda =

Sri Lankan admiral (born 1965)

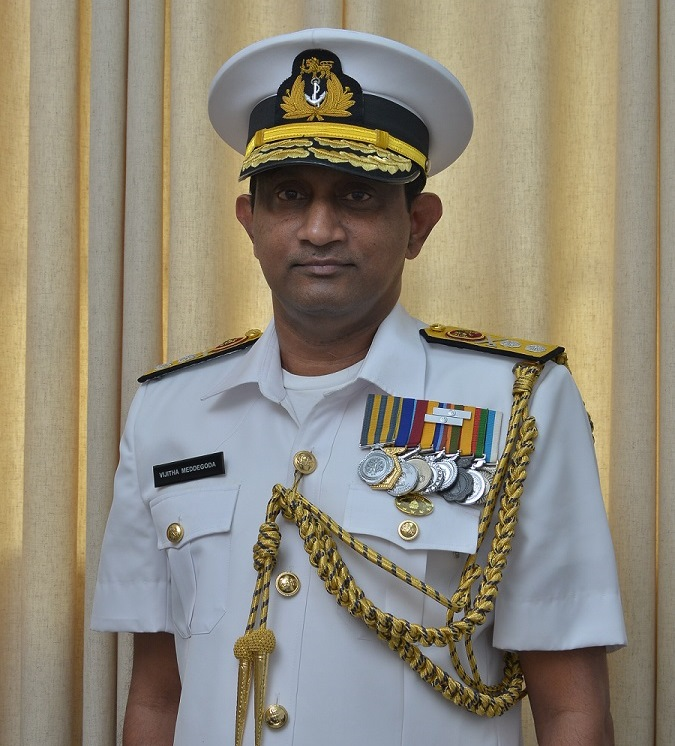
- Born: 4 December 1965 (age 60)
- Spouse: Shiranthi Meddegoda
- Military career
- Allegiance: Sri Lanka
- Branch: Sri Lanka Navy
- Service years: 34 Years [2 June 1986]
- Rank: Rear Admiral (S)
- Unit: Logistics Branch
- Commands: Director Naval Foreign Procurement [2009-2015]; Director Integrated Logistics Management System [2011-2015]; Director Naval Budget [2011-2015]; Naval Secretary to Commander of the Navy [2014-2015]; Commodore Superintendent Logistics (East) [2015-2016]; Director Naval (Pay & Pension) [2016-2017]; Director Naval Logistics [July 2017 - Jan 2018]; Secretary to the Commander of the Navy [Since Oct 2017]; Naval Secretary & Secretary to the Commander of the Navy [Oct 2017-May 2018]; Director Naval Logistics [July 2017 - Jan 2018]; Director General Budget & Finance [Jan 2018 - Dec 2020]
- Conflicts: Sri Lankan Civil War
- Awards: Uttama Seva Padakkama; Sri Lanka Armed Services Long Service Medal; Commendation with 6 Stars by Commander of the Navy

Rear Admiral (Retired) Vijitha Bandara Meddegoda, USP, BA (Defence studies), MBA,[Australia was a senior logistics Officer in the Sri Lanka Navy. He was the former Director General (Budget & Fimance) of Sri Lanka Navy. He was also the former Director Naval (Logistics), Director Naval (Pay & Pension), Director Naval (Budget), Director Naval (Foreign Procurement). Further, he hold many key appointments during his career. Rear Admiral Vijitha Meddegoda had retired from his service w.e.f 4 December 2020.

== Education ==
Rear Admiral Vijitha Meddegoda was a student of Nalanda College, Colombo. He joined the General Sir John Kotelawala Defence Academy in 1986 as a cadet officer and on completion of his basic Naval training at the Naval and Maritime Academy, Trincomalee. He was commissioned into the Logistics Branch of the Sri Lanka Navy on 17 June 1988. Subsequently, he followed a Sub Lieutenant Technical course in Sri Lanka and completed his Long Logistics management course in India.

Rear Admiral Meddegoda earned a Master of Business Administration from University of Western Sydney, Australia and Bachelor of Arts (Defence studies) in management from the General Sir John Kotelawala Defence University.

== Naval career ==
Rear Admiral Vijitha Meddegoda, during his Naval career spanning over 34 years, acquired wide and varied experiences. Being an officer in the Logistics branch, Rear Admiral Meddegoda easily counts numerous appointments inclusive of Supply Officer, Staff officer, and Commodore Superintendent Logistics Department. Also served in appointments like Director Naval Budget, Director Naval Foreign Procurement, Director Naval (Integrated Logistics Management System), Director Naval (Pay & Pension)& Director Naval Logistics. And also, he was served as ‘Naval Secretary’ & Secretary to Commander of the Navy in two occasion (Sep 2014 - July 2015) (Oct 2017-May2018). He was the former Director General (Budget & Finance). He retired from his service on 4 December 2020.

== Decorations and medals ==
Rear Admiral Vijitha Meddogoda's Naval career has been rewarded on several occasions. In recognition of his performance as a naval officer he has been recipient of Uttama Seva Padakkama, Sri Lanka Navy's 50th Anniversary Medal, Sri Lanka Armed Services Long Service Medal, 50th Independence Anniversary Commemoration Medal, North and East Operational Medal, Purna Bhumi Padakkama and Riviresa Campaign Service Medal. He has also been commended Six times in his career by the Commander of the Navy, for outstanding performance of duty, professional competency and exceptional contributions to the Naval Service.

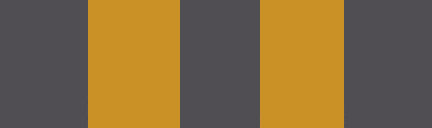

== Family ==
Vijitha is married to Shiranthi Wijesekara in 1994 who is working as a Senior Banking Officer in Canada..
