= Suwanda H. J. Sugunasiri =

Professor Suwanda H. J. Sugunasiri
- Born: 1936 (age 89–90); Tangalle Sri Lanka
- Education: Nalanda College Colombo, Ananda College, Vidyalankara University, University of London, University of Pennsylvania, University of Toronto
- Occupation: Professor
- Known for: Novelist, poet and scholar

Suwanda H. J. Sugunasiri (known as Suwanda Sugunasiri) is a Canadian academic, educator, Buddhist monk, author, journalist and poet. He is a former education professor at the University of Ontario Institute of Technology in Oshawa, Ontario, and the founder of the now-defunct Nalanda College of Buddhist Studies (Canada) in Toronto.

== Early childhood and education ==
Sugunasiri was born to Buddhist parents in Tangalle, Sri Lanka, and educated at Nalanda College Colombo and Ananda College in Colombo. While at Nalanda he was active in sports, serving as vice-captain of an under-16 team, and also a lance-sergeant of a junior cadet platoon at Nalanda.

Although he failed to gain admission to University of Ceylon, Sugunasiri earned a Bachelor of Arts degree from University of London through self-study, specializing in the Pali, Sanskrit and Sinhala languages.

In 1964 he earned a Fulbright Smith Mundt scholarship from the University of Pennsylvania in the United States.

Sugunasiri also holds a master's degree in linguistics from the University of Pennsylvania, and two master's degrees in moral philosophy, and scientific study of religion and Buddhism from the University of Toronto. He was awarded a Doctor of Philosophy in national development by the Ontario Institute for Studies in Education at the University of Toronto.

== Later life ==
Sugunasiri is also the founder of Nalanda College of Buddhist Studies (Canada), and served as its president in the early 2000s.

He was a columnist at the Toronto Star from 1993 to 1998. He was the president of the Buddhist Council of Canada. After January 1, 2019 he was ordained as a Theravadin Buddhist monastic, taking the name Ven. Bhikkhu Mihita.

He has authored numerous books in Buddhism, South-Asian Canadian literature, and Canadian multiculturalism. He also wrote fiction and poetry.
