= Vajiranath Lakshman De Silva =

- Born: 29 July 1929; Sri Lanka
- Died: 19 June 2010 (aged 80)
- Education: Nalanda College Colombo
- Occupation: Dr
- Known for: Founder of Saukyadana Movement of Sri Lanka

Dr Vajiranath Lakshman De Silva (Sinhala: වජිරනාත් ලක්ෂ්මන් ද සිල්වා) is the founder of Saukyadana Movement of Sri Lanka.

== Early life and education ==
Vajiranath who received his education from Nalanda College, Colombo graduated as a Medical Doctor by obtaining MBBS degree University of Colombo's Medical Faculty and later further studied at University of London.

== Saukyadana Movement ==
Whilst on a pilgrimage to Sri Pada (Sri Lanka) in 1959 by Dr Vajiranath he observed the difficulties that pilgrims faced along the trek and as a result he decided to set up the voluntary medical assistance unit to help them paving the way to establish the Saukyadana Movement of Sri Lanka being established in March 1960.
