= Sarath Samarage =

Sri Lankan physician

Dr Sarath Samarage
- Born: Sri Lanka
- Education: Nalanda College Colombo; University of Colombo
- Occupation: Physician
- Employer: Institute for Health Policy

Dr Sarath Samarage is a well-known Sri Lankan consultant/community physician and a national consultant to the World Health Organization.

== Early life ==
Samarage was born in Colombo, received his primary and secondary education at Nalanda College, Colombo. While at school he was the editor of the school's magazine, editor Cricket Souvenir Buddhist Society, Secretary-Science Society, Literary Society. Later he entered University of Colombo's medical faculty and graduated with a MBBS, becoming a Medical Doctor. Samarage also obtained a MSc and an MD from the Post Graduate Institute of Medicine at the University of Colombo, in addition to a Master in Public Health (MPH) from the Johns Hopkins University.

== Career ==
Samarage was also the former Deputy Director General Planning, Ministry of Health in Sri Lanka. He is also the current President of Association of Medical Doctors of Asia -SRI LANKA Chapter. Smarage was the President of the Lions Club of Panadura. He was also the former President of the Medical Administrators of Sri Lanka. He is the Chairman of the St. John Ambulance Association and Brigade of Sri Lanka.

== Knighthood ==
In 2019 Samarage received a Knighthood from Queen Elizabeth in recognition of his service through St. John's Ambulance Association and Brigade Sri Lanka.
