= Rohan Pathirage =

- Allegiance: Sri Lanka
- Branch: Sri Lanka Air Force
- Rank: Air Vice Marshal
- Commands: Director Electronics and Telecommunications Engineering
- Conflicts: Sri Lankan Civil War
- Awards: Uttama Seva Padakkama

Air Vice Marshal Rohan J Pathirage, USP, ndc, psc, CEng, MIE, SLAF was a Director Electronics and Telecommunications Engineering of the Sri Lanka Air Force.

Educated at the prestiges Royal College Colombo, he gained his BSc and MSc in Engineering from the University of Moratuwa. Thereafter he joined the Sri Lanka Air Force as a direct entry officer in the Engineering Branch. After successful completion of basic training he was commissioned as a Flight Lieutenant through the direct entry stream. He is a Chartered engineer and corporate member of the Institution of Engineers, Sri Lanka.

Air Vice Marshal Pathirage has been awarded the service medals Uttama Seva Padakkama and Sri Lanka Armed Services Long Service Medal. He is a vice president of the Sri Lanka Volleyball Federation.
