= Siri Perera =

Siri Perera QC
- Born: February 1910; Sri Lanka
- Died: 1995 (aged 85)
- Other names: U.A.S. Perera "Siri Aiya" of Radio Ceylon
- Education: Nalanda College Colombo
- Occupation: Lawyer
- Known for: Poetry

Siri Perera QC (February 1910 – 1995) was a Criminal lawyer, a Buddhist leader who was one time the President of the Colombo YMBA. He was also a former Sri Lanka High Commissioner to India.

== Early life and education ==
Perera was educated at Nalanda College Colombo. He was also a member of the teaching staff at Nalanda. He was also a graduate of Sri Lanka Law College. He obtained a First Class in the Final Examination and was enrolled as an Advocate of the Supreme Court of Sri Lanka in March 1933.

== Criminal lawyer ==
In Perera's career as a criminal lawyer he appeared for some well known cases such as Galle Face flats murder case, Turf Club robbery and murder case, Matara Police Station murder case and Dematagoda acid bath murder case.

== See also ==
- Sri Lankan Non Career Diplomats
