= Gamini Wijesuriya =

Sri Lankan architect

- Born: Nagollagoda in Kurunegalan District, Sri Lanka
- Education: Nagollagoda Maha Vidyalaya, Nalanda College, Colombo
- Occupations: Architect, Archaeologist, Heritage Manager
- Known for: Architecture, Archaeology, Heritage Management

Gamini Wijesuriya is a Sri Lankan architect and archaeologist, known for being a specialist in heritage management.

== Early life ==
Wijesuriya was born in Kurunegala District and completed his education at Nagollagoda Maha Vidyalaya and Nalanda College, Colombo. After graduating from the University of Moratuwa with a Bachelor of Science and a Master's degree in architecture, he began his career as a conservation architect. Wijesuriya went on to earn a Master's degree in archeology and heritage management from the University of York and another Master's degree in historic preservation from the Carnegie Mellon University. He later obtained his PhD from Leiden University, where he presented his dissertation on "Buddhist Meditation Monasteries in Ancient Sri Lanka".

== Career ==
Wijesuriya joined the field of archaeology and conservation as Project Manager of the Sri Lanka Cultural Triangle Project. He then served on the Department of Archaeology for 18 years as Assistant Commissioner (architect), Deputy Commissioner (architect) and Director (architectural conservation). He went on to serve as the Principal Regional Scientist in the Department of Conservation of New Zealand. He later joined ICCROM as the first Asian professional to join its service. Wijesuriya currently acts as a Special Advisor to the ICCROM Director General and a Special Advisor to the Director of WHITRAP Shanghai.

== Recognition ==
- ICCROM 2021 Heritage award.
