= Bradman Ediriweera =

Sri Lankan cricketer (born 1975)

Personal information
- Full name: Prince Bradman Ediriweera
- Born: 19 September 1975 (age 51); Colombo, Sri Lanka
- Batting: Left-handed
- Bowling: Right-arm medium
- Role: Batsman

Domestic team information
- Years: Team
- 1995–2003: Colombo CC
- 1996–1997: Bloomfield CAC
- 2003–2006: Tamil Union CAC
- 2006–2007: Sebastianites CAC
- 2008–2009: Lankan CC
- FC debut: 17 November 1995 Colombo CC v Tamil Union CAC
- Last FC: 4 December 2009 Lankan CC v Police Sports Club
- LA debut: 22 December 1996 Colombo CC v Bloomfield CAC
- Last LA: 28 October 2009 Lankan CC v Police Sports Club

Career statistics
Competition	First-class	List A
Matches	113	58
Runs scored	5,348	1,294
Batting average	33.01	28.13
100s/50s	12/25	1/5
Top score	154	118 not out
Balls bowled	1,368	132
Wickets	30	7
Bowling average	26.79	23.28
5 wickets in innings	0	0
10 wickets in match	0	0
Best bowling	3/28	3/24
Catches/stumpings	93/–	20/–
- Source: CricketArchive, 4 July 2012

Prince Bradman Ediriweera (born 19 September 1975) is a Sri Lankan former first-class cricketer whose career as a left-handed batsman and an occasional right-arm medium pace bowler spanned the 1995–96 to 2008–09 seasons.

== Playing career ==
After representing Sri Lanka at youth level, Ediriweera made his first-class debut for Colombo Cricket Club in November 1995. In a 14-year career, he played 113 first-class matches and 58 List A matches. At international level, he played for the Sri Lanka Under-19s and Sri Lanka A but he did not play for the full national team. In domestic cricket, Ediriweera played for five different teams: Colombo CC (1995–2003), Bloomfield CAC (1996–1997), Tamil Union CAC (2003–2006), Sebastianites CAC (2006–2007), and Lankan CC (2008–2009).
