= Felix R. de Zoysa =

Sri Lankan businessman

- Born: Balapitiya Sri Lanka
- Education: Nalanda College Colombo
- Known for: founding Chairman of Stafford Motor Company, Stafford International School and Atlas Hall

Felix R. de Zoysa is the founding Chairman of Stafford Motor Company, Stafford International School and Atlas Hall in Sri Lanka. De Zoysa was the head of Auto & General Agencies who held the distributorship of Honda motor vehicles in Sri Lanka in 1960s. After the incorporation of both companies, Stafford Motor Company became the sole distributor for Honda motor vehicles. He was also nicknamed "Mr. Honda" of Sri Lanka.

In 1959, De Zoysa founded the Stafford International School for both females and males so that Sri Lankans can be competitive in international arena.

He established the Atlas Hall in 1946. It publishes educational publications in Sinhala, Tamil and English.

He was educated at Nalanda College Colombo and was also a well known philanthropist.
