= Ranjith Laxman Wijayawardana =

Sri Lankan physicist (1955–2018)

- Born: 15 January 1955; Ratnapura Ellawala, Sri Lanka
- Died: 8 April 2018 (aged 63)
- Occupations: Physicist, Senior Lecturer in Physics University of Peradeniya

Dr Ranjith Laxman Wijayawardana (Sinhala රංජිත් ලක්ෂ්මන් විජේවර්ධන; 15 January 1955 – 8 April 2018) was a Sri Lankan physicist and the Chairman of Atomic Energy Authority (AEA) of Sri Lanka. Specialising in nuclear physics, he was also a senior lecturer at the University of Peradeniya.

He was a graduate of Thalavitiya Village School Ellawala, Dharmapala Vidyalaya Pannipitiya and Nalanda College Colombo. After being a brilliant student at Nalanda College Colombo he gained admission to University of Peradeniya Science Faculty and graduated with Bachelor of Science Degree in Physics with a First Class Honour in July 1977.

From 1980 to 1986, he was awarded a Fulbright scholarship for post graduate studies at the Department of Physics, State University of New York, Albany, USA and during that time he obtained M.Sc in Physics and Ph.D in Experimental High Energy Physics from the same university.

After graduation, his first appointment was as an assistant lecturer in physics at the University of Peradeniya. He also had worked as a graduate teaching assistant in Physics at the Department of Physics, State University of New York, USA.

Until his death, Dr. Wijayawardana continued to work in the Department of Physics, University of Peradeniya, as a Senior Lecturer in Physics carrying out research on Neutron / Nuclear Physics.
