= E. P. B. Liyanage =

E.P.B Liyanage
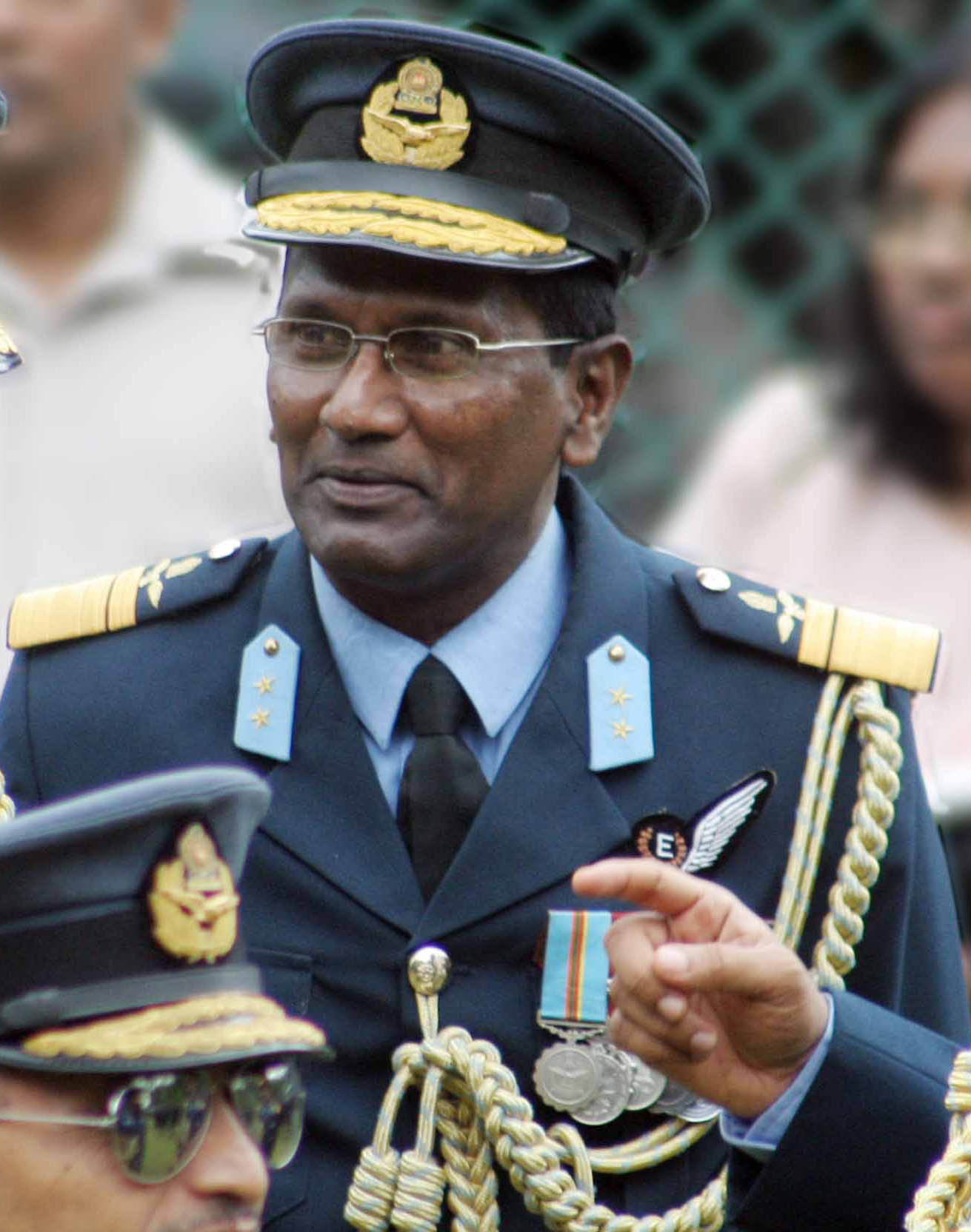
- Military career
- Allegiance: Sri Lanka
- Branch: Sri Lanka Air Force
- Service years: 1978 - 2008
- Rank: Air Vice Marshal
- Units: General Engineering and Director of Inspection and Safety
- Commands: former Director of General Engineering and Deputy Director Airworthiness

Air Vice Marshal E. P. B. Liyanage, CEng, psc, MRAeS, FIE (SL) is a retired officer of the Sri Lanka Air Force, who was the former Director of General Engineering and Director of Inspection and Safety.

== Early life ==
He received his education from Nalanda College Colombo and joined the Sri Lanka Air Force in 1978 as an officer cadet, severing till his retirement in 2009. Having competed in the Engineering Council Examination, United Kingdom he gained a MSc in Defense and Strategic Studies from the University of Madras and an MBA from the University of Colombo. A Charted Engineer, he was made a 'fellow' of the Institution of Engineers, Sri Lanka and is a member of the Royal Aeronautical Society. In 2006 he was promoted to the rank of Air Vice Marshal.

After retirement he is currently working as the Deputy Director Airworthiness for the Civil Aviation Authority of Sri Lanka.
