= Yoga Perera =

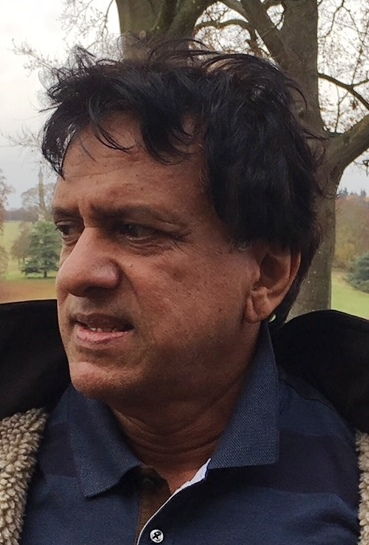
- Born: 16 August 1956 (age 69); Colombo
- Education: Nalanda College Colombo
- Occupation: Businessman
- Known for: Motor car racing champion

Yoga Perera was a champion Sri Lankan motor car and go-cart racing racing driver.

== Early childhood ==
Perera was educated at Nalanda College Colombo.

== Motor racing ==
Perera started his racing career in 1981 when he took part in the Katukurunda Novices Meet. In 1986 he represented the Sri Lanka Motor Cycle Club and was the first driving a Charade, and the following year he was placed second in Katukurunda Races with his Mini. In 1987 Perera with his Mini won the Mahagastota Hill Climb, and also won the Radella Hill Climb, recording the fastest time.

In 1989, Perera recorded the fastest time for day at Radella Speed Hill Club competing including formula cars. He secured third in the Gulf Kart Championships held in Dubai in 1989 and also took part in the Malaysian Kart Championship by invitation. He was a member of the Sri Lanka National Team for Motor Racing at that time. In 1995, Perera won the Mini Championship at Sriperempatu Track in Madras, India.

== Other activities ==
Perera has a degree in business management, is a businessman in Sri Lanka, Dubai and in South Africa and is the owner/chairman and managing director of Autoland Car Sales.

He served as a director on the board of Airport and Aviation Services from 2010 to 2015.

He is the president of Sri Lanka Auto-sports Drivers Association (SLADA).

He served as a board director of Sri Lanka Telecom from 2008 to 2010.

He is a past president of Sri Lanka Association of Racing Drivers and Riders (SLARDAR).

== General references ==
- "Yoga Perera Champion Driver in Mini". Island. October 20, 2010.
- "Gajaba Supercross on September 1". Dailynews. August 24, 2013.
- "Sri Lanka Telecom telephone directories presented to the President". Business Today. Archived from the original on 31 May 2014.
- "Countdown on 'Cavalry Supercross' Begins". Sri Lanka Army. 2013-06-06. Archived from the original on 2014-05-31.
- "Record number of entries for Nuwara Eliya Road Races". Daily News. 2012-04-17.
