= Asoka Weerasinghe =

Sri Lankan ambassador

- Born: Colombo, Sri Lanka
- Education: Nalanda College Colombo
- Known for: former Deputy High Commissioner for Sri Lanka in Canada

Asoka Weerasinghe (born in Sri Lanka) was a former deputy High Commissioner for Sri Lanka in Canada.

== Early life ==
Asoka was educated at Nalanda College Colombo, Sri Lanka.

== Poetry ==
By profession he is a Geologist, Paleontology and Museology and also one time Curator of the Ottawa Museum in Canada.
