= Institute of Management of Sri Lanka =

Sri Lankan organization

Institute of Management of Sri Lanka (IMSL)
- Abbreviation: IMSL
- Formation: 1986
- Type: Professional Body
- Headquarters: No. 95, 2nd Floor, High Level Plaza, High Level Road, Delkanda, Nugegoda, 10250, Sri Lanka
- Location: Colombo 7, Sri Lanka
- Members: 1,000
- Official language: English
- President: Sarath S. Kodithuwakku
- Website: www.imsl.lk

The Institute of Management of Sri Lanka (IMSL) is the national professional association in the field of management in Sri Lanka. It was inaugurated on 31 July 1986 and incorporated by Act of Parliament No. 67 on 17 December 1988, succeeding the Sri Lanka Management Association which was formed on 5 May 1978. It is a full member of the Asian Association of Management Organisations (AAMO), representing Sri Lanka.

== Membership ==
IMSL has three grades of members;

- Fellow - FMIM(SL)
- Member - MIM(SL)
- Associate Member - AMIM(SL).
