= List of ambassadors of Sri Lanka to Japan =

Sri Lankan Ambassador to Japan
- Emblem of Sri Lanka
- Incumbent; Rodney Perera since January 2023
- Ministry of Foreign Affairs
- Reports to: Minister of Foreign Affairs
- Seat: Sri Lankan Embessy, 2-1-54, Takanawa, Minato-ku, Tokyo, Japan
- Nominator: The president of Sri Lanka
- Term length: No fixed term
- Inaugural holder: Sir Susantha de Fonseka
- Formation: 1956; 70 years ago
- Website: slembassyjapan.com

The ambassador of Democratic Socialist Republic of Sri Lanka is the ambassador from Sri Lanka to Japan.

== List of representatives ==
- Sir Susantha de Fonseka (1956–1959)
- Herbert Tennekoon (196?–1971)
- Bernard Tilakaratna (1974–1980)
- Susantha De Alwis (1980–1983)
- Arthur Basnayake (1983–1988)
- Karunasena Kodituwakku (1988–1989)
- Chithambaranathan Mahendran (1989–1992)
- Neville Piyadigama (1999–?)
- Admiral Wasantha Karannagoda (2011–2015)
- Dhammika Ganganath Dissanayake (2015–2020)
- Rodney Perera (2023–present)

== See also ==
- List of heads of missions from Sri Lanka
