= Rahula Anura Attalage =

Sri Lankan engineer

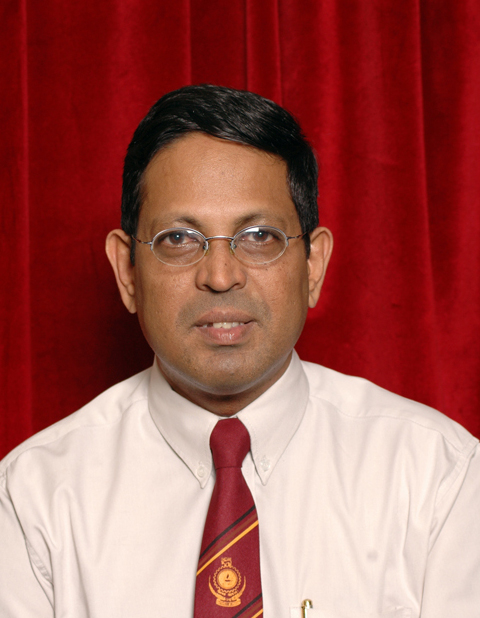
- Rahula Anura Attalage

Personal details
- Born: 13 May 1957 (age 69) Colombo
- Children: Charitha Rakshitha Attalage
- Education: University of Moratuwa; Asian Institute of Technology; Ecole des Mines de Paris
- Profession: Former Deputy Vice Chancellor and Professor of Mechanical Engineering at the University of Moratuwa
- Website: www.mrt.ac.lk/web/administration

Rahula Anura Attalage a professor of mechanical engineering and the director of the Post Graduate Institute of the Faculty of Engineering at the University of Moratuwa in Sri Lanka.

== Education ==
After completing college at Nalanda College Colombo, Rahula went on to earn a mechanical engineering degree from the University of Moratuwa. He obtained his master's degree in energy technology from the Asian Institute of Technology, Thailand. He also holds a PhD in energy engineering from Ecole des Mines de Paris, France. Attalage has received the University of Moratuwa's award for Outstanding Research Performances on five consecutive occasions.
