= Ajith Wickramasinghe =

Sri Lankan army officer

- Military career
- Allegiance: Sri Lanka
- Branch: Sri Lanka Army
- Service years: 1980 –
- Rank: Major General
- Conflicts: Sri Lankan Civil War

Major General Ajith Wickramasinghe RSP, USP, psc, is the Director General Supply and Transport of the Sri Lanka Army.

== Early life ==
Wickramasinghe was educated at Nalanda College Colombo. While at school he played cricket and represented Nalanda College first XI at Ananda-Nalanda Battle of the Maroons annual cricketing encounter.
