= Sumith Liyanage =

Sri Lankan athlete

Personal information
- Birth name: Sumith Mohandas Liyanage
- Born: 24 June 1936 (age 88); Colombo, Sri Lanka
- Height: 1.72 m (5 ft 8 in)
- Weight: 57 kg (126 lb)

Sport
- Country: Sri Lanka
- Sport: Boxing
- Club: Sinha Boxing Club
- Retired: yes

Sumith Mohandas Liyanage (born 24 June 1936) was a Ceylonese sportsman. He was the national featherweight champion in 1960 and was a member of the Ceylon contingent to the 1960 Olympic Games. He then served in the Sri Lanka Police Service reaching the position of Deputy Inspector-General of Police.

== Biography ==
Sumith Mohandas Liyanage was born in Colombo the son of Samuel Pitigala (an actor and member of Postal Department) and Lilian (a teacher and social worker). He was one of seven children in the family. Liyanage had his primary education at Ananda College before attending Nalanda College, Colombo.

He was an outstanding sportsman winning the Stubbs Shield for boxing in 1956 and 1957 for Nalanda. Liyanage won his first National Title in 1956 as a schoolboy. In the following year he won the national featherweight boxing title and represented Ceylon in the South East Asian Championship. Liyanage went on to represent Ceylon at the 1960 Rome Olympics. His first match was against the reigning European champion, Jerzy Adamski of Poland, in the opening round felled his opponent but Adamski mounted a comeback in the later rounds and won on a close points decision. Adamski went on to win the silver medal. Liyanage was voted Sri Lankan boxer of the year for his efforts in 1960.

Liyanage also served as the vice president of the Boxing Association of Sri Lanka and as the manager of the Sri Lanka Boxing Team.

In 1958 Liyanage joined the Sri Lanka Police Service, retiring with the rank of Deputy Inspector-General of Police on 24 June 1996.

Liyanage also won a silver medal in pistol shooting at the 2007 World Police and Fire Games in Adelaide, South Australia.
