= Chandra Embuldeniya =

Sri Lankan academic

- Born: Sri Lanka
- Education: Nalanda College Colombo; University of Peradeniya
- Occupation: Professor
- Known for: Vice Chancellor - Uva Wellassa University

Dr Chandra Embuldeniya was the inaugural Vice Chancellor (2004-2011) of Uva Wellassa University in Sri Lanka and the first private sector CEO to become a vice chancellor of a national university.

Dr Embuldeynia is a graduate of University of Peradeniya BSc Maths, PGD Maths, PhD (h.c.). Honored by the Uva Wellassa University for the services rendered in setting up the University and an innovative new system for higher education. He was educated at Nalanda College Colombo at primary and secondary levels.

He was the president of the National Chamber of Commerce of Sri Lanka (NCCSL), the founding president of the Business Council for Sustainable Development of Sri Lanka, the founding chairman of BIMSTEC Chamber of Commerce and Industry (Bangladesh, India, Myanmar, Sri Lanka, Thailand, Nepal, Bhutan) and the chairman of the BIMSTEC Business Forum. He was the CEO of several leading companies in Sri Lanka during the period since 1992.

== General references ==
- "Chandra invited to speak at Oxford". Dailynews. 21 May 2010. Archived from the original on 19 October 2012.
- "Helping others develop their skills". Sunday Observer. 23 November 2003. Archived from the original on 5 June 2011.
