= Mahinda Vilathgamuwa =

- Born: Sri Lanka
- Education: Nalanda College Colombo University of Moratuwa University of Cambridge, England
- Occupation: Professor
- Employer(s): Queensland University of Technology, Australia
- Known for: Electrical Engineering and Computer Science

Mahinda Vilathgamuwa is a professor of power engineering at the School of Electrical Engineering and Robotics, Queensland University of Technology in Brisbane, Australia.

After completing his high school education at Nalanda College, Colombo, Vilathgamuwa entered the University of Moratuwa; graduating with a Bachelor of Science in electrical engineering (Honours) in 1984.

In 1985 Vilathgamuwa started his academic career as assistant lecturer at University of Moratuwa. Later after obtaining a Doctor of Philosophy (PhD) in Electrical Engineering from University of Cambridge, England he became a senior lecturer at Moratuwa. His doctoral thesis was entitled Control of voltage-sourced reversible rectifiers

From 1993 to 2013 Vilathgamuwa served as an academic in the capacities of lecturer, assistant professor and associate professor at Nanyang Technological University (NTU) in Singapore.

Professor Vilathgamuwa is a fellow of the Institute of Electrical and Electronics Engineers (IEEE).

== General references ==
- "Professor Mahinda Vilathgamuwa". Queensland University of Technology Australia.
- ORCiD ID 0000-0003-0895-8443
- "D Mahinda VILATHGAMUWA Associate Professor of School of Electrical & Electronic Engineering". Nanyang Technological University. Archived from the original on 27 May 2014.
- "Prof Don Mahinda Vilathgamuwa". TUM Create. Archived from the original on 27 May 2014.
- "Nalanda College Alumni (Academics)". Nalanda College Colombo. Archived from the original on 19 May 2014.
