= Sri Jayawardenepura General Hospital =

Sri Jayewardenepura General Hospital
- Ministry of Health, Nutrition and Indigenous Medicine

Geography
- Location: Hospital Road, Sri Jayawardenepura Kotte, Sri Lanka
- Coordinates: 6.868416°N 79.925182°E

Organisation
- Care system: Public
- Type: General
- Affiliated university: University of Sri Jayewardenepura

Services
- Emergency department: Yes
- Beds: 1001

History
- Founded: 1983

Links
- Website: www.sjgh%20.health.gov.lk%20

The Sri Jayewardenepura General Hospital (abbreviated SJGH) is a teaching hospital in Sri Jayawardenepura Kotte, Sri Lanka, and serves as one of the country's main healthcare institutions. The hospital was gifted by Japan in appreciation of Sri Lankan President J. R. Jayewardene's support of Japan and diplomatic efforts on their behalf; the hospital was donated with 1001 beds, with 1000 beds to the public and 1 bed reserved for Jayawardene in his lifetime. A special Act of Parliament (Sri Jayewardenepura General Hospital Board Act, No. 54 of 1983) was established for the governance of the SJGH.

While the hospital functions as part of Sri Lanka's free healthcare system, it also contains a non-free section where paying citizens may be cared for in private rooms and more personalized levels of treatment and care.
