= Ruchira Samarasinghe =

Director Civil Engineering

Marasinhage Ruchira Kalhara Samarasinghe
- Born: 1968 (age 57–58)
- Military career
- Allegiance: Sri Lanka
- Branch: Sri Lanka Air Force
- Rank: Air Vice Marshal
- Commands: Director Civil Engineering
- Awards: Purna Bhumi Padakkama

Air Vice Marshal Marasinhage Ruchira Kalhara Samarasinghe Purna Bhumi Padakkama, BSc was a Director Civil Engineering for the Sri Lanka Air Force.

== Early life ==
Samarasinghe was born in 1968 and after completing secondary education at Nalanda College, Colombo joined General Sir John Kotelawala Defence University as an Officer cadet.

== Career ==
In 1992 Samarasinghe was commissioned in Air Field Construction Branch as a Pilot officer. He graduated with a BSc in Civil Engineering (Defence Studies) from General Sir John Kotelawala Defence University.

Samarasinghe is a recipient of service medals such as Purna Bhumi Padakkama, Long Services Medal and Clasp, Riviresa Campaign Services Medal, Northern Humanitarian Operations Medal, Eastern Humanitarian Operations Medal, 50th Independence Anniversary Medal, SLAF 50th Anniversary Medal.
