= University of Vocational Technology =

University of Vocational Technology of Sri Lanka
- වෘත්තීය තාක්ෂණ විශ්වවිද්‍යාලය
- University of Vocational Technology of Sri Lanka
- Motto: යාවජීව අධ්‍යාපනය සැමට (Sinhala)
- Motto in English: Life Long Learning for All!
- Type: Public
- Established: 2009; 17 years ago
- Affiliations: Association of Commonwealth Universities
- Chancellor: Emeritus Professor Harishchandra Abeygunawardena
- Faculty: Four faculties
- Students: 3,850
- Undergraduates: 1,600
- Location: Ratmalana, Western, Sri Lanka; 6°49′13.3″N 79°53′35.2″E
- Campus: Urban
- Colours: Blue, maroon and yellow
- Website: www.uovt.ac.lk

== History ==
The National University System in Sri Lanka has, since its inception, provided opportunities for higher education to only a small percentage of eligible students each year. As a result, a large number of students are unable to access further studies. Although some of these students enrol in occupation-oriented technical and vocational education programmes, such pathways have not been widely popular among many capable students. This is largely due to the absence of a clear and structured route for further education and professional advancement within the technical and vocational education framework.

To address this gap, the University of Vocational Technology (UoVT) was established under the University of Vocational Technology Act No. 31 of 2008, certified on 28 August 2008. The university officially commenced operations in 2009 and was created to provide an alternative pathway to university-level education in Sri Lanka — particularly for students outside the traditional G.C.E. Advanced Level route. Degrees awarded by UoVT hold the same legal and academic status as those from any other national university in the country.

At its inception, UoVT operated with two faculties — the Faculty of Industry and Vocational Technology and the Faculty of Training Technology. These were subsequently reorganised into four distinct faculties by early 2020, broadening the university's academic scope and better aligning with national industry demands.

Today, UoVT comprises four faculties: the Faculty of Education, the Faculty of Engineering Technology, the Faculty of Information Technology, and the Faculty of Industrial Technology. Each faculty houses multiple departments offering specialised undergraduate programmes across pedagogy, engineering, ICT, agriculture, management, quantity surveying, and media technology — fulfilling UoVT's mission to produce skilled, industry-ready graduates capable of contributing to Sri Lanka's socio-economic development.

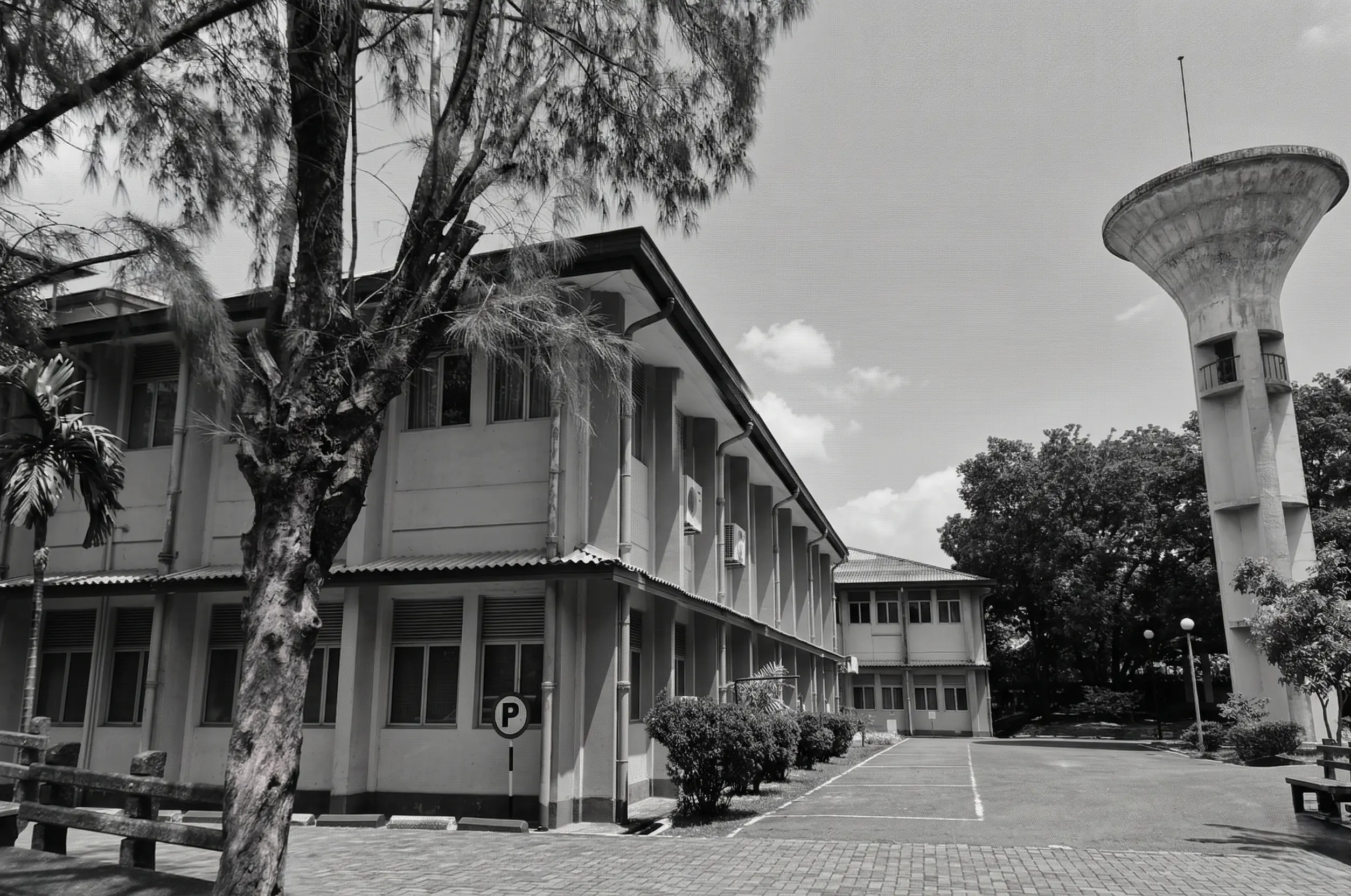
Faculty Building

== Faculties and institutes ==
The University of Vocational Technology, currently has four faculties.

=== Deans of faculties ===
Deans are the heads of the faculties.

- Faculty of Industrial technology - Mr. Dilantha Rathnayake
- Faculty of Education - Ms. L.H.D.L. Ranasuriya
- Faculty of Information Technology - Ms. T.K.Malwaththa
- Faculty of Engineering Technology - Ms. J.K. Kanthi
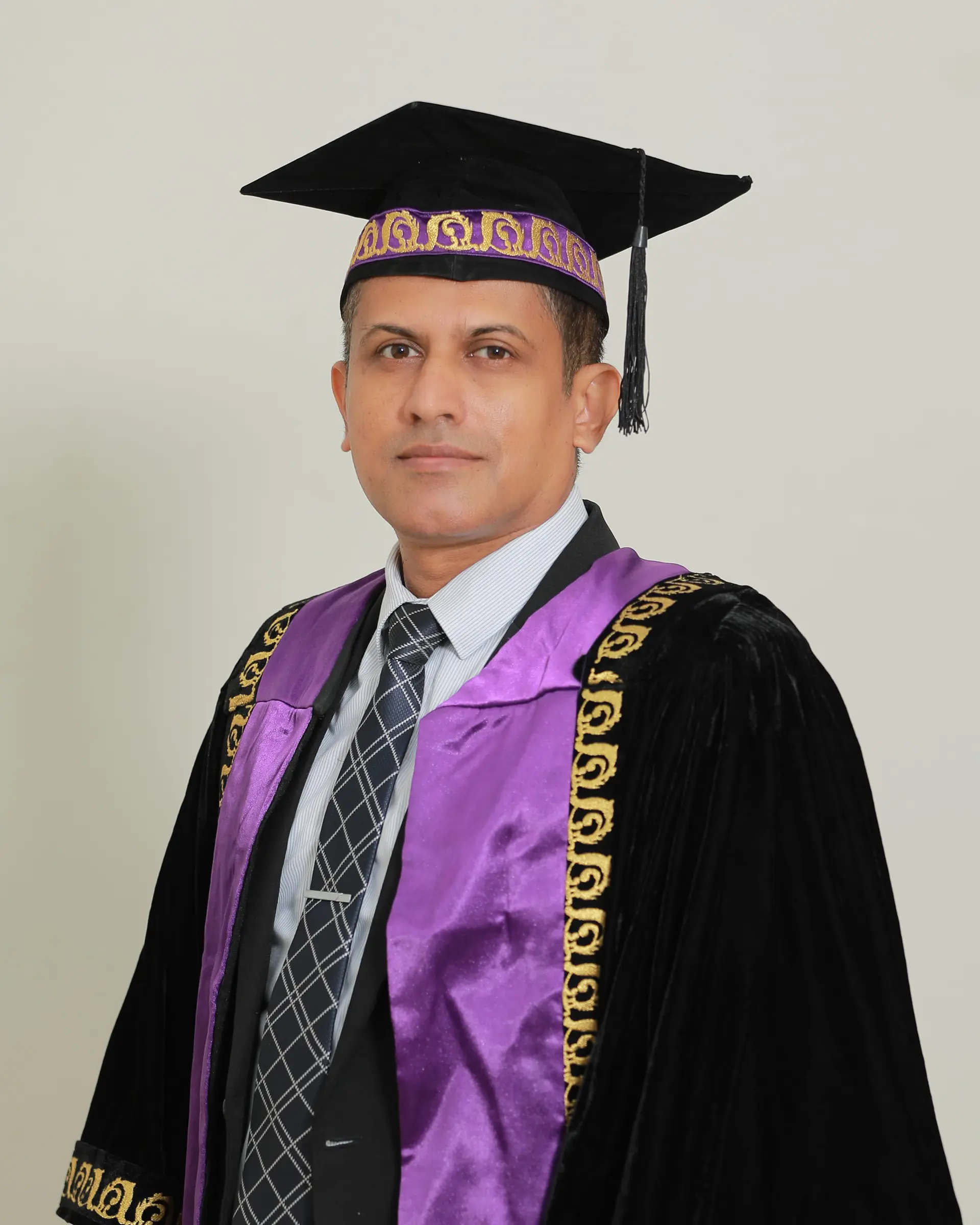
Mr. R.R.M.D.P. Rathnayake, Dean Faculty of Industrial Technology

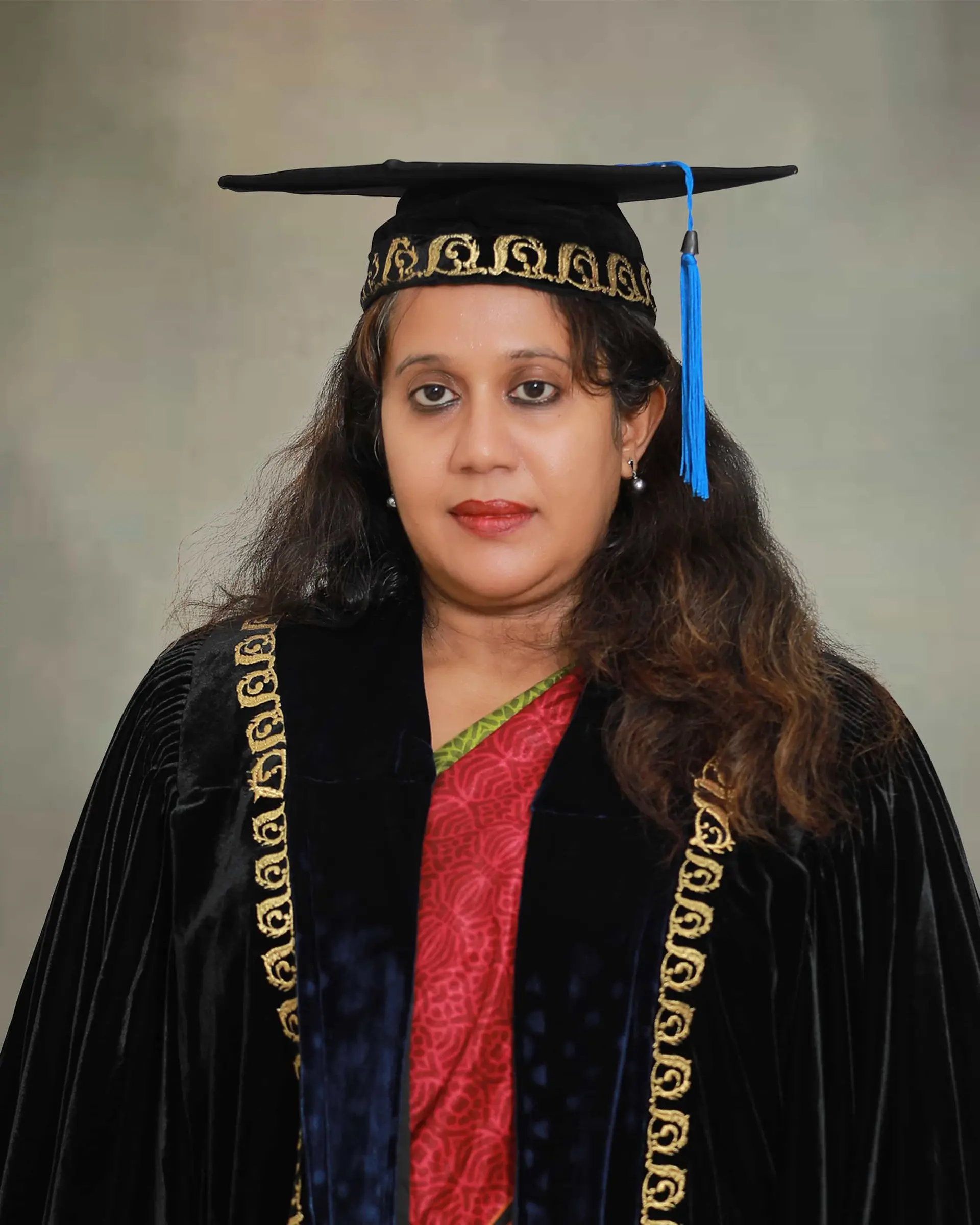
Ms. L.H.D.L. Ranasuriya, Dean Faculty of Education

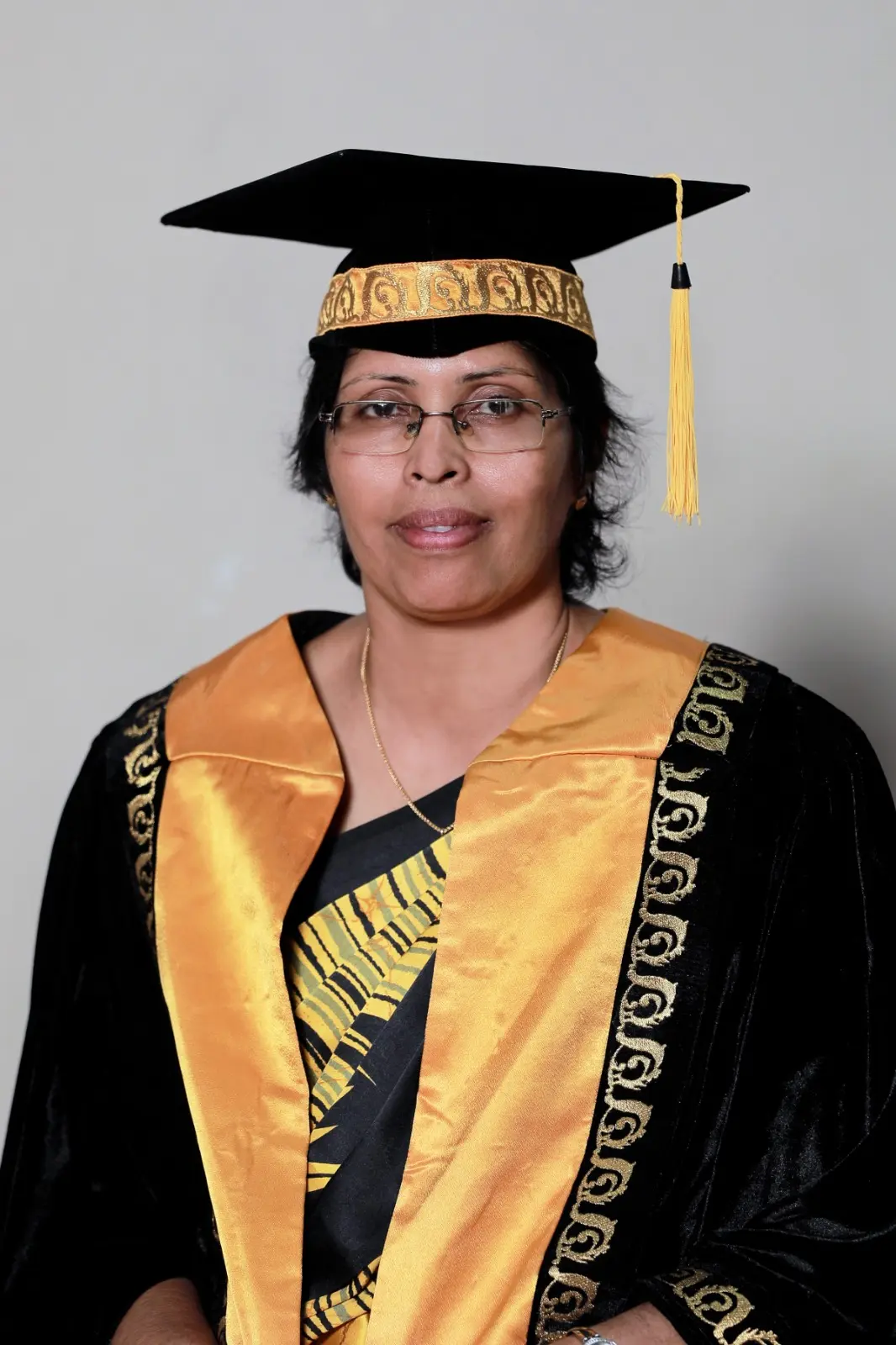
Ms. T.K. Malwatta, Dean Faculty of Information Technology

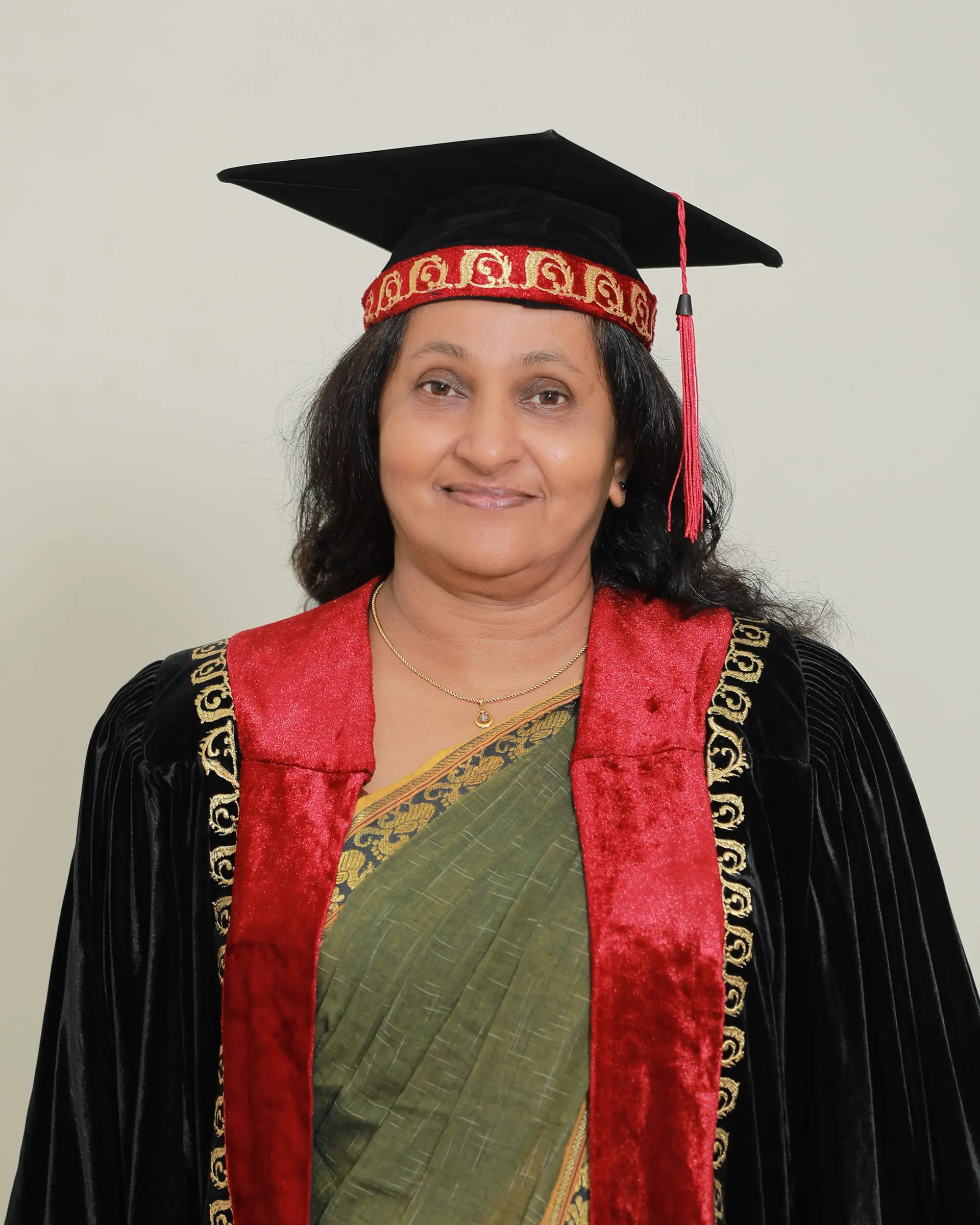
Ms. J.K. Kanthi, Dean Faculty of Engineering Technology

=== Faculty of Engineering Technology ===
Departments of the Faculty

- Department of Building Services Technology
- Department of Electro-mechanical Technology
- Department of Construction Technology

=== Faculty of Industrial Technology ===
- Department of Agricultural and Food Technology
- Department of Film and Television Production Technology
- Department of Quantity Surveying
- Department of Industrial Management
- Department of Tourism Studies

=== Faculty of Education Technology ===
Departments of the Faculty

- Department of Education and Training
- Department of Language Studies

=== Faculty of Information and Communication Technology ===
Departments of the Faculty

- Department of Software Technology
- Department of Network Technology
- Department of Multimedia and Web Technology

=== Continuing Education Centre (CEC) ===
Continuing Education Centre (CEC) and curriculum development units function under the Human Resource Development Centre (HRDC) of the university. These units provide extension services to the agencies in the TVET sector which are delivering training at NVQ Levels 1 to 6, in the areas of human resource development and curriculum development.

== Chancellor, Vice Chancellor & Board Members ==
=== Chancellor ===
The chancellor is the head of the university and is responsible for awarding all the academic degrees. Usually the chancellor is a distinguished person in an academic discipline. Otherwise it is a clergy or a distinguished person in the civil society. Appointment is done by the President of Sri Lanka. The position is mainly ceremonial and duties are usually carried out by the vice chancellor. The current chancellor of the university is emeritus Professor Harishchandra Abeygunawardena

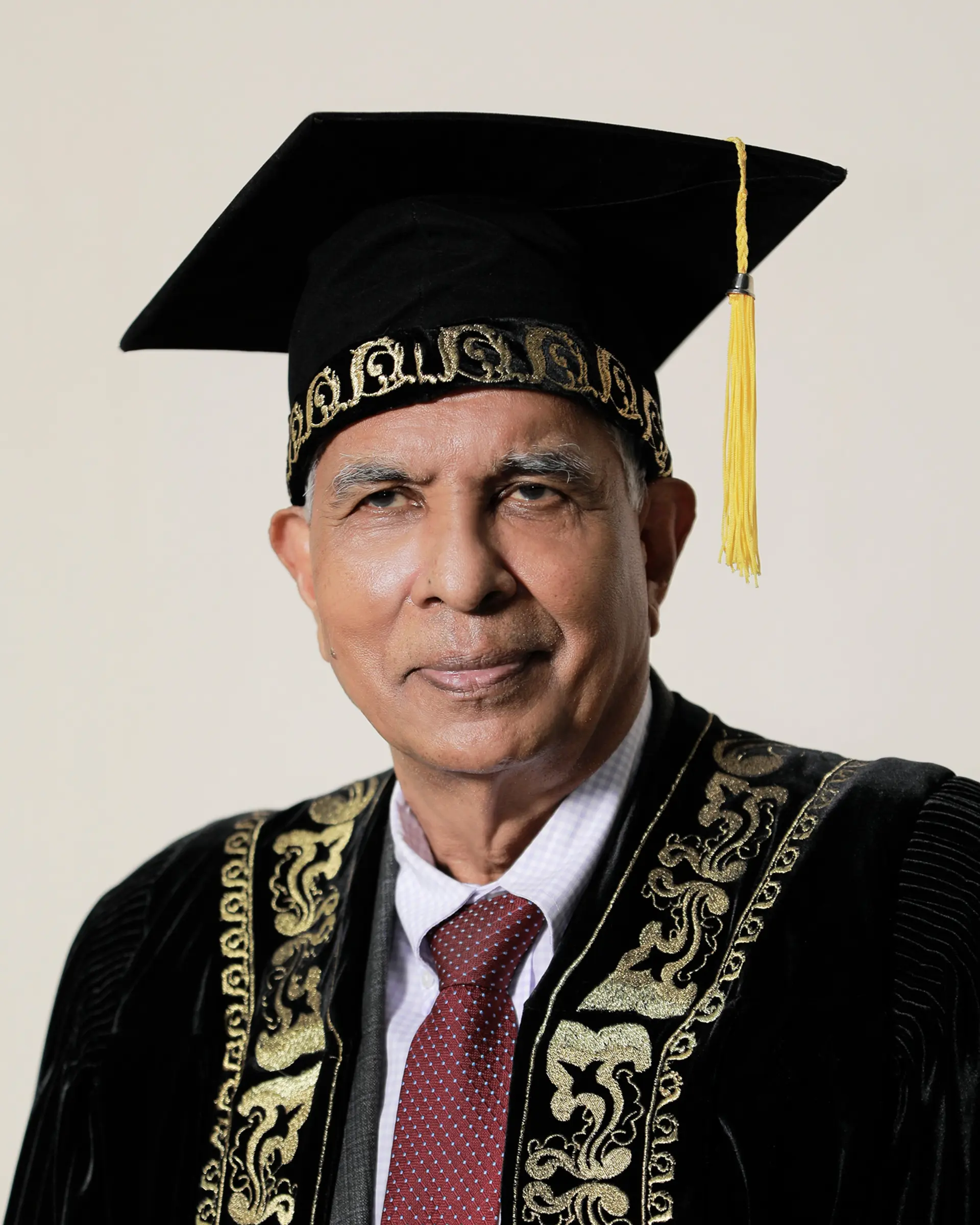
Chancellor of the University of Vocational Technology

=== Vice chancellor ===
The Vice-Chancellor is the academic principal and administrative officer of the university, responsible for management tasks. This appointment is also done by the President of Sri Lanka. Currently, Professor K.M.G. Prasanna Premadasa has been serving as the Vice Chancellor.

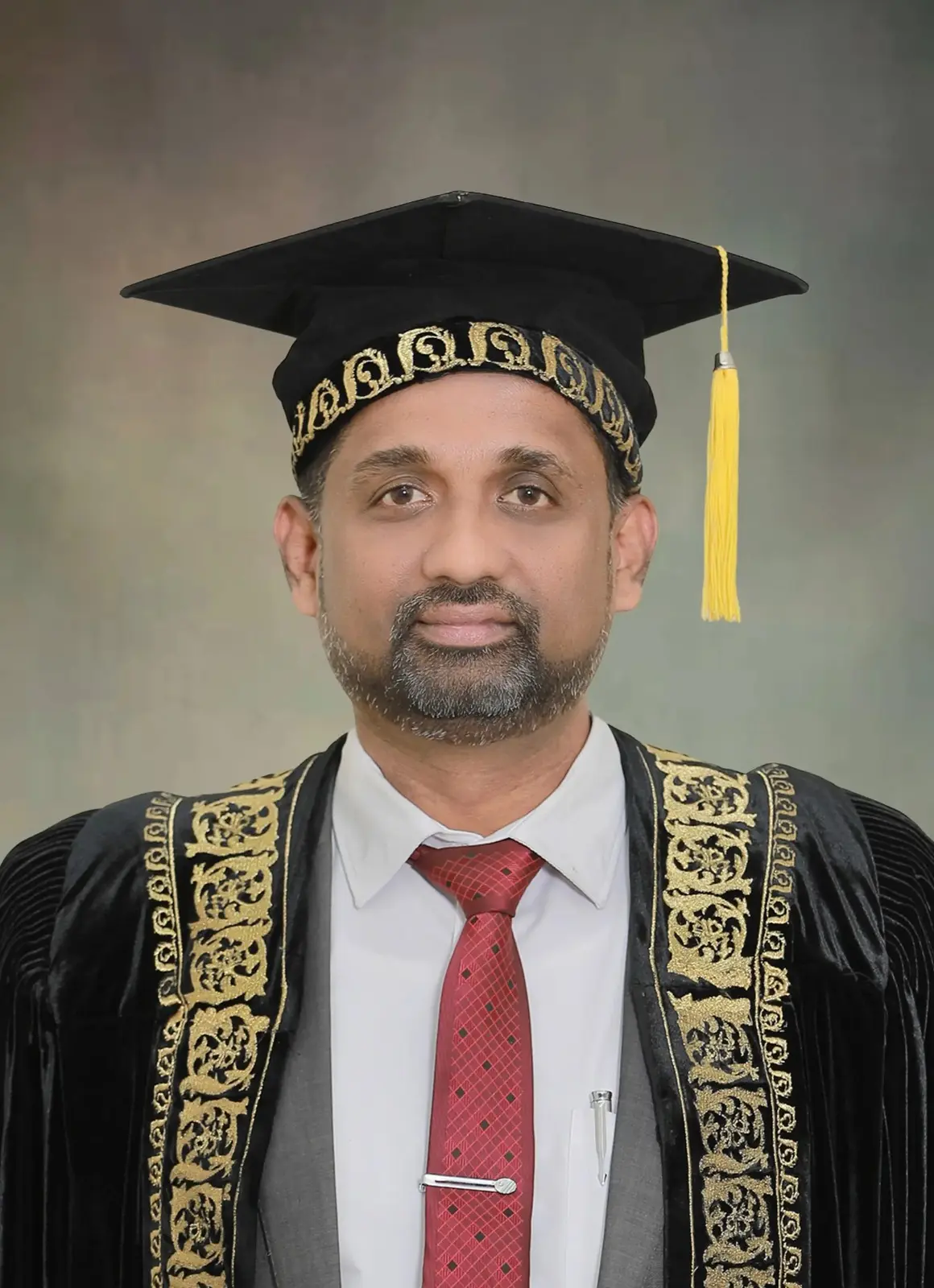
Vice Chancellor of the University of Vocational Technology

=== Board Members ===
There are board members appointed by the government for the university.

Former Vice Chancellors

- Senior Professor. Kapila Gunasekara 2009 - 2013 (4 Years)
- Dr. T. A. Piyasiri 2013 - 2016 (3 Years)
- Senior Professor G. L. D. Wickramasinghe 2016 - 2019 (3 Years)
- Senior Professor Ranjith Premalal De Silva 2020 - 2023 (3 Years)
- Professor Mahesh C Edirisinghe 2023 - 2025 (2 Years)

== Library ==
The UoVT operates a network of libraries comprising the main library at University premises. The library is open for students from 8.30 am to 4.15 pm on each day including weekends except Full Moon Poya Days and University holidays.

The library is well equipped with a substantial collection of books in a wide variety of subjects and many foreign and local journals and substantial collection of videos, audios, to supplement print material. The library provides internet facilities for study purposes of students.

In-house photocopying facilities are also available at very nominal rates for the convenience of all library users. The library has copies of past examination papers, which are also available on the university website. Students are advised to read the library information sheets available at all libraries for more details on the facilities provided and how to make use of them.

== Student organizations ==
Students at the university run over 11 clubs and organizations. These include cultural and religious groups, academic clubs, and common-interest organizations. The university University of Vocational Technology Students' Union is considered the highest body which represents all internal students.

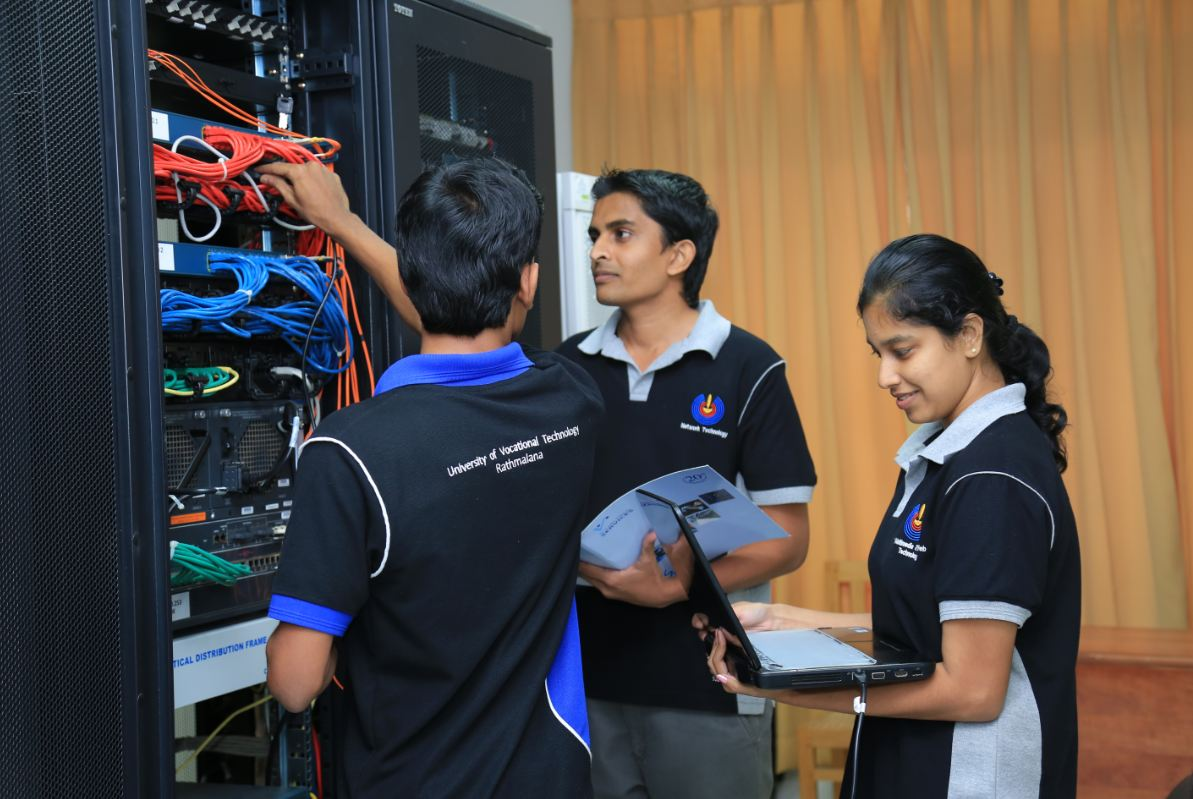

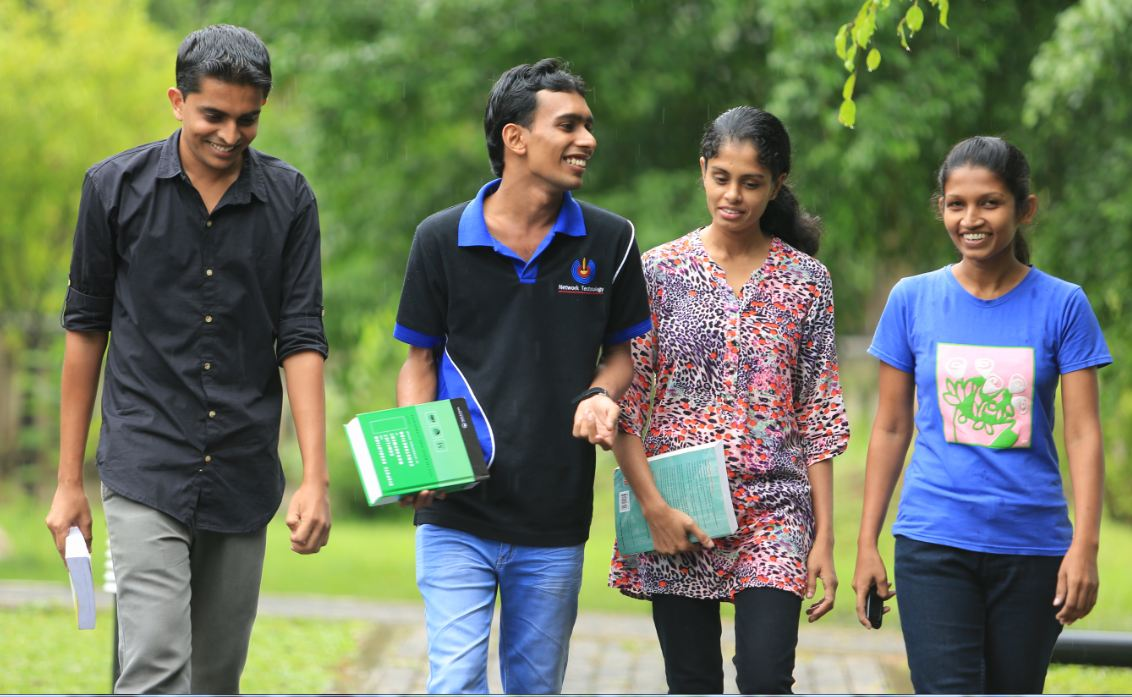

These student societies include:

- Students' Union
- සාහිත්‍ය කලා අනුකමිටුව - වෘත්තීය තාක්ෂණ විශ්වවිද්‍යාලය
- Sports Club
- IET on Campus UoVT
- Food Technology Association
- IEEE Club
- Gavel Club
- Vividra Media Club
- IMech Club
- Environment Club

== See also ==
- TVET in Sri Lanka
