= Prasanna Shamal Senarath =

Sri Lankan politician

Personal details
- Born: Sri Lanka
- Party: United National Party
- Education: Nalanda College Colombo
- Occupation: Politics
- Website: http://www.shamalsenarath.com/

Prasanna Shamal Senarath is the Opposition Leader North Western Province, Sri Lanka and the United National Party (UNP) Kurunegala District Leader.
