= Mohan De Silva (physician) =

- Born: Colombo, Sri Lanka
- Education: Nalanda College Colombo
- Occupation: Surgeon
- Known for: Chairman University Grants Commission (Sri Lanka); Dean of the Faculty of Medical Sciences University of Sri Jayewardenepura.

Mohan De Silva was the chairman of the University Grants Commission, Sri Lanka.

== Early life and education ==
De Silva received his primary school education at St. Thomas' College, Gurutalawa, before moving to Nalanda College, Colombo for his secondary education. While at school De Silva played for the first XI cricket team, as an all-rounder / right arm leg-spinner. Following which he attended the University of Ceylon, Medical Faculty in early 1970s, graduating as a medical doctor. De Silva also captained the University of Ceylon cricket team in the Sara Trophy Tournament, whilst studying medicine. De Silva holds an MBBS, MS, FRCS (Edin) and FCSSL.

== Career ==
De Silva was the Dean of the Faculty of Medical Sciences University of Sri Jayewardenepura, being a professor of surgery.

He was the 22nd President of the College of Surgeons of Sri Lanka.
