= Sarath Weerasekara =

Sri Lankan politician and filmmaker (born 1951)

Hon. Rear Admiral Sarath Weerasekara RSP, VSV, USP, MP
- සරත් වීරසේකර சரத் வீரசேகரன்

Minister of Public Security
- In office 26 November 2020 – 3 April 2022
- President: Gotabaya Rajapaksa
- Prime Minister: Mahinda Rajapaksa
- Preceded by: Office Established
- Succeeded by: Prasanna Ranatunga

Member of Parliament for Colombo District
- In office 20 August 2020 – 24 September 2024
- Majority: 328,095 Preferential Votes

Member of Parliament for Ampara District
- In office 22 April 2010 – 26 June 2015
- Majority: 54,373 Preferential Votes

Personal details
- Born: 29 October 1951 (age 74) Colombo, Sri Lanka
- Party: Sri Lanka Podujana Peramuna
- Domestic partner: Hemanthi Weerasekera
- Relations: Major General Ananda Weerasekara
- Education: Nalanda College, Colombo; Ananda College; University of Kelaniya
- Profession: Politician
- Website: sarathweerasekera.com

Military service
- Allegiance: Sri Lanka
- Branch/service: Sri Lanka Navy
- Years of service: 1971 - 2006
- Rank: Rear admiral
- Battles/wars: Sri Lankan Civil War
- Awards: Rana Sura Padakkama; Vishista Seva Vibhushanaya; Uttama Seva Padakkama

Rear Admiral Sarath Weerasekara, RSP, VSV, USP, MP is a retired Sri Lankan admiral, politician and a filmmaker. He was a former Cabinet Minister of Public Security and a State Minister of Provincial Councils and Local Government Affairs, member of parliament and former Deputy Minister of Labour and Labour Relations. He had served as the Deputy Chief of Staff of the Sri Lanka Navy and first Director General of the Civil Security Force.

== Minister of Public Security ==
In March 2021, Weerasekara announced plans to ban the burqas in Sri Lanka and the closure of more than 1,000 Islamic schools over ‘national security’ fears.

== Awards ==
In order of precedence:

- Rana Sura Padakkamam
- Vishista Seva Vibhushanaya
- Uttama Seva Padakkama

== As a filmmaker ==
Year	Film	Ref.
2011	Gamani	
2024	Sri Siddha	
