= Ananda Weerasekara =

Sri Lankan general (1943–2021)

Major General Ananda Weerasekara RWP, USP
- Born: 29 April 1943
- Died: 28 December 2021 (aged 78)
- Military career
- Allegiance: Sri Lanka
- Branch: Sri Lanka Army
- Service years: 1964–1998
- Rank: Major general
- Unit: Sri Lanka Sinha Regiment
- Conflicts: 1971 Insurrection, Sri Lankan Civil War, 1987–1989 JVP insurrection
- Awards: Rana Wickrama Padakkama, Uttama Seva Padakkama
- Other work: Commissioner General for Rehabilitation; Deputy Chairman of Airport and Aviation Services

Major General Ananda G. Weerasekara, RWP, USP (29 April 1943 – 28 December 2021) was a Sri Lankan military officer and monk. He served as the Military Coordinating Officer of the North Central Province during the 1987–1989 JVP insurrection and Commissioner General for Rehabilitation.

Born to Mendis and Sumana Weerasekera, he was the eldest of six siblings which includes Rear Admiral Sarath Weerasekara. He was educated at Nalanda College, Colombo and enlisted in the Ceylon Army in 1964 as a cadet officer and was commissioned a Second Lieutenant in the 1st Battalion, Ceylon Sinha Regiment following his basic training. He saw active service during the 1971 JVP Insurrection. In 1986, Lieutenant Colonel Weerasekara served as the commanding officer of the 4th Battalion, Sri Lanka Sinha Regiment. He then served as the first commanding officer of the newly formed 6th Battalion, Sri Lanka Sinha Regiment from 1987 to 1988. During the 1987–1989 JVP insurrection, Weerasekara served as the Military Coordinating Officer for the North Central Province and in 1990 served as the Commissioner General for Rehabilitation. He was implicated in 1997 in the Presidential Commission of Inquiry into the death of Lieutenant General Denzil Kobbekaduwa, Weerasekara along with Major General Vijaya Wimalaratne was accused of murdering Kobbekaduwa. Following his retirement from the army in 1998 with the rank of Major General, he served as Deputy Chairman of Airport and Aviation Services and was active in local nationalist politics associated with Sinhala Veera Vidahana which had links to the Sihala Urumaya.

In 2000 he was arrested by police on accusations of the torture and murder of JVP suspects in 1989 in Anuradhapura.

On 1 May 2007, he entered the Buddangala Ananda, a Buddhist monastic order. Ven. Buddangala Ananda Thera died on 28 December 2021, at the age of 78.
