= Saman Ediriweera =

- Born: Sri Lanka
- Education: Nalanda College Colombo
- Occupation: Engineer
- Employer: Sri Lanka
- Known for: former Chairman Sri Lanka Rupavahini Corporation

Saman Ediriweera (also known as S. Saman Ediriweera) is the current Chairman of Airport & Aviation Services (Sri Lanka) Limited (AASL).

== Early life and education ==
After receiving his education from Nalanda College, Colombo, Ediriweera entered University of Sri Lanka in 1972 and graduated with a B.Sc in Electronics and Telecommunications Engineering. He is also one of the first batch of engineering students at Moratuwa University.

== Professional career ==
Ediriweera has served Sri Lanka in the capacity of Secretary Ministry of Telecommunications, Chairman of Telecommunication Regulatory Commission (TRC), Secretary Ministry of Tertiary Education and Training, Director Policy Planning at Sri Lanka Telecom and Director of Telecommunications at the Ministry of Posts, Telecommunications and the Media., Chairman of Sri Lanka Rupavahini Corporation, Director General of Sri Lanka Rupavahini Corporation, Director of Sri Lanka Rupavahini Corporation,

== General References ==
- Emirate Group Careers
- Diploma Awards 2015
- Sinhala and Hindu New Year Celebrations at BIA-2016
