= Uva Wellassa University =

Sri Lankan national university

Uva Wellassa University of Sri Lanka
- ශ්‍රී ලංකා ඌව වෙල්ලස්ස විශ්වවිද්‍යාලය
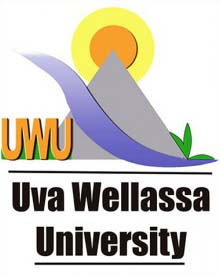
- Uva Wellassa University Logo
- Motto: Centre of Excellence for Value Addition
- Type: Public
- Established: 1 July 2005; 21 years ago
- Accreditation: University Grants Commission (Sri Lanka)
- Academic affiliations: University Grants Commission (Sri Lanka), Association of Commonwealth Universities, International Association of Universities
- Chancellor: Professor Jayantha Balawardane
- Vice-Chancellor: Senior Professor Kolitha Bandara Wijesekara
- Students: 3000
- Undergraduates: 2,900
- Postgraduates: 50
- Location: Badulla, 90000, Sri Lanka
- Sporting affiliations: Sri Lanka University Games
- Website: www.uwu.ac.lk

Uva Wellassa University (abbreviated as UWU) is a Sri Lankan national university located in the city of Badulla. The university was established in 2005 and is one of Sri Lanka's national universities, serving the Uva Province. It comprises six faculties, including Animal Sciences and Export Agriculture, Applied Sciences Management, Technological Studies and Medicine.

== History ==
=== Establishment and Development ===
This public university in the Uva Province of Sri Lanka was founded on 1 July 2005, to address the educational needs of the region. The campus occupies 35 acres of land, with the original plan covering 59 acres due to the challenging mountainous terrain. The Central Engineering Consultancy Bureau (CECB) oversaw the design and development of the campus with cabinet approval in October 2004.

The inception of UWU was the result of collaborative efforts, including an influential report by Professor H.P.M. Gunasena and a concept paper drafted by a Coordinating Committee led by Mr. Chandra Embuldeniya. The University Grants Commission (UGC) endorsed this innovative model for university establishment, and Mr. Embuldeniya was appointed Vice Chancellor in July 2005.

Core facilities, including lecture halls and computer labs, were operational by December 2006, marking the completion of various blocks and the Administration Block, despite facing obstacles like legal issues and relocation delays.

President Chandrika Kumaratunga formally recognized the university's establishment in 2007, and Sri Lankan President Mahinda Rajapaksa officially inaugurated the campus on 5 August 2009.

=== Achievements and Growth ===
UWU is the 14th National University in the Sri Lankan State University system and is known as the nation's first all-entrepreneurial institution. It started its academic journey in 2006 with 153 students in 5 programs and has since expanded. Today, UWU caters to 2908 undergraduates through 13 programs offered by 4 faculties and has a staff of 337. The university now offers postgraduate courses, external degree programs, diploma courses, and open and distance learning programs, contributing to Sri Lanka's higher education landscape.

== Governance and Administration ==
Uva Wellassa University is a state university and depends on the government for its annual grant, which is provided by the University Grants Commission (UGC). Undergraduate education is free, and its governance is guided by the Universities Act No. 16 of 1978, the Universities (Amendment) Act No. 7 of 1985, and its own by-laws.

The university's administration follows a dual structure, including the Council (formerly known as the University Court) as the governing body and the Academic Senate for academic affairs. Appointments to officers and faculty are made with recommendations from the UGC.

=== Officers of the university ===
Chancellor

The chancellor is the head of the university and awards all degrees, although the vice-chancellor carries out most duties. The president of Sri Lanka makes the appointment to a distinguished person in academics, clergy or civil society. The chancellor is Professor Jayantha Balawardane (Professor in Oncology, Executive Director, University Hospital KDU).

Vice-chancellor

Vice-Chancellor is the Principal Executive Officer and Principal Academic Officer of the university, appointed by the President of Sri Lanka. The Vice-Chancellor is Senior Professor Kolitha Bandara Wijesekara. Further, Vice-chancellor is the ex-officio Chairman of both the Council and the Senate of the university.

== Faculties and undergraduate courses ==
As of 2023, the university's four faculties offer 13 undergraduate degree programs.

=== Faculty of Animal Science & Export Agriculture ===
- Department of Animal Science
  - B.Sc. in Aquatic Resources & Technology
  - B.Sc. in Animal Production and Food Technology (Formerly, BAScHons - Bachelor of Animal Science Honours in Animal Science)
- Department of Export Agriculture
  - B.Sc. in Export Agriculture
  - B.Sc. in Palm & Latex Technology and Value Addition
  - B.Sc. in Tea Technology & Value Addition

=== Faculty of Applied Sciences ===
- Department of Applied Earth Sciences
  - B.Sc. in Water Science & Technology
  - B.Sc. in Mineral Resources & Technology
- Department of Computer Science & Informatics
  - B.Sc. in Computer Science & Technology
  - Bachelor of Industrial Information Technology
- Department of Science & Technology
  - B.Sc. in Science & Technology

=== Faculty of Management ===
- Department of Management Sciences
  - B.BM in Entrepreneurship and Management Studies
- Department of Public Administration
  - B.BM in Human Resource Development
- Department of Tourism Studies
  - B.BM in Hospitality, Tourism & Events Management
- Department of English Language Teaching
  - Bachelor of Arts Honours in English Language & Applied Linguistics Degree Programme

=== Faculty of Technological studies ===
- Department of Biosystems Technology
  - Bachelor of Biosystems Technology (BBST)
- Department of Engineering Technology
  - Bachelor of Engineering Technology (BET) in Mechanical Engineering
- Department of Information and Communication Technology
  - Bachelor of Information and Communication Technology(BICT)

=== Faculty of Medicine ===
MBBS

== Post graduate courses ==
The university currently offers one post-graduate degree program.

- Postgraduate Diploma in Actuarial Science

== Short term courses ==
The university offers more than 12 short-term courses and two certificate courses in Java Applications Development and Web Design.

== Accommodations ==
The university offers hostel accommodations predominantly for its 1st, 3rd, and 4th-year students. In 2020, 1,755 of these students were accommodated, using both university-owned and rented facilities. The annual fees range from Rs. 3,500 for rented to Rs. 5,000 for on-campus accommodations. The university's establishment in Badulla has invigorated the local economy through rental opportunities, heightened demand for services, and job creation, underlining its role as an economic catalyst in the region.
