= Udaya Ranawaka =

Sri Lankan surgeon

Professor Udaya Ranawaka
- Born: Sri Lanka
- Education: Nalanda College Colombo
- Occupation: Neuro Physician
- Employer: University of Kelaniya
- Known for: Neurology

Prof Udaya Ranawaka (also known as Udaya K. Ranawaka) is a Senior Consultant Neurologist to the North Colombo Teaching Hospital(NCTH), Ragama, and Senior Lecturer at the Faculty of Medicine, University of Kelaniya,

== Early life and education ==
Ranawaka was educated at Nalanda College, Colombo.

He holds MBBS, from North Colombo Medical College, Doctor of Medicine, MRCP, FRCP London, Fellow of American Academy of Neurology, Fellow of American Heart Association.

== Other positions ==
Ranawaka is the President of Ceylon College of Physicians.

Ranawaka is the President of the National Stroke Association of Sri Lanka (NSASL), an Honorary Secretary for The Sri Lanka Clinical Trials Registry (SLCTR) and a former President of National Stroke Association Sri Lanka.
