= Psc (military) =

Post-nominal for Post Staff College in Commonwealth militaries

psc is a post-nominal for Post Staff College (formally Passed Staff College) in the Commonwealth militaries of Bangladesh, Pakistan, Sri Lanka, India, New Zealand, and the United Kingdom. It indicates that an officer has undertaken the staff officer course at a staff college.

== United Kingdom ==
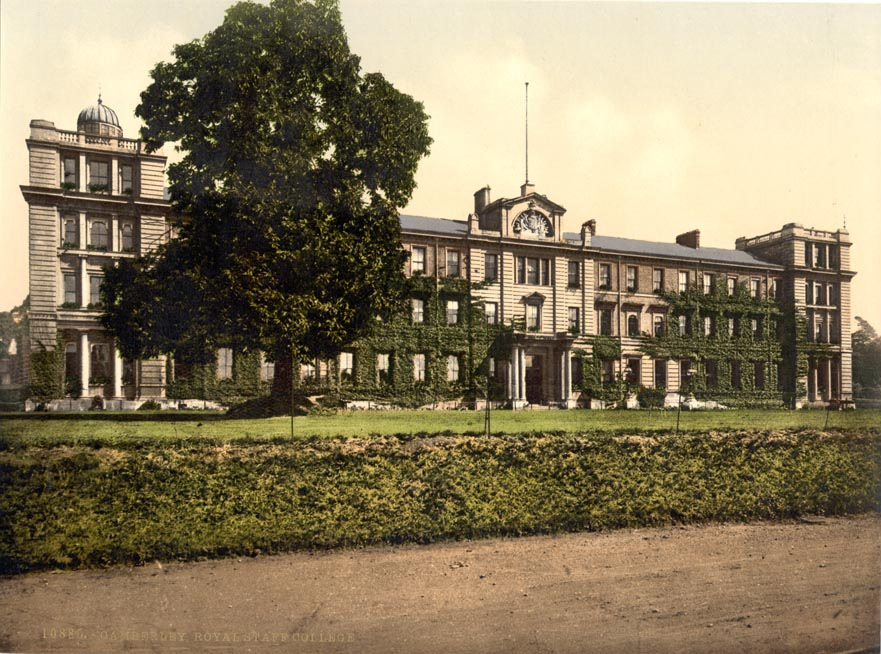
The old Staff College, Camberley

The practice originated in the British Army where the initials psc appeared in the service lists denoting that the officer had attended the Staff College, Camberley. Royal Navy officers who attended the staff course at Royal Naval College, Greenwich and RAF officers who attended the RAF Staff College, Bracknell also used the qualification. Since the 1997 amalgamation of staff training officers now receive the letters psc(j) from the Joint Services Command and Staff College as Post Staff College (Joint)(United Kingdom) (psc(j)(UK)) after completing the Advanced Command and Staff Course. British officers also receive the letters psc(nation) or psc(j)(nation) from attendance at overseas staff colleges, where the (nation) is substituted for the NATO abbreviation of that country, i.e., attendance at the French 'l'Ecole de Guerre' results in psc(j)(FRA).

== Bangladesh ==
PSC is used for Bangladesh Armed Forces officers who have attended the Defence Services Command & Staff College (DSCSC), Bangladesh. The college is acclaimed internationally as a centre of excellence for study on subjects of contemporary military interest, and has graduated over 5979 officers, including 1300+ officers from 44 different countries.

== Pakistan ==
In Pakistan the initials psc are used by officers who attended the Pakistan Command and Staff College, Quetta.

== Sri Lanka ==
In Sri Lanka, the initials psc are used by Army, Navy and Air Force officers who have gained the Pass Staff College status from a recognized a staff college such as the Defence Services Command and Staff College or an equivalent staff college of an allied nation. Such officers are eligible to wear the passed staff college (psc) badge.

== Malaysia ==
Officers who graduated from the Malaysian Armed Forces Staff College, Kuala Lumpur use the initials psc.

== India ==
The initials psc are used by officers who attended the Defence Services Staff College, Wellington.

== Namibia ==
Officers who graduated from the Senior Command and Staff Course at the Namibia Command and Staff College use the initials psc.

== New Zealand ==
Officers graduated from the New Zealand Defence Force Advanced Command and Staff Course (Joint) use the post-nominals psc(j).

== See also ==
- College of Defence Management
