= 2015 Sri Lankan presidential election =

- 8 January 2015
- Turnout: 81.52% (▲7.02pp)
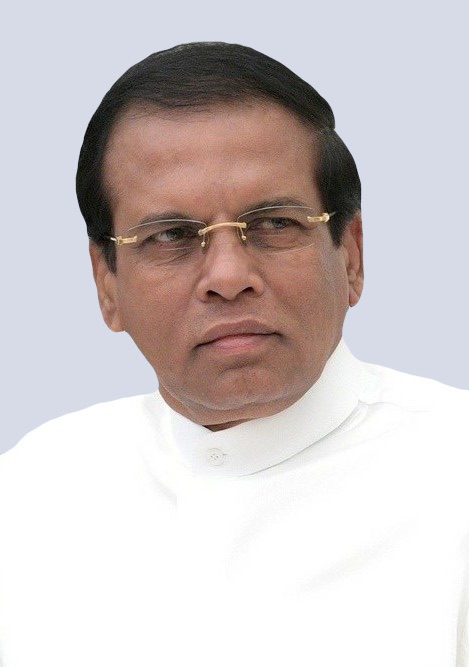

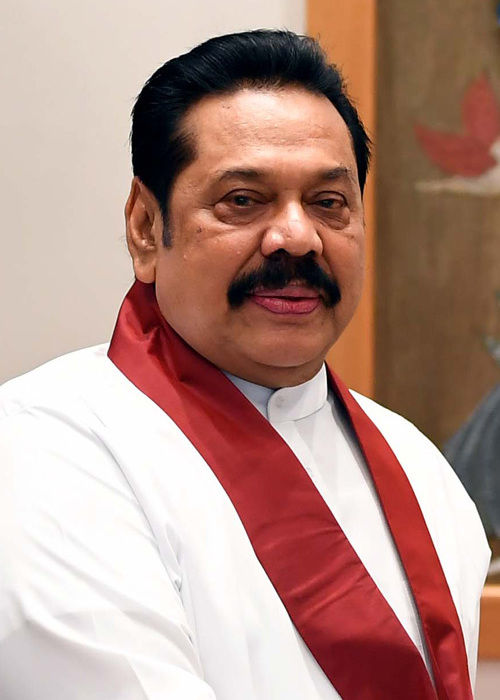
Nominee	Maithripala Sirisena	Mahinda Rajapaksa
Party	NDF	SLFP
Alliance	—	UPFA
Popular vote	6,217,162	5,768,090
Percentage	51.28%	47.58%
- Results by polling division
President before election
Mahinda Rajapaksa
SLFP
Elected President
Maithripala Sirisena
NDF

Presidential elections were held in Sri Lanka on 8 January 2015, nearly two years ahead of schedule. Incumbent president Mahinda Rajapaksa was the candidate of the ruling United People's Freedom Alliance, seeking a third term in office after presidential term limits were abolished in 2010 by the 18th amendment to the constitution. The New Democratic Front, a United National Party-led opposition coalition, chose to field Maithripala Sirisena, former Minister of Health in Rajapaksa's government and general secretary of the Sri Lanka Freedom Party – the main constituent party of the UPFA – as its common opposition candidate.

Sirisena was declared the winner, receiving 51% of the vote compared to Rajapaksa's 48%. The result was generally seen as a major upset; when Rajapaksa called the election in November 2014 he had looked certain to win. On 11 January 2015, the new government announced a special investigation into allegations of an attempted coup by Rajapaksa.

== Timeline ==
2014

- 20 October – Minister of Mass Media and Information Keheliya Rambukwella confirms that the election will be held in January 2015.
- 5 November – Rajapaksa seeks the Supreme Court's opinion on whether he could stand for re-election.
- 20 November – Rajapaksa issues a proclamation calling for a presidential election at which he would seek re-election.
- 21 November – Sri Lanka Freedom Party general secretary Maithripala Sirisena defects to the opposition and announces that he will run against Rajapaksa in the upcoming election. Election commissioner Mahinda Deshapriya announces that nominations would be accepted on 8 December 2014 and that the election would be held on 8 January 2015.
- 8 December – The nomination period is opened by the Elections Department on 8 December 2014. All nominations are accepted.
- 23–24 December – Postal voting begins for two days.

2015

- 8 January – Election day. Polling stations opened at 07:00 (01:30 UTC) and closed at 16:00 (10:30 UTC).
- 9 January – Rajapaksa concedes defeat ahead of the final result.
- 9 January – The election commissioner confirms Maithripala Sirisena's victory in the election at 12:00 (6:30 UTC).
- 9 January – Maithripala Sirsena is sworn in as Sri Lanka's sixth executive president, and seventh overall, before Supreme Court judge K. Sripavan in Independence Square, Colombo at 18:20 (12:50 UTC).

== Background ==
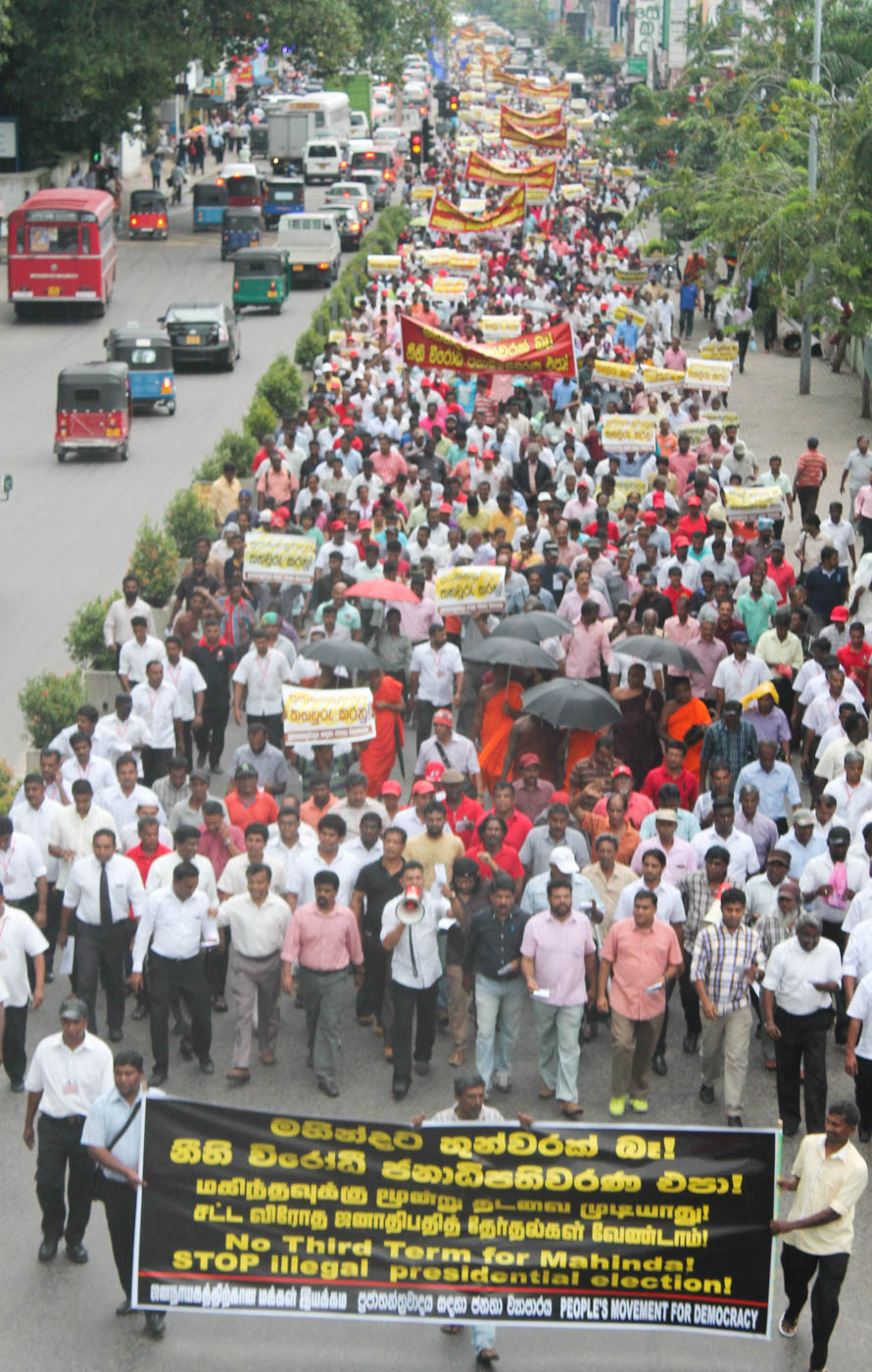
Protests against Rajapaksa seeking a third term, 18 November 2014

According to the constitution, the normal term of office for a president is six years, although an incumbent serving a second term may call an election at any time after four years in office. In November 2009, buoyed by the government's defeat of the rebel Liberation Tigers of Tamil Eelam in May 2009, incumbent Mahinda Rajapaksa called an early presidential election. In the elections held in January 2010, Rajapaksa easily secured a second term in office, defeating common opposition candidate Sarath Fonseka. In February 2010, the Supreme Court ruled that Rajapaksa's second term would begin in November 2010, and Rajapaksa was accordingly sworn in on 19 November 2010, in accordance with the Third Amendment to the Constitution.

In September 2010, parliament, which was controlled by Rajapaksa's UPFA, passed the eighteenth amendment to the constitution, removing the two term limit on presidents, allowing Rajapaksa to run for a third term. As a result, he was constitutionally eligible to call an early presidential election after completing four years of his term.

There was speculation in mid-2014 that Rajapaksa would call another early presidential election. On 20 October 2014, Minister of Mass Media and Information Keheliya Rambukwella confirmed that the election would be held in January 2015 as Rajapaksa would complete four years of his second term on 19 November 2014. Critics of Rajapaksa, including the Bar Association and former Chief Justice Sarath N. Silva, argued that he could not stand for re-election as he had won his second term before the eighteenth amendment to the constitution had been passed. In early November 2014, Rajapaksa sought the Supreme Court's opinion on whether he could stand for re-election. The court ruled that Rajapaksa could stand for re-election. The independence of the Supreme Court has been questioned, since the UPFA impeached former Chief Justice Shirani Bandaranayake, allowing Rajapaksa to appoint an ally and legal adviser, former Attorney General Mohan Peiris, as Chief Justice.

On 20 November 2014, Rajapaksa issued a proclamation calling for a presidential election at which he would seek re-election. The following day, election commissioner Mahinda Deshapriya announced that nominations would be taken on 8 December 2014 and that the election would be held on 8 January 2015. Nominations were accepted from 09:00 to 11:00 on 8 December 2014.

15,044,490 Sri Lankans were eligible to vote at the election. Postal voting was held on 23 and 24 December 2014. Foreign monitors were invited to observe the election but not from the United Nations.

=== Electoral system ===
The Sri Lankan president is elected using a form of instant-runoff voting. Voters can rank up to three candidates, and if no candidate wins a majority in the first round of voting, the second and third preference votes from ballots whose first preference candidate was eliminated are used to determine the winner. There are 12,314 polling stations in the 22 electoral districts.

=== Concurrent events ===
Papal visit

The election had caused uncertainty over the planned visit of Pope Francis to Sri Lanka, due to take place from 13 to 15 January 2015. Prior to the election being called, the Catholic Church in Sri Lanka had urged all sides not to politicise the papal visit. After the election had been called, posters appeared showing the Pope blessing Rajapaksa. The Catholic Church condemned the posters and called for their removal.

2014–15 floods

In the last two weeks of December 2014, the Central, Eastern and Northern Provinces of Sri Lanka were hit by the worst floods since 1956, resulting in several deaths and the displacement of over one million people. Some local election monitoring groups expressed concerns that the displaced would be unable to vote at the election. However, the Election Commissioner said that no candidate, their representative or lawyers had complained and that there was no reason to postpone the election.

== Candidates ==
Nineteen nominations were received from by the Elections Department on 8 December 2014, all of which were accepted. Seventeen candidates were from registered political parties and two were independents.

=== Mahinda Rajapaksa ===
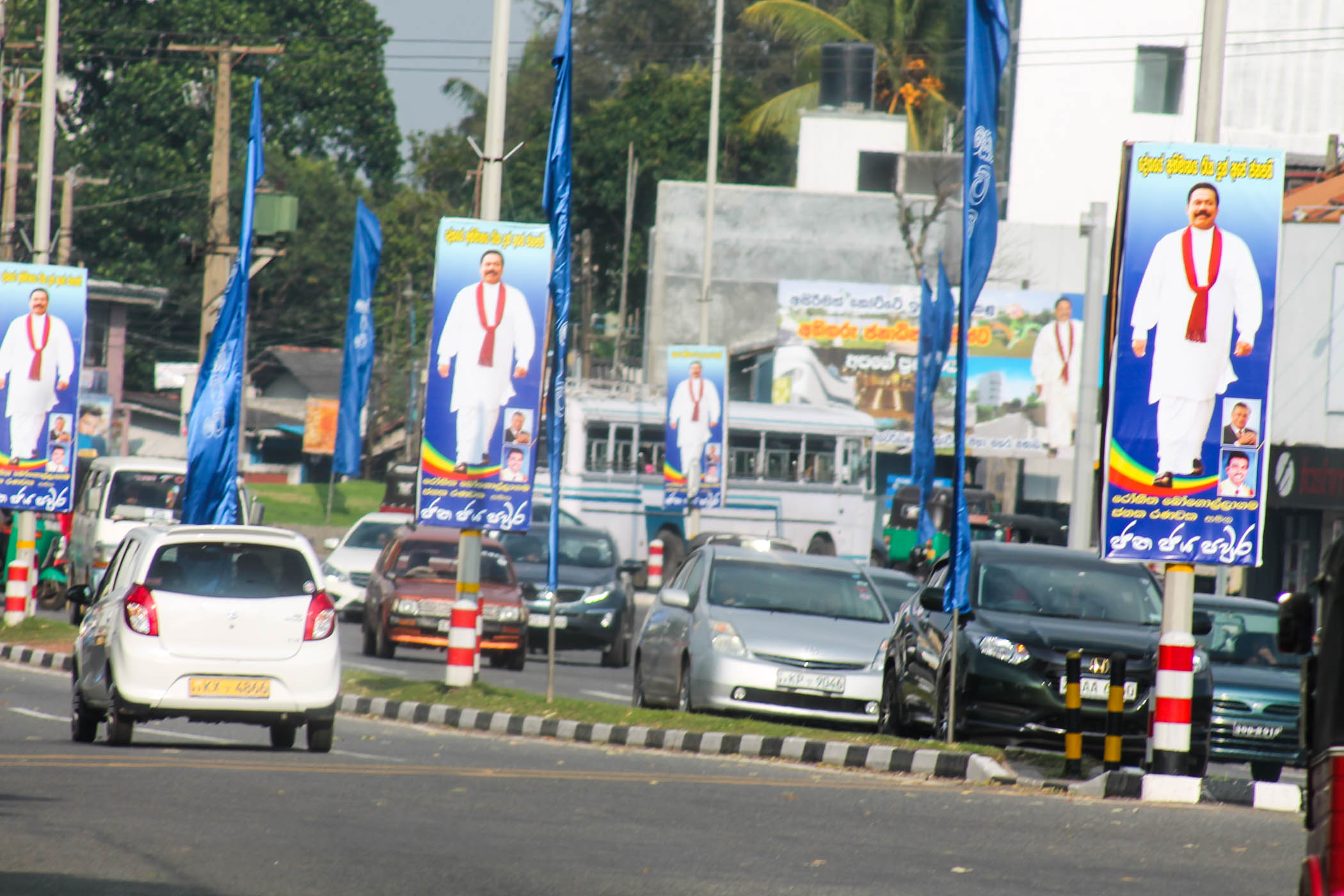
Rajapaksa election posters

The incumbent Mahinda Rajapaksa ran as the UPFA candidate, seeking an unprecedented third term. He also received the endorsement of a number of small constituent parties of the UPFA including the Ceylon Workers' Congress, Communist Party, Lanka Sama Samaja Party, National Freedom Front, National Union of Workers, and the Up-Country People's Front. On nomination day, two opposition MPs, Tissa Attanayake and Jayantha Ketagoda, defected to the government to support Rajapaksa. Attanayake was later appointed Minister of Health — the post previously held by Sirisena. Rajapaksa had also received the support of Buddhist extremist group Bodu Bala Sena.

The Jathika Hela Urumaya withdrew from UPFA government on 18 November 2014, citing Rajapaksa's refusal to reform the executive presidency and enact reforms to promote accountability. After much hesitation, the All Ceylon Muslim Congress and Sri Lanka Muslim Congress also withdrew from the UPFA government, on 22 and 28 December 2014 respectively, blaming the government's failure to protect Sri Lankan Muslims from Sinhalese Buddhist extremists.

Rajapaksa released his manifesto, titled Mahinda's Vision — The World Winning Path, on 23 December 2014 at the Bandaranaike Memorial International Conference Hall. In the manifesto, Rajapaksa pledges to introduce a new constitution within one year of being elected, but no abolition of the executive presidency — it will instead be amended and the "weakness" in the parliamentary system eliminated. A naval force and a special security force would be set up, with the help of the army, to tackle drug trafficking and other organised crime. The manifesto also pledges to establish a transparent, judicial inquiry into alleged war crimes during the final stages of the Sri Lankan civil war, but Rajapaksa refused to co-operate with UN investigation.

=== Maithripala Sirisena ===
Swan symbol of the New Democratic Front, also used by Common opposition Presidential candidate Sarath Fonseka in 2010.

In the run up to the election being called, several names had been suggested for nomination as the common opposition candidate: former president Chandrika Kumaratunga, UNP leader Ranil Wickremesinghe, UNP Leadership Council Chairman Karu Jayasuriya, former Chief Justice Shirani Bandaranayake and leader of the National Movement for Social Justice Maduluwawe Sobitha Thero. However, on 21 November 2014, after the election had been called, Maithripala Sirisena was revealed as the common opposition candidate by the UNP. Sirisena had been Minister of Health in Rajapaksa's government and general secretary of the SLFP before defecting to the opposition coalition. Sirisena immediately received the support of former president Chandrika Kumaratunga and several UPFA MPs that had defected alongside him (Duminda Dissanayake, M. K. D. S. Gunawardena, Wasantha Senanayake, Rajitha Senaratne, Rajiva Wijesinha). Sirisena and the other UPFA MPs were stripped of their ministerial positions and expelled from the SLFP. On 30 November, minister Navin Dissanayake resigned from the UPFA government and defected to the opposition to support Sirisena. Two deputy ministers, Palani Digambaran and Velusami Radhakrishnan, resigned from the UPFA government on 10 December 2014 to support Sirisena. Two other deputy ministers, Faiszer Musthapha and Nandimithra Ekanayake, resigned from the UPFA government on 31 December 2014 and 1 January 2015 respectively, to support Sirisena. Sirisena received the support of UPFA MP Achala Jagodage on 2 January 2015.

Sirisena pledged to abolish the executive presidency within 100 days of being elected, repeal the controversial eighteenth amendment, re-instate the seventeenth amendment and appoint UNP leader Ranil Wickremasinghe as Prime Minister. On 1 December 2014, Sirisena signed a memorandum of understanding (MOU) with 36 opposition parties and civic groups promising to abolish the executive presidency, hold parliamentary elections, form an all-party national government and carry out various political reforms. Signatories to the MOU included the UNP, Sarath Fonseka's Democratic Party, Democratic People's Front, Azath Salley's Muslim Tamil National Alliance, Free Media Movement, Federation of University Teachers Association as well as dissident groups of the LSSP and Communist Party. The following day, the JHU announced that it would support Sirisena in the presidential election. On 30 December 2014 the Tamil National Alliance, the largest political party representing the Sri Lankan Tamil people, endorsed Sirisena.

Sirisena contested as a New Democratic Front (NDF) candidate under its swan symbol, just as common opposition candidate Sarath Fonseka had done in the previous election.

Sirisena released his manifesto, titled A Compassionate Maithri Governance — A Stable Country, on 19 December 2014 during a rally at Viharamahadevi Park. The main pledge in his manifesto was the replacement of the executive presidency with a Westminster style cabinet, but the manifesto acknowledged that Sirisena would need the support of the parliament to amend the constitution. The manifesto also makes a commitment to replace the open list proportional representation system with a mixture of first-past-the-post and PR for electing MPs. Independent commissions would be established to oversee the judiciary, police, elections department, Auditor-General's Department and Attorney-General's Department. The Commission on Bribery and Corruption would be strengthened and political diplomatic appointments annulled. Populist measures in the manifesto included a commitment to write-off 50% of farmers' loans, reduce fuel prices by removing taxes and a salary increase of Rs.10,000 for public servants. Public spending on health would increase from 1.8% of GDP to 3% of GDP whilst that on education would increase from 1.7% of GDP to 6% of GDP. The manifesto also stated that the casino licences granted to Kerry Packer's Crown Resort and John Keells Holdings's Water Front would be cancelled. Political victims during Rajapaks's rule, such as Sarath Fonseka and Shirani Bandaranayake, would be re-appointed.

In a separate document, Sirisena pledged that, whilst resisting any international investigation, he would establish an independent domestic inquiry into the alleged war crimes during the final stages of the Sri Lankan civil war.

=== Minor candidates ===
The remaining seventeen candidates were from minor political parties or independents.

Candidate	Party	Symbol	Notes
Wimal Geenage	Sri Lanka National Front		Rajapaksa dummy candidate.
Aithurus M. Illias	Independent		Former SLMC MP for Jaffna. Presidential candidate in 2010 (endorsed Sarath Fonseka).
Siritunga Jayasuriya	United Socialist Party		Presidential candidate in 2005 and 2010.
Jayantha Kulathunga	United Lanka Great Council		Rajapaksa dummy candidate.
A. S. P. Liyanage	Sri Lanka Labour Party		Presidential candidate in 2010. Rajapaksa dummy candidate.
Sundaram Mahendran	Nava Sama Samaja Party		Sirisena dummy candidate.
Sarath Manamendra	New Sinhala Heritage		Presidential candidate in 2010. Endorsed Mahinda Rajapaksa on 30 December 2014.
Maulawi Ibrahim Mohanmed Mishlar	United Peace Front		
Duminda Nagamuwa	Frontline Socialist Party		Propaganda Secretary of the Frontline Socialist Party.
Ruwanthileke Peduru	United Lanka People's Party		
Anurudha Polgampola	Independent		Former JVP/UPFA MP for Kegalle.
Prasanna Priyankara	Democratic National Movement		
Namal Ajith Rajapaksa	Our National Front		
Battaramulle Seelarathana	Jana Setha Peramuna	Tractor	Presidential candidate in 2010 (endorsed Mahinda Rajapaksa).
Ratnayake Arachchige Sirisena	Patriotic National Front		
Muthu Bandara Theminimulla	All Are Citizens, All Are Kings Organisation		Presidential candidate in 2010.
Pani Wijesiriwardene	Socialist Equality Party		

Many of the minor candidates were merely "dummy candidates" for the two main candidates, who were fielded by the main candidates to obtain the maximum benefits of being a candidate, such as free slots on state television, two agents at every polling booth and assigning counting agents.

== Conduct ==
The 2015 election, like past Sri Lankan elections, was characterized by violence, misuse of state resources and other violations of election laws. Local election monitoring groups described the violations as shameless and condemned the police for their inaction. The government accused some local election monitoring groups of being biased in favour of Sirisena and of being funded by foreign countries. The International Crisis Group warned that the tighter the election, the more violent it would be, and in the event that Rajapaksa lost, he may turn to the military or the "politically-compliant" Supreme Court to retain power. However, Rajapaksa stated that, although he expected not to lose, he would hand over power peacefully should he do so. UN Secretary-General Ban Ki-moon called on the Sri Lankan government to ensure "the peaceful and credible conduct" of the election. Commonwealth Secretary-General Kamalesh Sharma called for "transparency, a level playing field, and adherence to the laws and norms that govern a credible and peaceful election". The European Union's heads of mission in Colombo issued a joint statement on 2 January 2015 calling for a "peaceful, credible and transparent" election.

By 31 December, 2014, the Campaign for Free and Fair Elections (CaFFE) had reported 1,007 incidents of election law violations, 105 of which were related to violence, including 19 incidents involving firearms. CaFFE berated the police for seemingly allowing government supporters to attack the opposition. The People's Action for Free and Fair Elections (PAFFREL) reported 730 cases of violations by 3 January 2015 including 197 incidents of violence. The Center for Monitoring Election Violence (CMEV) had recorded 420 incidents between 20 November 2014 and 5 January 2015. The police had received a total of 214 complaints by 2 January 2015 and arrested 92 people, whom were all subsequently released on bail.

According to analysts and opposition parties, Rajapaksa used the Sri Lankan military to depress opposition turnout, particularly amongst Tamils in the north and east of the country. On 4 January 2015, international election monitors reported that they had received complaints of voter intimidation and that the army had set up 400 roadblocks to prevent Tamils from voting.

After voting had finished, election commissioner Mahinda Deshapriya declared the poll to be "peaceful" and the election to be "free and fair". However, according to the CMEV, some voters in the north were prevented from voting.

=== Election monitors ===
104 election monitors from the South Asian Election Monitoring Forum, South Asian Election Monitoring Association, Asian Election Monitoring Network and the Commonwealth arrived in Sri Lanka on 27 December 2014. Monitors from the European Election Monitoring Association were also expected to be called upon. The Election Commissioner offered six election monitoring groups the opportunity to monitor the count at only 300 of the 1,200 counting centres.

After polling, Commonwealth observers said the election was not fully democratic due to the inadequate electoral and legal framework and the unequal pre-electoral environment.

=== Violence ===
A Buddhist vihara in Borella belonging to JHU MP Athuraliye Rathana Thero was attacked on 20 November 2014, two days after the JHU left the UPFA government. On the evening of 21 November 2014, UNP member Chamila Ranasinghe was shot at Maggona in Payagala, as UNP supporters celebrated the crossover of UPFA MPs to the opposition. The houses of two UNP supporters from Madampe, Milton and Sudeh Priyankara, were shot at on the night of 22/23 November 2014. The office of UNP MP M. H. A. Haleem in Mawilmada was shot at in the early hours of 25 November 2014. A rice truck belonging Sirisena's brother Dudley Sirisena and its crew were attacked in Marandagahamula on 29 November 2014. A group of UNP supporters were attacked by UPFA supporters in Gelioya on the night of 30 November 2014. UPFA local councillor Shiron Fernando, who had defected to the opposition to support Sirisena, was attacked at his home in Bolewatte near Wennappuwa.

On the morning of 17 December 2014, a stage that Sirisena had been intending to use for a rally at Wanduramba near Galle was set on fire along with a vehicle by an unidentified group, and three workers installing the stage were abducted. Three suspects were arrested but were then taken from police custody by Deputy Minister Nishantha Muthuhettigama. Despite an arrest warrant being issued for his arrest, Muthuhettigama left Sri Lanka for Singapore on 26 December 2014. He was arrested on 28 December 2014 after returning to Sri Lanka but was released the following day.

The UNP's headquarters Sirikotha was attacked on 24 December 2014 by members of the Patriotic National Front and the Federation of National Organizers (FNO), resulting in over 30 injuries on both sides. The FNO is believed to be an affiliate of the National Freedom Front, a member of the UPFA government. On 20 December 2014, UPFA supporters attempted to sabotage an opposition rally in Haputale before attacking UNP supporters, resulting in five injuries. A group of opposition activists were attacked on 21 December 2014 at the bus halt in Hambantota by government supporters led by Hambantota mayor Eraj Ravindra Fernando. Fernando was arrested the following day but released on bail on 24 December 2014. On the night of 23/24 December 2014, an unidentified group fired shots at the stage Sirisena had been intending to use for a rally at Kolonnawa. Sirisena's election office in Batticaloa was attacked on the morning of 24 December 2014 by a group of around 30 unidentified people armed with firearms and petrol bombs.

The house in Beruwala that former president Chandrika Kumaratunga and provincial councillor Hirunika Premachandra, who had defected to support Sirisena, were dining in was stoned by UPFA supporters on 26 December 2014. Later that night, clashes broke out in Beruwala between UPFA and UNP supporters, resulting in the Special Task Force being deployed to the town the following day. Sirisena's election office in Irrakandi was attacked on the night of 27/28 December 2014. On the night of 28 December 2014, Sirisena supporters were attacked following a rally at Nidangala near Mahiyangana, resulting in three injuries. A group of artists distributing leaflets for Sirisena in Kumbukgate near Kurunegala were attacked by UPFA supporters on 29 December 2014 as police officers looked on. On 30 December 2014, clashes broke out in Polonnaruwa between two groups of Buddhist monks, one supporting Rajapaksa and the other Sirisena, during which an election monitor was attacked and threatened by supporters of Deputy Minister Siripala Gamalath.

An opposition rally on 2 January 2015 in Pelmadulla was stoned by government supporters, seriously injuring at least 20, whilst Sirisena was addressing the rally. Unidentified individuals fired shots at the house of UPFA provincial councillor Lakshman Wendaruwa, who had earlier pledged support for Sirisena, on the night of 2 January 2015, injuring a security guard. As Sirisena was leaving a rally at Aralaganwila on 3 January 2015, a group of government supporters arrived in a jeep and fired shots at the rally, injuring a bystander and damaging vehicles.

On 5 January 2015, three people setting up a stage for a Sirisena rally in Kahawatta were injured when unidentified people fired shots at them. Arrest warrants were issued for three UPFA politicians, including deputy minister Premalal Jayasekara, in connection with the shooting. One of the victims, Shantha Dodamgoda, succumbed to injuries and died on 7 January 2015.

On election day, 8 January 2015, explosions were reported at three locations — Navaladi junction near Alvai, Nelukkulam Kalaimagal Maha Vidyalayam near Vavuniya and Beruwala. Two women were assaulted by UPFA supporters, including deputy minister Sarana Gunawardena, in Yatiyana.

=== Media abuse ===
On 22 November 2014, PEO TV internet protocol television network (IPTV) and Dialog TV satellite television network had reportedly blocked the Sirasa TV from broadcasting the Satana programme, which interviewed opposition candidate Sirisena and several other members of the opposition. Tisara Samal Somaratne, a journalist for Hiru TV and Ada newspaper, was attacked by UPFA supporters in Eppawala on 5 December 2014 and was later threatened by UPFA supporters whilst receiving hospital treatment.

The 30 November 2014 edition of the Ravaya newspaper contained a story claiming that the State Intelligence Service had carried out a survey which showed that the opposition candidate would win the election by 59% to 41%. The editor of the paper, K. W. Janaranjana, was later interrogated about the story by the Criminal Investigation Department. According to Ravaya, newspaper distributors had been threatened not to sell the paper.

On nomination day, 8 December 2014, all English and Sinhala language newspapers in the country carried a front-page promotion of Rajapaksa's war victory whilst Tamil language newspapers carried an advertisement showing Rajapaksa re-opening the railway line to Jaffna. All TV stations in Sri Lanka had planned to broadcast Janapathi Janahamuwa, a programme featuring Rajapaksa, on the evening of 5 January 2015, the last legal day of campaigning, which would have prevented other candidates from having access TV. However, on 5 January 2015, the district court in Kaduwela issued an enjoining order barring the stations from broadcasting the programme.

Naushad Amith, a journalist working for Wijeya Newspapers, was assaulted by government supporters in Maligawatta on 6 January 2015 as police officers stood by.

=== Misuse of state resources ===
Transparency International Sri Lanka (TISL) has documented incidents of state employees, including those from Road Development Authority and the Sri Lanka Civil Security Force, carrying out election propaganda work for the Rajapaksa campaign. TISL has also alleged that over 1,000 buses belonging to the state-owned Sri Lanka Transport Board had been used to transport people over long distances to attend Rajapaksa rallies. TISL complained to the Election Commissioner regarding state-owned TV stations (Rupavahini and Independent Television Network (ITN)) carrying live broadcasts of Rajapaksa rallies — a violation of election laws. The Election Commissioner asked the state broadcasters not to broadcast programmes supporting Rajapaksa. According to TISL, government officials distributed free mobile phones on behalf of the Rajapaksa campaign.

The UNP has alleged that employees of the state-owned Sri Lanka Ports Authority were used for election propaganda work for the Rajapaksa campaign. The Jathika Sevaka Sangamaya (a pro-UNP trade union) has alleged that more than 1,000 employees of Colombo Port were transferred to carry out election work for the Rajapaksa campaign.

Government employees were photographed by The Sunday Times putting up Rajapaksa posters on the Southern Expressway. The newspaper also reported that several senior diplomats were recalled to Sri Lanka to help with the Rajapaksa campaign. CaFFE claimed that 44 prisoners from Galle Prison were used to erect the stage for a Rajapaksa rally at Kamburupitiya on 14 December 2014. CaFFE has also alleged that senior government officials openly campaigned for Rajapaksa. Rajapaksa's manifesto launch on 23 December 2014 was broadcast live on the state-owned Rupavahini TV station. Opposition parties alleged that the army was campaigning for Rajapaksa, a charge the army denied. The army was found to have used state money to post Rajapaksa campaign propaganda to hundreds of thousands of soldiers and their families.

The Sri Lankan government denied that state resources were being used on the Rajapaksa campaign.

=== Alleged role of R&AW ===
It was alleged by Sri Lankan newspaper The Sunday Times that the Research and Analysis Wing, an Indian spy agency, had a played in role in uniting the opposition to bring about the defeat of Mahinda Rajapaksa. There had been growing concern in India over the increasing influence of its economic and military rival China in Sri Lankan affairs. Rajapaksa further upped the ante by allowing 2 Chinese submarines to dock in 2014, without informing India, in spite of a standstill agreement to this effect between India and Sri Lanka. The growing Chinese tilt of Rajapaksa was viewed by India with unease. It was alleged that R&AW Chief of Station in Colombo helped co-ordination of talks within the opposition, and convinced former prime minister Ranil Wickremesinghe not to stand against Rajapaksa, but instead to choose a common opposition candidate, who had better chances of winning. The agent was also alleged to have been in touch with Chandrika Kumaratunga, who played a key role in convincing Sirisena to be the common candidate. Further, it was alleged that the Rajapaksa government had expelled the involved R&AW Colombo station chief in the run-up to presidential election.

These allegations were denied by the Indian Government and Sri Lankan Foreign Minister Mangala Samaraweera.

== Results ==
Sirsena was declared the winner after receiving 51.28% of all votes cast compared to Rajapaksa's 47.58%. Approximately 58% of Sinhalese voters voted for Rajapaksa while 84% of minority voters voted for Sirisena. Voter turnout was 81.52%, higher than any previous Sri Lankan presidential election and significantly higher than the 2010 presidential election. Sirsena won in 12 electoral districts whilst Rajapaksa won in the remaining 10.

Rajapaksa had earlier conceded defeat after meeting Wickremesinghe and assured him of a smooth transition of power. Rajapaksa then left his official residence, the Temple Trees. He also vacated the President's House.

Sirisena was sworn in as the sixth executive president of Sri Lanka before Supreme Court judge K. Sripavan in Independence Square, Colombo at 6.20pm on 9 January 2015. Normally, it is custom for the president to be sworn in before the chief justice, however, Sirisena had refused to be sworn in before Chief Justice Mohan Peiris, who had been controversially appointed by Rajapaksa after the controversial impeachment of previous chief justice Shirani Bandaranayake. Immediately afterwards, Wickremesinghe was sworn in as Sri Lanka's new prime minister before Sirisena. After being sworn in, Sirisena stated that he would only serve a single term.

Candidate	Party	Votes	%
Maithripala Sirisena	New Democratic Front	6,217,162	51.28
Mahinda Rajapaksa	Sri Lanka Freedom Party	5,768,090	47.58
Ratnayake Arachchige Sirisena	Patriotic National Front	18,174	0.15
Namal Ajith Rajapaksa	Our National Front	15,726	0.13
Maulawi Ibrahim Mohanmed Mishlar	United Peace Front	14,379	0.12
A. S. P. Liyanage	Sri Lanka Labour Party	14,351	0.12
Ruwanthileke Peduru	United Lanka People's Party	12,436	0.10
Aithurus M. Illias	Independent	10,618	0.09
Duminda Nagamuwa	Frontline Socialist Party	9,941	0.08
Siritunga Jayasuriya	United Socialist Party	8,840	0.07
Sarath Manamendra	New Sinhala Heritage	6,875	0.06
Pani Wijesiriwardene	Socialist Equality Party	4,277	0.04
Anurudha Polgampola	Independent	4,260	0.04
Sundaram Mahendran	Nava Sama Samaja Party	4,047	0.03
Muthu Bandara Theminimulla	All Are Citizens, All Are Kings Organisation	3,846	0.03
Battaramulle Seelarathana	Jana Setha Peramuna	3,750	0.03
Prasanna Priyankara	Democratic National Movement	2,793	0.02
Jayantha Kulathunga	United Lanka Great Council	2,061	0.02
Wimal Geeganage	Sri Lanka National Front	1,826	0.02
Total		12,123,452	100.00
Valid votes		12,123,452	98.85
Invalid/blank votes		140,925	1.15
Total votes		12,264,377	100.00
Registered voters/turnout		15,044,490	81.52
Source: Election Commission

Popular vote (%)
Sirisena	51.28%
Rajapaksha	47.58%

Geographical Share (%)
Rajapaksha	56.25%
Sirisena	43.75%

=== By district ===
Districts won by Sirisena
Districts won by Rajapaksa

Electoral District	Province	Rajapaksa		Sirisena		Others		Total Valid		Turnout
Electoral District	Province	Votes	%	Votes	%	Votes	%	Votes	%	Turnout
Anuradhapura	North Central	281,161	53.59%	238,407	45.44%	5,065	0.97%	524,633	100.00%	83.10%
Badulla	Uva	249,243	49.15%	249,524	49.21%	8,303	1.64%	507,070	100.00%	82.99%
Batticaloa	Eastern	41,631	16.22%	209,422	81.62%	5,533	2.16%	256,586	100.00%	70.97%
Colombo	Western	562,614	43.40%	725,073	55.93%	8,673	0.67%	1,296,360	100.00%	82.67%
Digamadulla	Eastern	121,027	33.82%	233,360	65.22%	3,430	0.96%	357,817	100.00%	77.39%
Galle	Southern	377,126	55.64%	293,994	43.37%	6,691	0.99%	677,811	100.00%	83.49%
Gampaha	Western	664,347	49.49%	669,007	49.83%	9,142	0.68%	1,342,496	100.00%	82.88%
Hambantota	Southern	243,295	63.02%	138,708	35.93%	4,073	1.05%	386,076	100.00%	84.13%
Jaffna	Northern	74,454	21.85%	253,574	74.42%	12,723	3.73%	340,751	100.00%	66.28%
Kalutara	Western	395,890	52.65%	349,404	46.46%	6,690	0.89%	751,984	100.00%	84.73%
Kandy	Central	378,585	44.23%	466,994	54.56%	10,329	1.21%	855,908	100.00%	82.63%
Kegalle	Sabaragamuwa	278,130	51.82%	252,533	47.05%	6,108	1.14%	536,771	100.00%	83.60%
Kurunegala	North Western	556,868	53.46%	476,602	45.76%	8,154	0.78%	1,041,624	100.00%	82.98%
Matara	Southern	297,823	57.81%	212,435	41.24%	4,892	0.95%	515,150	100.00%	83.36%
Matale	Central	158,880	51.41%	145,928	47.22%	4,214	1.36%	309,022	100.00%	82.35%
Monaragala	Uva	172,745	61.45%	105,276	37.45%	3,095	1.10%	281,116	100.00%	83.75%
Nuwara Eliya	Central	145,339	34.06%	272,605	63.88%	8,822	2.07%	426,766	100.00%	81.27%
Polonnaruwa	North Central	105,640	41.27%	147,974	57.80%	2,382	0.93%	255,996	100.00%	83.94%
Puttalam	North Western	197,751	48.97%	202,073	50.04%	4,026	1.00%	403,850	100.00%	73.81%
Ratnapura	Sabaragamuwa	379,053	55.74%	292,514	43.01%	8,517	1.25%	680,084	100.00%	84.90%
Trincomalee	Eastern	52,111	26.67%	140,338	71.84%	2,907	1.49%	195,356	100.00%	76.76%
Vanni	Northern	34,377	19.07%	141,417	78.47%	4,431	2.46%	180,225	100.00%	72.57%
Total		5,768,090	47.58%	6,217,162	51.28%	138,200	1.14%	12,123,452	100.00%	81.52%

== Maps ==
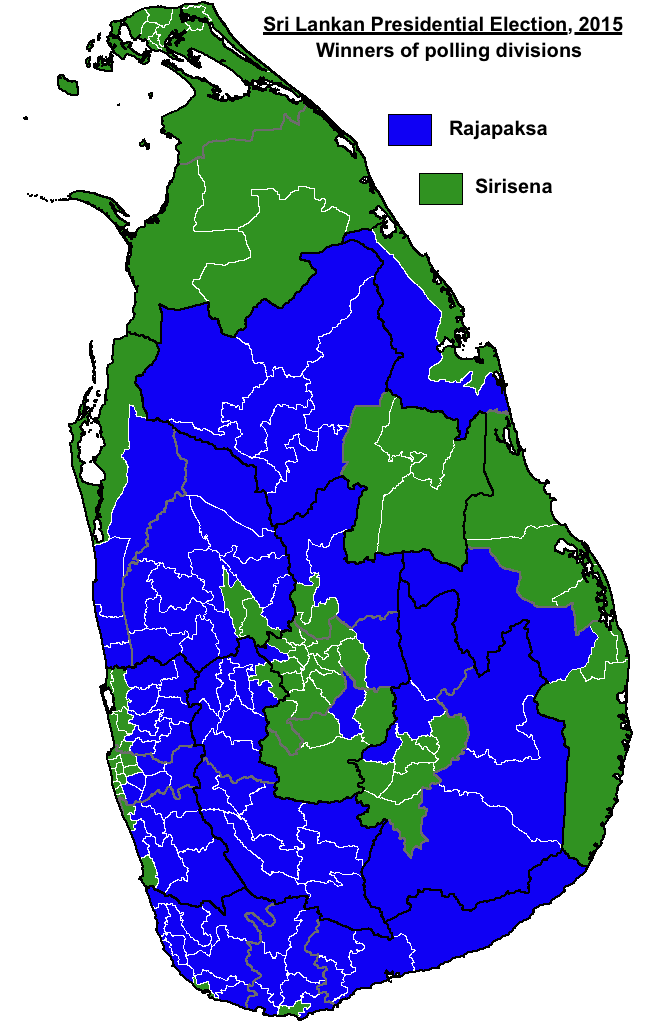
Winners of polling divisions

Majorities according to polling divisions

Majorities according to electoral districts

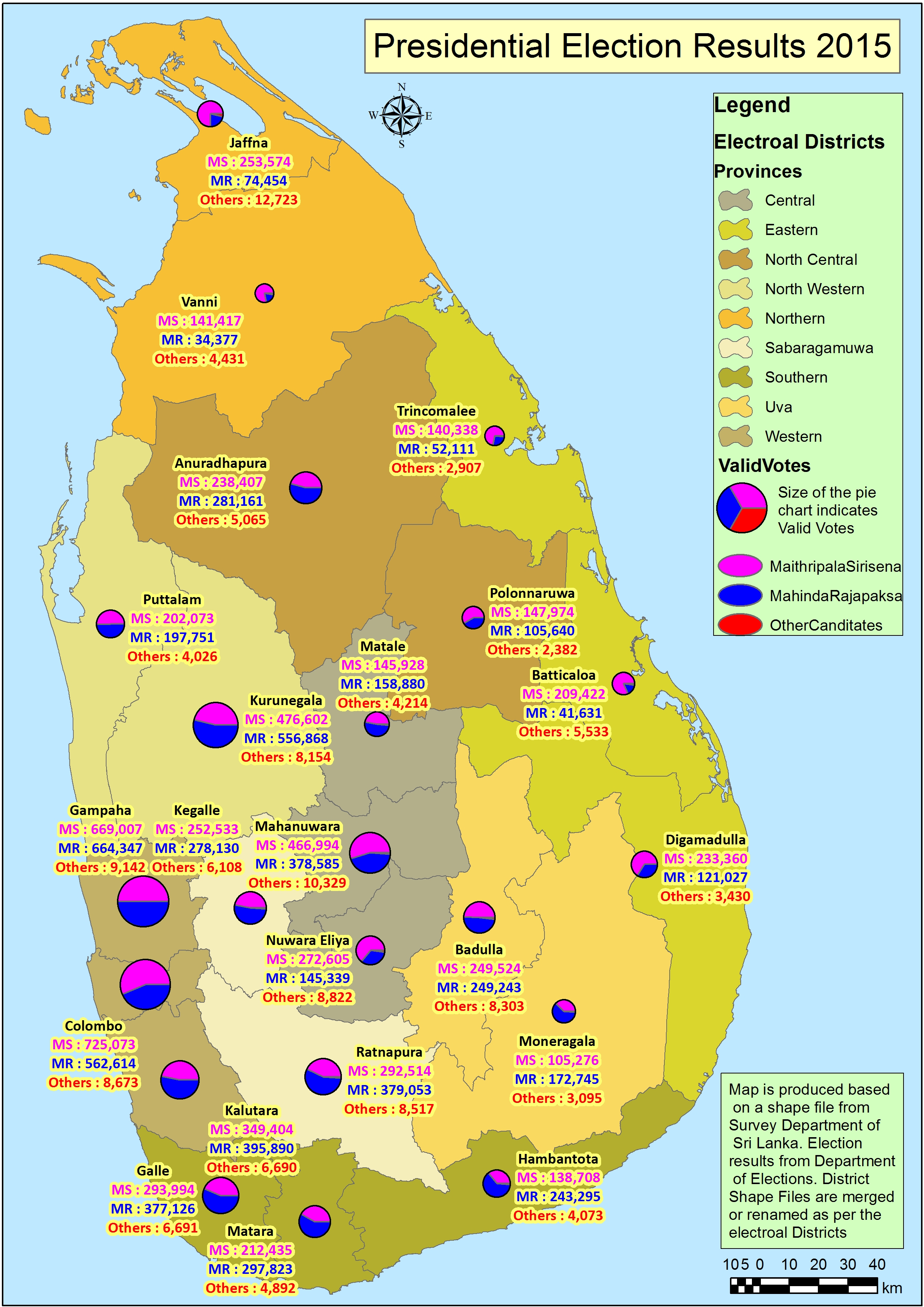
Sri Lanka Presidential Election Results 2015

== Aftermath ==
=== Alleged coup ===
According to Mangala Samaraweera and Rajitha Senaratne, senior figures in the Sirisena campaign, Rajapaksa attempted to stage a coup to stay in power when it became clear he was going to lose the election. They claimed that Rajapaksa and his brother Gotabaya Rajapaksa, then-current Defense Secretary, summoned Commander of the Army Daya Ratnayake, Inspector General of Police N. K. Illangakoon and Attorney General Yuwanjana Wanasundera to the Temple Trees at around 1 am on 9 January 2015. Rajapaksa allegedly pressured the three officials to deploy troops, annul the election results and declare a state of emergency, however, they refused. According to the Colombo Telegraph, Rajapaksa also wished to dissolve parliament. It was only then Rajapaksa decided to concede defeat and summoned Wickremesinghe to assure him of a smooth transition of power.

A spokesman for Rajapaksa dismissed the allegations as baseless. The army and police have also denied the allegations. The Sirisena government subsequently investigated the alleged coup attempt.

=== Departures and resignations ===
Central Bank governor Ajith Nivard Cabraal, who had openly campaigned for Rajapaksa, resigned from his position on 9 January 2015. Minister of Foreign Employment Dilan Perera also resigned. The controversial Treasury Secretary P. B. Jayasundera fled to Singapore on election day. He was replaced by Arjuna Mahendran. B. M. U. D. Basnayake was appointed as Defence Secretary, replacing Rajapaksa's brother Gotabaya Rajapaksa. Lanka Hospitals Corporation, whose biggest shareholder is the state-owned Sri Lanka Insurance Corporation, announced on 9 January 2015 that its chairman (Gotabaya Rajapaksa) and vice chairwoman (Roshini Cabraal, wife of Ajith Nivard Cabraal) had resigned.

Basil Rajapaksa, Minister of Economic Development and another brother of Mahinda Rajapaksa, left Sri Lanka with his wife for the United States on 11 January 2015. Senior diplomats who had returned to Sri Lanka to support the Rajapaksa election campaign left the country on the same day. Two aides of Sarath Fonseka, Major General Mahesh Senanayake and Brigadier Duminda Keppetiwalana, who had fled Sri Lanka after the 2010 presidential election, returned to Sri Lanka on 10 January 2015.

Rajpal Abeynayake and Dinesh Weerawansa, editors of the state-owned Daily News and Sunday Observer newspapers which had run a venomous campaign against Sirisena in the run up to the election, failed to show up for work on 9 January 2015 and had vanished. Following Sirisena's victory, the Daily News made an abrupt u-turn, praising Sirisena and criticising Rajapaksa. Sri Lanka Broadcasting Corporation chairman Hudson Samarasinghe and Deputy General Manager of ITN Sudharman Radaliyagoda fled the country according to the Colombo Telegraph. Somaratne Dissanayake, who had worked for the Rajapaksa regime before defecting to support Sirisena, was appointed chairman of the state-owned Sri Lanka Rupavahini Corporation.

The new administration stated that a special unit would be established to investigate large scale corruption during the Rajapaksa regime.

On 10 January 2015, minister Nimal Siripala de Silva announced that the UPFA would unconditionally support Sirisena's 100-day programme. Addressing the nation from Temple of the Tooth the following day, Sirisena invited all political parties to form a national unity government. Shortly afterwards, a group of 21 SLFP MPs pledged their support for Sirisena.

=== International reaction ===
Supranational bodies

- United Nations – Secretary-General Ban Ki-moon issued a statement on 9 January 2015 congratulating the Sri Lankan people "on the successful conclusion of the presidential election", singling out the election commission for its "professionalism", saying that he looked forward to working with Sirisena while re-iterating his support for development, reconciliation, political dialogue and accountability.
- European Union – Foreign Affairs High Representative Federica Mogherini issued a statement on 9 January 2015 congratulating Sirisena, saying that the "EU looks forward to working with him to further develop its relations with Sri Lanka".

Nations

- Australia – Minister for Foreign Affairs Julie Bishop issued a statement on 10 January 2015 congratulating Sri Lankans on a peaceful and orderly election and pledging to support Sirisena in his attempts to implement democratic reforms, good governance and anti-corruption measures. Later, Prime Minister Tony Abbott telephoned Sirisena to congratulate him, emphasising "continuing cooperation" between the two countries on people smuggling.
- China – At a regular press conference on 9 January 2015, Foreign Ministry spokesman Hong Lei congratulated Sirisena, saying that China expected "new strides made by the Sri Lankan government and people on their course toward national development".
- India – Prime Minister Narendra Modi telephoned Sirisena after Rajapaksa conceded defeat, congratulating Sirisena and the Sri Lankan people for the "peaceful and democratic poll process".
- Japan – Minister for Foreign Affairs Fumio Kishida issued a statement on 9 January 2015 welcoming the "peaceful and successful holding of the presidential election", congratulating Sirisena, saying that Japan hopes that "all parties concerned in Sri Lanka will work together to further promote national reconciliation, democracy and economic development".
- Norway – Prime Minister Erna Solberg issued a statement on 9 January 2015 congratulating the Sri Lankan people and Sirisena, saying that she looked forward to working with the new government to "promote a peaceful, inclusive and democratic Sri Lanka".
- United Kingdom – Prime Minister David Cameron issued a statement on 9 January 2015 congratulating Sirisena and encouraging him to co-operate with UN investigation into alleged war crimes "so that the issues of the past can be addressed and the country can move forward to a brighter, peaceful future where all Sri Lankans can play a role". Foreign Secretary Philip Hammond also issued a statement commending the Sri Lanka people "on the successful completion of their elections" and congratulating Sirisena, saying he looked forward to "working with the new government and reinvigorating the long standing partnership between the UK and Sri Lanka".
- United States – President Barack Obama issued a statement on 9 January 2015 congratulating "the people of Sri Lanka on the successful and peaceful conclusion" to the election and congratulating Sirisena on his victory, saying that it was "a symbol of hope for those who support democracy all around the world". Secretary of State John Kerry also issued a statement praising the Sri Lankan people "on the successful conclusion of their elections", commending Rajapaksa for conceding defeat and saying that he looked "forward to working with President-elect Maithripala Sirisena".

=== Presidential inauguration ===
The results of the elections were officially declared on 9 January 2015. Later that day, Sirisena was inaugurated as the seventh president of Sri Lanka at a ceremony held at Independence Square in Colombo. His oath of office was administered by the Supreme Court Justice K. Sripavan. Soon afterwards he appointed Ranil Wickremesinghe, leader of the United National Party, as Prime Minister.
