= The Ceylon Observer =

Former Sri Lankan newspaper

- Fiat justitia

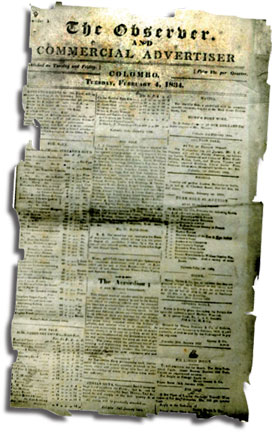
- Front page of The Observer and Commercial Advertiser first issue, 4 February 1834
- Type: Daily newspaper
- Owner: Associated Newspapers of Ceylon Limited
- Founded: 4 February 1834
- Ceased publication: February 1982
- Language: English
- City: Colombo
- Country: Sri Lanka
- Sister newspapers: Ceylon Daily News; Dinamina; Silumina; Sunday Observer; Thinakaran; Thinakaran Varamanjari
- OCLC number: 1781404

The Ceylon Observer was an English-language daily newspaper in Sri Lanka published by Associated Newspapers of Ceylon Limited (ANCL). It was founded in 1834 as The Observer and Commercial Advertiser and was published from Colombo. It ceased publication in 1982.

== History ==
The Observer and Commercial Advertiser was started on 4 February 1834 by Colombo-based British merchants. It was under the control of E. J. Darley who was also its first editor. The merchants then appointed George Winter editor. The paper was published on Mondays and Thursdays but later became an afternoon daily. In its first year, the paper's editor and publishers were tried for libel after the paper printed a letter criticising the superintendent of police but were acquitted.

Christopher Elliott, colonial surgeon for Badulla, became editor of the paper in 1835 and later its owner. Elliott changed the name of the paper to The Colombo Observer. The paper was critical of Governor Wilmot-Horton's administration which resulted in a pro-government paper, The Ceylon Chronicle, being established by a group of civil servants in 1837. The Colombo Observer supported Governor Stewart-Mackenzie's administration but opposed the Campbell and Torrington administrations. A monthly (later fortnightly, then weekly) sister newspaper, The Overland Observer, commenced in 1840.

Alastair Mackenzie Ferguson joined the staff of The Colombo Observer in 1846 and bought the paper in 1859 after Elliott became the Principal Officer of the newly created Civil Medical Department. Ferguson's nephew John Ferguson joined the paper in 1861. The paper changed its name to The Ceylon Observer in 1867. John Ferguson became joint-editor in 1870 and a partner in 1875. Following A. M. Ferguson's death in 1892 John Ferguson became editor of the paper. John Ferguson was succeeded as editor by his son Ronald Haddon Ferguson.

The paper was bought by a company owned by the European Association of Ceylon in 1920. D. R. Wijewardena bought the paper in 1923, adding it to his growing media empire (later known as Associated Newspapers of Ceylon Limited). A Sunday edition of the paper, the Sunday Observer, commenced on 4 February 1928.

In the early twentieth century, The Ceylon Observer and its sister newspaper Ceylon Daily News actively campaigned for constitutional change in Ceylon. ANCL and its rival Times of Ceylon Limited (TOCL) dominated the newspaper industry when Ceylon obtained independence from Britain in 1948. The ANCL newspapers were seen as pro-United National Party. In July 1973 the Sri Lanka Freedom Party (SLFP) led United Front government nationalised ANCL. The legislation which nationalised the ANCL, the Associated Newspapers of Ceylon Limited (Special Provisions) Law No. 28 of 1973, required broad basing of its publications but successive governments have failed to carry this out and ANCL is still the largest newspaper company in Sri Lanka. Its various publications are slavishly pro-government irrespective of which party is in power.

The Ceylon Observer ceased publishing in February 1982. The Sunday Observer, which is still in circulation, is sometimes referred to being the same newspaper as The Ceylon Observer.
