= Denzil Peiris =

Sri Lankan editor and journalist

- ඩෙන්සිල් පීරිස්
- Born: 15 March 1917; Gampaha, Sri Lanka
- Died: 6 March 1985 (aged 67); London
- Education: Nalanda College, Colombo
- Occupation: Journalist
- Spouse: Roshan
- Children: Ranjit (son), Suren (son)

Denzil Peiris (15 March 1917 – 6 March 1985) was the editor of The Ceylon Observer, published by Associated Newspapers of Ceylon Limited.

Peiris was born on 15 March 1917, at Gampaha the eldest of a family of eight. He received his education at Nalanda College Colombo. His father died whilst he was still at school so he took a job with Lake House (now known as Associated Newspapers of Ceylon Limited) to support his family. He rose through the ranks becoming the editor of Silumina in the 1950s, Janatha (a Sinhalese daily tabloid), Jana (an international news magazine) and eventually The Ceylon Observer in 1961, a position he retained for nine years.

Peiris left Sri Lanka in the early 1970s to work as the Indian correspondent for a Hong Kong–based newspaper, The Asian. He then joined the Far Eastern Economic Review working as its regional editor before moving in 1979 to the United Kingdom to become the founder editor of South, a monthly magazine which focused events happening primarily in the underdeveloped Southern regions of the globe - Asia, Africa and Southern America.

Peiris died in London on 6 March 1985, was cremated there, with some of his ashes buried at Highgate Cemetery and the remainder interred in Colombo.
