= 2015 alleged Sri Lankan coup attempt =

2015 alleged Sri Lankan coup d'état attempt
- Part of 2015 Sri Lankan presidential election
| Date | 9 January 2015 |
| Location | Sri Lanka |
| Result | Coup aborted |

Belligerents
| Rajapaksa Loyalists | Government of Sri Lanka |

Commanders and leaders
| Mahinda Rajapaksa | Maithripala Sirisena |

Casualties and losses
| None | |

In 2015 a coup d'état was allegedly attempted in Sri Lanka by former president Mahinda Rajapaksa in order to remain in power after he had been voted out in the 2015 Sri Lankan presidential election. Rajapaksa, who was expected to easily win a third term in office lost to Maithripala Sirisena, a former ally and member of the Rajapaksa administration. Though ultimately there was a peaceful transition between governments, some government officials claim Rajapaksa made an attempt to deploy the army and police to stop the counting of votes when initial results showed he was heading for defeat.

== Background ==
The presidency of Mahinda Rajapaksa, from 2005 to 2015 was an increasingly authoritarian regime characterised by the diminishing human rights in the country, nepotism, weakening of government institutions, slow progress of national reconciliation in the aftermath of the Sri Lankan Civil War, and controversial ties to China. In September 2010 Parliament, which was controlled by Rajapaksa's UPFA, passed the eighteenth amendment to the constitution, removing the two term limit on presidents, allowing Rajapaksa to run for a third term.

There was speculation in mid-2014 that Rajapaksa would call another early presidential election: on 20 October 2014 Minister of Mass Media and Information Keheliya Rambukwella confirmed that the election would be held in January 2015. On 20 November 2014 Rajapaksa issued a proclamation calling for a presidential election at which he would seek re-election. The following day election commissioner Mahinda Deshapriya announced that nominations would be taken on 8 December 2014 and that the election would be held on 8 January 2015.

In response to the degrading democracy in the country, the United National Party (UNP), along with several other parties and civil organisations, signed a Memorandum of Understanding and decided to field the then Secretary General of Sri Lanka Freedom Party (SLFP), Maithripala Sirisena, as the Common Candidate for the 2015 Presidential Election. Sirisena, a former health minister under Rajapaksa, pledged to appoint UNP Leader Ranil Wickremesinghe as the Prime Minister if he were to win the election. Sirisena was declared the winner after receiving 51.28% of all votes cast compared to Rajapaksa's 47.58%. The result was generally seen as an upset. When Rajapaksa called the election in November 2014 he had looked certain to win.

== Plot ==
Athuraliye Rathana Thero and senior figures in the Sirisena campaign, MPs Rajitha Senaratne and Mangala Samaraweera, allege Mahinda Rajapaksa attempted to stage a coup in order to stay in power when it became clear he was going to lose the election. According to Athuraliye Rathana Thero, Rajapaksa attempted a coup d'état hours after the announcement of the election results. They allege that Rajapaksa and his brother Gotabaya Rajapaksa, the Defence Secretary, summoned Commander of the Army Daya Ratnayake, Inspector General of Police Nugagaha Kapalle Illangakoon and Attorney General Yuwanjana Wijayatilake to Temple Trees at around 1 am on 9 January 2015. Rajapaksa allegedly pressured the three officials to deploy troops, annul the election results and declare a state of emergency but they refused. According to the Colombo Telegraph Rajapaksa also wanted to dissolve parliament. Unable to convince them, it was only then Rajapaksa decided to concede defeat and summoned Ranil Wickremesinghe, who was slated to be Prime Minister, to assure him of a smooth transition of power.

== Aftermath ==
The Sirisena government launched a probe into the alleged coup by Rajapaksa. The government argued that Rajapaksa attempted to seize the poll-counting centers when Rajapaksa realised that he was losing the election. One of the witnesses, the Attorney General, admitted to Criminal Investigation Department the coup attempt made by Rajapaksa. The Attorney General refused to act on behalf of Rajapaksa and many believe the story of an attempt is accurate after Attorney General orders an investigation into this coup. Former army chief Sarath Fonseka also claims that the Rajapaksa had moved nearly 2,000 troops into Colombo from Northern Province three days before the election results were announced. Fonseka claimed that the troops were ready take action on coup.

However the cabinet spokesperson of the new government stated, during a press conference held on 24 March 2015, that there was no evidence to prove that such a coup was attempted during the night of the election. A spokesman for Rajapaksa has denied the allegations as baseless. The army and police have also denied the allegations.

== See also ==
- 1966 alleged Ceylonese coup d'état attempt
- 2018 Sri Lankan constitutional crisis, an attempted coup by President Maithripala Sirisena and Mahinda Rajapaksa
