= Srimath Indrajith Liyanage =

- Born: Colombo
- Education: Nalanda College Colombo,
- Known for: Television, Theater, Cinema, Journalism, Dubbing, Announcing, Singer

Srimath Indrajith Liyanage is a popular television, music and literary personality in Sri Lanka.

== Early life and education ==
Srimath is the son of leading journalist Gunadasa Liyanage and was educated at Nalanda College Colombo.

== Later life and career ==
After leaving school, Srimath started his career as a novice announcer at Sri Lanka Broadcasting Corporation and has been trained by many qualified media personnel such as H. M. Gunasekera, Cyril Rajapakse, Lalith S. Maithreepala and Palitha Perera. His son is Sandiv Liyanage.

Radio

Later he went on handling many programmes such as Wasantha Sandella, Saraswathie Mandapaya etc. with Sri Lanka Broadcasting Corporation.

Television

Srimath has been a Television presenter for many programmes such as Ayubowan, Subha Udesanak, Eheta Kanata and Gee Hatha on Sri Lanka Rupavahini Corporation and Kalarasanga, Komala Reka, and Suraksha Sandella on ITN, Sawanata Geemadu on TNL TV, Alakamandawa on MTV Channel.

Film acting & Teledramas

Liyanage has acted in many movies such as Rajya Sevaya Pinisai, Kiri Kadulu, Sonduru Dadabima, Ma Go Di Go Di, Paya Enna Hiru Se, Hadawatha Mal Yayai, Piyambanna Asai, Asal Wesiyo, Panchayudha and Senehebara Dolly. Few of his teledrama castings were with Hima Keta Malaya and Rakawaranaya.

Dubbing

He is also a dubbing artiste for in Praveena, (Rishab Balaji) Harry Potter, The Lord of the Ring, Spirit and Bay Watch programmes.

Book & Lyrics

Few of Srimath's publications are Muhunata Muhuna, Peeli Panina Naharawel, a collection of lyrics and poems such as Tsunami Sapaya, Patikiriya, Panhindaka Sanhinda and a story book for children named Raththaran Amma.

Katahanda Media Foundation

Srimath is also the Founder and owner of Katahanda Media Foundation that trains media personalities.
