= Dharisha Bastians =

Sri Lankan journalist and human rights activist

- ධරීෂා බැස්ටියන්ස්
- Occupation: Journalist

Dharisha Bastians also spelt as either Darisha Bastians or Darisha Bastian is a Sri Lankan journalist and human rights activist. She was the Editor of the Sunday Observer and a contributor to The New York Times.

== Career ==
Dharisha has written several articles extensively based on human rights, militarization, democracy and political rights in Sri Lanka. Her article Navy Abduction Case received wide international attention which covered about alleged abduction of 11 Tamil young men in extortion in 2008. She also reported regarding the assassination of prominent The Sunday Leader journalist Lasantha Wickrematunge in 2009. In July 2018, she and her family received threats from Pro-Rajapaksa supporters regarding legal action against them for contributing to an article to The New York Times which exposed about the Chinese investment in Hambantota harbour including of Chinese funds which flowed during Mahinda Rajapaksa's presidential campaign prior to the 2015 Sri Lanka presidential election. She also reportedly left Sri Lanka following the 2019 Sri Lanka presidential election.

In June 2020, her residence was raided and her laptop was seized by the Criminal Investigation Department in connection with the alleged abduction of a female staff worker of the Swiss Embassy in Colombo who was reportedly kidnapped by unidentified men. Bastians was accused of having close connection with the Swiss staff employee. The international human rights organisations condemned the actions of the Government of Sri Lanka and urged to end the continuous prosecution and harassment of Bastians.
