= Jayatilleke De Silva =

Sri Lankan author, translator, journalist, and JVP activist (1938–2019)

Jayatilleke de Silva
- ජයතිලක ද සිල්වා
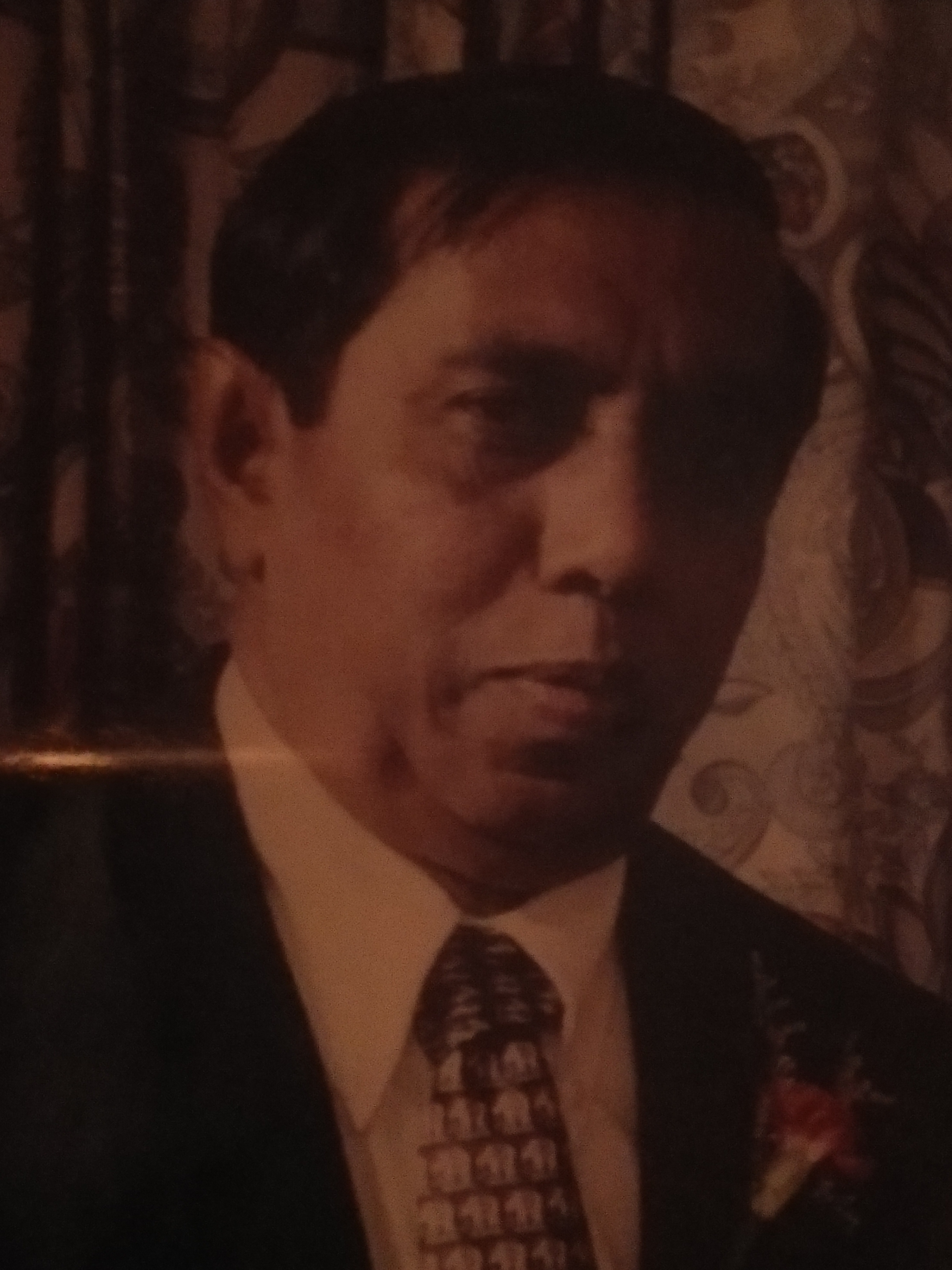
- Born: 14 June 1938; Nindana Village, Batapola, Ambalangoda, Sri Lanka
- Died: 26 February 2019 (aged 80); Asiri Surgical Hospital, Colombo
- Resting place: Nawala Koswatta Cemetery
- Education: University of Ceylon
- Occupations: Journalist; author; politician
- Spouse: Sunila née Dias
- Children: 3

Jayatilleke de Silva (Sinhala:ජයතිලක ද සිල්වා) (14 June 1938 – 26 February 2019) was a Sri Lankan author, translator, journalist and a political activist.

== Early life and education ==
De Silva was born in Ambalangoda-Batapola, Nindana Village in 1938 and commenced his preliminary studies at Hikkaduwa Central College. Then he continued his further studies in Mathematics from the University of Ceylon, Colombo. He chose his initial profession to be teaching. After a short period as the Principal of Deniyaya Central College, he left the teaching to pursue a full-time career in politics.

== Political career ==
He started his political career from the Sri Lanka Communist Party, of which he was an active member for a few decades. He got remanded for many years trying to topple the government under terrorism act during 1980s. In mid 1980s he and majority of its members left the Communist Party and Socialist People's Movement (සමාජවාදි ජනතා ව්‍යාපාරය Samajawadi Janatha Wyapraya) was formed. During the later stages he devoted his time to helping and was actively engaged forming the yahapalana government with Janatha Vimukthi Peramuna. Soon after De Silva's death, his wife, Sunila Nandani Dias donated de Silva’s library to JVP.

De Silva was an active committee member of the Sri Lanka Committee for Solidarity with Palestine, and the Journalists for Global Justice organization.

== Journalism career ==
His first foray into journalism was from the Aththa newspaper of the Communist Party. As editor of Mawbima and Forward newspapers, he dedicated most of his time to the party's ideological and youth activities. He later joined the Daily News newspaper in the late 1990s and continued his journalism in English medium. De Silva's bilingual writing ability paved the way for him to become the Editor in Chief of the Daily News in year 2001. Later he was appointed the Chief Editor of the Sunday Observer in 2003. However his articles during his later tenure in support of Liberation Tigers of Tamil Eelam suspects stating that "LTTE suspects are political prisoners" was a major controversial statement in his career as majority of the Sinhalese community started demeaning his allegation. He was dismissed from the editorial post of Lake House.

== Author ==
De Silva translated the three volume Karl Marx's treatise on the socialist model, Das Kapital to Sinhala while actively engaging in political activities. He contributed to the panel of judges to select the best translations of the year at several literary festivals organized by the State Literary Advisory board during yahapalana government.

=== Bibliography ===
- de Silva, Jayatilleke (2009). Pragdhanaya : dhanapathi nishpadanaya pilibanda vivechanathmaka vishleshanayak - Vol. 1- Book 1 & 2 Karl Marx. Sri Lanka: 21st Century Publishers. ISBN 9789550224005.
- de Silva, Jayatilleke (2009). Pragdhanaya : dhanapathi nishpadanaya pilibanda vivechanathmaka vishleshanayak - Vol. 1- Book - 2 Karl Marx. Sri Lanka: 21st Century Publishers. ISBN 9789550224012.
- de Silva, Jayatilleke (2018). Karl Marx;Friedrich Engels(ed.)Pragdanaya Volume 3. Sri Lanka: 21st Century Publishers. ISBN 9789550224098.
- de Silva, Jayatilleke (2008). Gini Thatu. Sri Lanka: Kathru Prakashana. ISBN 9789551317003.
- de Silva, Jayatilleke (2011). Ganta Nade Ka Wenuwen Do. Sri Lanka: Dayawansa Jayakody & Co. ISBN 9789555517324.
- de Silva, Jayatilleke (2006). Senpathi Fidel. Sri Lanka: National Collaboration Committee for Sri Lanka & Cuba. ISBN 9551521021.
- de Silva, Jayatilleke (1996). Ethin Wessa Kada Haluna. Sri Lanka: S. Godage. ISBN 9552018838.
- de Silva, Jayatilleke (1996). Vajrayudha : Mark Twain ge upahasa rachana Mark Twain. Sri Lanka: Arunalu Prints. ISBN 9559523325.
- de Silva, Jayatilleke (2011). Samajawadaya Saha Minisa Saha Wenath Rachana. Sri Lanka: 21st Century Publishers. ISBN 9789550224043.
- de Silva, Jayatilleke (2017). Aththikarama. Sri Lanka: Kurulu Poth Prakashakayo. ISBN 9789555913348.
- de Silva, Jayatilleke (2015). Samajawadaya minis waga mathu dawasa. Sri Lanka: 21st Century Publishers. ISBN 9789550224081.
- de Silva, Jayatilleke (2000). Emerson tennent asu dutu lankawa: Jeeweehu. Sri Lanka: National Library and Documentation Services Board. ISBN 9558383007.
- de Silva, Jayatilleke (2003). Ithihasaya Ma Nidos Karawi. Sri Lanka: Sri Lanka Cuba Mithrathwa Sangamaya. ISBN 9558918008.
- de Silva, Jayatilleke (2012). Globalization And Its Challenges. Sri Lanka: 21st Century Publishers. ISBN 9789550224050.
