= Chathura Senaratne =

Sri Lankan politician (born 1982)

Hon. Chathura Senaratne
- චතුර සේනාරත්න

Member of Parliament for Gampaha District
- In office 1 September 2015 – 3 March 2020

Personal details
- Born: 20 February 1982 (age 44) Sri Lanka
- Party: Samagi Jana Balawegaya
- Other political affiliations: United National Front for Good Governance
- Spouse: Sarupa Samangi
- Relations: Rajitha Senaratne (father)
- Education: Ananda College, Colombo Harvard Business School
- Occupation: Politician

Nambukara Helambage Chathura Sandeepa Senaratne (born 20 February 1982) (Sinhala: චතුර සේනාරත්න) is a Sri Lankan politician and a former member of the Parliament of Sri Lanka.

== Early life and education ==
Nambukara Helambage Chathura Sandeepa Senaratne was born 20 November 1982 the son of Rajitha (a dentist and politician) and Sujatha (a dentist), he received his education at Ananda College, Colombo and was admitted to the University of Colombo to study for a MBBS degree in medicine in 2004 but dropped out.

== Political career ==
=== Early career ===
Working with his father in his political activities in the Kalutura electorate, Senaratne served as president of the Kalutara District Development Foundation, chief organiser of the Rajitha Senaratne Foundation and traveled widely in Europe, Asia accompanying his father on official travels and attending study tours in the United States. He worked for the United National Party and between 2007 and 2014 for the United People's Freedom Alliance following his father's defection to the SLFP dominated UPFA government in January 2007.

=== Presidential election 2015 ===
He campaigned along with his father for the common opposition candidate Maithripala Sirisena at the 2015 presidential election.

=== Parliamentary election 2015 ===
He contested in the 2015 parliamentary election as the United National Front for Good Governance (UNFGG) candidate in the Gampaha electorate and was elected to Parliament.

=== Parliamentary Election 2020 ===
He contested the general elections in 2020 as the Samagi Jana Balawegaya candidate in the Gampaha electorate, but was unsuccessful in getting elected.

== See also ==
- List of political families in Sri Lanka
