= Premasara Epasinghe =

Sri Lankan journalist and cricket commentator

Premasara Epasinghe ප්‍රේමසරා ඈපාසිංහ
- Born: 5 October 1937 (age 88); Colombo, Sri Lanka
- Education: Nalanda College Colombo
- Alma mater: University of Sri Jayewardenepura
- Occupations: teacher, broadcaster
- Known for: Cricket Commentries
- Spouse: Swarna Samararatne (m. 1968)
- Children: 2
- Parents: Don Ranoris Epasinghe (father); Habaragamu Ralalage Podinona Peiris (mother)
- Awards: Kalasuri

Kala Suri Premasara Epasinghe (born 5 October 1937) (Sinhala: ප්‍රේමසරා ඈපාසිංහ), is a Sri Lankan cricket commentator and journalist. Considered as an iconic radio personality in Sri Lankan radio, Premasara became a household name in Sri Lankan cricket commentary history.

== Early life and education ==
He was born on 5 October 1937 at the College House of the University of Colombo, Sri Lanka. His father Don Ranoris Epasinghe from Galtota, Panadura was an administrative officer at the University of Colombo. His mother Podinona Peiris from Mavitte, Galle, was a teacher. He first attended Visakha Vidyalaya, Colombo, was a mixed school at the time. In 1950, when Premasara was 13 years old, his mother died. He had four older brothers, all of whom died within a year of their birth.

He then attended Nalanda College, Colombo, where he studied in the English medium. In 1956, during the inter-house sports meet, he began playing cricket for his house team, 'Chandra'. Although he had never played hardball cricket before, he made a significant impact in the match by scoring 78 runs, contributing to his house team 'Chandra’s' total of 148 runs. Ultimately, 'Chandra' went on to win the match. Following that innings, he was invited to join the college team under the guidance of Nalanda College cricket coach, Kandasamy. He was the only Nalandian cricketer to join the senior team directly, without having to compete in the junior teams.

His first opportunity to compete after joining the senior team came in 1957, in a match against St. Anthony's College, Kandy. In that match, he opened the batting alongside Sarath Silva and also played as the wicketkeeper. In the same year, he played nine matches in the first three months, leading up to the Ananda-Nalanda Big Match. During this time, in five matches, Sarath Silva and Epasinghe formed a partnership of over 100 runs for the first wicket. Premasara represented Nalanda in the 28th Ananda-Nalanda Big Match, which was held at the P. Sara Oval. However, he scored only two runs in the first innings, nine runs in the second innings, and took two catches as the wicketkeeper. With this match, he concluded his school cricket career, which lasted just three months.

In November 1968, Premasara married Swarna Samararatne, who was a teacher at Stafford Girls' College, Colombo. The couple had a son, Bhagya, and a daughter, Apsara. Bhagya attended Nalanda College, Colombo, and after passing his Ordinary Level exams, he transferred to S. Thomas' College, Mount Lavinia.'. He became a Thomian opening batsman in the 1989 cricket season and later attended the University of Colombo in the 1990s. He is currently the Director of Finance at a private firm in Canberra, Australia. His daughter, Apsara Gunasekera, is a squash player who has represented Sri Lanka."

== Career ==
He passed the college senior examination on 30 March 1958 with highest distinctions. Meanwhile, he went to the temple to meet the Chief Incumbent of the Valukarama Temple in Kollupitiya, Ven. Mavittara Sri Revatha Nayaka Thero, who was actually Premasara's father's older brother. Thero asked Premasara to teach English in the Mahanama college starting at the temple on 5 May 1958. He was the one who suggested the quote from the “Vidwan Sarvatdhara Pujate” (Age is always looking around) which is still used in Mahanama College.

Meanwhile, in 1959, he applied for a journalist vacancy in the Lake House and later selected as a sports reporter under D. C. Ranatunga. However he was able to balance both the teaching profession and the media profession at the same time. In 1962, he applied Lanka Radio as a relief announcer. Even though he received the job in Lanka Radio, he was also selected to the Vidyodaya University (currently known as University of Sri Jayewardenepura). In 1963, he entered the Faculty of Arts of the Vidyodaya University and chose Sinhala, English, Educational Science and History. Educational science was a new subject in the university stream at that time and only taught in English medium. Professor Clarence P. Noise of the University of Wisconsin, USA, came to Sri Lanka for two years and taught that subject with two local lecturers: Professors KHM Sumathipala and P Aranpaththa.

During this period, he was also appointed for reporting on the senate and parliamentary sessions of the day under the supervision of D. C. Ranatunga and U. L. Chandrathilaka. At the same time, he took the initiation to establish a cricket club at Vidyodaya University. In 1966, the annual cricket match between Vidyalankara and Vidyodaya Universities has started. During the graduation year in 1967 with Bachelor of Arts degree, he was appointed as the teacher in Sigiriya Maha Vidyalaya. On 14 October of that year, Epasinghe was the first to report about damages caused to the Sigiriya murals through Lake House publications.

Premasara was later appointed to Nalanda College in January 1968 as a teacher. Accordingly, he was given the responsibility of teaching Sinhala at the Advanced Level and working as the teacher in charge of cricket. After the birth of his son Bhagya, Epasinghe retired from the teaching and joined the Bank of Ceylon (BOC). At the same time, he introduced the radio program "Aradhana" to the Sri Lanka Broadcasting Corporation during his tenure as the BOC's first Public Relations Officer. During this time, Epasinghe also played for the Mercantile Cricket Club as the opening batsman as well as the wicketkeeper. He also played club cricket for the University, Bank of Ceylon, Saracens and Nationalized Services. He made a memorable knock of 136 which he made for the Bank of Ceylon against Ceylon Insurance.

During the early 1970s, he was invited by Gunaratne Abeysekara who worked as a radio program producer, to be a radio cricket commentator. Accordingly, with the support of Nanda Jayamanne, in charge of the evening service of the Sri Lanka Broadcasting Corporation, Premasara joined SLBC. In a career spanned for more than four decades, he worked as a cricket commentator in various domestic and international cricket tournaments. His first commentary as a cricket commentator was in 1971 Royal–Thomian where he did commentary together with Palitha Perera. Premasara was also the cricket commentator at Sri Lanka's ever first test match, 100th and 150th. As he said, his most notable and unforgettable match commentary came through the 1996 Cricket World Cup final between Sri Lanka and Australia played at the Gadhafi Stadium in Pakistan.

He has worked as the press secretary or the media consultant to many Ministers and was the former private secretary and media consultant to the Minister of Education.

In 2018, he received an award of excellence at the Sri Jayewardenepura Awards ceremony. On 11 December 2020, he was honored with the Gold Lifetime Achievement award at the inaugural 'Sabuddhi Sports Literary Awards'.

== Autobiography ==
On the 6 December 2023 "Golden Voice of Cricket in Sri Lanka: Premasara Epasinghe" biography was launched at Nalanda College Malalasekara Hall organised by Past Cricket Association of Nalanda College together with the Nalanda Media Circle. Senior Journalist Athula Ranjith Wedamisthrige compiled Epasinghe’s biography.
