= Weerawansa =

Weerawansa is a surname. Notable people with the surname include:

- Dinesh Weerawansa (born 1966), Sri Lankan journalist
- Wimal Weerawansa (born 1965), Sri Lankan politician
