= L. H. Mettananda =

Sri Lankan activist

Lokusathu Hewa Mettananda (19 March 1894 – 1 November 1967) was a Sri Lankan educationist and activist. L. H. Mettananda served as the principal of Nalanda College, Colombo (1925 to 1926) Dharmaraja College (1936–1945) and Ananda College (1945–1954). He was a member of the Buddhist Committee of Inquiry, which was established by the All Ceylon Buddhist Congress in 1954, and was the leader of the Bauddha Jathika Balawegaya (Buddhist National Force) and the Dharma Samaja Party.

Mettananda was born in Kaluwadumulla, Ambalangoda, to L. H. Kovies De Silva and Weerasooriya Karalinahamy. He was the eldest in the family of five brothers and one sister. He was educated at Dharmasoka College, Ambalangoda and Richmond College, Galle, completing his London Matriculation examination in 1913. Thereafter he trained as a teacher at the Teacher's Training College, Colombo from 1914 to 1915. Later he gained a Diploma in Education from the London Day Training College in 1930. He taught at Sri Sumangala Boys' School, Panadura; Holy Cross College, Kalutara and joined the teaching staff of Ananda College in 1919. He was selected as the first principal at Nalanda Vidyalaya in 1923 by the Buddhist Theosophical Society.
