= Nalanda College, Colombo =

Buddhist boys school in Sri Lanka

Coordinates: 6°55′20″N 79°52′29″E

- නාලන්දා විද්‍යාලය, කොළඹ நாளந்தா கல்லூரி, கொழும்பு
- Siri Dhamma Mawatha; Colombo, 01000; Sri Lanka

Information
- Type: Public school
- Motto: Pali: අපදාන සෝභිනී පඤ්ඤා Āpadāna Sobhinī Panñā (Character Illumines Wisdom)
- Religious affiliation: Buddhist
- Established: 1 November 1925; 101 years ago
- Category: National school
- Principal: Iran Champika
- Grades: 1–13
- Gender: Boys
- Age: 6 to 19
- Enrollment: 4000+
- Education system: National Education System
- Hours in school day: 07:30–13:30
- Houses: Soorya; Chandra; Maurya; Nanda
- Colours: Maroon and silver
- Song: bænda dhajā siri lakdiva mandira
- Athletics: Yes
- Sports: Yes
- Affiliation: Ministry for Education
- Alumni: Old Nalandians
- Website: nalandacollege.lk
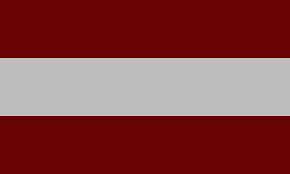
- Flag of Nalanda College, Colombo

Nalanda College (Sinhala: නාලන්දා විද්‍යාලය) is a Buddhist school in Sri Lanka that provides primary and secondary education for boys. The school was founded by Buddhist educator Patrick de Silva Kularatne as an offshoot of Ananda College, Colombo, and was officially registered as a separate institution on 1 November 1925.

== History ==
In 1922, a section of Ananda College was relocated to Campbell Place, Colombo, following a proposal from Kularatne. L. H. Mettananda was appointed principal of the institution, which became known as the Ananda branch. W. E. Fernando served as headmaster, and Ven. Balangoda Ananda Maitreya Thero became its first Buddhist teacher.

In 1922, the Governor of Ceylon laid the school's foundation stone. In 1924, Kularatne spent Rs. 5,500 to purchase 0.10 ha (0.25 acres) of land near the Campbell Place playground and built sixteen classrooms for the new school, including three for laboratory use and two containing the principal and staff offices. A total of 330 students from Ananda were transferred under the care of Mettananda in 1924.

Kularatne helped register the institution as a separate school on 1 November 1925. The new school was given its motto, Apadana Sobhini Panna, while the school name Nalanda was proposed by Ananda Maitreya Thero. The English and Sinhala versions are "Character illumines Wisdom" and "Yahapath Charithayen Praggnawa Opanangwe", respectively. Ananda Maitreya Thero selected this motto from the Anguttara Nikaya, Tika Nipata, Bala Waggo Lakkhana Sutta.

On 1 January 1926, Kularatne appointed Dr. Gunapala Piyasena Malalasekera as the first registered principal of the newly formed Nalanda College, and transferred Mettananda back to Ananda College as vice principal. Malalasekara launched several projects, making plans for the collection of funds for the construction of buildings, and later commenced a bulletin titled Nalanda. He also arranged 15-minute talks on Buddhism at the daily students' assembly and took many steps to promote the Buddhist environment in the school.

Kularatne laid the foundation stone for a second building on 30 March 1926. By the end of 1926, the number of students had increased to 550. Later, he borrowed money from Anagarika Dharmapala to purchase land for the primary section, which was then settled by Malalasekara. The student assembly hall, Malalasekara Theater, is named after him.

== Academics ==
Students of Nalanda College have participated in national-level examinations, with some achieving high grades in O-Level and A-Level exams, as well as in various sports competitions.

== Awards ==
In 2011, Nalanda students won first place in the world at the Oracle Thinkquest Application Development. They also won first place in the International Students Biotechnology Competition and the 14th place in the International Convention on Students' Quality Control Circles, held in Lucknow, India. Students of Nalanda College, Colombo, have also participated in research activities. In 2017, a student of the Research Forum won a silver medal for his research work, "Deposition of air pollutants on pollen grains and occurrence of respiratory allergies among humans," at the International Conference of Young Scientists in Germany.

== Nalanda College Communication Unit ==
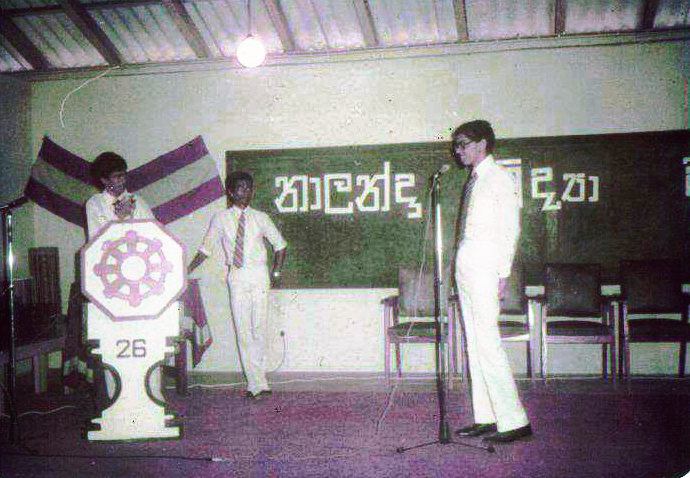
Nalanda College Announcers

Nalanda College Communication Unit (Sinhala: නාලන්දා විද්‍යාලයීය ජනසන්නිවේදන ඒකකය), also known as The Communication Unit of Nalanda College or NCCU Studios, is the official school communication society of Nalanda College. Established in 1986, Nalanda College Communication Unit has been working as a school communication society in Sri Lanka up to the present.

Nalanda College began its media work on 24 May 1926, by launching a school newspaper Nalanda Pravurthi (Sinhala: නාලන්දා ප්‍රවෘත්ති, lit: Nalanda News) in accordance to the Nalanda Kusum Dina Campaign by professor Gunapala Malalasekara, principal at that time. In 1927, a school magazine Nalanda Sangarawa (Sinhala: නාලන්දා සඟරාව, lit: Nalanda Magazine) was launched.

Nalanda College's communication network was founded in 1986 under the name Nalanda College Communication Unit, carrying the motto Muhukura Nagena Janasanniwedanaye Abhimanaya (Sinhala: මුහුකුරා නැගෙන ජනසන්නිවේදනයේ අභිමානය, lit: The Pride of Emerging Mass Communication). A pioneer in school-level media, the unit grew from its origins into a structured institution open to students from Grade 6 through Advanced Levels.

Today, the unit upholds that legacy by producing some of Sri Lanka's most recognized school television and radio broadcasts, organizing All-Island Media Day Competitions, and extending its reach across digital platforms including Facebook, Instagram, YouTube, Spotify, and Apple Music.

=== Magazine ===
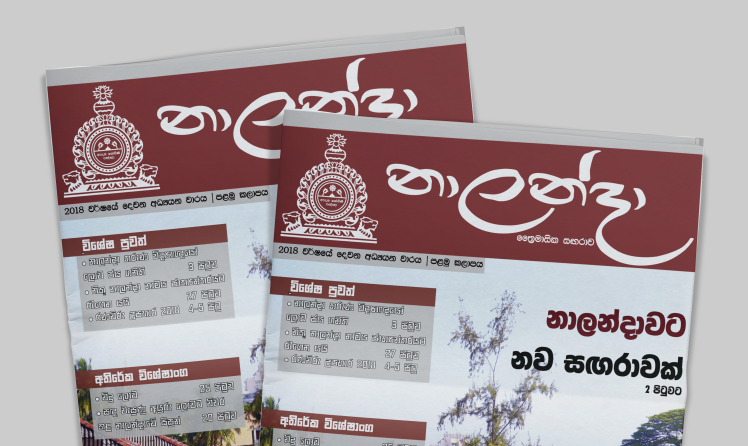
Nalanda Magazine

'Nalanda' magazine started as a bimonthly magazine to bring forth the language skills of Nalanda young journalists, presumably with the foundation introduced with 'Nalanda Pravurthi' and 'Nalanda Sangarawa' in the early days of Nalanda College. The magazine continued until its final issue in 1978. It started again as a newspaper in 1998 June following the guidance of the principal at that time: Mr. Edward Ranasinghe. Under the motto 'Sin: විමර්ශනාත්මක මනසකින් යුතු මාධ්‍යවේදීන් බිහි වේවා.' (Let journalists with an investigative mind be born) this newspaper captured peer fame as writers from surrounding schools were also encouraged to write articles for the magazine.

In October 2012, the first issue of 'Livseriya' (Sihhala: ලිව්සැරිය): a trimonthly newspaper, was published by Nalanda College Communication Unit under the directions of the principal Mr. J. H. M. W. Ranjith Jayasundara, only to be canceled after the first issue.

Despite the previous setbacks, Nalanda College Communication Unit relaunched the 'Nalanda' trimonthly magazine in 2018, this time with a steady foundation to ensure a continuous publication. The magazine continues to publish until the present enabling the linguistic development of students, teachers, and past pupils of Nalanda College.

=== Television Broadcasts ===
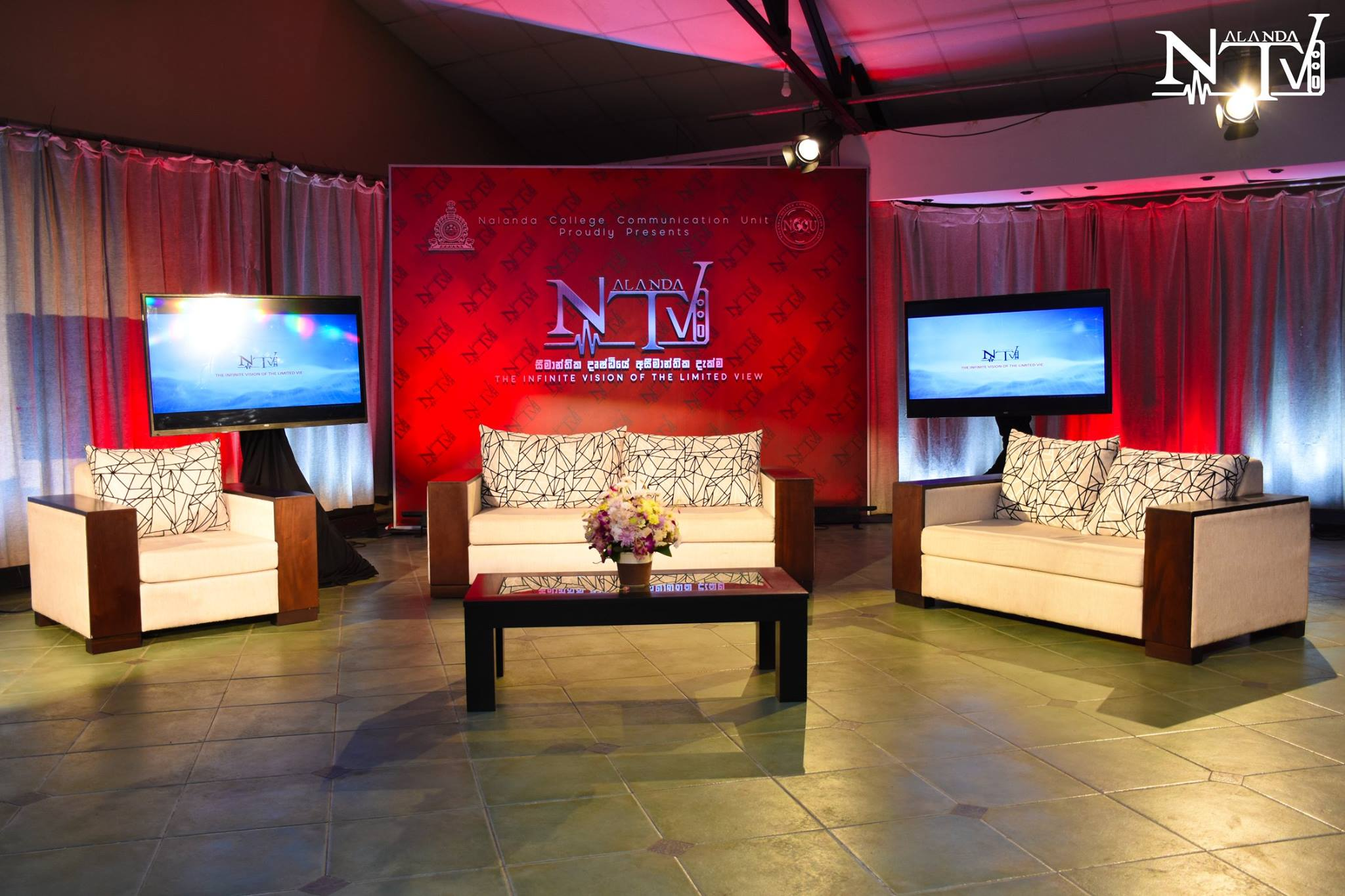
(Nalanda TV) NTV 2019

- 2005 – Nalanda TV (Sri Lanka's first ever school TV broadcast)
- 2008 – Nalanda TV (Sri Lanka’s first-ever school TV broadcast using Chroma Technology)
- 2009 – Nalanda TV
- 2012 – Nalanda TV (Sri Lanka’s first-ever school TV broadcast using IPTV Technology)
- 2013 – Nalanda TV
- 2019 – Nalanda TV
- 2021 – Nalanda TV

=== Radio Stations ===
- 1996 – Ecstasy of Nalanda
- 1997 – Nalandasara
- 1998 – Nalandasara
- 1999 – Nalandasara
- 1999 – Broadcasting of a radio channel parallel to the 75th anniversary of Nalanda College
- 2001 – Ecstasy of Nalanda
- 2005 – Nalandasara
- 2006 – Nalandasara
- 2007 – Nalandasara (Sri Lanka’s first-ever school Web Radio broadcast)
- 2008 – Nalandasara
- 2010 – Nalandasara
- 2011 – Nalandasara
- 2012 – Nalandasara
- 2025 – Nalandasara(Centenary Celebration of Nalanda College)

=== All-island Bilingual Announcing Competitions and Media Days ===
- 2004 – Sambhasha
- 2005 – Sambhasha
- 2006 – Sambhasha
- 2007 – Sambhasha
- 2008 – Sambhasha
- 2009 – Sambhasha
- 2010 – Sambhasha
- 2011 – Sambhasha
- 2012 – Sambhasha Twenty'12
- 2013 – Sambhasha
- 2014 – Sambhasha
- 2015 – Sambhasha
- 2016 – Sambhasha
- 2017 – Sambhasha
- 2023 – Sambhasha
- 2024 – Sambhasha

=== Board of Officials of the Communication Unit ===
The Board of Officials is responsible for the administration of the Nalanda College Communication Unit. Each year the old batch resigns after nourishing their successors with the customs and traditions of the supremacy since 1986.

==== Presidents of the Communication Unit ====
Name	Year
Mahendra Padmakumara	2004/2005
Ruwan Kumanayaka	2005/2006
Dananjaya Weerasinghe	2006/2007
Tilan Liyanage	2007/2008
Thilina Disanayake	2008/2009
Shan Piyumal	2009/2010
Gihan Samarawickrama	2010/2011
Ranga Dunuwila	2011/2012
Eranda Sanchagodage	2012/2013
Yasas Vimukthi Gunawardana	2013/2014
Tharindu Ransika	2014/2015
Kanishka Nirmal	2014/2015
Ruchira Warnakulasooriya	2015/2016
Kasun Abeykoon	2016/2017
Sahan Vishwajith de Alwis	2017/2018
Chethiya Korala	2018/2019
Akila Arampath	2019/2020
Dasun Sankalpa	2020/2021
Hiruna Chathurya	2022/2023
Sasindu Dilshan	2023/2024
Shalin Piyumal	2024/2025
Kisara Vonal	2026/2027

==== 2026/2027 - Board of Officials of the Communication Unit (Current) ====
Position	Name
Principal	U.D.Iran Champika Silva
Chief Instructor	Ven. K.Sumedha Thero
Chief Teacher In Charge	Gayani Mirihagalla
Teachers In Charge	Wasana Payagala, Ayomi Kandegedara, Ramya Wanigasekara
President	Kisara Vonal
Secretary	Yehen Wijewarnakula
Treasurer	Nisith Gamage
Vice President	Dananja Mihiran
Chief Organizer	Tharusha Alwis
Organizers	Pabod Sanjuna Manohara,Senehas Dissanayake,Naditha Bimulaka,Thisuka Weerakoodi
Chief Co-ordinator	Nethula Dissanayake
Co-ordinators	Saviru Hemachandra,Sanija Damwin,Binuka Thennakoon,Tharul Bandara

=== Old Nalandians' Communication Unit ===
Nalanda College has many gifted alumni and among them, there are many people associated with the industry of communication:

Name	Notability
Denzil Peiris	Editor of The Ceylon Observer (1961-1970)
Chitrananda Abeysekera	Poet, former Director of Sinhala Service of the Sri Lanka Broadcasting Corporation
Karunaratne Abeysekera	Poet, songwriter, created history in the world of radio by being the first-ever Sinhala cricket commentator over airwaves of Radio CeylonÄ
Premasara Epasinghe	Cricket Commentator, Private Secretary and Media Consultant to Minister of Education, former Head of Public Relations Bank of Ceylon
Rajeewa Jayaweera	Newspaper Columnist
Srimath Indrajith Liyanage	Television and radio presenter; actor
Palitha Perera	Former Deputy Director General (Commercial) of Sri Lanka Rupavahini Corporation, former Director of Sinhala Service Sri Lanka Broadcasting Corporation and a cricket commentator
Suwanda H. J. Sugunasiri	Columnist of Toronto Star, Ontario, Canada
Nalaka Vithanage	Theatre, television and cinema director
Siri Perera	"Siri Aiya" of Radio Ceylon
Gunadasa Amarasekara	Writer, poet and a dental surgeon

== Campbell Place ==
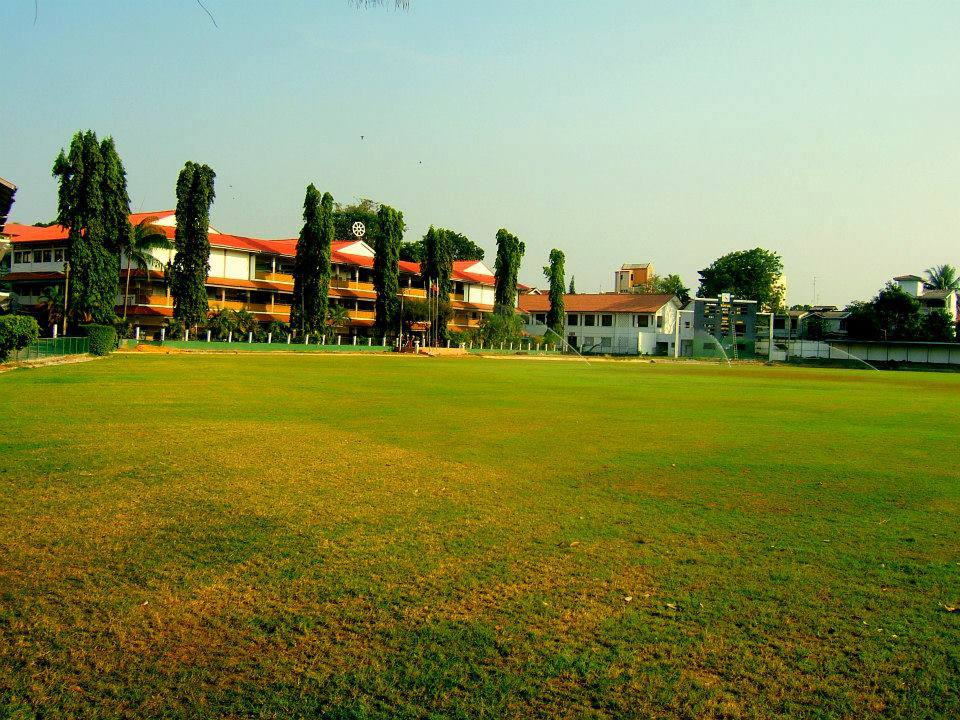
Nalanda College Play Ground, Campbell Place

The College's playground, Campbell Place, is named after Sir George William Campbell, the first Inspector General of Police of British Ceylon. The adjoining road, previously called Campbell Place, has been renamed Ananda Rajakaruna Mawatha, in recognition of Ananda Rajakaruna, a pioneer of Sinhala poetry.

== Sports ==
Nalanda College has a playground at Campbell Place, a sports complex, a squash court, a swimming pool, a shooting range, a boxing ring, and other sports facilities including:

- Athletics
- Archery
- Badminton
- Baseball
- Basketball
- Boxing
- Cadet Platoon
- Cadet Band
- Chess
- Gymnastics
- Hockey
- Martial Arts – Karate, Wushu
- Rugby Football
- Rowing
- Rifle Shooting
- Soccer (Football)
- Squash
- Swimming
- Tennis
- Volleyball
- Water Polo

=== Cricket ===
==== Battle of the Maroons ====
The encounter was first played in 1924, and is since played as a three-day encounter, starting from 2025 (the 95th in the series - the match was not played in 1943, 1944,1945, and 1948 due to World War II, with matches being held at the Singhalese Sports Club grounds). Nalanda is the current holder of the trophy, having won it in 2022 under the leadership of Dineth Samaraweera. The first Battle of the Maroons was played in 1925, and B.S. Perera led Nalandians while N M Perera led Anandians. Nalanda won the inaugural contest. Sri Lanka's first Test cricket captain, Bandula Warnapura, an alumnus of the college, while Arjuna Ranatunga, who captained the Sri Lankans in the World Cup victory in 1996, was also an alumnus. In 2025, the 95th encounter ended in a draw. The Battle of the Maroons 48th one-day encounter was played in 2025, and was abandoned due to rain. In 1951, Stanley Jayasinghe became the first Nalandian to represent the All Ceylon Cricket Team while still being a schoolboy playing against Pakistan in Pakistan.

The match is contested for the Dr. N. M. Perera Memorial Trophy. The one-day 50-over match is played for the P de S Kularatne trophy.

==== Nalanda vs Trinity ====
The annual cricket match between Nalanda College, Colombo, and Trinity College, Kandy, was played for the Mahela-Sanga Trophy.

=== Water polo ===
Nalanda plays its annual water polo encounter with Royal College, Colombo for the Royal-Nalanda Challenge Shield. The inaugural encounter was played in 2017.

=== Golf ===
Nalanda College plays its annual Golf tourney with Ananda College Colombo at Royal Colombo Golf Club.

== Clubs and societies ==
- Aeronautical Society
- Buddhist Association
- Communication Unit
- Computer Society
- Commerce Society
- Dancing Circle
- Commerce Society
- English Debating Society
- English Drama Circle
- Interact Club
- Leo Club
- Life Saving Club
- Prefects Guild
- Photographic & Art Society
- Science Society
- Scouts Troop
- Western Music Association

== Principals ==
The college principals are appointed by the Ministry of Education Sri Lanka.

Name	Assumed office	Left office	Notes
L. H. Mettananda	1925	1926	Ananda Principal Patrick de Silva Kularatne's unofficial appointment as Principal of Ananda's Branch
Gunapala Malalasekara	1926	1927	First Officially Registered Principal under new independent institution named Nalanda Academic, scholar and diplomat known for his Malalasekara English-Sinhala Dictionary
G. K. W. Perera	1927	1928	Ceylonese lawyer, educator, politician and diplomat
J. N. Jinendradasa	1928	1946	
D. C. Lowris	1947	1952	
M. de S. Jayarathne	1953	1955	
M. W. Karunananda	1956	1962	
K. M. W. Kuruppu	1962	1963	
D. J. Edirisinghe	1963	1964	
Gunapala Wickramaratne	1964	1969	Later became Commissioner of Examinations
Sugunadasa Athukorala	1969	1982	
Dharma Gunasinghe	1982	1990	
D. G. Sumanasekera	1990	1994	Later became first Principal of Vidura College Colombo
Edward Ranasinghe	1994	1999	
Hemantha Premathilaka	1999	2010	Later became Additional Secretary Ministry of Education
Ranjith Jayasundara	2010	2017	
Thilak Waththuhewa	2017	2020	
H. Maheshika Wijerathne (acting Principal)	2020	2021	
Thilak Waththuhewa	2021	2023	Later became Principal of Royal College, Colombo
Iran Champika de Silva	2023	Present	

== Notable staff ==
Statue of Balangoda Ananda Maitreya Thero

Name	Notes
Balangoda Ananda Maitreya Mahanayake Thero	Vice Chancellor of Vidyodaya University, Chancellor of Sabaragamuwa University of Sri Lanka
Polwatte Buddhadatta Mahanayake Thero	Professor of Buddhist philosophy at Vidyalankara University
S. Mahinda Thero	Poet, author, and participated in the Sri Lankan independence movement
Dr A. T. Ariyaratne	Founder of the Sarvodaya Shramadana Movement
Sagara Palansuriya	Poet, teacher and Member of Parliament
Edward Jayakody	Musician, singer, composer, and occasional actor
Premasara Epasinghe	Cricket commentator and journalist
S. Panibharatha	Dancer and choreographer
Siri Perera	Criminal lawyer, former Sri Lanka High Commissioner
Somalatha Subasinghe	Actress, playwright, theatre director

== Notable alumni ==
Past students who have studied at Nalanda College Colombo are referred to as Old Nalandians.

== War Memorial and remembrance ==
Nalanda College War Memorial Statue

Each year, students and alumni commemorate the loss of 41 alumni who died in the Sri Lankan civil war. A war memorial is situated between the main oldest buildings of the college.

== Nalanda College Junior Old Boys' Association ==
The association serves the alumni of the college. Its objective is to promote the interests of the college and its past and present students by fostering relationships among alumni and with their alma mater. Each year, the union organises events such as Future Minds, Nalanda Walk, the Olcott Memorial Old Boys' Cricket Tourney, and the Ranaviru Upahara.

== See also ==
- Education in Sri Lanka
