= John Ferguson (newspaper proprietor) =

British newspaper proprietor and writer (1842–1913)

John Ferguson CMG
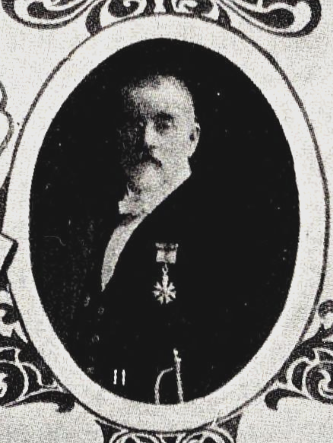
- Circa 1903
- Born: 1 December 1842; Tain, Scotland
- Died: 17 October 1913 (aged 70); Chilworth, Surrey
- Occupations: Newspaper proprietor and writer
- Children: 2 sons and 2 daughters

John Ferguson CMG (1 December 1842 – 17 October 1913) was a British newspaper proprietor, journalist and writer in British Ceylon.

== Early life and education ==
Ferguson was born on 1 December 1842 in Tain, Scotland. He was educated at Tain Royal Academy and won the Matheson Gold Medal for mathematics at the age of 13.

== Career ==
Ferguson began his journalistic career at Inverness. In 1861, he went to Colombo, Ceylon to join his uncle, J.M. Ferguson, who was the proprietor of The Ceylon Observer newspaper. In 1879 he was taken into partnership and the management of the newspaper devolved almost entirely on him. On the death of his uncle in 1892 he became sole proprietor.

Described as "the doyen of British journalists in the East", for 36 years, he was Ceylon correspondent for the Times, having begun his connection with the newspaper in 1870 when he sent in a report about a ship-wreck off the Point de Galle.

He was also the author of numerous publications. In 1863, he took over from his uncle the "Ceylon Handbook and Directory" which he grew to 1,800 pages, and was for many years regarded as the most useful book of its kind. In 1881, he founded the monthly journal the "Tropical Agriculturalist", and wrote several guidebooks about Ceylon including the "Illustrated Handbook of Ceylon", and "Ceylon in 1883", and provided information about Ceylon to the Encyclopædia Britannica. He was Ceylon's representative at the St Louis Exposition in 1904. He was President of the Ceylon branch of the Royal Asiatic Society, and life member of the British Association, the Society of Arts, and the Royal Colonial Institute.

In 1902, he was nominated as an unofficial member of the Ceylon Legislative Council, serving until his retirement in 1908. He was known for his promotion of education, and for his agitation against licensed opium shops and the spirit monopoly.

== Personal life and death ==
Ferguson married Charlotte Haddon in 1871, and together they had two sons and two daughters. After she died in 1903, in 1905 he married Elaine Marianne Smith. He died on 17 October 1913 at Chilworth, Surrey.

== Honours ==
Ferguson was appointed Companion of the Order of St Michael and St George (CMG) in the 1903 Birthday Honours.
