= Future Minds =

Career guidance event in Sri Lanka

- Founded: 2006
- Type: Social Responsibility Project
- Purpose: Education and careers guidance
- Location: Future Minds Secretariat, Colombo, Sri Lanka
- Origins: Nalanda College Colombo career guidance programmes
- Region served: Sri Lanka
- Method: Exhibitions, publication, web portal
- Owner: Nalanda College Junior Old Boys Association
- Website: futureminds.lk

Future Minds, organised by the Junior Old Boys association of Nalanda College Colombo in collaboration with Government of Sri Lanka, is an annual three-day Educational and Career Guidance Exhibition in Sri Lanka held at Bandaranaike Memorial International Conference Hall, Colombo. Kandy City Centre and Galle Municipal Council host secondary exhibitions for the same following the primary one in Colombo.

== Recognition and patronage ==
This exhibition is patronaged by the Office of the President of Sri Lanka and is endorsed by the Ministries of Education, Vocational & Technical Training, Mass Media & Information and Posts and Telecommunication.

== History and objectives ==
The exhibition started as a job bank and career guidance programme for senior students of Nalanda College Colombo in 2000. It expanded in 2006 and was named Future Minds, with the motto "No one is left behind".

Its aim was to provide a one-stop stage for students in Sri Lanka to meet with Higher Educational and Tertiary Educational Institutes (Government and Private) and make educated choices about their Career Development, helping them to become part of a highly skilled national workforce for Sri Lanka.

Students from universities in Australia, the United Kingdom, the United States, Japan, Malaysia, New Zealand, Russia, China and India also attend the exhibition.
