= Mawilmada =

Coordinates: 7°20′N 80°38′E

- Village
- Interactive map of Mawilmada
- Country: Sri Lanka
- Province: Central Province
- Time zone: UTC+5:30 (Sri Lanka Standard Time)

Mawilmada is a village in Sri Lanka. It is located within the district of Kandy in the Central Province.

== Education ==
- Colombo International School of Kandy
- Risikala Aesthetic College
- Mawil Mada Maha Viddiyalaya

== See also ==
- List of towns in Central Province, Sri Lanka
