= Dinamina =

Sri Lankan newspaper

- Type: Daily newspaper
- Format: Broadsheet
- Owner: Associated Newspapers of Ceylon Limited
- Editor: Gamini Jayalath
- Founded: 1909
- Language: Sinhala
- Headquarters: 35, D. R. Wijewardena Mawatha, Colombo 10, Sri Lanka
- Circulation: 75,000
- Sister newspapers: Sunday Observer; Daily News; Silumina; Thinakaran
- Website: dinamina.lk

Dinamina (Sinhala: දිනමිණ) is a Sinhala language daily newspaper in Sri Lanka. It is published by the Associated Newspapers of Ceylon Limited (Lake House), a government-owned corporation. The newspaper commenced publishing in 1909. It was founded by the Sinhalese scholar H. S. Perera who acted as both owner and editor-in-chief of the paper at the outset. Upon Perera's death in December 1914, D. R. Wijewardena (who would later go on to become a prominent figure in the country's struggle for independence) bought out the company. It is now owned by the government of Sri Lanka.

The newspaper's offices were located initially at First Cross Street, Colombo, and was printed at the Lankabhimanava Vishrutha Press. Later, Wijewardene bought a larger area of land elsewhere in Colombo, and built 'Lake House' building, which then became home to the offices of the Dinamina, along with several other newspapers that Wijewardene began, including the Sri Lankan English daily, the Daily News. Despite the plethora of newspapers based in the building, it became known as the 'Dinamina Kantoruva' in Sinhala, meaning 'Dinamina Centre'. The price of a copy was three cents in Ceylonese rupees at the time of its launch.

The newspaper is published as a broadsheet, with photographs printed both in color and black and white. Weekday printings include the main section, containing news on national affairs, international affairs, business, political analysis, sports, editorials and opinions. Separate sections contain classifieds, and, depending on the city it is distributed in, local (metropolitan) news. Since 26 January 2020 the editor-in-chief of the daily Dinamina is Gamini Jayalath. Previously, it was held by Pushpa Rowel and she was the first woman to rise to the rank of the Chief Editor of a Sinhala national newspaper.

== See also ==
- List of newspapers in Sri Lanka
- Associated Newspapers of Ceylon
