= Thinakaran =

Daily Tamil Newspaper from Sri Lanka

- Logo of Thinakaran
- Type: Daily newspaper
- Format: Print, online
- Owner: Associated Newspapers of Ceylon Limited
- Founded: 15 March 1932
- Language: Tamil
- Headquarters: 35, D. R. Wijewardena Mawatha, Colombo 10, Sri Lanka
- Circulation: 50,000 (Thinakaran); 70,000 (Thinakaran Varamanjari)
- Sister newspapers: Sunday Observer; Silumina; Dinamina; Daily News
- Website: thinakaran.lk

Thinakaran is a daily Tamil newspaper in Sri Lanka. It is published by Associated Newspapers of Ceylon Limited. Its sister newspaper are Sunday Observer, Silumina, Dinamina and Daily News. The daily newspaper has a circulation of 50,000 and its Sunday version, Thinakaran Varamanjari, 70,000 per issue.

== See also ==
- List of newspapers in Sri Lanka
