= Dinesh Weerawansa =

- Born: June 17, 1966 (age 60); Negombo, Sri Lanka
- Education: Royal College Colombo, Thomson Foundation, UK; University of Athens
- Occupations: Editor-in-Chief, Sunday Observer / Former Chief Editor; Daily News (Sri Lanka)

Dinesh Weerawansa (born 17 June 1966) is a Sri Lankan editor-in chief for the Sunday Observer. He returned as editor-in-chief of the Sunday Observer in December 2019 for his second term. He held the position previously for nine years from 2006 to 2015. At the Sunday Observer, he headed the editorial operation of Sri Lanka's oldest and largest circulated English newspaper - published by the Associated Newspapers of Ceylon Limited. He had also functioned as chief editor of the Daily News (2018) and also as their associate editor and sports editor. He was a visiting lecturer at National Olympic Academy of Sri Lanka.

== Early life and education ==
Weerawansa was born to W. Cosmas Damian (Teachers' Training College Lecturer) and Mercy Edna (English-trained teacher) on 17 June 1966 at Negombo, Sri Lanka. A Navodaya scholar, he was educated at the Royal College, Colombo - Senior College Prefect 1984/85 and Hostel Prefects' Advisor 1984/86. He then pursued further studies at the Thomson Foundation in the UK, and graduated from the International Olympic Academy (IOA), affiliated to the University of Athens. In 1994, he was selected by the Ministry of Foreign Affairs in Japan to represent Sri Lanka at the South Asian Youth Exchange program. Only Sri Lankan media personality to be trained in the world-renowned IOA in Athena, Greece. Holds a diploma in sports leadership conducted by the International Olympic Committee (IOC).

== Career ==
He is an honorary member of the International Taekwon-Do Federation. He has been a Sri Lankan Sports Editor / sports journalist for over three and a half decades and is also the IAAF athletic correspondent for Sri Lanka. He has covered seven editions of the Olympic Games (1992, 2000, 2004, 2008, 2012, 2016 and 2020), eight IAAF World Athletic Championships (2001, 2003, 2005, 2007, 2009, 2011, 2013 and 2015) and six Asian Games (1994, 1998, 2002, 2006, 2010 and 2014).

Weerawansa has covered many milestone events in Sri Lanka sport, including Susanthika Jayasinghe winning the 2000 Sydney Olympic Games silver medal and 2007 World Championship bronze medal as well as Damayanthi Darsha and Sugath Tillakaratne winning gold medals for Sri Lanka (3) after 25 years at 1998 Bangkok Asian Games. He had also served as a radio and television commentator at several international events, including Olympic Games, Asian Games, South Asian Games and Test/ ODI international cricket matches and represented Sri Lanka at the Asian Sports Press Union Congress in Seoul in 1990 and 1992 and South Asian Sports Association in Dhaka, 1993 - was elected Chairman of its Cricket Commission.

== International assignments as a media personality & Sports assignments ==
- XXVth Olympic Games in Barcelona, 1992
- XXV11 Olympic Games in Sydney, 2000
- XXV111 Olympic Games in Athens, 2004
- XX1X Olympic Games in Beijing, 2008
- XXX Olympic Games in London, 2012
- XXX1 Olympic Games in Rio de Janeiro, 2016
- XXX11 Olympic Games in Tokyo, 2020
- 8th IAAF World Championships in Edmonton, 2001
- 9th IAAF World Championships in Paris-Saint Dennis, 2003
- 10th IAAF World Championships in Helsinki, 2005
- 11th IAAF World Championships in Osaka, 2007
- 12th IAAF World Championships in Berlin, 2009
- 13th IAAF World Championships in Daegu, 2011
- 14th IAAF World Championships in Moscow, 2013
- 15th IAAF World Championships in Beijing, 2015
- 11th Asian Games in Hiroshima, 1994
- 12th Asian Games in Bangkok, 1998
- 13th Asian Games in Busan, 2002
- 14th Asian Games in Doha, 2006
- 15th Asian Games in Guangzhou, 2010
- 16th Asian Games in Incheon, 2014
- Asian Athletic Championships in Manila, 1993
- South Asian Games in Dhaka, 1993
- Asian Athletic Grand Prix Manila, 2007

== General assignments ==
- Commonwealth Heads of Government Meeting (CHOGM) in Perth, 2011
- President Mahinda Rajapaksa's state visit to Japan, 2007
