= Alvai =

Alvai அல்வாய்
- Village
- Location within Northern Province
- Coordinates: 9°49′0″N 80°12′0″E
- Country: Sri Lanka
- Province: Northern
- District: Jaffna
- DS Division: Vadamarachchi South‐West

Alvai or Alvaay (Tamil: அல்வாய் Alvāy) is a coastal village in Vadamaraadchi, northern Jaffna Peninsula, Sri Lanka. It is located 30 kilometers (19 mi) from the city of Jaffna or 5 kilometers (3.1 mi) from the town of Point Pedro.

Panai Munai (Point Palmyra), the northernmost point of Sri Lanka, is in Alvai.

== Folklore ==
In Dvapara Yuga (ended in 3102 BCE), Tarahan, the younger (third) son of Kasiyappa Munivar and Mayadevi, captured Nagatheevu & built a strong fortress and ruled from there. Tarakan was very strong (elephant like), that's why his fortress was called Anaikottai. Tarakan devotedly worshipped god Shiva in deep meditation. As a result, he ruled Anaikottai for many thousand years (as stated in the Puranam). In the deeper time of the past, men lived very long. Tarakan married Chowri and she was his queen. Their offspring was a son named Asurendran.

The Devas could not defeat the Asuras. The devas made their way to Mahakailasam and worshipped God Shiva with melting hearts. From Shiva's third eye six sparks streaked out. Gods Shiva commanded Agni (fire) and Vayu (Wind) carried the six sparks and placed them in the river. The river swirled and carried the sparks through Kantharodai to Saravanai lake (Lotus Lake) when the six sparks reached the lake dried up, the lake which thus dried up is called Valukkai Aru, the meaning of Valukkai in Tamil means bereft, the lake has no water. The six-sparks (Murugan) was cherished and nursed by Karthigai maids by feeding him with milk. They were Murugan's foster mothers. Where the Saravanai lake was the place was called Saravanai between lake Saravanai and River Valukkai the sea splashes.

The young Murugan grew up and mother Parvathi gave the pointed spear (vel), that place is called Velanai. Murugan was growing up there. Then, he went to Mahakailasam with his mother Parvati and paid his loving respect to his father Shiva. In response to Shiva's command, Murugan organized himself into warrior stance and warred with Tarakan. Tarakan entered Mount Kraunja and concealed himself. The opening in Mount Kraunja was merged in darkness and was called Alvai. From this gaping entrance, Alvai Mount Kraunja was to the north east Mount Kraunja was a massive magic cave. When Lord Muruga came down from Mount Kailas with his massive assisting warriors, the contingent camped at Senthitsannathi, which was later known as Sellachannithi. It was from here that Murugan destroyed Mount Kraunja. On the destruction of ‘Mount Kraunja’ Tarakan came out. At the nearby Mayapuri (open space) the two battled fiercely. Murugan attacked Tarakan's neck with his vel (spear), the chain as which was around Tarakan's neck broke up and the pendant which was Vishnu's chakkrayutham fell to the ground. At last King Tarakan of great strength moved into the heaven for his Valour. Where the battle was fought was at Mayakkai, Vadmaradchi. Where his Vishnu's weapon chakrayutham broke up and fell was the village of Vallinachchi. Very much later Vallinachiyar found this shattered weapon (Chakrayathan) was ceremoniously placed at a temple and worshipped and this place of worship of chakrayutham was called Vallipuram. This place of worship Vallipuram was called Vallipura alvar Kovil.

Intellectual opinion like those of Pandithamani Kanapathipillai referred to Jaffna's culture as Kandapurana Culture, is suggestive of this consecration of the above his body. The pointed spear (vel) with which Murugan battled Tarakan from his battling centre is Sellachchanithi. Also where Vallinachchi consecrated the chakrayutham for worship is Vallipuram Temple. This form of worship with the symbols of the divine is Traditional Tamil Worship. These places of worship, although not erected in accordance with northern Sanskrit scriptural mode, worshipers receive and experience divine grace and have attained fame as a result of the blessings poured onto the worshipers.

The Devas had been defeated by Tarakan and imprisoned by him and treated as slaves. Devas worshiped Vishnu (Thirumal) for these defeated Deva and Vishnu warred with Tarakan who defeated him and wrested the ‘Chakrayutham’ from him. With a 1000 flowers Thirumal (Vishnu) worshipped Shiva for the returning to him of the weapon chakrayutham. Thirumal who conducted the worship with a 1000 Lotus flowers at last found that one flower was short to conduct the poojah (worship). At once he plucked his eye and completed the worship. Shiva understanding this granted him the chakrayutham.
