= Palitha Perera =

Sri Lankan broadcaster

- Born: 3 September 1942 (age 83); Nugegoda Sri Lanka
- Education: Nalanda College Colombo
- Occupation: Broadcaster
- Known for: Cricket commentaries

Palitha Perera (also known as Kuruppuge Palitha Chandrasiri Perera) is a well known cricket commentator and media personality in Sri Lanka.

== Early life and education ==
Palitha who was born 3 September 1942 in Nugegoda received his education from Nalanda College, Colombo. Palitha also represented Nalanda for 32nd Ananda-Nalanda big match.

== Career ==
Palitha holds the distinction of having been the inaugural announcer on two Sri Lankan TV channels – Rupavahini (15 February 1982) and TNL TV (21 July 1993).

He was also former Deputy Director General (Commercial) of Sri Lanka Rupavahini Corporation, former Director of Sinhala Service Sri Lanka Broadcasting Corporation.

Palitha Perera completed 50 years of his Sinhala cricket commentary on 3 March 2013 at SSC Colombo. On 11 December 2020, he was honored with the Gold Lifetime Achievement award at the 'Sabuddhi Sports Literary Awards'.
