= Sunday Observer (Sri Lanka) =

Sri Lankan English-language newspaper

- Type: Weekly newspaper
- Format: Broadsheet
- Owner: Associated Newspapers of Ceylon Limited
- Editor: Pramod De Silva
- Founded: 1834
- Language: English
- Headquarters: 35, D. R. Wijewardena Mawatha, Colombo 10, Sri Lanka
- Country: Sri Lanka
- Circulation: 175,000 (February 2012)
- Sister newspapers: Daily News; Dinamina; Silumina; Thinakaran
- Website: sundayobserver.lk

Sunday Observer is a weekly English-language newspaper in Sri Lanka, published on Sundays. The Sunday Observer and its sister newspapers the Daily News, Dinamina, Silumina and Thinakaran are published by Associated Newspapers of Ceylon Limited (Lake House), a government-owned corporation. The paper, which was established in the present-day format in 1928, has roots that date back to 1834 when Sri Lanka was under the British rule. It is the second-oldest Sri Lankan newspaper in circulation after the Government Gazette. The current editor is Pramod De Silva.

== History ==
=== Origins ===
The British captured the coastal areas of Sri Lanka in 1796 and had consolidated their power throughout the island by 1818. In 1829 the Colonial Office appointed the Colebrooke-Cameron Commission to evaluate the administration of the country under the Governor of Ceylon, Edward Barnes, and to recommend reforms.

The commission's recommendations, presented in 1833, marked the beginning of the modern period of Sri Lanka. One was to launch independent newspapers to limit the sweeping powers enjoyed by the governor. At that time, the only newspaper in circulation was The Government Gazette of Ceylon, which had been published in British-controlled areas in Sri Lanka (then Ceylon) since 1802.

As a result of the commission's recommendations the newly arrived governor, Robert Wilmot-Horton, started to publish a newspaper named the Colombo Journal in January 1832. However it was closed down by the British government in 1833 on the grounds that there was a need for an independent newspaper industry. To fill the vacuum created by the discontinuation of the Colombo Journal, two merchants of Colombo, G. Ackland and E. J. Darley, founded a biweekly named The Observer and Commercial Advertiser.

=== 19th century ===
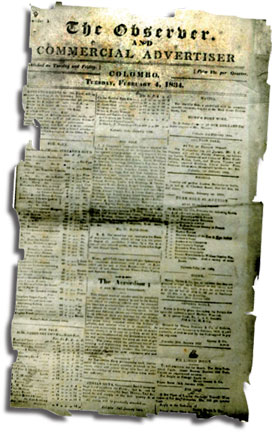
Front page of The Observer and Commercial Advertiser first issue of 4 February 1834.

This paper, first published on 4 February 1834, was edited by E. J. Darley and George Winter. The paper was charged with libel in the same year for criticising the superintendent of police, but the case was rejected by the courts. Christoper Elliott, who was the colonial surgeon serving at Badulla, was appointed editor-in-chief of the newspaper in 1835. Later he changed its name to Colombo Observer. The paper was heavily critical of the government. At the time of the 1848 Matale Rebellion the newspaper even reported that the sacred Tooth Relic in Kandy had been destroyed by the British forces. The paper, which became the first daily in Ceylon by 1873, was slanted towards the planters of central highlands.

=== 20th century ===
D. R. Wijewardena, a business magnate and press baron, bought the Colombo Observer and restored its name as the Ceylon Observer in 1923. Wijewardena ultimately established a media network called "Lake House" consisting of 7 newspapers: Dinamina, Silumina, Ceylon Daily News, Observer, Sunday Observer, Thinakaran and Sunday Thinakaran (Thinakaran Varamanjari). In 1973, the government of Sirimavo Bandaranaike nationalised the company by the Associated Newspapers of Ceylon (Special Provisions) Act No.28. A. K. Premadasa was appointed its first chairman.

=== 21st century ===
The newspaper is now published online as well as in print form. It conducts several competitions annually including Schoolboy Cricketer of the Year. As of February 2012, the paper had a circulation of 175,000 copies per week.

== Supplements ==
The paper comes with an array of supplements, including News Features, Features, Sports, Business, Education, Marriage Proposals, Muse Magazine and Observer Junior.

== Editors ==
List of journalists who served as the newspaper's editor-in-chief:

- E. J. Darley (1834)
- George Winter (1834)
- Christopher Elliott (1835–1859)
- A. M. Ferguson (1859–1865)
- John Ferguson (1865–1867)
- R. H. Ferguson
- Charles Tower
- C. Drieberg (1923–1924)
- P. B. Marshall
- J. D. Quirk
- H. A. J. Hulugalle (1930–1931)
- H. D. Jansz (1931–1952)
- Tarzi Vittachchi (1953–1961)
- Denzil Peiris (1961–1970)
- Ernest Corea (1970–1973)
- Philip Cooray (1973)
- Lionel Fernando (1973–1977)
- Harold Pieris (1977–1988)
- Leslie Dahanayake (1988–1990)
- H. L. D. Mahindapala (1990–1994)
- Ajith Samaranayake (1994)
- Lakshman Gunasekara (1994–1999)
- Jayatilleke de Silva (1999–2006)
- Rajpal Abeynayake (2006)
- Dinesh Weerawansa (2006–2015)
- Lakshman Gunasekera (2015–2017)
- Chandani Jayatillake (2017–2018)
- Dharisha Bastians (2017-2018)
- Dinesh Weerawansa (2018)
- Dharisha Bastians (2018-2019)
- Dinesh Weerawansa (2019-2022)
- Pramod De Silva (2022 - To date)

== See also ==
- List of newspapers in Sri Lanka
