= Silumina =

Sri Lankan weekly newspaper

- Silumina front page
- Type: Daily newspaper
- Format: Broadsheet
- Owner: Associated Newspapers of Ceylon Limited
- Editor: Dharman Wickramaratne
- Founded: 1930
- Language: Sinhala
- Headquarters: 35, D. R. Wijewardena Mawatha, Colombo 10, Sri Lanka
- Circulation: 265,000
- Sister newspapers: Sunday Observer; Daily News; Dinamina; Thinakaran
- Website: silumina.lk

Silumina (Sinhala: සිළුමිණ) is a Sinhala language weekly newspaper in Sri Lanka. It is published by the Associated Newspapers of Ceylon Limited (Lake House), a government-owned corporation. The newspaper commenced publishing on March 30, 1930, D. R. Wijewardena being its founder. It currently has a circulation of 265,000. Famous novelists like Martin Wickramasinghe have served as its editor. Since 20 January 2020, Dharman Wickramaratne is the editor.

== See also ==
- List of newspapers in Sri Lanka
