= Daily News (Sri Lanka) =

English language newspaper in Sri Lanka

- Type: Daily newspaper
- Format: Broadsheet
- Owner: Associated Newspapers of Ceylon Limited
- Editor: Kesara Abeywardena
- Founded: 1918
- Language: English
- Headquarters: 35, D. R. Wijewardena Mawatha, Colombo 10, Sri Lanka
- Circulation: 88,000
- Sister newspapers: Sunday Observer; Dinamina; Silumina; Thinakaran
- Website: dailynews.lk

The Daily News is an English-language newspaper in Sri Lanka. It is now published by the Associated Newspapers of Ceylon Limited (Lake House), a government-owned corporation. Founded by D. R. Wijewardena, the newspaper began publishing on 3 January 1918.

The present-day newspaper is published as a broadsheet, with photographs printed both in color and black and white. Weekday printings include the main section, containing news on national affairs, international affairs, business, political analysis, sports, editorials and opinions. Every Thursday issue a free supplement in a tabloid paper called "Wisdom". In addition, the Daily News also provides The Sri Lanka Gazette as a supplement on every Friday. The current editor-in-chief of the daily news is Kesara Abeywardena.

Since its founding, the Daily News has been housed and printed in the historic, colonial-era Lakehouse Building, adjacent to Beira Lake, in the Fort district of Colombo.

During the 2018 Sri Lankan constitutional crisis, loyalists of former President Mahinda Rajapaksa seized control of the Daily News and ousted journalists who were viewed as supporters of the new regime.

== See also ==
- List of newspapers in Sri Lanka
