= List of alumni of Ananda College =

This is a list of Anandians, alumni of the Ananda College, Colombo, Sri Lanka.

== Heads of state ==
- Gotabaya Rajapaksa - 7th President of Sri Lanka

== Heads of government ==
- Ratnasiri Wickremanayake - Prime Minister of Sri Lanka (2000—2001, 2005—2010)

== National politics ==
=== Heads of legislature ===
Name	Notability	Reference(s)
Anandatissa de Alwis	Speaker of the National State Assembly of Sri Lanka (1977–1978), government minister	
Karu Jayasuriya	Speaker of the Parliament of Sri Lanka (2015–2020), government minister, former ambassador to Germany	

=== Ministers and legislators ===
==== Current ====
Government benches

Name	Notability	Reference(s)
Dullas Alahapperuma	Government Minister, Member of Parliament	
Tissa Vitharana	Member of Parliament, Leader of the Lanka Sama Samaja Party, Professor of Microbiology	
R. M. Ranjith Madduma Bandara	Minister of Public Administration and Management, Member of Parliament	
Daya Gamage	Minister of Primary Industry, Member of Parliament	
Mohan Lal Grero, MP	State Minister of University Education, Member of Parliament, educationists	
Achala Jagodage	Member of Parliament	
Ashu Marasinghe	Member of Parliament	
Ajith Perera	Deputy Minister of Power and Renewable Energy, Member of Parliament	
Arjuna Ranatunga	Cabinet Minister of Ports and Shipping, Member of Parliament, former captain of the Sri Lanka national cricket team	
Rajitha Senaratne	Cabinet Minister of Health and Indigenous Medicine, Dental surgeon	
Bimal Rathnayake	Cabinet Minister of Transport, Highways and Urban Development and Leader of the House of Parliament	
Dammika Patabendi	Cabinet Minister of Environment	

Opposition benches

Name	Notability	Reference(s)
P. Dayaratna	Member of Parliament for Ampara (1989-present)	
Gitanjana Gunawardena	Member of Parliament	
Nalaka Godahewa	Member of Parliament for Gampaha (2020-present)	
Pradeep Undugoda	Member of Parliament for Colombo (2020-present)	

=== Former ===
- Ossie Abeygunasekara – former leader of Sri Lanka Mahajana Party
- Thomas Amarasuriya – former Member of the State Council of Ceylon; President of the Senate of Ceylon
- D. P. Atapattu – former Member of Parliament for Beliatte, Secretary to the Minister of State, 1965–70
- R. M. Dharmadasa Banda – ex minister of Agriculture
- Rohitha Bogollagama – former minister of Foreign Affairs; former Member of Parliament
- General Sarath Fonseka – leader of Democratic Party; former Member of Parliament
- Tudor Gunasekara – former Member of Parliament for Mahara Electorate, District Minister for Gampaha; first Sri Lankan Ambassador to Poland, Bulgaria and Romania (note: also listed in "Diplomats")
- Philip Gunawardena – served as Minister of Agriculture in 1956 Cabinet; Minister of Fisheries
- Indradasa Hettiarachchi – former Minister of Industries
- I. M. R. A. Iriyagolla – former Minister of Education
- D. D. Athulathmudali – former Senator
- Prins Gunasekera – former Member of the Parliament
- Lakshman Jayakody – former Sri Lankan Cabinet Minister; Presidential advisor
- V. G. W. Ratnayake – former Sri Lankan MP
- P. B. G. Kalugalla – former Minister of Finance
- Wickremabahu Karunaratne – leader of the Nava Lanka Samasamaja Party; served as a Provincial Councillor representing Colombo District
- P. Kumarasiri- former Member of the Parliament
- Sanjeewa Kavirathna – former Member of Parliament; Member of Central Provincial council; Sri Lanka's first Green Awarded politician
- Weerasinghe Mallimarachchi – former Colombo District Minister; Member of Parliament (Kolonnawa)
- Imthiaz Bakeer Markar – former Cabinet Minister of Media, Postal and Telecommunications
- V. Navaratnam – former Member of Parliament
- Herbert Sri Nissanka – former Member of the Sri Lankan Parliament
- C. E. Attygalle – former Member of the Sri Lankan Parliament
- N. M. Perera – founder and leader of LSSP; former Minister of Finance
- Bharatha Lakshman Premachandra – former Member of Parliament
- V. Karalasingham – former lawyer, writer; politician
- Basil Rajapaksa – former Minister of Economic Development; Member of Parliament
- Prins Gunasekera former Member of the Sri Lankan Parliament
- Suranimala Rajapaksha – former Minister of School Education
- Lalitha Rajapakse – former Minister of Justice of Ceylon, elected Member of the Senate of Ceylon; former Sri Lankan Ambassador to France; High Commissioner to the United Kingdom
- N. R. Rajavarothiam – Ceylon Tamil politician; former Member of Parliament
- Bimal Rathnayaka – former Member of Parliament
- Dharmasiri Senanayake – former Cabinet Minister of Media, Tourism and Civil Aviation; General Secretary of the Sri Lanka Freedom Party
- William de Silva – former Cabinet Minister of Industries and Fisheries; former Ceylon High Commissioner to Canada
- T. B. Subasinghe – former Speaker of the Parliament; Cabinet Minister of Industries and Scientific Affairs
- Dingiri Bandara Welagedara – former Cabinet Minister of Plan Implementation; former Governor of North Central Province
- S. A. Wickramasinghe – former senator; founder of the Communist Party of Sri Lanka
- V. Yogeswaran – former Member of Parliament
- S. K. K. Suriarachchi - former Member of Sri Lankan Parliament
- G. K. W. Perera - Former Member of the Ceylon State Council
- K. D. David Perera - Former Member of the Sri Lankan Parliament
- Siri Andrahennady - Former Member of the Sri Lankan parliament
- Bernard Soysa - Former Member of the Sri Lankan parliament
- Noel Wimalasena - Former Member of the Sri Lankan parliament
- Piyasena Tennakoon - Former Member of the Sri Lankan parliament
- V. G. W. Ratnayake - Former Member of the Sri Lankan parliament
- C. E. Attygalle - Former Member of the Sri Lankan parliament
- S. A. Peeris - Former Member of the Sri Lankan parliament
- Noel Wimalasena - Former Member of the Sri Lankan parliament from Kandy District
- G. K. W. Perera - Former Member of the Sri Lankan Parliament
- Sanjeeva Kaviratne - Former Member of the Sri Lankan Parliament
- Dayasena Pasqual - Former Member of the Sri Lankan Parliament
- K. D. David Perera - Former Member of the Sri Lankan Parliament
- Noel Wimalasena - Former Member of the Sri Lankan Parliament
- J. D. Weerasekera - Former Member of the Sri Lankan Parliament

== Judiciary ==
Chief justice

- G. P. S. de Silva - Chief Justice of the Supreme Court of Sri Lanka
- Arthur Wijewardena - Chief Justice of the Supreme Court of Sri Lanka

Puisne justice of the Supreme Court

- Chan Htoon - Associate Justice of the Supreme Court of Burma, Attorney General of Burma, architect of the first Constitution of Burma in 1947
- V. Sivasubramaniam - Former Puisne Justice of the Supreme Court of Sri Lanka
- J. F. A. Soza - Former Puisne Justice of the Supreme Court of Sri Lanka
- P. Sriskandarajah - Former Puisne Justice of the Supreme Court of Sri Lanka
- Yasantha Kodagoda - Puisne Justice of the Supreme Court of Sri Lanka, former president of the Court of Appeal of Sri Lanka

== Provincial and local government ==
Name	Notability	Reference(s)
Anandatissa de Alwis	former Governor of North-Western Province	
V. M. Panchalingam	former District Secretary for Jaffna	
Ratnasiri Rajapakse	Mayor of Colombo (1991–1996), municipal councillor	

== Diplomats ==
Name	Notability	Reference(s)
J. B. Disanayake	linguist, Head of the Department of Sinhala, University of Colombo, Sri Lankan Ambassador to Thailand	
Tudor Gunasekara	former Member of Parliament for Mahara Electorate, District Minister for Gampaha; first Sri Lankan Ambassador to Poland, Bulgaria and Romania	
Karu Jayasuriya	former Sri Lankan Ambassador to Germany	
Wasantha Karannagoda	Sri Lankan Ambassador to Japan, Secretary Ministry of Highways and Road Development, National Security Adviser, Commander of the Navy	
Lalitha Rajapakse	Ambassador to France; High Commissioner to the United Kingdom	
Warnasena Rasaputra	former Sri Lankan Ambassador to the United States of America, France and Geneva	
Gunasena de Soyza	former Sri Lankan High Commissioner to the United Kingdom	

== Armed forces ==
=== Army ===
Name	Rank	Notability	Reference(s)
Sarath Fonseka	Field Marshal	Chief of Defence Staff of Sri Lanka Armed Forces (2009), Commander of the Sri Lankan Army (2005–2009)	
L. P. Balagalle	General	Chief of Defence Staff of Sri Lanka Armed Forces (2004–2005), Commander of the Sri Lankan Army (2000–2004)	
Hamilton Wanasinghe	General	Commander of the Sri Lankan Army (1988–1991)	
Rohan Daluwatte	General	Commander of the Sri Lankan Army (1996–1998)	
Mahesh Senanayake	General	Commander of the Sri Lankan Army (2017–2019)	
Sanjaya Wanasinghe	Major General	Chief of Staff of Sri Lanka Armed Forces (July 2023 - Oct 2023)	
Lakshman Algama	Major General	former Chief of Staff of Sri Lanka Army, former Commander of the Security Forces – Headquarters East (SF HQ (E))	
Duleep Wickramanayake	Major General	former Commander of the Security Forces – Headquarters East (SF HQ (E))	
C. A. M. N. Silva	Major General	former Commander of the Security Forces – Headquarters East (SF HQ (E))	
Nanda Mallawaarachchi	Major General	former Chief of Staff of Sri Lankan Army	
Jagath Dias	Major General	former Commander 57th division of Sri Lankan Army, former Chief of Staff of Sri Lanka Army	
Kamal Gunaratne	Major General	former Commander 53rd division of Sri Lankan Army, Secretary to the Ministry of Defence	
Gratian Silva	Major General		
Prasanna De Silva	Major General	former Commander 56th division, Special Forces Regiment, and Army Commando Regiment of Sri Lankan Army	
Gotabaya Rajapaksa	Lieutenant Colonel		
A. P. N. C. De S. Vaas Gunawardene †	Second Lieutenant	first Sri Lankan commissioned officer to be killed in action in Sri Lankan Civil War	

=== Navy ===
Name	Rank	Notability	Reference(s)
Wasantha Karannagoda	Admiral of the Fleet	Commander of the Navy (2005–2009)	
Sarath Weerasekara	Rear Admiral	Chief of Staff of the Navy, first director general of the Civil Security Force	

=== Air force ===
Name	Rank	Notability	Reference(s)
R. A. U. P. Rajapaksa	Air Vice Marshal	Air Force Commander of the Sri Lanka Air Force, Sri Lanka Air Force	

== Police ==
Name	Notability	Reference(s)
Osmund de Silva	Inspector-General of Police (1955–1959)	
Mahinda Balasuriya	Inspector-General of Police (2009–2011)	
M. Walter F. Abeykoon	Inspector-General of Police (1951–1953)	
Sumith Liyanage	Deputy Inspector General of Police, 1960 national featherweight champion, 1960 Olympic Games competitor	

== Academics ==
Name	Notability	Reference(s)
K. D. Arulpragasam	First Vice Chancellor of Eastern University	
Charles Dahanayake	Author, Professor of Physics, Dean - Faculty of Science, University of Kelaniya	
Chandre Dharma-wardana	Scientist, Professor in Theoretical Physics Université de Montréal	
D. Shelton A. Gunaratne	Professor of Mass Communications Emeritus affiliated with Minnesota State University Moorhead	
Saman Halgamuge	Professor of Engineering and AI, University of Melbourne	
Sampath Amaratunge	Professor of Economics, Chairman of University Grants Commission (Sri Lanka)	
W. S. Karunaratne	Professor in Buddhist Philosophy and Comparative Religion at Peradeniya University; Dean of the Faculty of Arts; member of Board of Regents of University of Sri Lanka	
Wickremabahu Karunaratne	Lecturer of Electronics at Peradeniya University; Leader of Nava Samsamaja Party	
Chandratne Patuwathavithane	Former Professor of Engineering; Vice Chancellor of the University of Moratuwa	
Vicumpriya Perera	Professor of Mathematics, Kent State University	
Bogoda Premaratne	Author, former principal of Royal College, Colombo	
Sunanda Mahendra	Author, Professor of Mass Communication, University of Kelaniya	
Nimal Rajapakshe	Dean - Faculty of Applied Sciences Simon Fraser University, Canada; Vice-President (Research and International), Carleton University, Canada	
M. P. Ranaweera	Professor of Civil Engineering; Dean, Faculty of Engineering, University of Peradeniya	
V. K. Samaranayake	Professor of Computer Science; former dean of the Faculty of Science, University of Colombo	
Karu Esselle	Professor, School of Engineering, Macquarie University, Australia	
Suwanda H. J. Sugunasiri	Professor of Theology University of Toronto	
L. H. Sumanadasa	Aviator; engineer; Educator; former vice chancellor University of Ceylon; Founder of the University of Moratuwa	
Stanley Wijesundera	Former professor of chemistry; vice chancellor University of Colombo	
Sumedha Chandana Wirasinghe	Professor of civil engineering; founding dean (emeritus) Schulich School of Engineering, University of Calgary	
G. M. Heenilame	Founder of North Colombo Medical College	
J. B. Disanayake	Linguist, Head of the Department of Sinhala, Faculty of Arts, University of Colombo	
Don William Rajapatirana	3rd Governor of the Central Bank of Sri Lanka	
Warnasena Rasaputra	Economist, 7th Governor of the Central Bank of Sri Lanka	
Nandalal Weerasinghe	Economist, 17th Governor of the Central Bank of Sri Lanka	

== Medicine ==
Name	Notability	Reference(s)
Ravindra Fernando	Professor of Forensic Medicine, Faculty of Medicine, University of Colombo	
Harendra de Silva	Professor of Paediatrics, Faculty of Medicine, University of Kelaniya	
G. M. Heenilame	founder of North Colombo Medical College, University of Kelaniya	
Tissa Vitharana	Professor of Microbiology	
Anil Jasinghe	Director General of Health Services, Ministry of Health	

== Legal ==
Name	Notability	Reference(s)
Shiva Pasupati	Former Attorney General of Sri Lanka	
Yuwanjana Wijayatilake	Former Attorney General of Sri Lanka	
Ye Htoon	Burmese Lawyer, Entrepreneur	

== Corporate ==
Name	Notability	Reference(s)
Nalaka Godahewa	Chairman of Sri Lanka Tourism; former managing director of Sri Lanka Insurance Corporation	
Thilan Wijesinghe	Former Chief of Board of Investment (Sri Lanka); chief executive officer Forbes and Walker Ltd	

== Sports ==
Name	Notability	Reference(s)
Arjuna Ranatunga	International cricket player (1982–2000); captain (1988–2000); Member of Parliament (Colombo (2001–10), Kalutara (2010–15), Gampaha (2015–present))	
Marvan Atapattu	International cricket player (1990–2007)	
Dinesh Chandimal	International cricket player (2010–present); captain (2017-–present)	
Akalanka Ganegama	One Day International cricket player (2001–06)	
Anurudda Polonowita	One Day International cricket player (2001–06)	
Avishka Gunawardene	International cricket player (1998–2005)	
Chandika Hathurusingha	International cricket player (1991–1999)	
Dinuka Hettiarachchi	International cricket player (2001)	
Udara Jayasundera	International cricket player (2015)	
Thilina Kandamby	One Day International cricket player (2004–2011)	
Brendon Kuruppu	International cricket player (1987–1991)	
Muthumudalige Pushpakumara	One Day International cricket player (2009–10)	
Daya Rajasinghe Nadarajasingham	Olympic rifle shooter (1972, 1988)	
Dammika Ranatunga	International cricket player (1989)	
Nishantha Ranatunga	One Day International cricket player (1993)	
Sanjeeva Ranatunga	International cricket player (1994–98)	
Dulip Samaraweera	International cricket player (1993–95)	
Thilan Samaraweera	International cricket player (2001–13)	
Charith Senanayake	International cricket player (1991)	
Sachithra Senanayake	International cricket player (2013)	
Ajit de Silva	International cricket player (1982)	
Mahela Udawatte	International cricket player (2018)	
Dhansiri Weerasinghe	First-class cricket player (1958–1965)	
Sanjeewa Weerasinghe	International cricket player (1985)	
Mithra Wettimuny	International cricket player (1983)	
Sidath Wettimuny	International cricket player (1982–87)	
Sunil Wettimuny	One Day International cricket player (1975–79)	
Hemantha Wickramaratne	One Day International cricket player (1993)	
Sarath Wimalaratne	First-class cricket player (1965–68)	
Shammu Ashan	First-class cricket player (2016)	
Priya Munasinghe	Motor Racer; former Secretary of Sri Lanka Association of Sri Lanka	

== Engineers ==
Name	Notability	Reference(s)
B. D. Rampala	Former General Manager of Ceylon Railways	
L. H. Sumanadasa	Former Vice Chancellor of the University of Ceylon; founder of the University of Moratuwa	
R. G. de S. Wettimuny	Buddhist writer; chartered engineer (mechanical and civil)	
D. J. Wimalasurendra	Pioneer of hydro power in Sri Lanka	

== Media ==
Name	Notability	Reference(s)
Titus Thotawatte	former head of the children's programmes unit of Sri Lanka Rupavahini Corporation	
Nishantha Ranatunga	CEO of CSN TV	
Bandula Padmakumara	Sri Lankan journalist, writer, former Lake House chairman	
Premil Ratnayake	Journalist (Lake House); writer; diplomat; former First Secretary (Press and Information)	
Regi Siriwardena	Journalist, poet, writer, playwright	
Tarzie Vittachi	Journalist; former UNICEF Deputy Executive Director of External Relations	

== Arts ==
Name	Notability	Reference(s)
Premakeerthi De Alwis	Composer; narrator	
Tissa Devendra	Author	
Malaka Dewapriya	Video artist; short filmmaker	
K. A. W. Perera	Director, producer, Screenplay writer	
Premil Ratnayake	Author; journalist	
W. B. Makuloluwa	Author; director	
Lucky Dias	Actor	
Dayananda Gunawardena	Playwright; actor; lyricist; radio play producer	
Piyadasa Gunasekera	Film actor	
Nalaka Gunawardene	Journalist	
Bathiya Jaykody	Singer	
Kasun Kalhara	Music director, singer, composer	
Indrachapa Liyanage	Singer	
P. G. Punchihewa	Author; Civil Servant	
Sathish Perera	Singer	
Sunanda Mahendra	Author; critic	
D. B. Nihalsinghe	Film director; founding CEO / General Manager of the State Film Corporation pioneer of Sri Lankan television production	
G. B. Senanayake	Author	
Titus Thotawatte	Film director	
Meemana Premathilake	Poet, Journalist, Author	
C. G. Uragoda	Physician; author; folklorist; historian; conservationist	
Wijeratne Warakagoda	Actor	
Jagath Wickramasinghe	Singer	
Thusitha Laknath	Actor	
Jayatilleke De Silva	Author; Journalist	
Dudley Wanaguru	Actor	
Saumya Liyanage	Actor, Dean - Faculty of Graduate Studies University of the Visual and Performing Arts	
Asoka Ponnamperuma	Actor	
Sajitha Anthony	Film and TV actor	

== Religion ==
Name	Notability	Reference(s)
Balangoda Ananda Maitreya Thero	Writer, Buddhist Scholar	
Curuppumullage Jinarajadasa	Theosophist, Author, Buddhist Scholar	
