= G. M. Heenilame =

Sri Lankan physician

- Born: G. M. Heennilame; 16 November 1921; Pelmadulla, Ceylon
- Died: 12 January 2009 (aged 87); Colombo, Sri Lanka
- Education: University of Ceylon
- Alma mater: Ananda College
- Known for: Chairmen, North Colombo Medical College

Gankande Muhandiramge Heennilame (16 November 1921 – 12 January 2009) was a Sri Lankan physician. He is the founder and chairmen of the North Colombo Medical College, which was the first private medical school in Sri Lanka.

== Early life and education ==
Heennilame was born on 16 November 1921 in Gannegama, Pelmadulla. He received his primary and secondary education from Seevali Vidyalaya, Ratnapura and at Ananda College. In 1949, he graduated from the University of Ceylon with a MBBS.

== Medical career ==
He thereafter joined the Ceylon Medical Service, serving first as a house officer at the Lady Ridgeway Hospital for Children; district medical assistant (DMA) in hospitals in Dickoya, Maskeliya, Bogawantalawa, Pussellawa, Gampola and Lunawa; resident medical officer Victoria Memorial Eye Hospital and at Health Bandarawela. He was thereafter appointed Medical Officer in Dermatology, General Hospital, Colombo. In 1956, he took early retirement from state service.

Following his departure from the state service, he worked for two years at the Grandpass Nursing Home before starting his private practice at Dean’s Road. Having joined the Independent Medical Practitioners’ Association (IMPA) in 1956, he was appointed its Secretary holding the post for 19 years and later served as its Vice President. He was one of the founders of the College of General Practitioners of Sri Lanka (CGPSL), serving for six years as its Secretary and thereafter as its third President.

He initiated the CGPSL's initiative to establish a private medical school in Sri Lanka in the late 1970s and in 1981 the North Colombo Medical College (NCMC) was established with Heennilame was Chairman of the Board of Governors and Board of Management of the NCMC. He led NCMC under many difficulties, awarding its own MBBS degrees in 1988. Following personal treats and a bomb attack by the Janatha Vimukthi Peramuna, he had to leave the country briefly and in 1989, NCMC was nationalized and turned into the Faculty of Medicine of University of Kelaniya under Prof Carlo Fonseka.

Thereafter, Heennilame served as Chairman of the Board of Study in Family Medicine of the Postgraduate Institute of Medicine where he established the Diploma in Family (DFM) program. He was a Member of the University Grants Commission, Vice President of the Sri Lanka Medical Association and a Member of the Health Council.

== Family ==
His wife Beryl and he had three sons, Upali a surgeon, Amal a physician and Anura who served in the Sri Lanka Air Force.
