= Suranimala Rajapaksha =

Sri Lankan politician

The Honourable Suranimala Rajapaksha MP
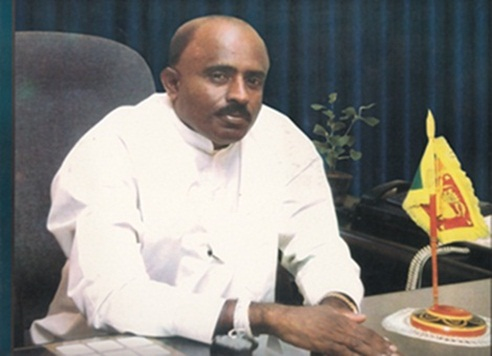

Special Envoy to the Prime Minister
- In office 7 October 2015 – 14 March 2016
- Prime Minister: Ranil Wickremesinghe

Coordinating Secretary to the Prime Minister
- In office 27 January 2015 – 18 August 2015
- Prime Minister: Ranil Wickremesinghe

Minister of School Education
- In office 2001–2004
- President: Chandrika Kumaratunga
- Prime Minister: Ranil Wickremesinghe

Member of Parliament for Gampaha District
- In office 1994–2004

Member of Western Provincial Council
- In office 1988–1994

Minister of Education, Sports, Youth Affairs, Women Affairs and Cultural Affairs of the Western Provincial Council
- In office 1988–1993
- President: Ranasinghe Premadasa
- Prime Minister: D.B. Wijetunga
- Governor: Suppiah Sharvananda

Executive Member of Gampaha District Development Council
- In office 1982–1988

Private Secretary to the Minister of Education, Youth Affairs and Employment
- In office 1977–1988
- Minister: Ranil Wickremesinghe

Executive Director of National Youth Service Council
- In office 1982–1988

Personal details
- Born: 5 January 1949
- Died: 14 March 2016 (aged 67) Colombo
- Party: United National Party
- Spouse: Chandani Rajapaksha
- Children: Sanjeewani Rajapaksha; Kanishka Rajapaksha
- Parent(s): Saranelis Rajapaksha (father); D.P.Rajapaksha Haminea (mother)
- Education: Ananda College
- Occupation: Politician

Rajapakse Mohottige Don Suranimala Rajapaksha (Sinhala:සුරනිමල රාජපක්ෂ) (5 January 1949 – 14 March 2016) was a Sri Lankan politician. Rajapaksha was first elected to the Parliament of Sri Lanka in 1994 and he was the Minister of School Education in the Democratic Socialist Republic of Sri Lanka from 2001 to 2004. He was a member of the United National Party (UNP) and a member of the UNP Working Committee. He was also appointed as the Coordinating secretary to the prime minister Ranil Wickremesinghe in 2015. At the time of his death he acted as the special envoy (representative) to the Prime Minister. His younger son Kanishka Rajapaksha was also appointed as the Coordinating Assistant to the Prime Minister after the death of Rajapaksha. Kanishka is an attorney at law.

== Early life ==
He was born to Saranelis Rajapaksha and D.P. Rajapaksha Hamine. His father was a well-respected landowner in the village of Samanabeddha, Thitthapatthara, in Gampaha District. He was the youngest son in a family of three. In 1983, he married Chandani Jayakodi.

== Education ==
Rajapaksha completed his primary education at Mayadunna Maha Vidyalaya and Rajasingha Maha Vidyalaya. He later entered Ananda College at Colombo to complete his secondary education.

== Political career ==
=== Member of Youth League ===
In 1973, he was appointed a working committee member in the Youth League of the UNP. Ranil Wickremesinghe was the treasurer of the Youth League.

=== Minister of Provincial Council ===
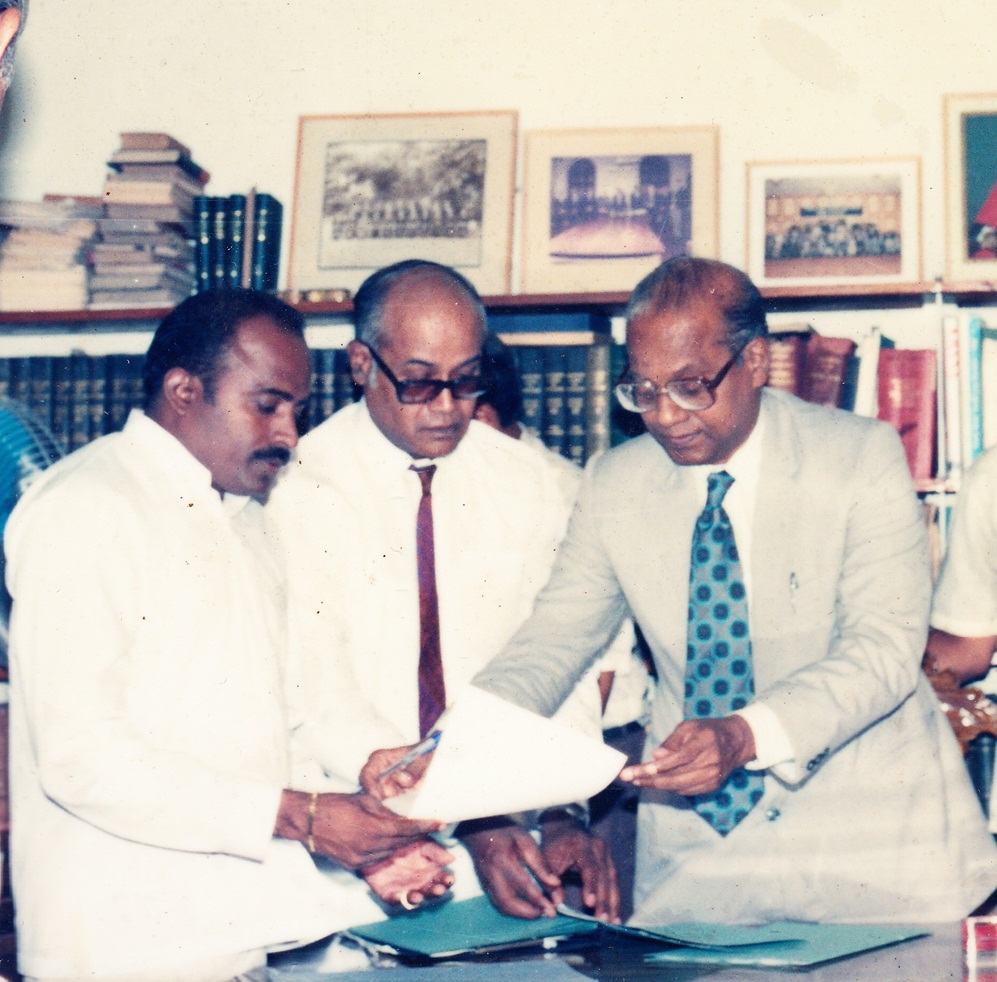
Suranimala Rajapaksha Sworn-in as a Provincial Council Minister in front of Governor of Western Province Suppiah Sharvananda

With the 13th amendment to the constitution in 1988, the government established Provincial Councils for each province. The First Provincial Council election was held in 1988, and Rajapaksha was elected as a member of the Provincial Council representing the Gampaha district.

=== Member of Parliament ===
In the 1994 general election, UNP lost to Chandrika Bandaranaike Kumaratunga's PA and she was appointed as the Prime Minister and soon after elected as the 5th executive President of the country. However, in 1994, Rajapaksha was elected as a member of parliament (MP) of the opposition for the very first time at the general election.

=== Minister of School Education ===
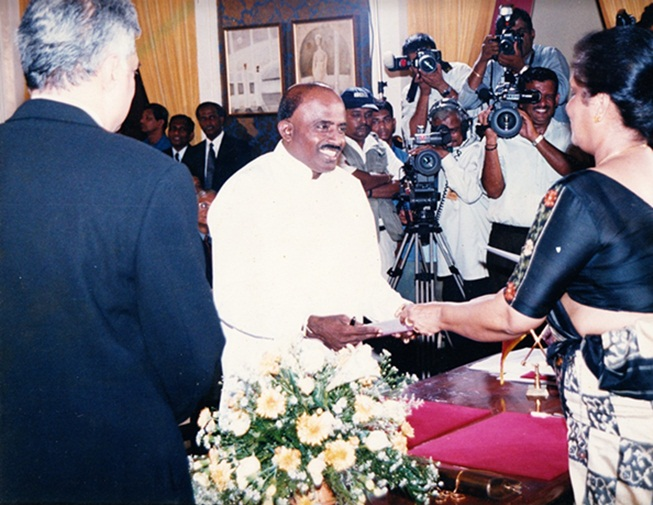
Suranimala Rajapaksha Sworn-in as the Minister of School Education in front of President Chandrika Kumaratunga and Prime Minister Ranil Wickremesinghe

In 2001 UNP called for a general election after PA lost their vote of confidence in the Parliament. After 7 years, UNP defeated the PA at the 2001 general election and Ranil Wickremesinghe was appointed as the PM of Socialist Republic of Sri Lanka. Rajapaksha was re-elected to the Parliament in that election and he was appointed as the Minister of School Education in 2001.

=== Political controversy ===
In 2003, Rajapaksha who was a non-cabinet Education Minister would frequently undermine his senior Cabinet Minister Karunasena Kodituwakku resulting in a rift within the UNP. According to prominent Sri Lankan academic and political analyst Prof. Rajiva Wijesinha, Suranimala Rajapaksa, as Project Ministers of Education was exercising equal powers with Karunasena Kodituwakku who was in theory his superior leading to the party facing an internal conflict.

=== Domestic Airlines delay controversy ===
In March 2003, a domestic airline was delayed by two hours in Jaffna because non-cabinet minister for educational services, Suranimala Rajapakse, was lunching with a local MP. The British Broadcasting Corporation correspondent Frances Harrison reported that Elderly and sick passengers were loaded on to the aircraft with no air conditioning or refreshments and kept waiting while the minister then drank tea with the Jaffna security force commander at the airport.

=== Misappropriation of Public Property ===
Rajapaksha faced a humiliating loss of his Parliamentary seat during the 2004 General Elections. In 2007, the Attorney General's Department (Sri Lanka) initiated action against Rajapaksha for defaulting the payment of installments for the luxury vehicles obtained under the duty free facility provided for parliamentarians.The Attorney General's Department concluded that the Minister was being charged for misappropriation of Public Property, in which the accused is not entitled to appeal for bail.

Due to the controversy related to allegations of corruption surrounding Suranimala Rajapaksha, the UNP leadership did not nominate him to contest the 2010 general elections.

=== Arrest following political violence ===
Suranimala Rajapaksha along with several other UNP politicians were arrested for unleashing political violence on a protest march which resulted in several protesters being injured on October 5, 2013.

Matara Chief Magistrate and Additional District Judge Sarath Sisira Kumara later released Rajapaksha and his associates on a Rs. 100,000 personal bail each.

=== Coordinating Secretary to the Prime Minister ===
The common candidate of the joint opposition, Maithreepala Sirisena who secured a comprehensive victory on 8 January 2015 presidential election was sworn in as the 7th executive president of the Democratic Socialist Republic of Sri Lanka. Soon after, opposition leader Ranil Wickremesinghe was sworn in as the new Prime Minister in the presence of the president. Wickremesinghe later appointed him as the coordinating secretary to the Prime Minister on 27 January 2015.

== Positions held at the end ==
- Working Committee member of the United National Party
- Secretary, Ex-Parliamentarian Group
- Special envoy to the prime minister Ranil Wickremesinghe

== Death ==
Rajapaksha died in the early hours of 14 March 2016 in Colombo, at the age of 67, he had been receiving treatment at a private hospital. He served as the special envoy to Ranil Wickremesinghe, the prime minister of Sri Lanka, for just over a year, at the time of his death.

== See also ==
- List of Ananda College alumni
