= Leelawathi Dharmaratne =

Sri Lankan academic and educator (born 1927)

Vithanage Leelawathi Aslin Dharmaratne also simply better known as Leelawathi Dharmaratne (born 30 November 1927) is a Sri Lankan academic, notary and educator.

== Biography ==
Leelawathi was born on 30 November 1927 in the rural village of Millawa in Waharana. She obtained her primary and secondary education at the Millawa Girls' College. She successfully completed her General Certificate Examination in both English and Sinhala medium curriculums.

== Career ==
She reportedly worked as a schoolteacher teaching the language of English to students in 1955. She also served in as a notary public in a respectable capacity. She is thought to be the first official notary in Sri Lanka, as she underwent the notary examinations which she successfully completed in 1962. She completed both Tripitaka Dhamma and Pali language tests moderated by University of Sri Jayewardenepura at the age of 94. In September 2023, she obtained her Master of Arts degree in Buddhist studies at the Postgraduate Institute of Pali and Buddhist Studies at University of Kelaniya.

In August 2024, she obtained her postgraduate degree at the age of 97, defying the odds and stereotypes surrounding the age limit for educational advancement. She obtained her postgraduate degree in the field of Buddhist Studies during the 143rd graduation ceremony of the University of Kelaniya, which was held on 21 August 2024.
