= Faculty of Medicine, University of Kelaniya =

Coordinates: 7°1′51″N 79°55′0″E

- Type: Public
- Established: 1991
- Chancellor: Ven. Welamitiyawe Dharmakirthi Sri Kusala Dhamma Thero
- Vice-Chancellor: Prof. Nilanthi de Silva
- Dean: Professor Madawa Chandrathilake
- Location: Ragama, Sri Lanka
- Campus: Urban
- Colours: Maroon and yellow
- Website: Official website

The Faculty of Medicine of the University of Kelaniya located in Ragama, is one of eleven state medical schools in Sri Lanka. It is on a 35-acre (140,000 m^{2}) campus at Ragama, and the faculty began classes with the admission of 120 students in September 1991. Before that it was called the North Colombo Medical College (NCMC).

== Overview ==
The faculty has 1120 MBBS undergraduate students, 400 Speech and Hearing Sciences students and 73 Occupational Therapy students on its roll. This includes some foreign students, mainly from other South Asian countries, who have been admitted on a self-financing basis. The faculty also welcomes students for elective appointments and many students from medical schools in Europe, United States and Australia have spent their elective periods here. The faculty has a full range of academic departments consisting of about 145 academic staff members, including 23 professors. They are complemented by over 60 visiting staff, including consultants who are based in the affiliated teaching hospitals and other universities. In keeping with the need to expand and improve allied health services in the country the faculty established the Disability Studies Unit in 1993 and the Centre for Tropical Medicine and International Health, which conducts courses for primary health care workers, in 1999. The Molecular Medicine Unit was established in 2003 with the aims of improving molecular diagnostic facilities for infectious diseases and providing DNA fingerprinting. In 2007 the Disability Studies Unit was upgraded to the Department of Disability Studies, the only one of its kind in the South Asian region.

The faculty provides an undergraduate teaching curriculum for the MBBS degree based on two years of basic sciences, followed by the clinical science training sessions held at the North Colombo (Teaching) General Hospital, Ragama. The curriculum is organized around weekly tutorials at specific tutorial rooms supported by lectures, problem based learning sessions, small group discussions and practical classes.

The faculty also provides hostel facilities for most of its students. It also has an open air theatre, a sports ground, a multipurpose court and gymnasium. A cultural center was opened in January 2009 and programmes in music, dance, art and photography are conducted.

== Location ==
The Faculty of Medicine of the University of Kelaniya is situated on a spacious 35-acre campus at the corner of Thalagolla Road, Ragama. Surrounded with trees and nature, the faculty provides the students with a peaceful environment. The faculty also has a well maintained botanical garden with rare species of plants and a lot of animals and birds.

== History ==
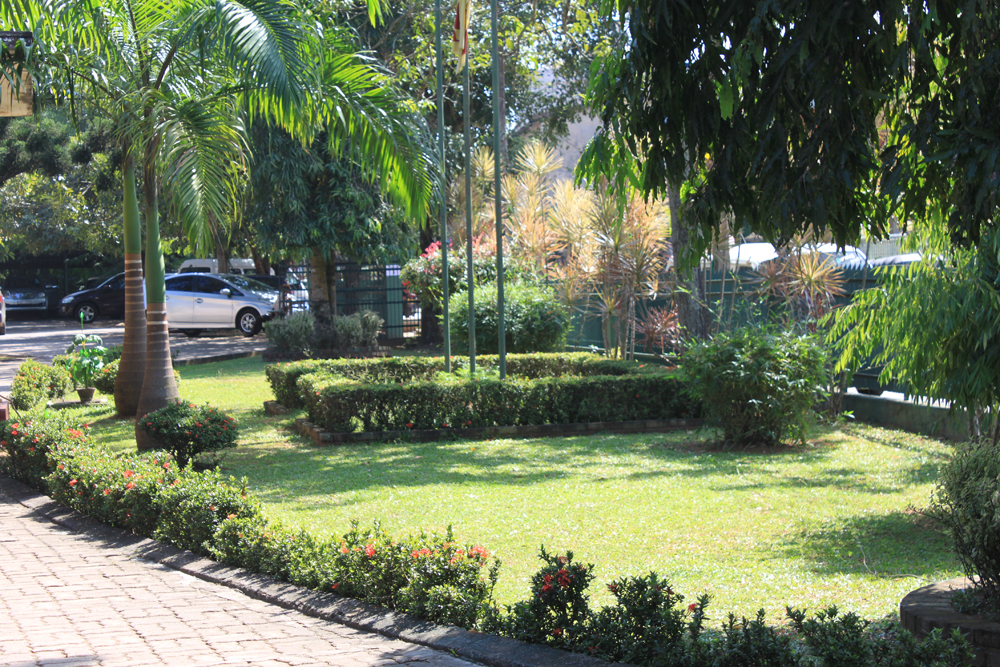
Garden, Faculty of Medicine, University of Kelaniya

The Faculty of Medicine of the University of Kelaniya in Ragama, was established in 1991 and has advanced to be one of the leading medical faculties in Sri Lanka. Its inception was brought about by the affiliation of The North Colombo Medical College to the University of Kelaniya as the Faculty of Medicine by an act of parliament on the 2nd of September in 1991. Professor Carlo Fonseka was the founder dean of the faculty. At the inception, there were 120 students and that number has increased to 1600 students at present. Since then it is known as the Faculty of Medicine, Ragama which has had 7 deans up to now. Professor Carlo Fonseka, the founder dean of the faculty, Professor Janaka de Silva, Professor Rajitha Wickramasinghe, Professor Nilanthi de Silva, Professor Prasantha Wijesinghe, Professor Janaki Hewavisenthi & Professor Madawa Chandrathilake, the present dean of the faculty.

== Buildings and sites ==
The faculty of medicine of the University of Kelaniya is situated on a 35-acre campus at Ragama city. The North Colombo Teaching hospital is the main teaching hospital, and is situated next to the campus premises. University clinical departments have wards in the hospital.

The faculty has an open-air theatre, a multi-purpose court and a gymnasium. A cultural centre was opened in January 2009.

The faculty comprises sixteen academic departments, a medical education centre, a centre for tropical medicine and international health, a disability studies unit and a molecular medicine Unit. A liver transplantation unit is aligned to the faculty. A computer centre is also established within the faculty.

There are two main lecture halls which are used for teaching purposes, and two main examination halls. Students are provided with a separate study area in the pre-clinical building and the libraries.

There are hostels for both male and female students. There are two canteens and a milk bar in the faculty premises. A common room is in the same area as the main canteen.

== Office of the Dean ==
Administrative and financial functions pertaining to the medical faculty as whole are handled by this office, which is in two sections: the Senior Assistant Registar's office (SAR's office) and the Senior Assistant Bursa's office (SAB's office).

The SAR's office handles the administration and maintenance of buildings and services of the faculty. Obtaining permission for student activities, arranging time tables and schedules, registering students for examinations, arranging transport for students' clinical appointments, liaising with the student welfare and academic branches of the University of Kelaniya, general supervision and monitoring of security personnel and cleaning services, procurement of services, repair and maintenance of equipment and all maintenance activities of the faculty, facilitating disciplinary procedures, monitoring of attendance of non-academic staff and leave control, maintenance of records of the properties of the faculty, handling audit queries, and implementation of decisions of the faculty board and the dean are done by the SAR's office.

The SAB's office deals with all the financial matters of the faculty. All payments of student scholarships and bursaries are made through this office. All goods are procured and payments of the faculty are made through this office.

== Departments and units ==
The Faculty of Medicine of the University of Kelaniya comprises sixteen academic departments and several other centers and units.

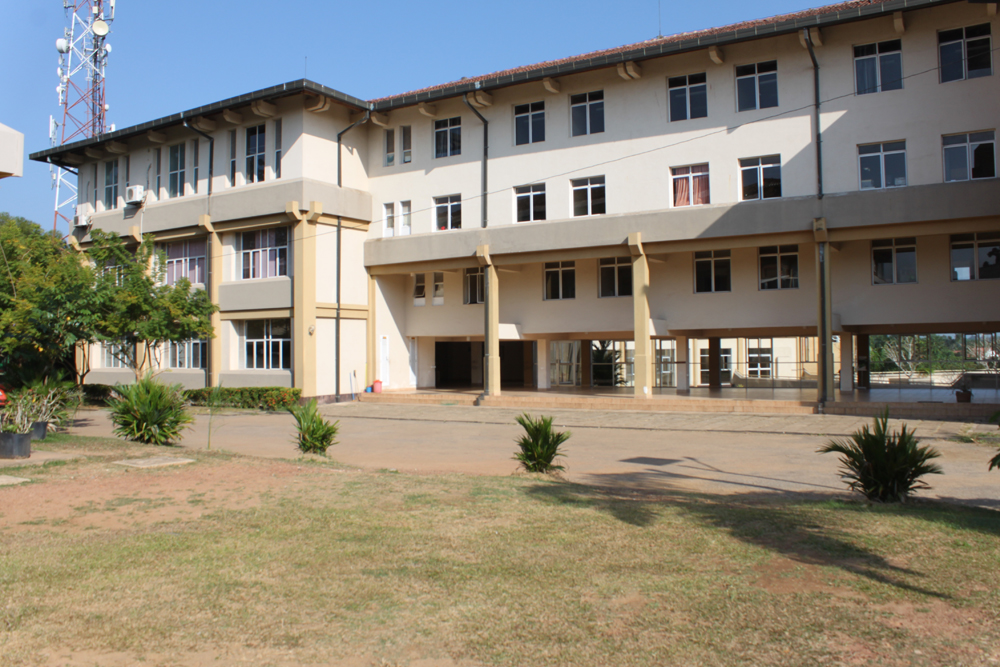
Pre Clinical Building, Faculty of Medicine, University of Kelaniya

- Department of Anatomy
- Department of Biochemistry & Clinical Chemistry
- Department of Disability Studies
- Department of Family Medicine
- Department of Forensic Medicine
- Department of Medical Microbiology
- Department of Medicine
- Department of Obstetrics and Gynaecology
- Department of Paediatrics
- Department of Parasitology
- Department of Pathology
- Department of Pharmacology
- Department of Physiology
- Department of Psychiatry
- Department of Public Health
- Department of Surgery

== Centers and units ==
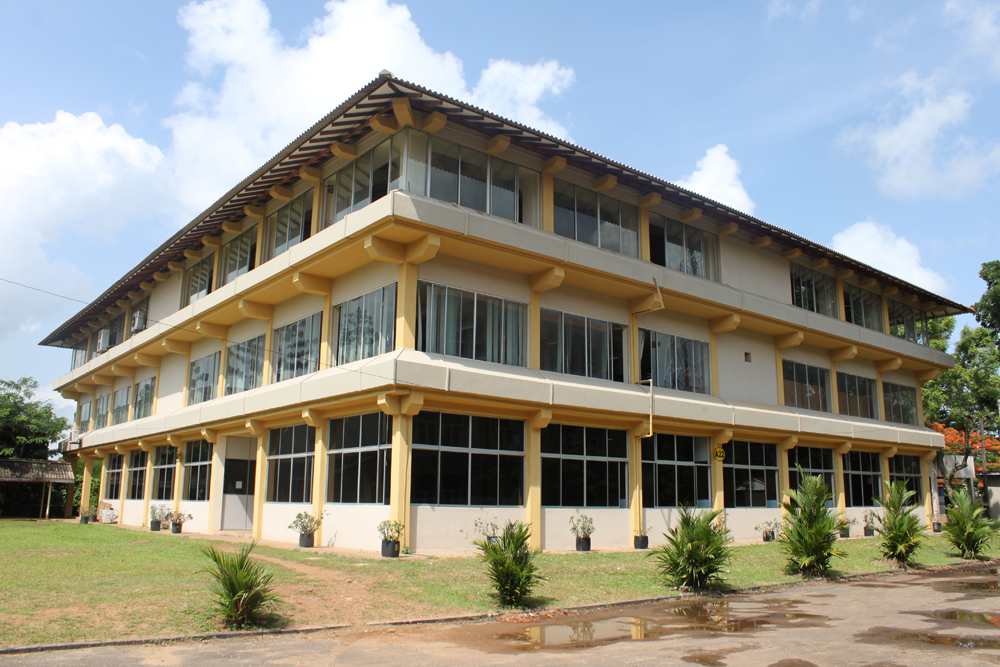
Library and Computer Center, Faculty of Medicine, University of Kelaniya

- Centre for Tropical Medicine and International Health
- Clinical Trial Unit
- Computer Centre
- English Language Unit
- Gastroenterology Research Laboratory
- Hepato-Pancreatico-Billiary(HPB) and Liver Transplant (LT) unit
- Medical Education Centre
- Medical Library
- Molecular Medicine Unit
- Thalassaemia Unit

== Academic Programmes ==
- Undergraduate Programmes
- Postgraduate Programmes
- External degree programmes

== Clinical Service ==
- Gastroenterology Research Laboratory
- Clinical Genetics
- Lung Function Laboratory
- HPB & Liver Transplant

== Clubs and associations ==
- The Medical Faculty Student Union
- The Faculty Photographic Society
- The Sports Association
- The Buddhist Students' Association
- The Catholic Students' Movement
- The Green Society

== Facilities at the hostels ==
Boys' hostels are in five buildings, three of which are now in use, while two are being repaired. The hostels have many facilities to accommodate the needs of students. There are common rooms equipped with TVs, study areas, a canteen, parking lots, a playground and a basketball court.

A hostel committee has been formed to bring forth the troubles of hostel students. There is a sub warden to look after the students. Cleaning staff maintain the bathrooms. Maintenance of electric equipment and other equipment is done by faculty maintenance staff.

Students sign a housing contract as they enter the hostels, and pay Rs.1100 per year.

Hostel slots normally open up during May. The criteria for selecting students for hostel facilities are based on the seniority of the students and the financial need and distance from home.

Fire alarms are now being installed in the hostels.

The girls' hostels have similar facilities. There are common rooms. A study area is being built presently. There is also a small canteen.

The faculty hostels will be able to house the majority of the student population after the repairs are completed.

== See also ==
- University of Kelaniya
