= L. H. Sumanadasa =

LH Sumanadasa
- Born: 3 December 1910; Ambalangoda, Sri Lanka
- Died: 24 May 1986 (aged 75); Sri Lanka
- Education: Ananda College, University of Ceylon, Imperial College London
- Occupations: Engineer, Aeronautical Engineer, Aviator. Vice Chancellor and Founder of University of Moratuwa

Lokusatu Heva Sumanadasa, was a pilot, engineer, educator, Vice Chancellor of the University of Ceylon and founder of the University of Moratuwa.

== Education ==
Sumanadasa was born on 3 December 1910 in Ceylon (now Sri Lanka) at Ambalangoda. He was educated at Dharmasoka College, Ambalangoda and Ananda College, Colombo at the time when Patrick de Silva Kularatne was its principal. He completed his B.Sc. degree in physics at Ceylon University College and was awarded the Ceylon Government Scholarship to study aeronautical engineering at Imperial College, London in 1932 Graduating from BSc and DIC (postgraduate Diploma of Imperial College).

== Aviation ==
He learnt to fly with the London Aeroplane Club at Hatfield with Geoffrey de Havilland, Jr. as his instructor and made his first solo in and passed his A licence in 1934 (flying a DH.60G Gipsy Moth with a Gipsy II 120 hp engine) obtaining a private pilot's licence. He was a student member and later a full member of the Royal Aeronautical Society.

After graduating (the first person from Sri Lanka to qualify in aeronautical engineering) he was hired by Handley Page Ltd where he worked as a junior technical assistant and later as a senior technical assistant in the design office. When war broke out, he volunteered his services to the Royal Air Force and was a member of the RAF Volunteer reserve. However, his technical and knowledge of aeronautical design at Handley Page made it impossible for him to be deployed on active service although his Ceylonese compatriots in the RAFVR, Rohan Amerasekera (later to command Sri Lankas Airforce), Mickey Dias (later First Law Fellow, Director of Studies and Professor of Jurisprudence at Magdalene College, Cambridge), Rex de Silva, Pilot Officer Ananda Kularatne (son of Sumanadasa's school principal) and Dougald Abayasekera (former cricket captain and head prefect of S. Thomas' College, Mt Lavinia) saw active service. Sumanadasa, his wife and daughter returned to Sri Lanka in October 1942. His daughter later described the voyage through U Boat infested waters and storms, during which all ships but theirs was lost.

== Government Service ==
Despite his skills and experience in aeronautical engineering, the government of Ceylon deployed him to work in a senior role for the Ceylon Plywood Corporation in Gintota and later as government engineer for the southern coastal city of Galle.

=== Education and University ===
Sumanadasa worked from 1958 with the Ministry of Education to establish the Institute of Practical Technology at Katubedde, Moratuwa, which opened in 1960. Sumanadasa was founder principal and was later Head of Civil Engineering at the Ceylon Technical College (CTC). In 1966 Sumanadasa became the founder director of the Ceylon College of Technology (CCT) which in 1972 became the University of Sri Lanka, Katubedde Campus with Sumanadasa as its first president. Sumanadasa was appointed Vice Chancellor of the University of Sri Lanka and retired in 1975. The Katubedda campus was awarded independent university status as the University of Moratuwa in 1978.

== Honours and awards ==
The Sumanadasa building, named in his honour and built in 1973, remains in use and is one of the largest on the University of Moratuwa site. The university awarded him an honorary doctorate in 1980.
