= Sathish Perera =

Sri Lankan singer (1969–2012)

- සතිෂ් පෙරේරා
- Born: Thotagamage Sathish Perera; 29 May 1969
- Died: 23 April 2012 (aged 42); Colombo, Sri Lanka
- Education: Ananda College
- Occupations: Singer; songwriter; musician
- Spouse: Dinesha Perera
- Children: 1
- Parents: Shelton Perera (father); Kumari Shashi Perera (mother)
- Relatives: Anuradha Perera (sister)
- Musical career
- Genres: Pop; soul; rhythm and blues; Indian classical music
- Instrument: Vocals
- Years active: 1989–2011
- Labels: Nilwala; Ransilu; Evoke

Thotagamage Sathish Perera (Sinhala: සතිෂ් පෙරේරා; 29 May 1969 – 23 April 2012) was a Sri Lankan singer, composer and songwriter. He was the son of popular singer, the late Shelton Perera.

== Early life ==
Sathish Perera was born on 29 May 1969, to Shelton Perera and Kumari Shashi Perera. He has two brothers, Sanjaya and Subash, and two sisters, Anuradha and Anupama. Younger sister, Anuradha Perera is also a popular singer. He completed his education at Ananda College.

He was married to Dinesha Perera and they had one son, Akshitha, who was 9 months old at the time of Perera's death.

== Career ==
Although he hails from a musical family, Perera did not enter the music industry until his father died suddenly at age 49 in 1989. He started a singing career to continue his father's legacy. He released a remixed version of his father's most popular songs, Egodaha Yanno and Awasan Liyumai in 1991. With two songs, he gained popularity and appeared in outdoor musical shows.

Perera released two successful music albums, Pem Hasun and Egodaha Yanno. His hits include both his father's and his own creations, such as "Awasan Liyumai", "Sundarai Oba", "Kadulu Walin Pem Hasuna", "Mihirathi Wasantha Kale", "Kandalame Wewa Balanna", "Adareta Haduwak Tharam" and "Maha Muhudu Wimane".

Although his father was an award-winning playback singer for many popular films, Perera was not successful in playback singing. Sathish Perera along with Ranil Mallawarachchi and Priyankara Perera staged a musical show titled Milton, Milton and Shelton to pay tribute to their late fathers, Milton Perera, Milton Mallawarachchi and Shelton Perera, respectively.

== Death ==
Perera was diagnosed with leukemia one year and 6 months before his death. According to his mother and wife, initially, boils appeared on the upper part of one his legs. Doctors diagnosed his disease as ‘leukemia’. Perera believed it could not be leukemia, although he was admitted to the hospital for treatment. In the hospital, boils emerged on his entire body. During early April 2012, the illness spread to his lungs, causing breathing difficulties. He was admitted to the Intensive Care Unit of the Oasis hospital.

Inside ICU, he spoke with family members. On the early morning of 23 April 2012, Perera died at the Oasis hospital at the age of 42.

Sathish Perera's remains were first brought to his residence at Thalawathugoda and then to the Art Gallery at Borella, for his fans and public to pay their last respects before his cremation at Borella Cemetery. The funeral was held on 25 April 2012 at 4pm.

== Legacy ==
On 29 May 2014, a blood donation campaign was held with the participation of popular artists at Panchikawatta Abhayasingarama Viharaya to commemorate the 44th birthday of Sathish Perera. A special bodhi pooja and 1000 oil lamps were lit on the same day at 7 pm.
