= Sampath Amaratunge =

Sri Lankan academic and administrator (born 1964)

Sr. Prof Sampath Amaratunge
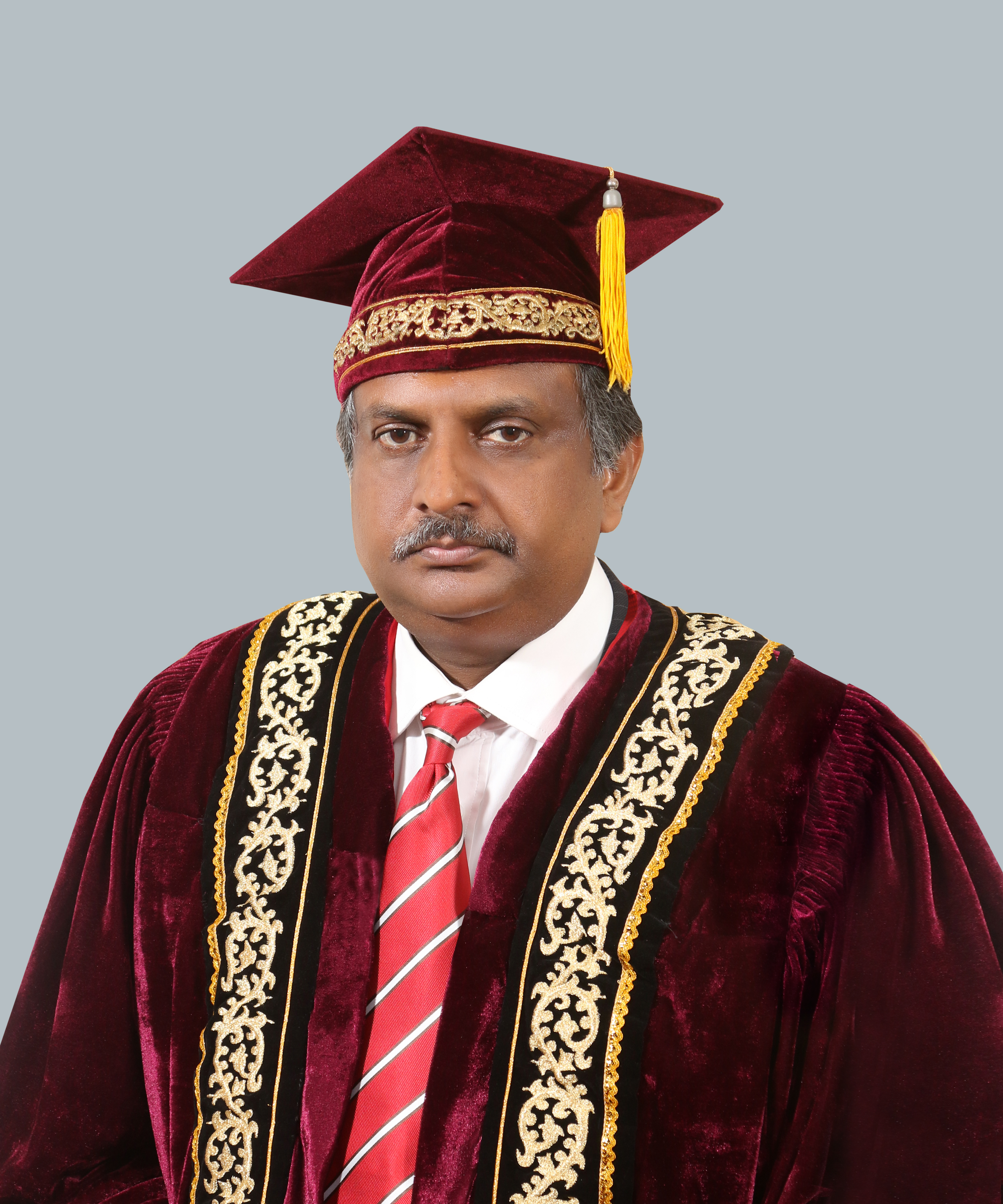

Chairman of the University Grants Commission
- Incumbent
- Assumed office 2020
- Preceded by: Mohan De Silva

Vice-Chancellor, University of Sri Jayewardenepura
- In office 2014–2020
- Preceded by: N. L. A. Karunaratne

Personal details
- Born: Sampath Priyantha Perera Amaratunge; 1 November 1964 (age 61) Battaramulla, Sri Lanka
- Spouse: Sunethrani
- Children: 1
- Education: Ananda College; University of Sri Jayewardenepura; Saga University; Kagoshima University
- Occupation: Academic, administrator
- Known for: Rural economics
- Awards: Order of the Rising Sun (旭日章, Kyokujitsu-shō)- Gold Rays with Neck Ribbon by the Government of Japan
- Website: www.sjp.ac.lk/about/vc/professor-sampath-amaratunge/

Sampath Amaratunge (born 1 November 1964) is the chairman of the University Grants Commission, Sri Lanka. He was appointed by the president on 2 January 2020, and assumed the role the following day. Amaratunge was previously the vice-chancellor at the University of Sri Jayewardenepura, Sri Lanka, and the chairman of the Committee of Vice-Chancellors and Directors (CVCD). He was elected as a member of the Association of Commonwealth Universities United Kingdom as a member representing constituency II.

== Early life and career ==
Sampath Amaratunge was born on 1 November 1964 in Battaramulla, Sri Lanka, to Priyadarshani Atthanayake and Sarath Chandrasiri Perera Ameratunge. He enrolled at Ananda College Colombo in 1970, and was admitted to pursue a bachelor's degree in economics at the University of Sri Jayewardenepura in 1990, where he also started lecturing. In 1994 he was able to obtain his master's degree in economics from the University of Colombo. He was later awarded the Monbusho (present-day Monbukagakusho) scholarship from Japan, which allowed him to join Saga University, where he completed his MSc. in rural economics in 2000. He completed his PhD in rural economics at Kagoshima University, Japan, in 2003. Upon returning to Sri Lanka, he resumed duties at the University of Sri Jayewardenepura. He was then made the Head of the Department of Business Economics, Faculty of Management Studies and Commerce, which he created. He became the dean of the Faculty of Management Studies and Commerce at the University of Sri Jayewardenepura in 2008. In 2009 he became a professor of business economics.

=== Dean ===
Amaratunge was appointed dean of the Faculty of Management Studies and Commerce, the University of Sri Jayewardenepura, in 2008. He was responsible for many changes that took place, among which were the establishment of departments, centres and programmes, and units. He founded the Department of Entrepreneurship, computer resource centre, a PhD programme, the Business Communication Unit, and established a legal unit linking management studies with law during his tenure as the Dean.

Amaratunge started the faculty journal Management Review and was made the "change agent" in 1993 of International Conference on Business Management (ICBM). He was also responsible for the introduction of the faculty symposium, which is held twice a year in the faculty, and introduced a Faculty Development Fund to develop the resources, equipment and infrastructure of the university.

He continued his position as dean of the faculty until November 2014, when he became the vice-chancellor of the university.

=== Vice-chancellor ===
Amaratunge is currently the twice-appointed vice-chancellor of the University of Sri Jayewardenepura. He first assumed the position in November 2014 when he was appointed by Mahinda Rajapaksa. In November 2017 he was re-appointed as vice-chancellor to serve a second term by Maithripala Sirisena. During his first term he formulated two new faculties for the University of Sri Jayewardenepura: the Faculty of Engineering and the Faculty of Technology. In his second term he founded the Faculty of Allied Health Sciences.

He introduced a number of new departments including: Department of Criminology and Criminal Justice, Department of Sociology, Department of Anthropology, Department of English Language Teaching, Department of Philosophy and Psychology, Department of Sports Science, Department of Allied Health Science, and the Department of Polymer Science.

He reorganised the Research and Publication Committee of the university to the level of a council with twenty five research centres.

In 2018, Amaratunge founded the Invention Innovation and Venture Creation Council (IIVCC) at the University of Sri Jayewardenepura to bridge the link between the university and the industry. At present the IIVCC has 50 start-ups registered and over 15 patent holders. The IIVCC operates as a council where students and university staff work collaboratively to develop new inventions and innovations. In early 2019 an exhibition, Innovate 2019, was held to showcase the inventions, innovations, and ventures.

Amaratunge signed more than 60 MoU's collaborating with many locally and internationally acclaimed institutes. The hostel occupancy of the university has been increased by over 50% and several infrastructural developments have been made.

=== CVCD Chairman ===
Amaratunge was appointed chairman of the Committee of Vice-Chancellors and Directors for 2019.

=== Representative ACU of constituency II ===
He was elected as a member representing constituency II of the Association of Commonwealth Universities (ACU) in 2019, which consists of Bangladesh, India, Malaysia, Pakistan, and Sri Lanka.

== Contributions to the higher education system ==
Amaratunge was the youngest member to be made a Commission Member of the University Grants Commission, a local governing body of the higher education system in Sri Lanka. He was appointed to this position by Mahinda Rajapaksa in 2010.

He was also the chairman of Federation of University Teachers' Associations (FUTA) and the University Teacher's Association, University of Sri Jayewardenepura (UTA/SJP), from 2009 to 2012. As a result of his leadership academics received an increment of 36.25% by the Commission circular No. 975 dated 13.01.2012 on their salaries after 17 years with minimum disruption to academic procedures in universities. During his time as the head of FUTA, Amaratunge received death threats in response to measures taken to obtain said increment.

== Sports ==
Amaratunge continued playing sports as an undergraduate, and he founded the university's first cricket team and was repeatedly awarded the best sportsman award at the university's Colours Night.

Upon joining the academia, he contributed to developing the sports section of the University of Sri Jayewardenepura and the sports of all state universities in the country. During his term (2004–2008) as the president of the Sports Advisory Board of the University of Sri Jayewardenepura, he reconstructed the university swimming pool, which is one of the largest in the country with a donation from Mahinda Rajapaksa.

Amaratunge was appointed president of the Sri Lanka University Sports Association (SLUSA) in 2008. In his term of one year he organized a mini-Olympic Games event at the University of Sri Jayewardenepura.
