= Priya Munasinghe =

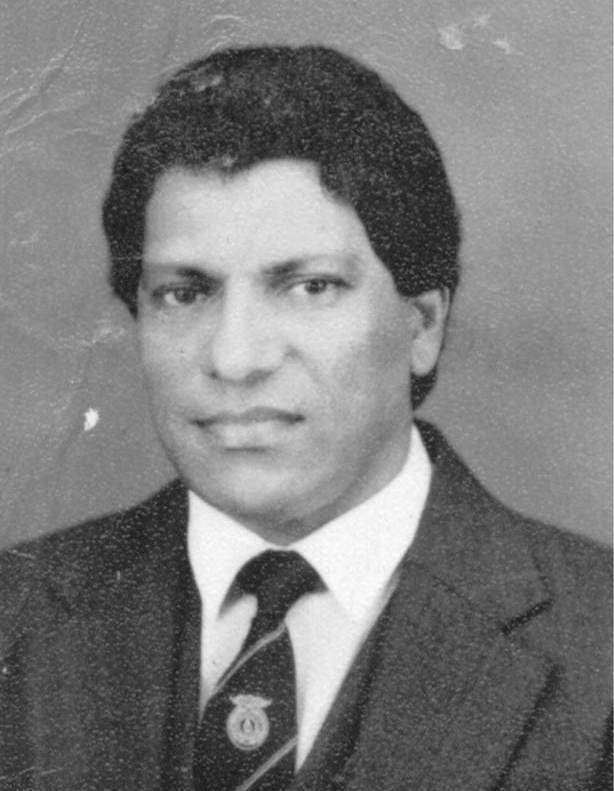
- Priya Munasinghe
- Born: 28 September 1941; Colombo
- Died: 29 November 2001 (aged 60); Colombo
- Education: Ananda College Colombo
- Occupation: Businessman
- Known for: Motor Racing Champion of Sri Lanka and India
- Title: Secretary of Sri Lanka Association of Motor Sports (SLAMS)

Priya Munasinghe was a Sri Lankan born Motor Racing champion, who dominated the regional Motor Sports scene of Sri Lanka, India and Malaysia from mid 1960s to 1977.

== Early childhood ==
Priya Munasinghe was educated at Ananda College Colombo. Priya excelled in cricket and long distance running (Athletics) at Ananda College. He held the public school 110 metre hurdles record for nine years.

== Other activities ==
Priya Munasinghe functioned as the Secretary of Sri Lanka Association of Motor Sports (which was the governing body for Motor Sports in Sri Lanka at that time) at the time of his death. He was also a past President and Vice President of Sri Lanka Motor Cycle Club (SLMCC) and Upcountry Motor Sports Club (UMSC) on several occasions throughout the last 18 years of his life. After retiring from active participation in 1977, he worked in the administration side of Motor Sports. Priya Munasinghe was a founding member of Sri Lanka Association of Racing Drivers and Riders (SLARDAR) in 1983.
