= Saman Halgamuge =

- Education: Ananda College, University of Moratuwa, Technische Universität Darmstadt
- Occupation: Professor
- Website: https://au.linkedin.com/in/saman-halgamuge-4a49508

Saman Halgamuge is a Sri Lankan academic who is a Professor of University of Melbourne, Australia. He is an elected Fellow of Institute of Electrical and Electronics Engineers, USA, Institute of Engineering Technology (IET) UK and National Academy of Sciences Sri Lanka (NASSL). He is a highly cited expert in his field and listed as one of the top 2% cited experts for AI and Image Processing in the Stanford University Database published since 2020. His most-cited paper being Self-organizing hierarchical particle swarm optimizer with time-varying acceleration coefficients, with over 4000 citations, according to GoogleScholar. He is a Distinguished Speaker/Lecturer on Computational Intelligence appointed by IEEE. He has supervised 45 PhD scholars to completion and delivered over 60 keynotes at International and national conferences.

== Education ==
Saman Halgamuge received his primary and secondary education at Ananda College and gained admission to University of Moratuwa where he graduated with a degree in electronics and telecommunications. Later he attended Technische Universität Darmstadt in Germany to study Masters and PhD in electrical engineering. In 1995 he earned his doctorate in electrical engineering.

== Career ==
He started his research career as a research associate of Technische Universität Darmstadt, Germany and then he was a lecturer in University of South Australia and moved to University of Melbourne where he is a professor in mechanical engineering. He was the founding Director of the PhD training centre Melbourne India Postgraduate Program (MIPP) of University of Melbourne and Associate Dean in International Engagement of Faculty of Engineering and IT, University of Melbourne. He has spent several years as the professor and head (director) of School of Engineering at Australian National University.
