= Mahara Electoral District =

Electoral district of Sri Lanka

Mahara electoral district was an electoral district of Sri Lanka between March 1960 and February 1989. The district was named after the town of Mahara in Gampaha District, Western Province. The 1978 Constitution of Sri Lanka introduced the proportional representation electoral system for electing members of Parliament. The existing 160 mainly single-member electoral districts were replaced with 22 multi-member electoral districts. Mahara electoral district was replaced by the Gampaha multi-member electoral district at the 1989 general elections.

== Members of Parliament ==
Key

Independent SLFP UNP

Election	Member	Party	Term
1960 (March)	S. K. K. Suriarachchi	Sri Lanka Freedom Party	1960
1960 (July)	S. K. K. Suriarachchi	Sri Lanka Freedom Party	1960-1965
1965	S. K. K. Suriarachchi	Sri Lanka Freedom Party	1965-1970
1970	S. K. K. Suriarachchi	Sri Lanka Freedom Party	1970-1977
1977	Tudor Gunasekara	United National Party	1977-1983
1983 parliamentary by-election	Kamalawarana Jayakody	United National Party	1983-1988

== Elections ==
=== 1960 (March) Parliamentary General Election ===
Results of the 4th parliamentary election held on 19 March 1960:

Candidate	Party	Symbol	Votes	%
S. K. K. Suriarachchi	Sri Lanka Freedom Party	Hand	15,098	51.99
Siridatta Jayakody	United National Party	Elephant	9,002	30.99
G. P. Abeywickrema		Cartwheel	1,971	6.79
J. B. Siriwardena		Key	1,561	5.38
Olive Amarasekera		Umbrella	386	1.33
J. A. K. Perera		Star	297	1.02
R. A. Rupasinghe		Lamp	186	0.64
D. R. Jayamanne		Scales	147	0.51
D. C. Jayakody		Book	85	0.29
Valid Votes			28,823	99.25
Rejected Votes			218	0.75
Total Polled			29,041	100.00
Registered Electors			35,120	
Turnout				82.69

=== 1960 (July) Parliamentary General Election ===
Results of the 5th parliamentary election held on 20 July 1960:

Candidate	Party	Symbol	Votes	%
S. K. K. Suriarachchi		Hand	17,791	65.07
Oscar de Levera		Elephant	8,991	32.88
Dayapani Seneviratne		Cartwheel	416	1.52
Valid Votes			27,198	99.47
Rejected Votes			145	0.53
Total Polled			27,143	100.00
Registered Electors			35,120	
Turnout				77.86

=== 1965 Parliamentary General Election ===
Results of the 6th parliamentary election held on 22 March 1965:

Candidate	Party	Symbol	Votes	%
S. K. K. Suriarachchi	Sri Lanka Freedom Party	Hand	20,573	55.49
D. S. Gunasekera	United National Party	Elephant	15,665	42.25
Reginald Pieries		Chair	633	1.71
Valid Votes			36,871	99.45
Rejected Votes			204	0.55
Total Polled			37,075	100.00
Registered Electors			43,874	
Turnout				84.50

=== 1970 Parliamentary General Election ===
Results of the 7th parliamentary election held on 27 May 1970:

Candidate	Party	Symbol	Votes	%
S. K. K. Suriarachchi	Sri Lanka Freedom Party	Hand	27,679	61.88
Tudor Gunasekara	United National Party	Elephant	16,883	37.75
Valid Votes			44,562	99.63
Rejected Votes			167	0.37
Total Polled			44,729	100.00
Registered Electors			51,464	
Turnout				86.91

=== 1977 Parliamentary General Election ===
Results of the 8th parliamentary election held on 21 July 1977 for the district:

Candidate	Party	Symbol	Votes	%
Tudor Gunasekara	United National Party	Elephant	25,016	51.42
S. K. K. Suriarachchi	Sri Lanka Freedom Party	Hand	22,384	46.01
J. A. K. Perera		Star	935	1.92
K. P. D. Karunawansa		Chair	101	0.21
Ananda Maddumage		Lamp	98	0.20
Valid Votes			48,534	99.75
Rejected Votes			121	0.25
Total Polled			48,655	100.00
Registered Electors			54,264	
Turnout				89.66

=== 1983 Parliamentary By-Election ===
In early 1983 Gunasekara resigned as the member for Mahara, with nominations being called to fill the vacancy, closing 22 April. The results of the 1983 parliamentary by-election held on 18 May for the electorate:

Candidate	Party	Symbol	Votes	%
Kamalawarana Jayakody	United National Party	Elephant	24,944	47.99
Vijaya Kumaranatunga	Sri Lanka Freedom Party	Hand	24,899	47.90
S. K. K. Suriarachchi	Independent	Scales	1,837	3.53
R. P. G. Rajapakse		Butterfly	76	0.15
Loku Pulukkuttige Premadasa		Chair	48	0.09
Valid Votes			51,804	99.66
Rejected Votes			177	0.34
Total Polled			51,981	100.00
Registered Electors			65,660	
Turnout				79.17
