= Shelton Perera =

Sri Lankan musician (1939–1986)

Shelton Perera ෂෙල්ටන් පෙරේරා
- Born: Thotagamage Shelton Perera; March 20, 1939; Colombo, Sri Lanka
- Died: September 18, 1986 (aged 47); Colombo, Sri Lanka
- Occupations: Singer, composer, percussionist
- Spouse: Kumari Shashi
- Children: 5, including Sathish Perera
- Relatives: Kumari Perera (sister); Suriya Rani (sister); Ranjith Yapa de Alwis (brother-in-law); Kusum Perera (cousin daughter)
- Musical career
- Genres: Pop; soul; rhythm and blues; Indian classical music
- Instruments: Vocals, Tabla
- Years active: 1954–1986
- Label: HMV

Thotagamage Shelton Perera (20 March 1939 – 18 September 1986), was a Sri Lankan musician and a singer. Beginning his career as a tabla player, Perera became one of the most influential singers in Sri Lankan classical music industry. He is also a prolific percussionist as well as a film composer.

== Personal life ==
Shelton Perera was born on 20 March 1939 in Colombo as the second of the family. Hailed from an artistic background, his father was Thotagamage Wilbert Perera, who was a famous Tower Hall artist as well as A-grade singer in Radio Ceylon. Wilbert Perera's play began with the Vittachchi Tourist Dance Company, organized by Joseph de Silva and Vittachchi. He then joined the Tower Hall Ariya Sinhala Drama Council and performed in stage plays. He performed well in the play Othello that he won a gold medal and the character of "Victor Hamu" in the play Heladiva Puragana also won a gold medal.

Shelton's mother, L. A. K. Somakantha is also a stage actress as well as an A-grade Nadagam and Noorthi singer. She won gold medals for her role as "Princess Chintamani" in the play Chintamani in 1935 and for the role of "Kumarihami" in the play Ehelepola in 1937. Both of her parents were dancers as well as circus performers.

Shelton had one elder brother, Arthur. Then, he has three younger brothers – Gretion, Danson and Rexon. Youngest sister Kumari Perera was a stage actress as well as one of the first presenters on National Television. She worked as a radio presenter for nearly five decades. She died on 13 February 2025 at the age of 68. Her husband, Ranjith Yapa de Alwis, is a music director and a film Director of the Government Film Division. He was the first director and music director of the popular television serial Kopi Kade telecast by ITN.

His younger sister Suriya Rani was a film and stage actress. Her daughter Kusum Perera is also an actress. Sooriya Rani died on 10 October 2022 at the age of 81.

Shelton was married to Kumari Shashi, a Hindi girl who came to study dance at Bhatkhande University (Bhatkhande Sanskriti Vishwavidyalaya). After returning to Sri Lanka with Shelton, Shashi Perera became a Hindi presenter at Radio Ceylon. The couple has five children - Sathish, Sanjaya, Subash, Anuradha and Anupama.

Shelton's son Sathish Perera was a popular singer who started the singing career to continue his father's legacy in 1989. Sathish released two successful music albums, Pem Hasun and Egodaha Yanno. His hits include both his father's and his own creations, such as "Awasan Liyumai", "Sundarai Oba", "Kadulu Walin Pem Hasuna", "Mihirathi Wasantha Kale", "Kandalame Wewa Balanna", "Adareta Haduwak Tharam" and "Maha Muhudu Wimane". On the early morning of 23 April 2012, Satish Perera died at the Oasis hospital at the age of 42 due to leukemia. He was married to Dinesha Perera and they had one son, Akshitha.

Shelton's daughter Anuradha Perera is also a popular singer. Daughter Anupama Perera is a dancing teacher who studied from Bhatkhande University.

He died on 18 September 1986 at the age of 47.

== Career ==
Shelton received his basic music knowledge from W.W. Rupasinghe master. Later, he joined the Government Conservatory from 1954 to 1955 and studied music under its principal, Lionel Edirisinghe. After mastered the tabla, he dreamed to study music in India in 1962. Despite the difficulties, he went to India and entered the Marris Music College (currently called Bhatkhande Sanskriti Vishwavidyalaya). He learned to play the tabla under famous tabla maestros Ahmed Jan Thirakwa, Bade Ghulam Ali Khan and Harishankar Mishra. Meanwhile, he became a tabla player in the Indian Radio Service and worked as a Tabla player for many Indian singers. He holds a master's in music and orchestra from Bhatkanda University of Music.

After graduating from the university, he moved Bombay under the guidance of Madan Mohan who came to Lucknow Radio to participate in an Indian radio program Akila Bharati. Then he played the tabla under Mohan in his program. He is the only Sri Lankan to play the tabla in Bollywood films under renowned musicians such as Naushad, Shankar–Jaikishan, Salil Chowdhury, S. D. Burman, Kalyanji–Anandji and Mohinder Tripathi. During this period, Shelton heard the news of his father's death through a friend and returned to Sri Lanka from Bombay in 1966. This breaks the bond between him with India.

After returning to Sri Lanka, he first went to Uhana Maha Vidyalaya, Ampara as a government music teacher. Shelton was the first Sri Lankan to be appointed as the first Hindi announcer of the Sri Lanka Broadcasting Corporation. Shelton made his film debut in 1967 as the music director in Dommie Jayawardena's first film, Daru Duka. In the film, has composed three solo songs for three songs written by Karunaratne Abeysekera. Shelton then directed the music for Dommie's 1972 film Singapore Charlie with Premalal Danwatte. He continued to work as the music director for many popular films including, Sarubima, Iwasana Danaa and Ahala Pahala. He co-directed the music with Mohammed Sally for the 1974 film Hadawath Naththo directed by Zubair Mackin.

Shelton also contributed as a playback singer in the films including Sinhasuna, Hadawath Naththo and Tom Pachaya. The highlight of his playback career was winning the Sarasaviya Award for Best Singer of the Year at the 1985 Sarasaviya Awards for the film Sasara Chethana directed by Malini Fonseka for the song "Budune Budu Piyanane". On May 20, 1980, Shelton organized the concert "Mihirathi Wasantha" which was held at the Tower Theater. Some of his most popular songs include, "Egodaha Yanno", "Awasan Liyumai", "Maha Muhudu Wimane", "Himidiri Eliye", "Dura Etha Noyana" and "Kandulak Una". Apart from classical songs, Shelton also sung Noorthi songs such as "Seetha Ma Siriya Inne", "Agana Baduya Mewa", "Lankendra Swami" and "Punyawantha".

== Filmography ==
Year	Film	Role	Ref.
1966	Parasathu Mal	Harmonium player	
1967	Daru Duka	Composer	
1967	Sarubima	Composer	
1967	Iwasana Danaa	Composer	
1970	Thewatha	Composer	
1972	Singapore Charlie	Composer	
1974	Hadawath Naththo	Composer	
1974	Sihasuna	Playback Singer	
1974	Sahayata Danny	Playback Singer	
1975	Jeewana Geethaya	Composer	
1976	Deviyangen Kandulu	Composer	
1976	Pradeepe Ma Wewa	Playback Singer	
1982	Sandaa	Playback Singer	
1983	Niliyakata Pem Kalemi	Playback Singer	
1984	Sasara Chethana	Playback Singer	
