= S. K. K. Suriarachchi =

Ceylonese politician (1924–1991)

Suriarachchi Kankanamalage Karunadasa Suriarachchi (5 February 1924 – 1991) was a Ceylonese politician.

Suriarachchi received his education at the Government Senior School in Kadawatha and Ananda College, Colombo. He qualified as an English trained teacher (1st class) and worked as an assistant teacher at the Sivali Central College, Ratnapura. He then joined the faculty at Ananda College, where he taught for eight years.

His first entry into politics was when he was returned uncontested to the Naranwala Village Committee in 1957, and became its chairman.

At the 4th parliamentary election, held on 19 March 1960, Suriarachchi ran as the Sri Lanka Freedom Party candidate in the newly created electorate of Mahara. He polled 15,098 votes (52% of the total vote), 6,096 votes ahead of the United National Party candidate, Siridatta Jayakody. The election results however left neither of Ceylon's two major parties with a majority, with the result being the calling of another election. He was subsequently re-elected at the 5th parliamentary election held on 20 July 1960. This time receiving 17,791 votes (65% of the total vote) and 8,800 votes ahead of the United National Party candidate, Oscar de Levera.

Suriarachchi was appointed the Chief Government Whip in September 1963 serving until 17 July 1964. In September 1964 he was appointed as the Parliamentary Secretary to the Minister of Finance in the First Sirimavo Bandaranaike cabinet.

He retained his seat at the 6th parliamentary election, held on 22 March 1965, receiving 20,573 votes (55.5% of the total vote), defeating Donald S. Gunasekara of the United National Party by 4,908 votes. He was also successful at the 7th parliamentary election, held on 27 May 1970, polling 27,679 votes (62% of the total vote), 10,796 votes ahead of Tudor Gunasekara.

Following the 1970 parliamentary elections he was appointed the Parliamentary Secretary to the Minister of Industries and Scientific Affairs. In 1975 he was elevated to the position of Minister of Food, Co-operatives and Small Industries in the Second Sirimavo Bandaranaike cabinet. On 11 March 1977, following the Communist Party leaving the Government and the resignation of T. B. Subasinghe, Suriarachchi was appointed Minister of Industries and Scientific Affairs a role he held until the dissolution of the parliament on 18 May 1977.

At the 8th parliamentary election, held on 21 July 1977 the United National Party won the largest electoral landslide in Sri Lankan history, with Suriarachchi failing to retain the seat of Mahara, losing to Tudor Gunasekara of the United National Party by 2,632 votes. In early 1983 Gunasekara resigned as the member for Mahara, with nominations being called to fill the vacancy, closing 22 April. Suriarachchi nominated as an independent, following Vijaya Kumaratunga being selected as the Sri Lanka Freedom party candidate. As a result at the by-election held on 18 May the United National Party candidate, Kamalawarana Jayakody, was controversially elected by a margin of 45 votes. Suriarachchi receiving 1,837 votes (3.5% of the total vote).

Suriarachchi died in 1991.
