= Tudor Gunasekara =

Sri Lankan politician and diplomat (1935–2021)

Hon. Tudor Gunasekara
- ටියුඩර් ගුණසේකර
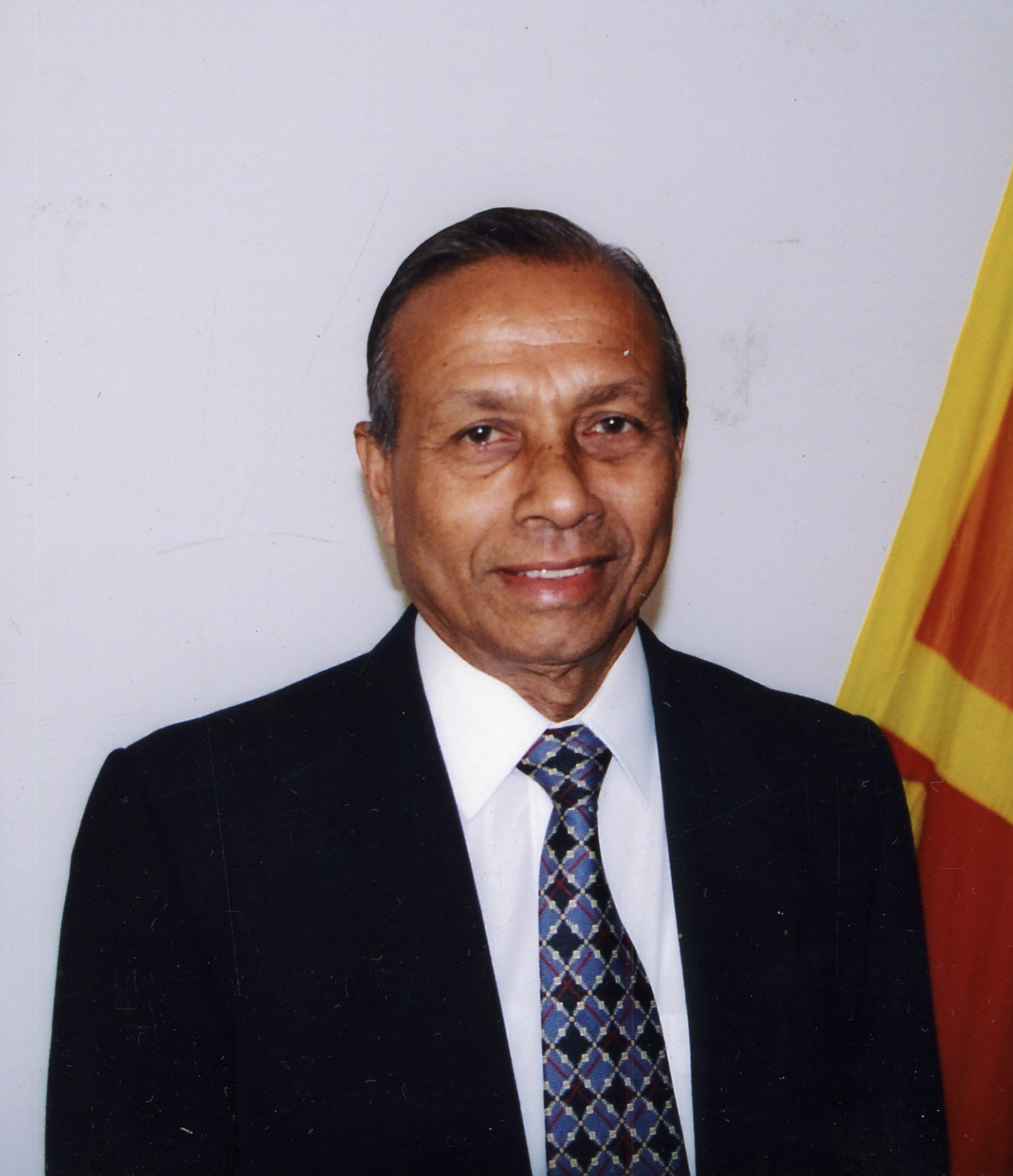

Member of Parliament for Mahara
- In office 1977–1983
- Preceded by: S. K. K. Suriarachchi
- Succeeded by: Kamalawarana Jayakody
- Majority: Mahara

Sri Lanka Ambassador to Poland, Bulgaria, Romania and Hungary
- In office 2000–2003

Personal details
- Born: 23 January 1935 Biyagama, Ceylon
- Died: 29 August 2021 (aged 86) Colombo, Sri Lanka
- Party: United National Party
- Spouse: Chandra (née Perera) (m. 1962)
- Children: 2
- Education: Ananda College
- Occupation: Politician, diplomat

Ranasinghe Hettiarachchige Tudor Edward Ranasinghe Gunasekara, commonly known as Tudor Gunasekara (Sinhala: ටියුඩර් ගුණසේකර; 23 January 1935 – 29 August 2021), was a Sri Lankan politician and diplomat.

From 1977 to 1983, he was a Member of the Parliament of Sri Lanka and a District Minister for Gampaha in the government of President J. R. Jayewardene. Later, from 2000 to 2003, he served as the first Sri Lankan ambassador to Poland, Bulgaria, Romania and Hungary.

== Early life ==
Gunasekara's parents, William and Eugine

Tudor Gunasekara was born on 23 January 1935 to a well known family in Heiyantuduwa, Biyagama in Sri Lanka. He received his early education at Ananda College, Colombo. Gunasekara was the second son of William Gunasekara (also known as 'Heiyantuduwa Ralahami') and Eugine née Seneviratne. William Gunasekara was a wealthy landed proprietor and owned fourteen elephants. One of his elephants was Heiyantuduwa Raja, which carried the Relic of the tooth of the Buddha casket in the Dalada Perahera for several years after the demise of Maligawa Raja. Gunasekara has two brothers, Donald and Henry, as well as three elder sisters, Adeline, Chandra and Chithra.

== Political career ==
Gunasekara entered active politics in Sri Lanka during the late 1960s as the United National Party Chief Organiser for the Mahara electorate. In the general elections of 1970, he ran for parliament as a candidate of the UNP but was defeated. Gunasekara contested once again in 1977 and was elected to the Parliament of Sri Lanka for Mahara electorate. In 1978, he was appointed District Minister for Gampaha in President J. R. Jayewardene's government. He was subsequently appointed UNP Chief Organiser for the Gampaha and Attanagalla electorates. As a result, Gunasekara is known to have held the position of chief organiser for the UNP in three different electorates at the same time. In early 1983, Gunasekara resigned from his seat in parliament and his position as District Minister for Gampaha.

== Diplomatic career ==
Ambassador Tudor Gunasekara (left) handing over credentials to Aleksander Kwaśniewski, President of Poland (right)

In 2000, during the government of President Chandrika Kumaratunga, Gunasekara was appointed as the first Sri Lankan Ambassador to Poland. Consequently, he also served as the Head of the Sri Lankan Mission to Bulgaria, Romania and Hungary. During his time in office, Gunasekara played an important role in promoting Ceylon tea, tourism and strengthening Sri Lanka's diplomatic relations with Eastern European countries. Gunasekara was a member of several Sri Lankan Parliamentary Delegations to India, Indonesia, Japan and the United Kingdom to strengthen and promote the country's regional and international relations.

== Personal life ==
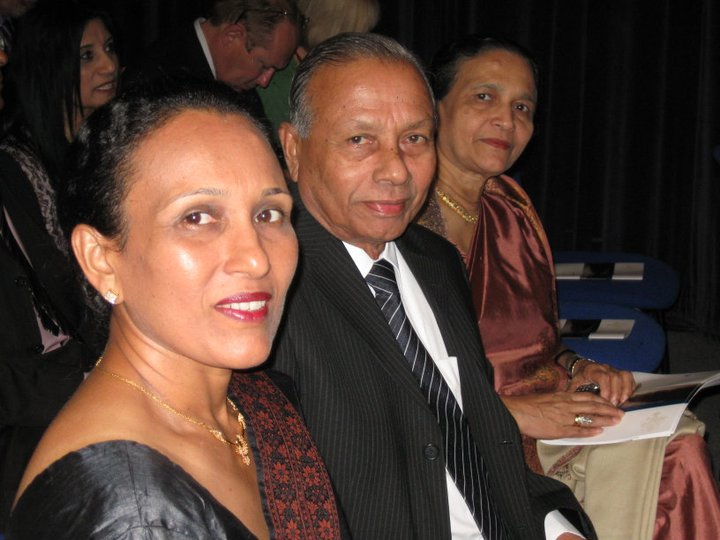
Mr. and Mrs. Gunasekara with their only daughter, Dayanganie

Gunasekara married Chandra Perera, daughter of Albert and Karuna Perera, in 1962. Albert Perera was the Chairman and Managing Director of City Cabs, one of the leading taxi companies in Sri Lanka from the early 1950s to the 1970s. The couple had two children, Dayanganie and Hiran.

Tudor Gunasekara died on 29 August 2021 at the age of 86. He had undergone treatment at a private hospital in Colombo after testing positive for COVID-19.

== See also ==
- List of political families in Sri Lanka
- List of Sri Lankan non-career diplomats
