= Rex de Silva =

Ceylonese aviator

Rex De Silva
- Born: 29 November 1918; Colombo, Ceylon
- Died: 18 August 2005 (aged 86); Australia
- Military career
- Allegiance: (Sri Lanka) Ceylon; United Kingdom; Australia
- Branch: Royal Air Force
- Service years: 1941-46
- Rank: Probationary Pilot Officer (Flight Sergeant)
- Unit: 504 Squadron
- Conflicts: World War II
- Other work: Chief Pilot Air Ceylon

Mervin Rex de Silva (1918-2005) was Ceylonese aviator. He served as a fighter pilot in the Royal Air Force in World War II and later became the Chief Pilot of Air Ceylon.

== Early life ==
Rex de Silva was born on 29 November 1918. His father was John Walter de Silva (a head guard in the Ceylon Government Railway) and his mother Freda (née Ebert). He was educated at St Peter's College, Colombo and later worked as a stenographer. He had flying lessons after winning a scholarship awarded by Lord Leverhulme of Lever Brothers.

== Flying career ==
He volunteered to join the RAF with the onset of World War 2 and was trained at the Elementary Flying School at Fairoaks. He flew Spitfire VB aircraft with 504 Squadron from 1943 to 1944, from Ibsley, Church Stanton and Redhill as an interceptor as well as flying bomber escort missions, escorting Marauder bombers. In 1944 he was posted to 17 Squadron and flew Spitfires (notably MT719/YB J) from Minneriya Ceylon, Calcutta and Chittagong, Assam and Burma. After serving in Bangalore and as Flight Controller in Katunayake, Ceylon (RAF Negombo) he was demobilized.

He was appointed a probationary pilot Officer in the RAF volunteer reserve and gazetted on 9 October 1945.

== Later career ==
On demobilization he was recruited to Air India and flew DC-3 Dakota and Vickers Viking aircraft out of Bombay. He also flew Indian pioneer aviator and founder of Tata Airlines, J. R. D. Tata in a private Beechcraft C-45. In 1947 he joined Air Ceylon and became its Chief Pilot. He married Dorothy Armer in 1947. He immigrated to Australia in 1955, working as a Senior Administration Officer for the City of Waverley in Glen Waverley, Victoria and retired in 1982. He died on 18 August 2005.
