= College of General Practitioners of Sri Lanka =

Sri Lankan professional association

- Abbreviation: CGPSL
- Formation: 1969
- Website: www.cgpsl.lk

The College of General Practitioners of Sri Lanka (CGPSL) is the professional association for general (medical) practitioners (GPs/Family Physicians) in Sri Lanka. Formed in 1969, it was incorporated in 1974 with the incorporation law No. 26 being passed in the Parliament of Sri Lanka. The association does not regulate or certify doctors, a responsibility which lies with the Sri Lanka Medical Council. It carries out education and academic programs in family medicine. From 1980 to 1989 it formed and administrated the first private medical school in the country, the North Colombo Medical College offering its own MBBS degree. Since 1979, it has been publishing the journal of the CGPSL, Sri Lankan Family Physician.

== Membership ==
CGPSL has two grades of membership;

- Members (MCGP) - medical practitioners who have successfully completed the College's assessments and applied for membership.
- Fellows (FCGP) - an honour and mark of achievement awarded to members.

The Faculty of Teachers of the College of General Practitioners of Sri Lanka conduct the course of training and MCGP examination. This is the only diploma program recognized by the Sri Lanka Medical Council other than State University programs.

== See also ==
- Royal College of General Practitioners
