= Sumedha Chandana Wirasinghe =

Sri Lanka born academic

- Education: Ananda College, University of Ceylon, University of California, Berkeley
- Occupation: Academic

Sumedha Chandana Wirasinghe is a Sri Lanka born academic who currently lives in Canada.

== Education ==
Wirasinghe received his primary and secondary education at Ananda College, Colombo, and gained admission to University of Ceylon where he graduated with a degree in civil engineering. Later he received a Fulbright Scholarship to study at University of California, Berkeley. In 2001 University of Moratuwa honored Professor Chandana Weerasinghe with an honorary DSc degree.
