= Karu Esselle =

Australian academic

Karu P. Esselle is an Australian scholar, professor, engineer, scientist and inventor. He is the Distinguished Professor in Electromagnetic and Antenna Engineering at the University of Technology Sydney, Australia. He is the leader of the MetaSteerers Team, which won Australia's national 2023 Department of Defence Eureka Prize for Outstanding Science in Safeguarding Australia. He was named Australia's Professional Engineer of the Year for 2022 by Engineers Australia. He is also a visiting professor of electronic engineering at Macquarie University in Sydney, Australia.

Esselle's other most recent awards include the top Space award in Australia – the "Winner of Winners" Excellence Award – as well as the Academic of Year Award at the 2022 Australian Space Awards, UTS 2022 Chancellor's Medal (which is the top Research Excellence award at UTS), Engineers Australia 2022 Sydney Professional Engineer of the Year title and the Bradfield Award (in addition to the national title mentioned previously), both the most prestigious Excellence Award and the Academic of the Year Award at 2021 Australian Defence Industry Awards, Finalist for the 2021 Australian National Eureka Prize for Outstanding Mentor of Young Researchers, and the Runner Up for the same Eureka Prize in 2020. Eureka prizes are considered "Oscars" of Australian Science. Karu was the Chair of IEEE New South Wales 2016-17 and his contribution to profession earned many awards including 2021 IEEE Outstanding Volunteer Award from IEEE Asia-Pacific and 2011 Outstanding Branch Counselor Award from IEEE headquarters in USA.

== Other Awards and Accolades ==
He was named a Fellow of the Royal Society of New South Wales in 2020. He is also a Fellow of the Institute of Electrical and Electronics Engineers (IEEE) and a Fellow of Engineers Australia. In 2019, The Australian Special Report on Research named Esselle the National Research Field Leader in the field of Microelectronics and Electronic Packaging in Engineering as well as the National Research Leader in the field of Electromagnetism (in Physics & Mathematics Disciplines).

He was the leader of the team that designed the high-gain antenna system on board the world's first entirely Ka-band CubeSat spacecraft - Audacy Zero. The space craft was made by Audacy, USA, and launched to space in December 2018 by SpaceX's Falcon 9 rocket.

He and his co-authors were awarded the 2019 Motohisa Kanda Award for the most cited paper in the previous five years in IEEE Transactions on Electromagnetic Compatibility. He also won the 2019 Macquarie University Research Excellence Award for Innovative Technologies, the 2017 Excellence in Research Award from the Faculty of Science and Engineering,
