= University of Sri Jayewardenepura =

Public university in Sri Lanka

- ශ්‍රී ජයවර්ධනපුර විශ්වවිද්‍යාලය ஸ்ரீ ஜயவர்தனபுர பல்கலைக்கழகம்
- University seal
- Former name: Vidyodaya University
- Motto: Pali: විජ්ජා උප්පත්තං සෙට්ඨා Vijja Uppattam Setta
- Motto in English: "Among all that arise, knowledge is the greatest"
- Type: Public research university
- Established: 1873; 153 years ago (as Vidyodaya Pirivena); 1959; 67 years ago (as Vidyodaya University)
- Accreditation: University Grants Commission
- Academic affiliations: University Grants Commission, Association of Commonwealth Universities, International Association of Universities
- Chancellor: Ittapana Dhammalankara Anu Nayake Maha Thero
- Vice-Chancellor: Pathmalal M. Manage
- Administrative staff: 3950
- Undergraduates: 14,750
- Postgraduates: 3560
- Location: Nugegoda, Sri Lanka; 6°51′11″N 79°54′14″E
- Campus: Main premises at Gangodawila
- Sporting affiliations: Sri Lanka University Games
- Website: www.sjp.ac.lk

The University of Sri Jayewardenepura (also known as Jayawardhanapura University or USJ; Sinhala: ශ්‍රී ජයවර්ධනපුර විශ්වවිද්‍යාලය, romanized: Çri Jayawardhanapura Wishwawidyala, Tamil: ஸ்ரீ ஜயவர்தனபுர பல்கலைக்கழகம்) is a public university in Sri Lanka. It is in Gangodawila, Nugegoda, near Sri Jayewardenepura Kotte, the country's administrative capital. It was formed in 1958 from the Vidyodaya Pirivena, a Buddhist educational centre which was founded in 1873 by Hikkaduwe Sri Sumangala Thera.

== History ==
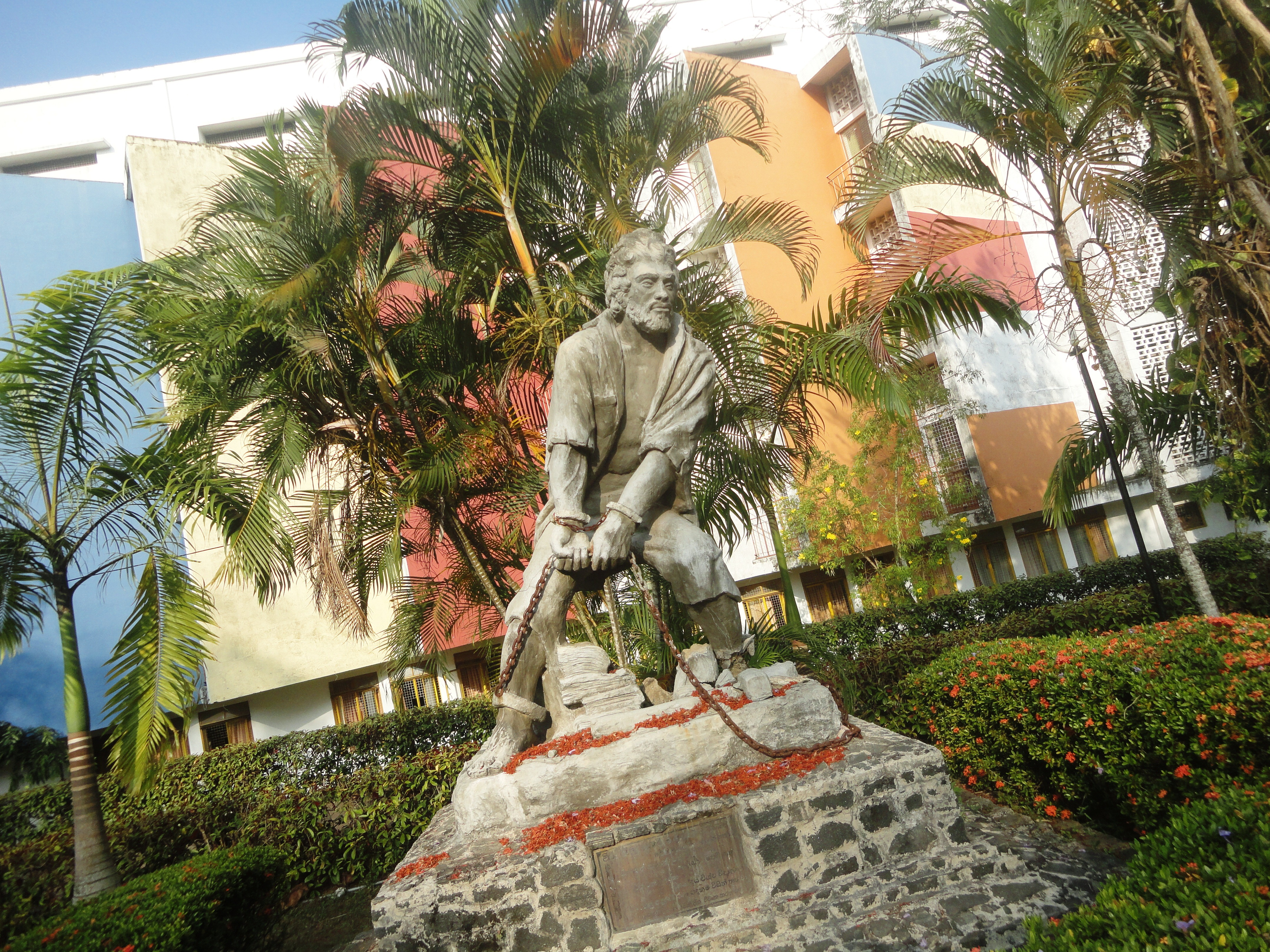
The university's student-hero statue

The university dates back to 1873, when the Vidyodaya Pirivena was established by the Buddhist monk Hikkaduwe Sri Sumangala Thero, who established the pirivena as a centre of Oriental learning.

In 1956, the new prime minister Solomon West Ridgeway Dias Bandaranaike wanted to promote national languages and culture; it was decided to confer university status on the Vidyodaya and Vidyalankara pirivenas. The Vidyodaya University and Vidyalankara University Act No. 45 of 1958 established universities at the Vidyodyaya Pirivena at Maligakanda and the Vidyalankara Pirivena at Kelaniya; the former was renamed the Vidyodaya University of Ceylon.

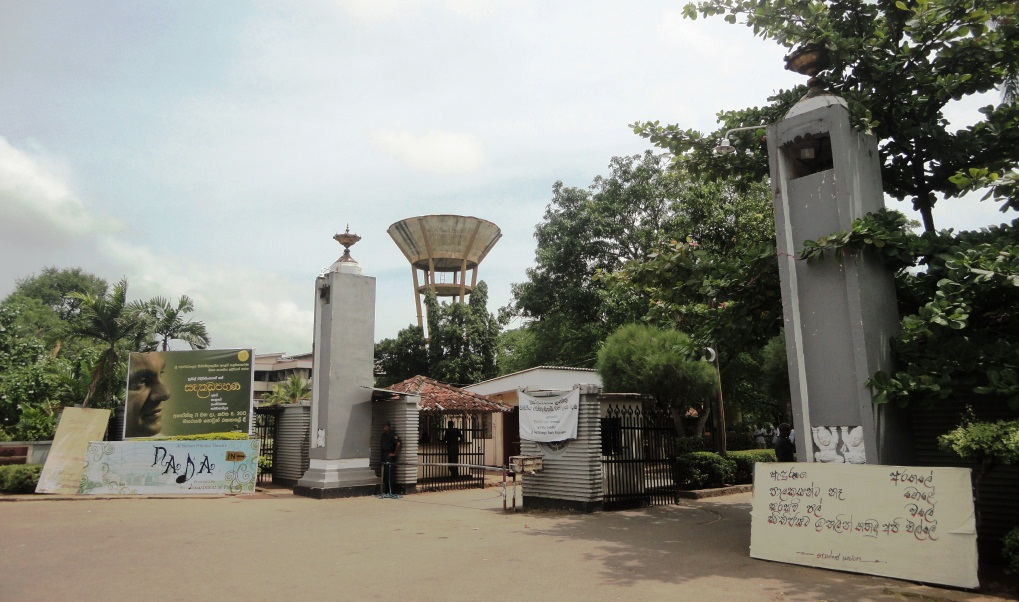
USJ in 2012

A new location was selected in 1961 at Gangodawila, 15 kilometres (9.3 mi) southeast of central Colombo and within walking distance of the High-Level Road (A4) trunk road connecting Colombo and Ratnapura. Part of the land belonged to the nearby Sunethradevi Pirivena, associated with King Parakramabahu VI (1412–1467). The university moved to the new site on 22 November 1961, under the direction of Sri Soratha Thero. The vice-chancellor invited the Department of Government Archives to establish its archives on the campus, near the university library, to encourage research. The Higher Education Act (No. 20 of 1966) opened Sri Lanka's universities to women.

The university expanded during the tenure of Walpola Rahula Thero as vice-chancellor. Rahula Thero was succeeded in 1969 by linguist D. E. Hettiarachchi. At the time, future President of Sri Lanka Mahinda Rajapaksa chaired the campus' United Corporations and Mercantile Union local.

The university's revitalization continued until the 1971 JVP insurrection, when the political atmosphere heavily affected its students' education. After the insurrection, the university was converted into a detention camp for suspected insurgents in 1971 and 1972; lectures were delivered at other locations.

The following year, all universities became campuses of the University of Ceylon under the University of Ceylon Act (No. 1 of 1972). In 1978, their university status was restored.

The university's full-time student population is over 18,000, enrolled in the faculties of applied sciences, engineering, graduate studies, humanities and social sciences, management studies and commerce, medical sciences, and technology.

Chancellors and vice-chancellors
Chancellor	Period	Vice-chancellor	Period
Sir Oliver Goonetilleka, governor-general (ex-officio)	1959 – 1962	Ven. Welivitiye Soratha Nayaka Thero	January 1959 – July 1963
Hon. William Gopallawa, governor-general (ex-officio)	1962 – 1977	Ven. Palannoruwe Sri Wimaladhamma Nayake Thero	August 1963 – September 1966
Hon. William Gopallawa, governor-general (ex-officio)	1962 – 1977	Ven. Parawahera Vajiragnana Nayake Thero	March 1966 – September 1966
Hon. William Gopallawa, governor-general (ex-officio)	1962 – 1977	Ven. Balangoda Ananda Maithriya Nayake Thero	October 1966 – November 1966
Hon. William Gopallawa, governor-general (ex-officio)	1962 – 1977	Ven. Dr. Walpola Rahula Thero	November 1966 – July 1969
Hon. William Gopallawa, governor-general (ex-officio)	1962 – 1977	Prof. D. E. Hattiarachchi	August 1969 – August 1970
Hon. William Gopallawa, governor-general (ex-officio)	1962 – 1977	Prof. Hema Ellawala (vice-chancellor/campus president)	September 1970 – September 1972
Hon. William Gopallawa, governor-general (ex-officio)	1962 – 1977	Prof. V. K. Samaranayake (campus president)	October 1972 – September 1973
Hon. William Gopallawa, governor-general (ex-officio)	1962 – 1977	Prof. M. D. C. Dharmawardena	March 1974 – January 1975
Hon. William Gopallawa, governor-general (ex-officio)	1962 – 1977	Prof. W. M. K. Wijayathunge	February 1975 – May 1977
H. E. J. R. Jayawardana, president (ex-officio)	1978 – 1979	Prof. K. Tuley de Silva	June 1977 – July 1978
Dr. E. W. Adhikaram	1979 – 1983	Prof. K. Jinadasa Perera (campus president/vice-chancellor)	January 1979 – December 1981
Dr. E. W. Adhikaram	1979 – 1983	Prof. T. B. Kangahaarachchi	January 1982 – January 1983
Dr. Wimala de Silva	1984 – 2002	Dr. Karunasena Kodituwakku (competent authority)	February 1983 – March 1984
Dr. Wimala de Silva	1984 – 2002	Dr. Karunasena Kodituwakku	March 1984 – April 1988
Dr. Wimala de Silva	1984 – 2002	Prof. L. P. N. Perera	April 1988 – September 1990
Dr. Wimala de Silva	1984 – 2002	Prof. S. B. Hettiarachchi	October 1990 – October 1992
Dr. Wimala de Silva	1984 – 2002	Mr. W. B. Dorakumbura	November 1992 – October 1995
Dr. Wimala de Silva	1984 – 2002	Prof. P. Wilson	November 1995 – April 1999
Dr. Wimala de Silva	1984 – 2002	Prof. Tissa Kariyawasam (acting vice-chancellor)	May 1999
Ven. Medagoda Sumanatissa Thero	2002 – 2007	Prof. J. W. Wickremasinghe	June 1999 – May 2002
Ven. Medagoda Sumanatissa Thero	2002 – 2007	Prof. Tissa Kariyawasam (acting vice-chancellor)	June 2002 – October 2002
Ven. Medagoda Sumanatissa Thero	2002 – 2007	Dr. D. S. Epitawatta	October 2002 – December 2003
Ven. Prof. Bellanwila Wimalarathana Thero	2005 – 2018	Prof. Chandima Wijebandara	27 July 2004 – October 2005
Ven. Prof. Bellanwila Wimalarathana Thero	2005 – 2018	Prof. Narada Warnasuriya	November – September 2008
Ven. Prof. Bellanwila Wimalarathana Thero	2005 – 2018	Dr. N. L. A. Karunaratne (acting vice-chancellor)	October 2008 – November 2008
Ven. Prof. Bellanwila Wimalarathana Thero	2005 – 2018	Dr. N. L. A. Karunaratne	November 2008 – November 2014
Ven. Prof. Bellanwila Wimalarathana Thero	2005 – 2018	Prof. Sampath Amaratunge	November 2014 – November 2020
Ven. Dr. Ittapana Dhammalankara Thero	2018 – present	Prof. Sampath Amaratunge	November 2014 – November 2020
Ven. Dr. Ittapana Dhammalankara Thero	2018 – present	Prof. Sudantha Liyanage (acting vice-chancellor)	January 2020 – September 2020
Ven. Dr. Ittapana Dhammalankara Thero	2018 – present	Prof. Sudantha Liyanage	September 2020 – present

== Faculties ==
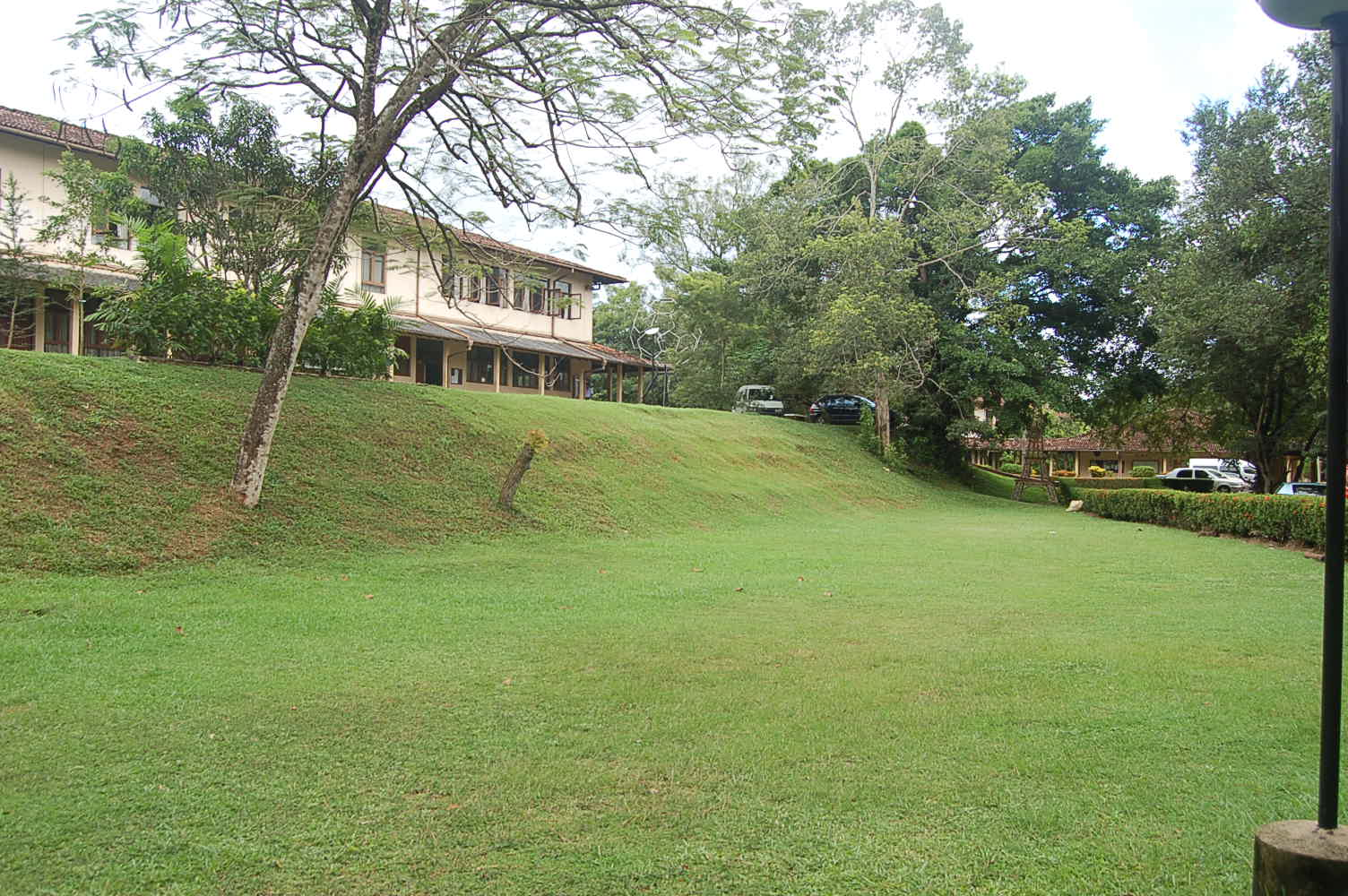
Jayewardenepura Faculty of Applied Sciences

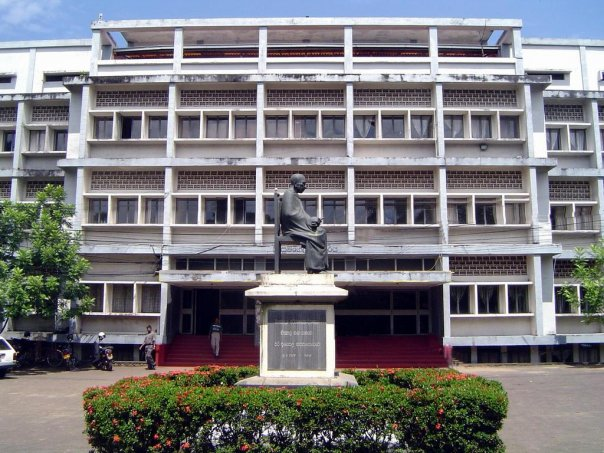
The Sumangala Building, housing the Faculty of Humanities and Social Sciences

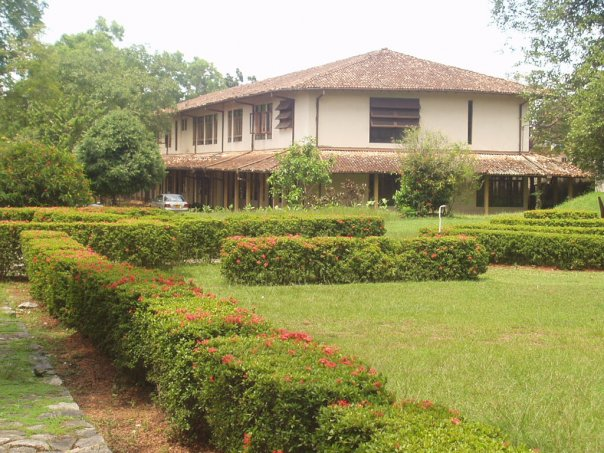
Department of Physics

The university originally had five faculties: Buddhist Studies, Philosophy, Languages, Arts, Ayurveda, and Science. The faculties had 22 departments. SJU currently has eleven faculties: Applied Sciences, Engineering, Graduate Studies, Humanities and Social Sciences, Management Studies and Commerce, Medical Sciences, Allied Health Sciences, Dental Sciences, Computing, Urban and Aquatic Bioresources, and Technology.

The Department of Science was elevated to a faculty of Applied Sciences in 1962, with G. C. N. Jayasuriya as its first dean. Its current dean is Upul Subasinghe of the Department of Forestry and Environmental Science.

The Department of Medical Education and Health Sciences (DME&HS) was established to improve and sustain the quality of the Faculty of Medical Sciences and to present certificate and diploma courses in the health sciences.

== International links ==
=== World Class University Project ===
The University Grants Commission (UGC) defines the World Class University Project (WCUP) as "The implementation of a series of activities on par with international standards and to formulate and implement specific strategies to move up in the internal ranking indexes and become 'world-class' in order to achieve global excellence". The project focuses on encouraging local fields which support innovation leading to national development by prioritizing interdisciplinary studies which combine the basic sciences and the humanities.

The WCUP is designed to develop a research culture at the university. The project, directed by Ranil De Silva, was established to encourage world-class scholars and researchers to develop academic programmes and departments at the university. It has signed six international memoranda of understanding since 2013 and has initiated twelve since that year.

=== Foreign Student Affairs ===
The Foreign Student Affairs Office, chaired by Lalith Ananda, provides students with an opportunity to gain international experience with split programmes, student exchange programmes, and study visits. The office also provides an opportunity for the international community to participate in the university's academic and research activities.

== Research Council ==
USJ's Research Council was established in 2016 to facilitate high-quality research. The council has 18 research centres to facilitate research projects about pressing issues in Sri Lanka. Research awards and editing, foreign travel and publishing-cost schemes have been implemented to encourage research by the university.

== Institutes, units and faculties ==
=== Postgraduate Institute of Management ===
The Postgraduate Institute of Management (PIM), a semi-autonomous, self-financed institute affiliated with the university under director Senaka Kelum Gamage, was established in 1986 under the Universities Act (No. 16 of 1978). One of Sri Lanka's eight postgraduate institutes, it is the only public higher-education body which is ISO 9000:2008 and is a member of the Association of Advanced Collegiate Schools of Business (AACSB).

=== External Degrees and Extension Course Unit ===
When the university was Vidyodaya Pirivena, female students were not admitted. The unit was first established to register women for the Bachelor of Arts External Degree Programme.

=== English Language Teaching Department ===
The English Language Teaching Department (ELTD), part of the Faculty of Humanities and Social Sciences and renamed in 2017 by the University Grants Commission, aims to improve student proficiency in English and introduced a credit course in 2013 for first-year students.

=== Physical Education Division ===
The Physical Education Division, established in 1968, has facilities for 38 sports. Facilities include an outdoor volleyball court, basketball courts, tennis courts, a swimming pool complex, and a cricket ground.

=== Staff Development Centre ===
The Staff Development Centre of the University of Sri Jayewardenepura (SDC-USJP) focuses on increasing the quality of employees with professional development programmes. The centre serves all seven faculties and their units, over 560 academics, 35 academic-support staff, 37 executive staff and 20 non-academic staff.

=== Centre for IT Services ===
The centre manages the campus IT infrastructure.

=== Career Guidance Unit ===
Established in 1998, the unit provides graduates with professional guidance. It has established a Gavel Club, which hosts an annual Speech Master contest. The unit has also established a career-skills-development society which hosts an annual job fair, J’pura employability awards ceremony, OBT Camp, a Donate Happiness cancer-hospital project and an Arunella career-guidance seminar for schoolchildren.

== Sports ==
USJ won two consecutive Sri Lanka University Games, in 2016 and 2019. The university has produced the first undergraduate to participate in the Olympic Games: Sumedha Ranasinghe, in 2016.

== Related institution ==
Vidyalankara University, created at the same time as Vidyodaya University, is presently known as the University of Kelaniya.
