= North Colombo Medical College =

Medical school in Sri Lanka

Coordinates: 6.9270°N 79.8612°E

- Type: Private
- Active: 1980–1989
- Affiliations: University of Aberdeen
- Chairman: Prof G. M. Heenilame
- Location: Ragama, Western Province, Sri Lanka

North Colombo Medical College (NCMC) was the first privately funded medical school in Sri Lanka. It started in 1980 with the admission of 100 local and 20 foreign students. The first batch of students began graduating in 1990. Founded by the College of General Practitioners of Sri Lanka, Dr. G. M. Heenilame was its first chairman and Dr. W.D. Ratnavelle, its first director. It was nationalized in 1989 and became the Faculty of Medicine, University of Kelaniya. The first batch of students of the Faculty of Medicine, University of Kelaniya completed their five-year course and graduated with the MBBS degree in September 1996.

== History ==
In 1979, the College of General Practitioners (CGP) examine the feasibility of establishing a non-profit, fee-levying graduate medical institution as proposed by Dr. G. M. Heennilame which he had been advocating since 1975. Dr Walter Gooneratne and a few others convinced of the feasibility and necessity for a private medical college joined him. In November 1979 the college appointed a Project Implementation Committee comprising Drs Heennilame, Aloysius and Gooneratne “to take all necessary steps to start an undergraduate medical college.”

Between April and July 1980, Drs Sathis Jayasinghe, W D Ratnavale and Shelton Cabraal joined the team. On July 4, 1980 the College of General Practitioners of Sri Lanka appointed the Board of Governors and director of the North Colombo Medical College. The Board of Governors appointed were Drs Heennilame, Aloysius, Gooneratne, Jayasinghe and Cabraal. Dr WD Ratnavale was appointed director. Dr Stanley Kalpage appropriately described this achievement as “truly a miracle”. After all, when these six persons were appointed, the project had no funds, no office, no staff, nothing in writing about approval and little credibility. Yet within one year and two months on 21 September 1981, the President of Sri Lanka, Junius Richard Jayewardene, ceremonially opened the North Colombo Medical College.

The college placed on record those who helped to make the NCMC a reality, with their encouragement and assistance. These included President J R Jayewardene who, from 1979 till the end of his term of office, provided invaluable support. Dr Stanley Kalpage as chairman of the University Grants Commission (Sri Lanka) and secretary of Higher Education played a similar role. The others who provided assistance included Prof Stanley Wijesundera and the academic staff of the University of Colombo, Dr Malinga Fernando, L H R Peiris, Gamini Jayasuriya, B C Perera and Edward Arambawela.

Since its inception the NCMC came under criticism and opposition of many socialist elements in the island, with the Janatha Vimukthi Peramuna which had in 1988 initiated an insurrection carrying out a bomb attack on the NCMC administration section in 1988. The Board of Management conferred its own medical degree MBBS (NCMC) instead of the one from the University of Colombo and affiliated itself with the University of Aberdeen.

In 1989, President Premadasa appointed a committee made up of K.H.J. Wijedasa (Presidential Secretary), W.M.P.B. Menikdiwela (Former Presidential Secretary), Ananda Guruge and Bradman Weerakoon to look into the NCMC. Soon after the NCMC was nationalized with the government sending the army to occupy the buildings at Talagolla stating security reasons. Its board was replaced by a Competent Authority, Prof. Carlo Fonseka. He continued as the first Dean when the NCMC was transferred to the University of Kelaniya as its Faculty of Medicine.

== Notable alumni ==
- Prof. Chandanie Wanigatunge - Professor in Pharmacology

== See also ==
- South Asian Institute of Technology and Medicine
