= Carlo Fonseka =

Sri Lankan physician, academic, and political activist (1933–2019)

- කාලෝ ෆොන්සේකා
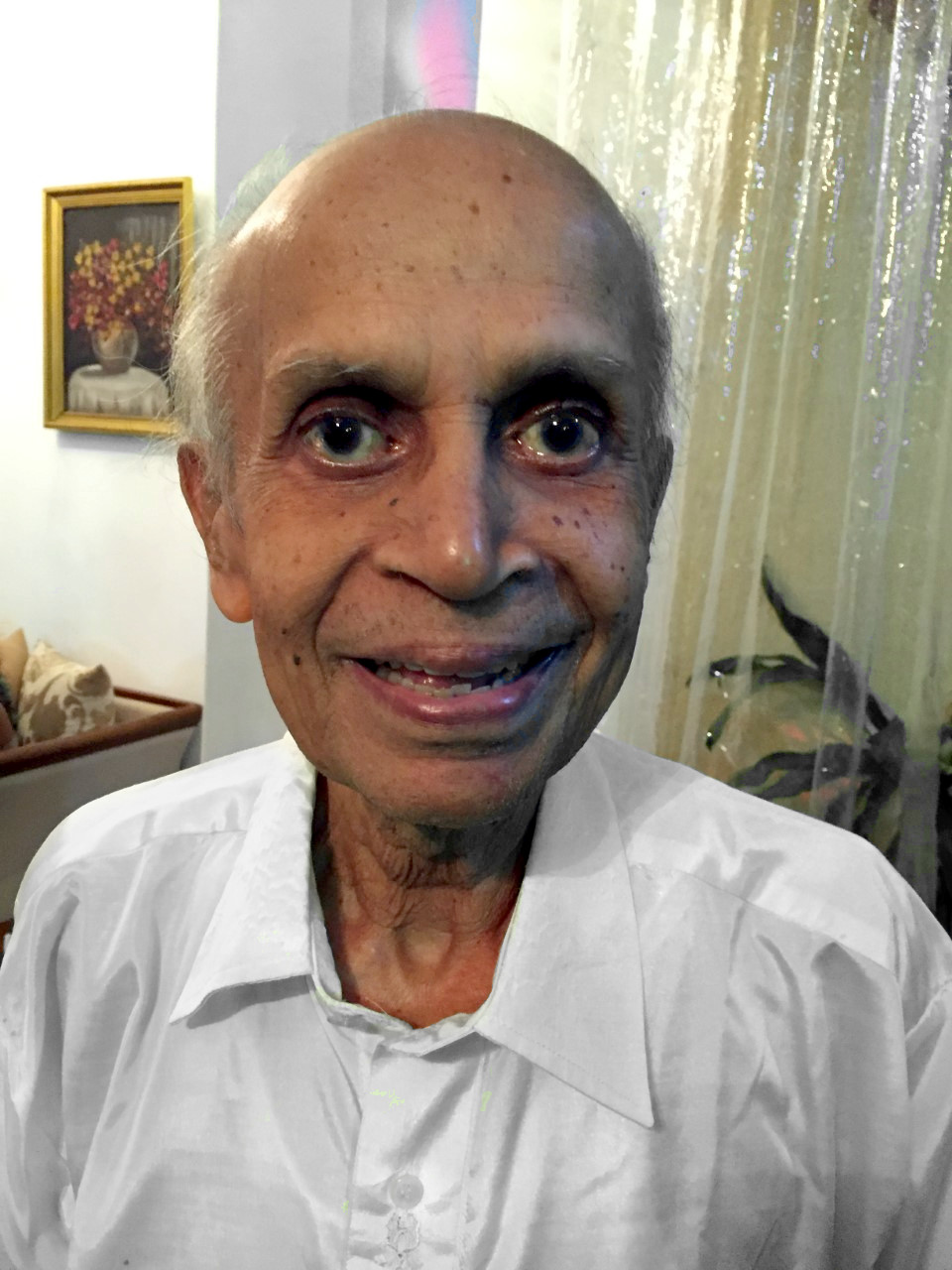
- Born: March 4, 1933; Colombo, Ceylon
- Died: September 2, 2019 (aged 86); Colombo
- Education: Maris Stella College, Negombo; St. Joseph's College, Colombo; University of Ceylon; University of Edinburgh
- Occupation: Academic
- Title: President, Sri Lanka Medical Council.
- Term: January 2012 – June 2017
- Predecessor: Lalitha Mendis
- Political party: Lanka Sama Samaja Party

Carlo Fonseka (Sinhala: කාලෝ ෆොන්සේකා Kālō Fonsēkā; 4 March 1933 – 2 September 2019) was a Sri Lankan physician, academic and political activist. He was a former dean of the Faculty of Medicine, University of Kelaniya and a former president of the Sri Lanka Medical Council.

== Early life and family ==
Fonseka was born on 4 March 1933 in Colombo, Ceylon. His family were Roman Catholics. He was educated at Maris Stella College, Negombo and St. Joseph's College, Colombo. After school he joined the University of Ceylon's Faculty of Medicine in Colombo in 1955, graduating in 1960 with a first class MBBS degree.

== Career ==
After graduating Fonseka joined the Colombo General Hospital as an intern under professor K. Rajasuria and senior surgeon Dr. Noel Bartholomeusz. He then joined the base hospital in Mirigama, near his home village of Divulapitiya, as a medical officer. In 1962 Fonseka joined the University of Ceylon's Department of Physiology as a lecturer. He joined the University of Edinburgh's Department of Physiology in 1964 to pursue his doctoral studies, obtaining a Ph.D. in 1966.

Fonseka returned to the University of Ceylon's Department of Physiology in 1967. He was a professor at the department from 1982 and 1989. The North Colombo Medical College (NCMC), a private medical school, was nationalised in 1989 and in 1991 became the Faculty of Medicine, University of Kelaniya with Fonseka as its first dean. He served as dean until 1997. He was chairman of the Board of Management of the University of Colombo's Postgraduate Institute of Medicine from 1996 to 1997 and from 1998 to 2001. The University of Colombo appointed Fonseka as an emeritus professor in July 2000. He was also appointed emeritus professor by the University of Kelaniya.

Fonseka was appointed president of the Sri Lanka Medical Council (SLMC) in January 2012. The appointment was opposed by the Sri Lanka Medical Faculty Students' Action Committee alleging that it had been made under political influence. Fonseka's tenure at the SLMC was to end in December 2016 but the government extended it by six months. Fonseka resigned at the end of June 2017.

Fonseka was a prominent member of the Trotskyist Lanka Sama Samaja Party (LSSP). He was a member of the party's central committee and politburo and led its branch in Kotte. Fonseka was a vocal critic of private medical education and campaigned against the NCMC in the early 1980s. Whilst president of the SLMC he was highly critical of the South Asian Institute of Technology and Medicine (SAITM), a private medical school. After leaving the SLMC Fonseka claimed he would work to "topple the government" on the SAITM issue.

Fonseka received a M.A. degree from the University of Kelaniya in 1999. He was a fellow of the Ceylon College of Physicians and the Sri Lanka College of General Practitioners. He has served as president of the Arts Council of Sri Lanka, chairman of the Vijaya Kumaratunga Memorial Hospital, chairman of the National Authority on Tobacco and Alcohol and was a member of the University Grants Commission. Fonseka was one of six South-East Asia Region awardees of the World No Tobacco Day 2012 Awards. He was a lyricist and composer and has produced a number of albums including Carlochita Gee (1992), Raththaran Duwe (2006) and Koida Kiya (2015).
