= Nimal Rajapakshe =

Nimal Rajapakse
- Born: Colombo, Sri Lanka
- Education: University of Ceylon (BS); Asian Institute of Technology (MS, DEng) Ananda College
- Occupations: Academic, Professor

Nimal Rajapakse is a Sri Lankan-born academic and engineer based in Vancouver, British Columbia. He is a professor of engineering at Simon Fraser University in Burnaby, Canada.

== Education ==
After a year in a school in his village near Attanagalla, he came to Olcott College and after a year entered Ananda College in grade three. Four generations of his family studied at Ananda College. He gained admission to the University of Ceylon in 1973 from where he graduated with a degree in civil engineering in 1977.

He received a scholarship to study at Asian Institute of Technology in 1979, from which he received a master's degree in 1981 and a Doctor of Engineering in 1983. He was a recipient of Thai King's Scholarship for doctoral studies. Asian Institute of Technology honored him as the Notable Alumni Speaker of the May 2017 graduation.

== Career ==
He was the Vice-President (Research and International) of Carleton University from September 2015 to October 2016. He was a department head and civil engineering professor of University of Manitoba from 1985 to 2000. He served as department head and mechanical engineering professor of University of British Columbia. He became the Director of ICICS at UBC in 2007 and served until 2009. He was Dean of the Faculty of Applied Sciences in Simon Fraser University from 2009 to 2015.

He is a Fellow of the Canadian Academy of Engineering, the Engineering Institute of Canada, and the Canadian Society for Civil Engineering. He has received several prizes and awards for research and professional excellence.
