= Ananda College =

- ආනන්ද විද්‍යාලය
- Crest of Ananda College

Location
- P De S Kularatne Mawatha; Colombo; Sri Lanka; 6°55′30″N 79°52′09″E

Information
- Type: National
- Motto: Pali: අප්පමාදො අමතපදං Appamādo Amathapadan (Buddhist quote from the Apramada Vagga in the Dhammapada) (Heedfulness, Punctuality leads to Nirvana)
- Religious affiliation: Buddhist
- Established: 1 November 1886; 139 years ago
- Founder: Colonel Henry Steel Olcott
- Principal: Lal Dissanayake
- Grades: 1–13
- Gender: Male
- Age range: 6 to 19
- Enrollment: 7500
- Language: Sinhala, English
- Colors: Maroon and Gold
- Song: දින දින කිතුගොස බෝවී
- Affiliation: Ministry for Education
- Alumni: Old Anandians
- Website: Ananda College

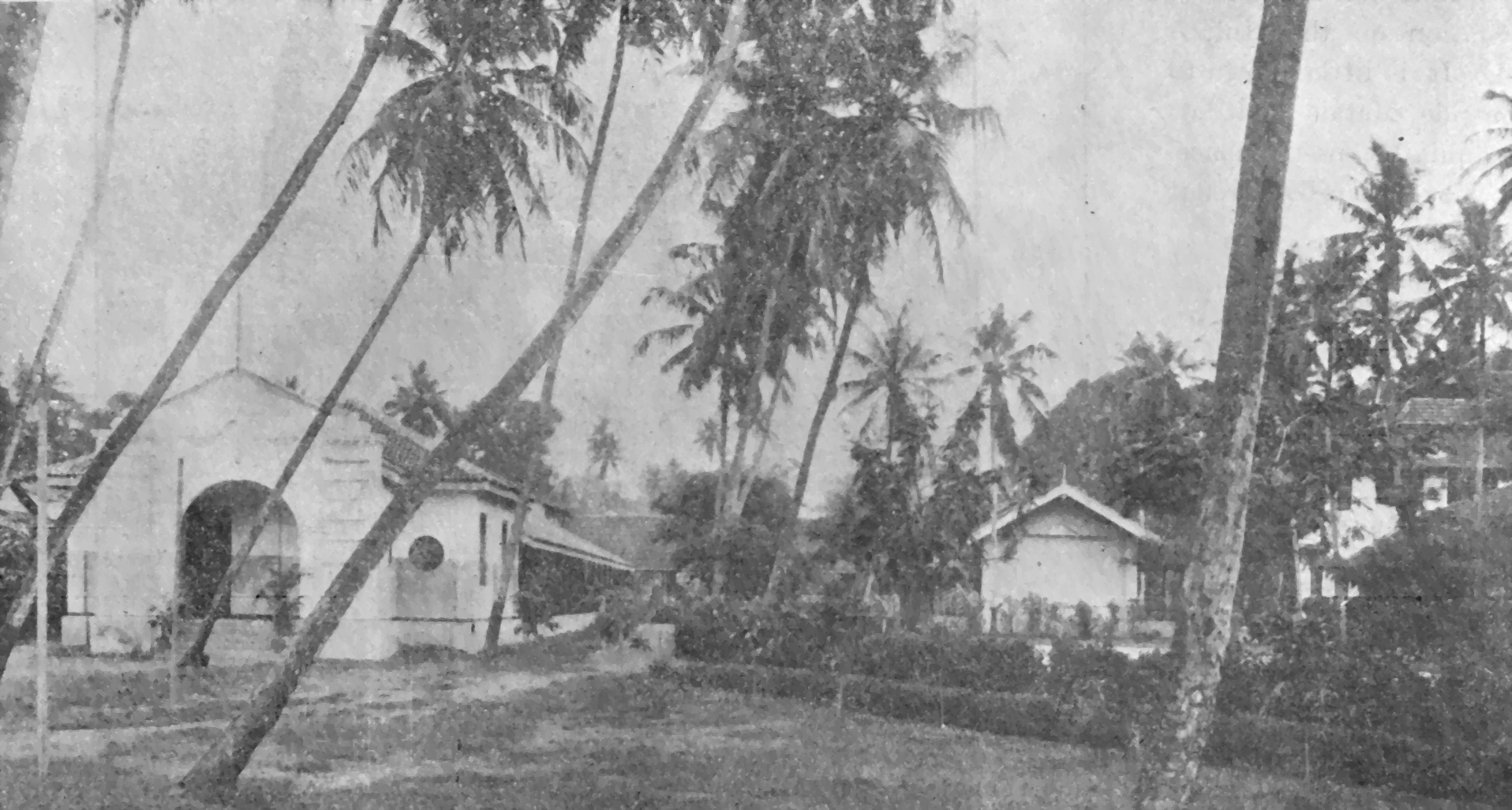
School grounds in 1920.

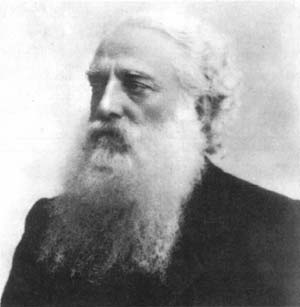
Colonel H.S. Olcott, founder of Ananda College

Ananda College (Sinhala: ආනන්ද විද්‍යාලය) is a prestigious buddhist school in Colombo, Sri Lanka. It is the largest national Buddhist school for boys in Sri Lanka, with a student population exceeding 7500 across 13 grades. It was established as the Buddhist English high school by Colonel Henry Steel Olcott in 1886, following the national renaissance which took place in latter half of the colonial Ceylon.

== Early history ==
Following a meeting of Buddhists at Pettah, under the patronage of Hikkaduwe Sri Sumangala Thera, an English-Buddhist school was inaugurated at 19 Prince Street on 1 November 1886 by the Buddhist Theosophical Society. The 1st session was attended by 37 students. In 1888, when about 130 boys were attending, it moved to 61 Maliban Street. Charles Webster Leadbeater was appointed the first principal of the school.

By the time the school was officially registered in March 1889, there were 120 students. That same year, J. P. R. Weerasuriya became the first Anandian to pass the Cambridge junior examination. The Cambridge graduate and confessed Buddhist A. E. Buultjens became principal.

In March 1890, the school's proximity to a Catholic school led to controversy—and a move to 54 Maliban Street where further growth ensued, and student enrollments rose to 200 in September 1892 and 270 in 1894. As principals followed Don Baron Jayatilaka. That year, Mr. Tudor Rajapaksha donated 3.2 acres (13,000 m^{2}) of land and the school was relocated in the suburb of Maradana. On 17 August 1895, the former English Buddhist school was renamed to Ananda College Colombo, with R. A. Mirando serving as its manager till his death during the 1915 riots.

When Patrick de Silva Kularatne took over in 1918 attendance was 450 which rapidly increased to 1,000 two years later. At this time the annual budget was Rs. 80,000.

By 1961, the college had officially become a government school.

== Ananda Viharaya ==
The Ananda Viharaya is an edifice and heart of the college.

Completed under Col. E. A. Perusinghe, Governor William Gopallawa handed over the Viharaya to the School on 6 March 1969. The Buddha statue has been designed by Venerable Kalasoori Mapalagama Vipulasara Thero.

== Ananda–Nalanda ==
In a tradition dating back to 1924, an annual cricket contest is held between Ananda College and Nalanda College Colombo. The two schools have contributed many players to the Sri Lanka national cricket team, including the old Anandians Sidath Wettimuny recipient of Wisden Cricketers of the Year in 1985, Arjuna Ranatunga (who captained the Sri Lanka Cricket team to victory in the 1996 Cricket World Cup and who was also named as a Wisden Cricketers of the Year in 1999), former mod captain Marvan Atapattu and T20 captain Dinesh Chandimal.

== Old Boys' Association ==
Sir D. B. Jayatilleke, the then principal, conceived the idea of the Ananda College Old Boys' Association in 1908. Initially, its main function was to organise a sports-meet and the annual dinner. In subsequent years the OBA and the school's administration have co-operated in furthering the development of the College. Prior to 1961 (when the school was nationalised), the incumbent principal of the school presided over the OBA. Since that date, a president is elected by members at each annual general meeting. The present president of OBA is Dushmantha Karannagoda.

== Ananda Gallery ==
Ananda Gallery is the official Ananda College Merchandise portal. Ananda Gallery was established in December 2017 by Principal S.M. Keerthirathna.

== Ananda Daham Pasala ==
Ananda Daham Pasala (ආනන්ද දහම් පාසල/Ananda Dhamma School) is the Sunday school of Ananda College. It was started in 2004 as a project of the 81 group.

== Olcott oration ==
Olcott oration is an annual event organized by the old boys association of Ananda College, which commemorate the founder Colonel Henry Steel Olcott of Ananda College and other leading Buddhist schools in Sri Lanka. Every year famous personalities who educated at Ananda College, share their own experience for the "Olcott oration" and renowned dignitaries who have delivered the oration in the past, include Prof. Nimal Rajapakshe, Prof. Sumedha Chandana Wirasinghe and Prof. Ravindra Fernando.

== College war memorial ==
The Ananda College war memorial is situated in front of the Henry Steel Olcott Hall and is dedicated to alumni of Ananda college who died while members of the Sri Lankan armed forces. Lieutenant A. P. N. C. De S. Vaas Gunawardene on 23 July 1983 became the first Anandian officer to sacrifice his life while in the Military. The plaque bears the names of old Anandians who were killed in the line of duty which includes the names of 45 war heroes from the Sri Lanka Army, and many more names of war heroes from the Sri Lanka Navy and the Sri Lanka Air Force. Ananda College OBA organises an annual "Ananda Viruharasara" event to honour the military dead.

== Past principals ==
Name	Entered office	Departed office
Charles Webster Leadbeater	November 1886	October 1889
A. E. Buultjens	January 1890	December 1898
Don Baron Jayatilaka	December 1898	December 1907
J. T. Davis	January 1908	April 1909
Don Baron Jayatilaka	May 1909	April 1910
M. U. Moore	April 1910	November 1913
Dandiris de Silva (acting)	November 1913	January 1914
Fritz Kunz	January 1914	March 1917
C. V. Ranawake (acting)	April 1917	December 1917
Patrick de Silva Kularatne	January 1918	December 1922
Gunapala Malalasekera (acting)	January 1923	July 1923
P. De S. Kularatne	January 1923	July 1932
Lokusathu Hewa Mettananda (acting)	November 1932	April 1935
L. H. Mettananda	July 1935	March 1936
P. De S. Kularatne	April 1936	March 1938
S. De S. Jayaratne (acting)	April 1938	November 1938
P. De S. Kularatne	November 1938	April 1943
A. B. Perera	May 1943	November 1945
L. H. Mettananda	November 1945	December 1954
S. A. Wijayatilake	January 1955	December 1961
M. W. Karunananda	January 1962	October 1964
E. A. Perusinghe	October 1964	May 1969
George Wilfred Rajapakse	May 1969	January 1981
S. K. Nettananda	January 1981	January 1982
V. S. Kudaligama	January 1982	October 1987
A. P. Guneratne	October 1987	June 1995
T. B. Damunupola	June 1995	January 2001
B. A. Abeyrathne	January 2001	June 2008
Lal Dissanayake (acting)	September 2008	November 2009
L. M. D. Dharmasena	November 2009	May 2013
Kithsiry Liyanagamage	May 2013	August 2016
S. M. Keerthirathna	August 2016	January 2022
Lal Dissanayake	February 2022	present

== Notable teachers ==
- Balangoda Ananda Maitreya Thero
- Sikkim Mahinda Thero
- Polwatte Buddhadatta Mahanayake Thera
- Gunapala Piyasena Malalasekera
- Sagara Palansuriya
- Chellappah Suntharalingam
- Tuan Burhanudeen Jayah
- Agampodi Paulus de Zoysa
- Lionel Ranwala
- R. A. Chandrasena
- D. W. J. Perera
- K. M. Rathnapala

== See also ==
- Nalanda College
