= George D'Oyly =

English cleric and academic

- Born: 1778
- Died: 1846 (aged 67–68)
- Occupations: cleri, academic, theologian, biographer
- Father: Matthias D'Oyly

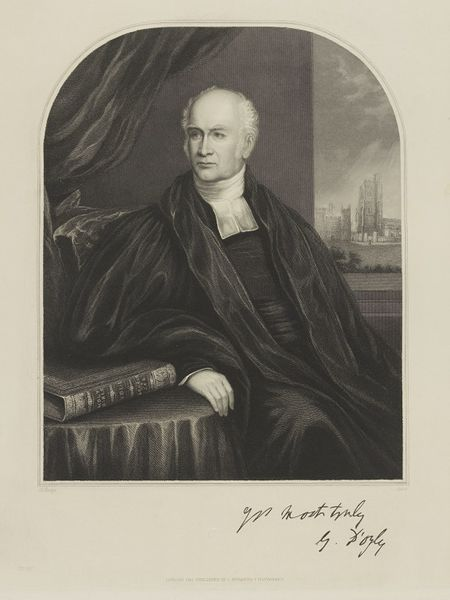
George D'Oyly, 1846 engraving

George D'Oyly FBA (1778–1846) was an English cleric and academic, theologian and biographer.

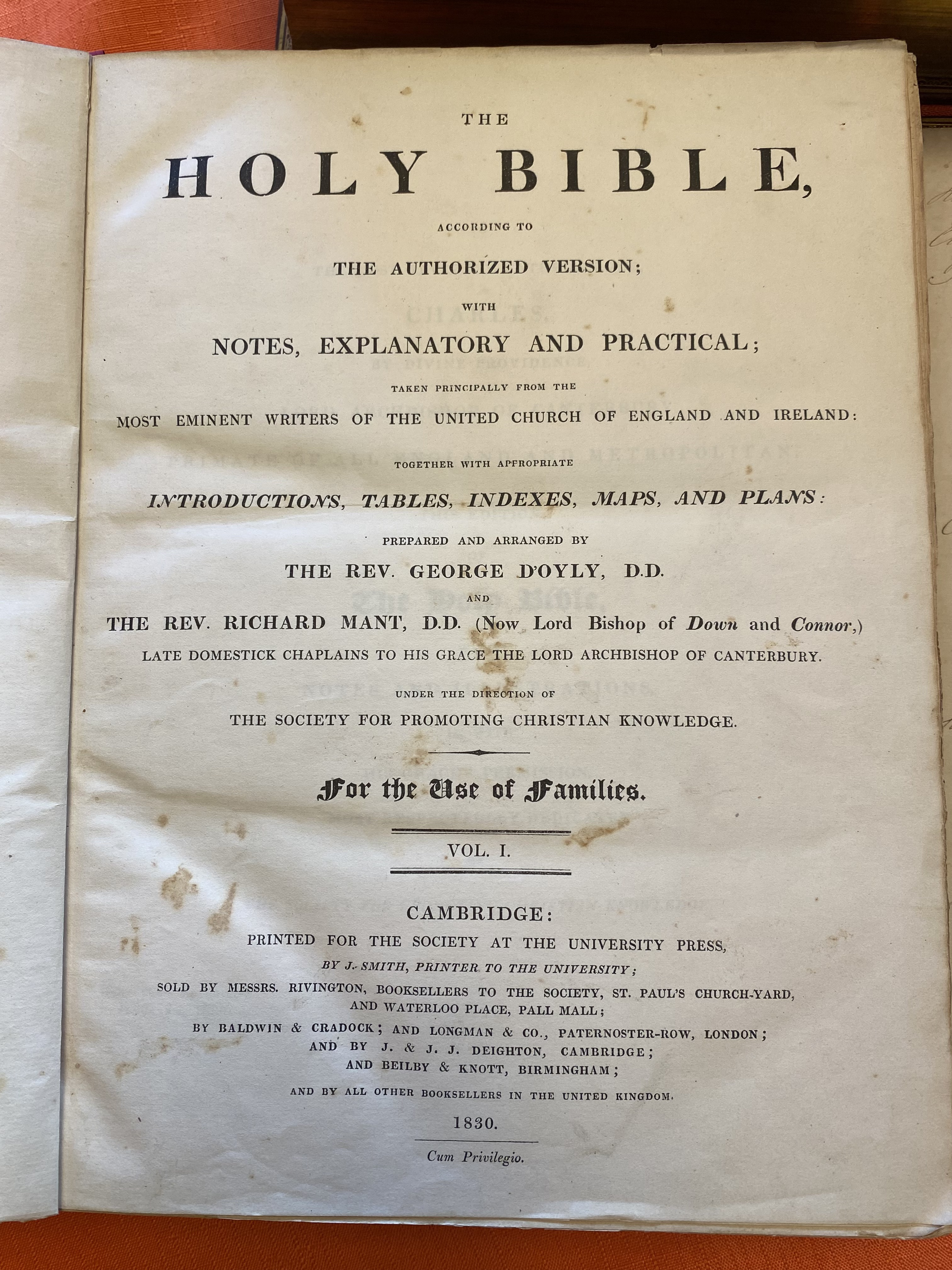

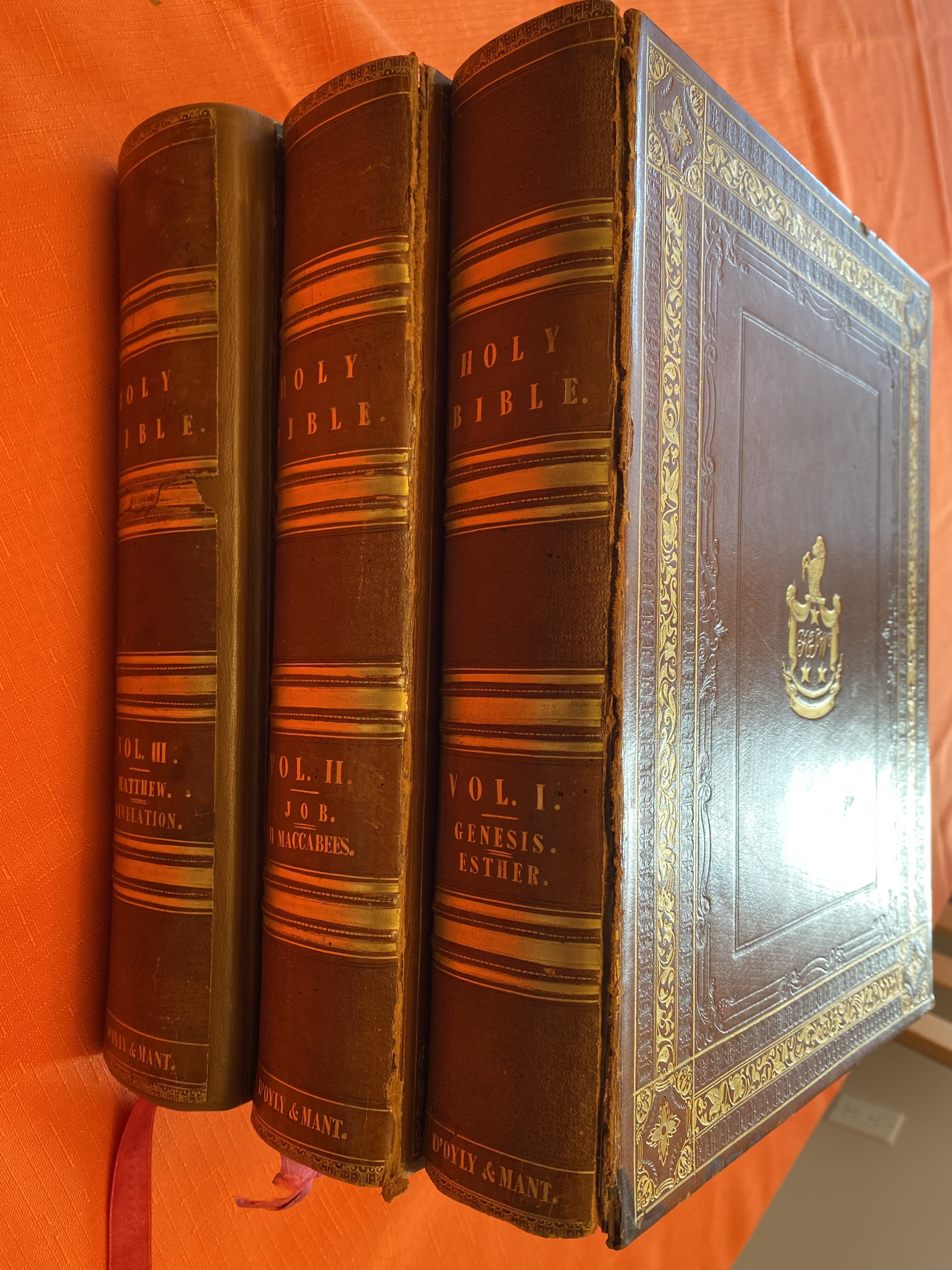

== Life ==
The fourth son of Matthias D'Oyly, archdeacon of Lewes and rector of Buxted, Sussex, he was born 31 October 1778; of his brothers the eldest was Thomas D'Oyly, serjeant-at-law; the second, Sir John D'Oyly; the third, Sir Francis D'Oyly, killed at Waterloo; and the youngest, Major-general Henry D'Oyly. He went to schools at Dorking, Putney, and Kensington, and in 1796 he entered Corpus Christi College, Cambridge. In 1800 he graduated BA as second wrangler and second Smith's prizeman, and in 1801 gained the member's prize for the Latin essay. In the same year he was elected a Fellow of his college.

Ordained deacon in 1802 by John Buckner, the Bishop of Chichester, and priest in 1803 by George Huntingford, the Bishop of Gloucester, D'Oyly was curate to his father for a few months in 1803, and in 1804 became curate of Wrotham in Kent. From 1806 to 1809 he was moderator in the university of Cambridge, was select preacher in 1809, 1810, and 1811, and proctor in 1808.

In 1813 he was appointed domestic chaplain to Charles Manners-Sutton, the Archbishop of Canterbury. In 1815 he was presented to the vicarage of Hernhill in Kent, but before he came into residence he was appointed, on the death of his father, rector of Buxted. In 1820 he accepted the rectories of Lambeth, Surrey, and of Sundridge, Kent, and held them for the rest of his life. In 1815 he was elected a Fellow of the Royal Society.

D'Oyly died on 8 January 1846, and was buried in Lambeth Church, where a monument was erected to his memory. He was known in his day as a theologian; he also, as rector of Lambeth, added thirteen places of worship to the parish. He was treasurer to the Society for Promoting Christian Knowledge, a member of the London committee of the Society for the Propagation of the Gospel, and one of the main promoters of the establishment of King's College London.

== Works ==
In November 1811, by then BD, D'Oyly was appointed Hulsean Christian advocate, and in that capacity attacked Sir William Drummond's theistic work Œdipus Judaicus in Letters to Sir William Drummond and Remarks on Sir William Drummond's Œdipus Judaicus (1813). During his time at Cambridge he was a contributor to the Quarterly Review (some of his articles are mentioned in the memoir by his son prefixed to an edition of D'Oyly's sermons).

D'Oyly also published:

- Two Discourses preached before the University of Cambridge on the Doctrine of a Particular Providence and Modern Unitarianism (1812);
- an annotated bible, prepared with Richard Mant for the Society for Promoting Christian Knowledge ("D'Oyly and Mant's Bible") (1st edition, 1814, &c.; 2nd edition, 1817; 3rd edition, 1818);
- Life of Archbishop Sancroft, 2 vols. 1821;
- Sermons, chiefly doctrinal, with notes, 1827.

His sermons delivered at St. Mary's, Lambeth, were published in 1847 in two volumes, with a memoir by his son, C. J. D'Oyly. Some of his sermons and letters on ecclesiastical subjects were published separately. His letter against the secular system of education of London University addressed to Sir Robert Peel, and signed "Christianus", was recognised in a resolution of the council of King's College, London (13 February 1846) as "giving the first impulse and direction to public opinion", making D'Oyly "virtually the founder of the college".

== Family ==
D'Oyly married Maria Frances, daughter of William Bruere, formerly one of the principal secretaries to the government of India.
