= Francis D'Oyly =

Francis D'Oyly may refer to:

- Francis D'Oyly (British Army general) (c. 1750–1803), British Army officer of the French Revolutionary Wars
- Francis D'Oyly (British Army officer, died 1815) (1776–1815), British Army officer killed at Waterloo, nephew of the above
