= Jayaratne =

- Gender: Unisex
- Language: Sinhala

Jayaratne or Jayarathna (Sinhala: ජයරත්න, romanized: Jayaratna) is a Sinhalese surname. Notable people with the surname include:

== Jayarathna ==
- Samudika Jayarathna, 42nd Auditor General of Sri Lanka since 2026
- Sidney Jayarathna (born 1962), Sri Lankan politician, MP (2001–2004, 2015–2020)
- Y. N. Jayarathna, Sri Lankan naval officer and hydrographer

== Jayaratne ==
- Ajit Jayaratne, Sri Lankan businessman
- Anuradha Jayaratne (born 1985), Sri Lankan politician
- D. M. Jayaratne (1931–2019), Sri Lankan politician, 14th prime minister of Sri Lanka
- Ishan Jayaratne (born 1989), Sri Lankan cricketer
- Jayantha de S. Jayaratne, Sri Lankan army officer
- Osmund Jayaratne (died 2006), Sri Lankan academic and politician
- Piyankara Jayaratne (born 1964), Sri Lankan politician
- T. M. Jayaratne (born 1944), Sri Lankan singer
- Tilak Jayaratne (1943–2012), Sri Lankan broadcaster

== See also ==
- Jayarathna Herath (born 1955), Sri Lankan politician, MP (2000–2024)
