= Vinya Ariyaratne =

Sri Lankan physician

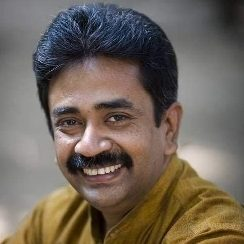
- Born: Sri Lanka
- Education: Nalanda College Colombo; De La Salle University; Johns Hopkins University
- Occupations: Hony.President of Sarvodaya; President of Sri Lanka Medical Association
- Employer: Sarvodaya Shramadana Movement
- Known for: Community Medicine, Development, Sarvodaya Movement Sarvodaya Institute of Higher Learning, Deshodaya movement, Sarvodaya
- Parent: A. T. Ariyaratne
- Website: Sarvodaya

Dr Vinya S Ariyaratne is the Honorary President of Sarvodaya Shramadana Movement of Sri Lanka. He is the eldest son of Dr A. T. Ariyaratne the founder and President of the Sarvodaya Shramadana Movement in Sri Lanka. He is a Medical Doctor by profession. and a Development Practitioner. He is also a lecturer in Community Medicine Faculty of Medical Sciences University of Sri Jayewardenepura in Sri Lanka. Vinya is also the 129th President of the Sri Lanka Medical Association.

== Early life and education ==
Vinya was educated at Nalanda College Colombo. And he received his Doctor of Medicine degree from De La Salle University in Philippines in 1989. Then he received his Master of Public Health degree from Johns Hopkins University in 1990. He was a visiting fellow at Liverpool School of Tropical Medicine in 1992. He holds Master of Science and Doctor of Medicine in Community Medicine from Post graduate institute of Medicine of the University of Colombo, Sri Lanka.

== Career ==
He was a lecturer in community medicine at Faculty, Medicine of University of Sri Jayawardenapura.

=== Social Movements ===
In the year 2000, he became executive director of Sarvodaya Movement. Vinya was also the former Chairman of Deshodaya Development Finance Company Limited (DDFC) which is a micro-finance and enterprise development arm of Sarvodaya. He was the founder of Sarvodaya Institute of Higher Learning.

=== Politics ===
He became active in politics for 2019 Presidential Election by leading National Peoples Movement which was formed by uniting multiple civil organisations including Deshodaya.

== See also ==
- Sarvodaya
