= Robert Boyd (civil servant) =

3rd Accountant General and Civil Auditor
- In office 29 September 1802 – 1 October 1806
- Preceded by: Thomas Frazer
- Succeeded by: Samuel Tolfrey

Treasurer of Ceylon
- In office 1809–1812
- Succeeded by: J. W. Carrington

Robert Boyd was the third Accountant General and Civil Auditor in British Ceylon. He was appointed on 29 September 1802, succeeding Thomas Frazer, and held the office until 1 October 1806. He was succeeded by Samuel Tolfrey.

Sent as a civil servant to Ceylon in 1801, Boyd became Commissioner of Revenue, and was retired in 1836. He became treasurer in 1809.

Legal offices
Preceded by Thomas Frazer	Accountant General and Civil Auditor; 1802–1806	Succeeded by Samuel Tolfrey
