= Governor Ellis =

Governor Ellis may refer to:

- F. R. Ellis (1849–1915), 8th Governor of North Borneo from 1911 to 1912
- Henry Ellis (governor) (1721–1806), 6th Colonial Governor of Georgia from 1758 to 1760 and Governor of Nova Scotia from 1760 to 1763
- Thomas Hobart Ellis (1894–1981), Governor of East Pakistan from 1954 to 1954
