= National People's Movement =

National People's Movement can refer to:

- National People's Movement (Morocco)
- National People's Movement (Poland)
- National People's Movement (Sri Lanka)

== See also ==
- People's National Movement
