= Thomas Frazer =

Thomas Frazer may refer to:

- Thomas Frazer (stonemason) (1821–1904), Scottish-born American stonemason in Beaver County, Utah
- Thomas Frazer (Auditor General), Sri Lanka
- Thomas K. Frazer, American marine scientist

== See also ==
- Thomas Fraser (disambiguation)
- Tommie Frazier (born 1974), American football player
