= Thomas Eden =

Thomas Eden may refer to:

- Thomas Eden (politician) (died 1645), English politician
- Thomas Eden (civil servant) (1787–1845), English civil servant in Ceylon
- Thomas Eden (cricketer) (1855–1914), New Zealand cricketer
- Thomas Watts Eden (1863–1946), English obstetric physician
