= Thomas Fraser =

Thomas Fraser may refer to:

- Thomas Fraser (Upper Canada politician) (1749–1821), soldier and political figure in Upper Canada
- Thomas Fraser, Scot of Clan Fraser of Muchalls, who erected the towerhouse that later became known as Muchalls Castle
- Thomas Fraser (singer) (1927–1978), country and western singer from Shetland, Scotland
- Thomas Fraser (deacon), first settler of New Glasgow, Nova Scotia
- Thomas Fraser (South African cricketer) (1912–1995), South African cricketer
- Thomas Fraser (New Zealand cricketer) (1917–1998), New Zealand cricketer
- Tom Fraser (1911–1988), British politician
- Tommy Fraser (born 1987), English footballer
- Thomas Fraser, 10th Lord Lovat (1631–1699), Scottish peer
- Thomas Fraser, 12th Lord Lovat (1802–1875), Scottish peer
- Thomas Richard Fraser (1841–1920), British physician and pharmacologist
- Thomas Fraser (New Zealand politician) (1808–1891), member of parliament in Otago, New Zealand
- Thomas Fraser (bishop) (1915–1989), bishop of the Episcopal Diocese of North Carolina
- Thomas B. Fraser (1860–1925), associate justice of the South Carolina Supreme Court
- Thomas E. Fraser (1901–1942), officer in the United States Navy
  - USS Thomas E. Fraser, a Robert H. Smith-class destroyer minelayer in the United States Navy
- Thomas H. Fraser, ichthyologist and expert in cardinalfishes
- Thomas Fraser, 2nd Lord Lovat (died 1524), Scottish peer
- Thomas Fraser, 4th Laird of Lovat (died c. 1455), Scottish lord
- Sir Thomas Fraser (British Army officer) (1840–1922)
- Thomas Fraser (Royal Navy officer) (1796–1870), vice-admiral
- Thomas Fraser (physician) (1872–1951), Scottish physician
- Thomas K. Fraser (1844–1904), American leather businessman and politician from New York

== See also ==
- Thomas Frazer (disambiguation), which includes:
  - Thomas Frazer (stonemason) (1821–1904), American mason
  - Thomas Frazer (Auditor General), 2nd Civil Auditor and Accountant General of Ceylon
- Tommie Frazier (born 1974), American football player
