= Cecil Smith (Auditor General) =

1st Accountant and Auditor General
- In office 24 January 1799 – September 1799
- Preceded by: Office Created
- Succeeded by: Thomas Frazer

Cecil Smith was the first Accountant and Auditor General of Sri Lanka. He was appointed on 24 January 1799, and held the office until September 1799. He was succeeded by Thomas Frazer.

Legal offices
Preceded by Office Created	Accountant and Auditor General; 1799	Succeeded by Thomas Frazer
