= S. M. Sabry =

35th Auditor General of Sri Lanka
- In office 26 January 1993 – 13 August 2000
- Preceded by: W. Gamini Epa
- Succeeded by: Sarath Chandrasiri Mayadunne

S. M. Sabry was the 35th Auditor General of Sri Lanka. He was appointed on 26 January 1993, succeeding W. Gamini Epa, and held the office until 13 August 2000. He was succeeded by Sarath Chandrasiri Mayadunne.

Legal offices
Preceded by W. Gamini Epa	Auditor General of Sri Lanka; 1993–2000	Succeeded by Sarath Chandrasiri Mayadunne
