= Thomas Lane (VC) =

Irish recipient of the Victoria Cross (1836–1889)

Thomas Lane VC
- Born: May 1836; Cork City, County Cork, Ireland
- Died: 12 April 1889 (aged 52); Kimberley, South Africa
- Military career
- Allegiance: United Kingdom
- Branch: British Army
- Units: Crimean War; Second Anglo-Chinese War; Anglo-Zulu War
- Awards: Victoria Cross (forfeited)

Thomas Lane VC (May 1836 – 12 April 1889) was an Irish recipient of the Victoria Cross, the highest award for gallantry in the face of the enemy that can be awarded to British and Commonwealth forces.

He was born in Cork, Ireland, in May 1836, and served throughout the Crimean War in the 47th Regiment of Foot.

== Military service ==
On 21 August 1860 at the Taku Forts, China, during the Second China War, Lane, then aged 24 and a private in the 67th (South Hampshire) Regiment of Foot (later The Royal Hampshire Regiment), British Army and a Lieutenant Nathaniel Burslem of his regiment were awarded the Victoria Cross:

For distinguished gallantry in swimming the Ditches of the North Taku Fort, and persevering in attempting during the assault, and before the entrance of the Fort had been effected by any one, to enlarge an opening in the Wall, through which they eventually

entered, and, in doing so, were both severely wounded.

He fought in the Anglo-Zulu War as a sergeant with the 3rd Natal Native Contingent. This unit was disbanded at Rorke's Drift after the siege, and the officers and non-commissioned officers formed three troops of the Natal Horse. He also fought in Landrey's Light Horse in Basutoland in 1881–1882. His VC gratuity was paid from the consulate in Boston, United States, and also in Auckland, New Zealand, during the 1870s.

Lane was one of eight men whose VCs were forfeited. He was stripped of the medal on 7 April 1881 after being convicted of desertion on active service and theft of a "horse, arms and accoutrements". However, King George V felt that no VC should be forfeited and although the present warrant retains the forfeiture clause, no award have been forfeited since the King's 1920 comments. The eight recipients who forfeited their awards have always been included on official War Office lists of VC holders but with a note at the end of the alphabetical list of recipients prior to the First World War stating the names and dates of the warrants that cancelled their awards.

The British Government insisted on the return of his medal from the South African authorities. However, Lane had entrusted his VC to a friend, so the South Africans made a copy and sent that to the War Office. His original medal was found in a pawnshop in 1909. Both are now in the possession of The Royal Hampshire Regiment Museum & Memorial Garden in Winchester, Hampshire, England.

He died in Kimberley, South Africa on 12 April 1889 as a member of the Kimberley Police.

== See also ==
- The Register of the Victoria Cross (1981, 1988 and 1997)
