= James Scott Mason =

British colonial administrator (1874–1912

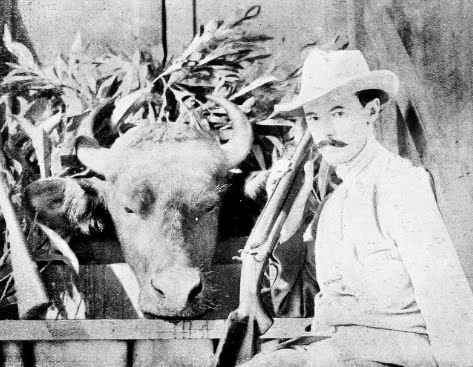
- Mason from a 1908 publication

Governor of North Borneo
- In office 1 November 1912 – 6 December 1912 (Died in office)
- Preceded by: Francis Robert Ellis
- Succeeded by: Cecil William Chase Parr

First British Resident of Kelantan
- In office 1910–1912
- Preceded by: Office created
- Succeeded by: James E. Bishop

Personal details
- Born: 31 March 1873 Manchester
- Died: 6 December 1912 (aged 39) Jesselton (now Kota Kinabalu)
- Education: Brasenose College, Oxford
- Occupation: Colonial administrator

James Scott Mason (31 March 1873 – 6 December 1912) was a British colonial administrator who was Governor of British North Borneo and the first British Adviser in the state of Kelantan.

== Early life and education ==
Mason was born on 31 March 1873 in Manchester. He was educated at Manchester Grammar School and Brasenose College, Oxford. In 1899, he passed the final law examination at Lincoln's Inn.

== Career ==
Mason was appointed a cadet in the Federated Malay States civil service on 6 November 1896, and went to Perak where he served in various capacities including in succession: acting Collector of Land Revenue, Batang Padang; acting assistant District Magistrate, Tanjong Malim; acting Collector of Land Revenue, Matang; acting assistant Magistrate and Collector of Land Revenue, Krian; acting District Officer, Klang, and received the thanks of the Perak Government for services in connection with the Krian smallpox riots in 1899. Also acting Collector of Land Revenue, Lower Perak; assistant District Officer, Raub, Pahang, and on Raub being made a separate district was appointed District Officer; District Officer, Jelebu, Negeri Sembilan, but continued to act as District Officer, Raub, and State Treasurer, Perak.

In March 1910, Mason was appointed the first British Adviser to the Government of the state of Kelantan following the signing of the Anglo-Siamese Treaty of 1909 which provided that all rights of suzerainty, protection, administration and control possessed by Siam passed to the British government who had the right to appoint an Adviser to the Sultan whose advice the Sultan undertook to follow on all matters except religion and custom. The position required much tact and skill as a diplomat which Mason carried out successfully, much to the advantage of the Sultan and the state. Policies introduced by Mason lead to an increase in prosperity of the state as evidenced in the large increase in the trade returns. His abolition of many farm monopolies on various goods led to increased competition and boosted trade, and large areas of land were opened up for mining and agricultural development when a number of large concession holders of land were required to relinquish or divide their holdings.

In 1912, Mason was appointed governor of British North Borneo and assumed his duties on 1 November 1912. On 6 December 1912, whilst riding in Jesselton (now Kota Kinabalu), he was thrown from his horse when the saddle straps broke, and he died instantly. He was buried in Jesselton cemetery.

== Personal life ==
Mason married Mabel Metcalfe on 23 June 1904. He was a keen sportsman, president of his polo local club, and a successful big-game hunter.

== Memorials ==
A bronze memorial tablet was placed in St Barnabus Church, Klang, later moved to St Mary's Cathedral, Kuala Lumpur, and a street was named after him in Raub, Pahang.
