= Nathaniel Burslem =

Recipient of the Victoria Cross (1837–1865)

Nathaniel Godolphin Burslem
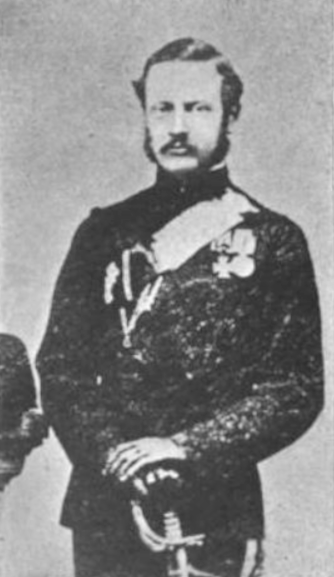
- Born: 2 February 1837; Limerick, Ireland
- Died: 14 July 1865 (aged 28); Waihou River, New Zealand
- Military career
- Allegiance: United Kingdom
- Branch: British Army
- Rank: Captain
- Units: 67th Regiment of Foot
- Conflicts: Second Opium War
- Awards: Victoria Cross

Nathaniel Godolphin Burslem VC (2 February 1837 – 14 July 1865), born in Limerick, Ireland; was an Anglo-Irish recipient of the Victoria Cross, the highest and most prestigious award for gallantry in the face of the enemy that can be awarded to British and Commonwealth forces.

== History and career ==
Burslem was born 2 February 1836 in County Limerick, Ireland, the son of George James Burslem of the 94th Regiment of Foot and Susan (née Vokes), of Limerick (married Dublin 15 March 1836). His father was English, and traced his family back to the town of Burslem in Staffordshire. His grandfather was Colonel Nathaniel Godolphin Burslem who was awarded the Gold Medal - the forerunner of the VC Medal.

On 21 August 1860 at the Taku Forts, China, during the Second China War Lieutenant Burslem, then aged 24 and serving in the 67th Regiment of Foot, British Army, and Private Thomas Lane of his regiment displayed great gallantry for which they were both awarded the VC. They swam the ditches of the North Taku Fort and attempted, during the assault and before an entrance had been effected by anyone, to enlarge an opening in the wall, through which they eventually entered. In doing so, they were both severely wounded.

His Victoria Cross is displayed at The Royal Hampshire Regiment Museum & Memorial Garden, Winchester, England. He later achieved the rank of captain before selling his commission and sailing, along with his brother John Godolphin Burslem, to New Zealand. He arrived in 1865 and bought land in the North Island and was planning to grow flax, but he and an acquaintance capsized their canoe on the Thames River, both drowning on 14 July 1865. His body was not recovered.
