= P. A. Pematilaka =

37th Auditor General of Sri Lanka
- In office 23 October 2006 – 3 January 2007
- Preceded by: Sarath Chandrasiri Mayadunne
- Succeeded by: S. Swarnajothi

P. A. Pematilaka was the 37th Auditor General of Sri Lanka. He was appointed on 23 October 2006, succeeding Sarath Chandrasiri Mayadunne, and held the office until 3 January 2007. He was succeeded by S. Swarnajothi.

Legal offices
Preceded by Sarath Chandrasiri Mayadunne	Auditor General of Sri Lanka; 2006–2007	Succeeded by S. Swarnajothi
