= Edward Tolfrey =

8th Civil Auditor General
- In office 2 March 1816 – 1 December 1817
- Preceded by: John D'Oyly
- Succeeded by: John William Carrington

Personal details
- Born: c. 1784
- Died: 9 August 1821 Kandy, Sri Lanka

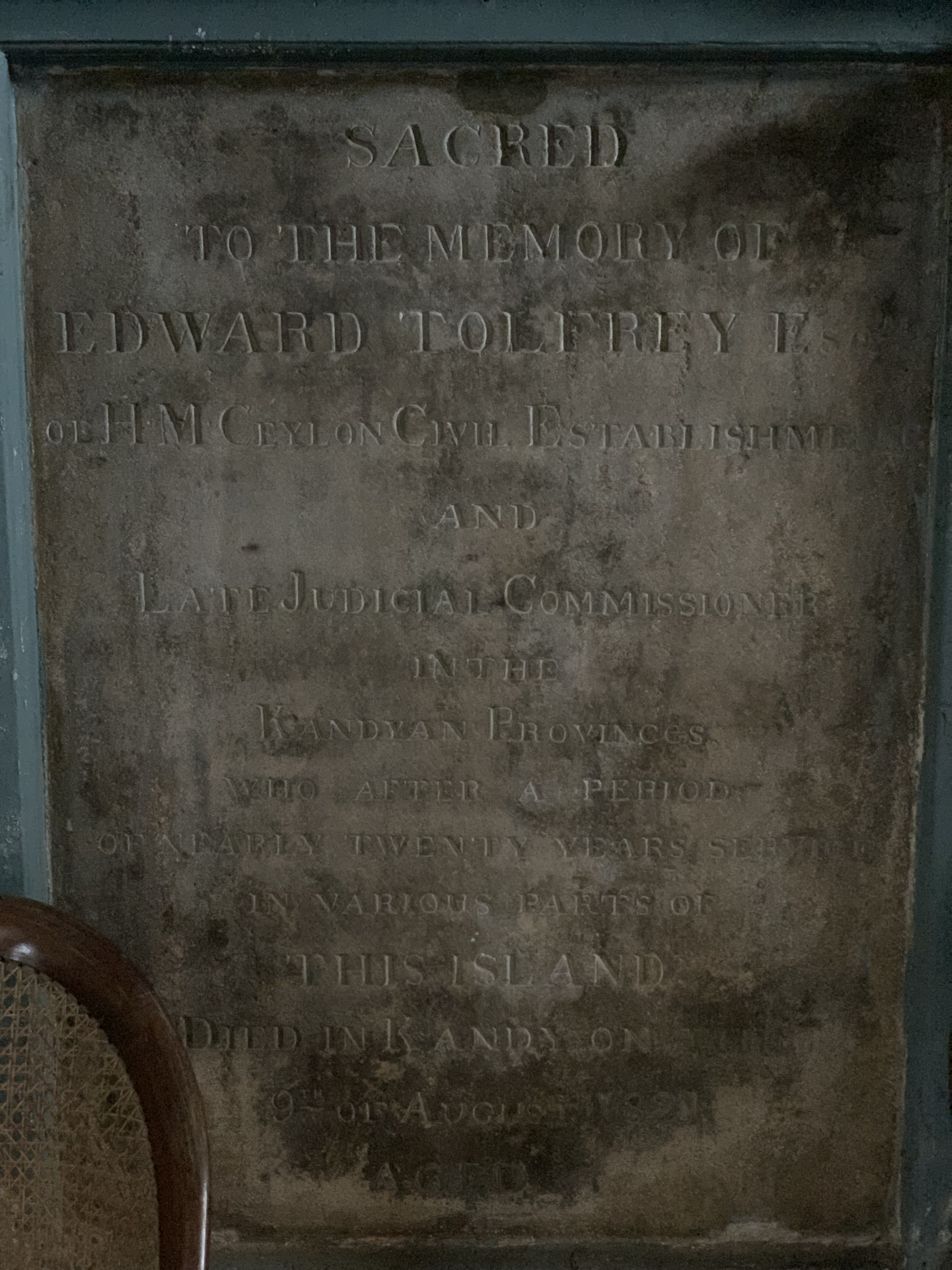

Edward Tolfrey (c. 1784 – 9 August 1821) was the eighth Civil Auditor General of British Ceylon.

Born in England, he was a cousin of William Tolfrey, also a civil servant in Ceylon.

He went out to Ceylon in 1801 and filled a number of civic appointments before going home to England on leave in 1812. On his return in 1813 he became Deputy Controller-General of Customs (1813) and Commissioner of Stamps (1814) before being made Controller-General of Customs and Commissioner of Stamps (1816).

He was appointed Civil Auditor General in 1816, succeeding John D'Oyly, and held the office until 1817, when he was succeeded by John William Carrington.

In January, 1820 he was appointed Judicial Commissioner of Kandy.

He died in Kandy, Ceylon in 1821 and was buried there. He had married Mary Anne; they had at least one son and one daughter.

Legal offices
Preceded by John D'Oyly	Civil Auditor General; 1815–1817	Succeeded by John William Carrington
