= Matthias D'Oyly =

Archdeacon of Lewes (1743–1815)

Matthias D'Oyly or D'Oyley (23 November 1743 – 13 November 1815) was the Archdeacon of Lewes from 1806 until 1815.

The eldest son of Thomas D'Oyley, prebendary of Ely Cathedral, he was educated at Westminster School and Corpus Christi College, Cambridge. In 1766 he was elected Fellow of St John's College, Cambridge. He became vicar of Pevensey in 1767, and rector of Buxted in Surrey.

His sons were Sir John D'Oyly, 1st Baronet, of Kandy, who became Auditor General of Ceylon and Resident of Kandy; and Lieutenant-Colonel Sir Francis D'Oyly who was killed in the Battle of Waterloo.

Church of England titles
| Preceded by John Courtail | Archdeacon of Lewes; 1806–1815 | Succeeded by Edward Robert Raynes |
