= National People's Movement (Sri Lanka) =

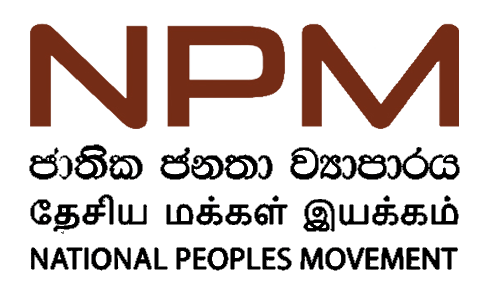
- Formation: 18 December 2018
- Type: Non-governmental organization
- Headquarters: Colombo, Sri Lanka
- Leader: Vinya Ariyaratne
- Website: www.npm.lk

The National People's Movement (NPM; Sinhala: ජාතික ජනතා ව්‍යාපාරය, Tamil: தேசிய மக்கள் இயக்கம்) is a non-governmental political organisation established on 18 December 2018 following the merger of the Deshodaya and United Professionals Movement, along with 17 other civil society groups composed of intellectuals, professionals, teachers, entrepreneurs, youth leaders and village communities.

On 29 September 2019, the NPM endorsed former Commander of the Sri Lanka Army Mahesh Senanayake as their candidate in the 2019 Sri Lankan presidential election.

== Partners ==
The National People's Movement consists of the following organizations:

- Deshodaya
- United Professionals Movement
- Lawyers for Equal Rights
- Sri Lankan Engineers Association
- Trustees (Gte.) Ltd
- Jathika Janatha Commission
- Jathika Parisarika Sanvidana Ekamuthuwa
- Alliance for Political Conscience
- Paramparika Ha Deshiya Waidyawarunge Ekamuthuwa
- Jathika Guru Balaya
- Udara Sri Lanka Organisation
- Independent Organisation to Protect Depositors
- Mihithala Mithuro Environment Development Foundation
- Janatha Niyojanaye Purogami Sabhawa
- AI Imam Shafi Centre for Education and Development
- Dambulu Govijana Vyaparaya

== Key members ==
- Vinya Ariyaratne
- Gamini Nanda Gunawardana
- Gamini Wijesinghe
- Dr. Ajith Kolonne
- Mahesh Senanayake
- Dr. Dayan Rajapakse
- Sarath Chandrasiri Mayadunne
- Kamal Addararachchi
