= D. R. Settinayake =

32nd Auditor General of Ceylon
- In office 15 August 1969 – 11 October 1971
- Preceded by: B. L. W. Fernando
- Succeeded by: P. M. W. Wijayasuriya

D. R. Settinayake was the 32nd Auditor General of Ceylon. He was appointed on 15 August 1969, succeeding B. L. W. Fernando, and held the office until 11 October 1971. He was succeeded by P. M. W. Wijayasuriya.

Legal offices
Preceded by B. L. W. Fernando	Auditor General of Ceylon; 1969–1971	Succeeded by P. M. W. Wijayasuriya
