= Samudika Jayarathna =

Auditor General of Sri Lanka since 2026

42nd Auditor General of Sri Lanka
- Incumbent
- Assumed office 5 February 2026
- Preceded by: Chulantha Wickramaratne

Personal details
- Born: L. Samudika Iroshani Jayaratne
- Education: University of Sri Jayewardenepura (BCom (Sp.), MBA)
- Profession: Civil servant

L. Samudika Iroshani Jayarathna is a Sri Lankan civil servant who has served as the 42nd Auditor General of Sri Lanka since 5 February 2026. She is the first woman to hold the position.

== Career ==
Jayaratne is a chartered accountant. She holds a Bachelor of Commerce (Special) degree and a Master of Business Administration degree from the University of Sri Jayewardenepura. She joined the National Audit Office in 2003 and served as senior deputy auditor general.

On 3 February 2026, she was appointed Auditor General by President Anura Kumara Dissanayake with the consent of the Constitutional Council and succeeded Chulantha Wickramaratne, who retired on 8 April 2025.

Jayaratne assumed duties on 5 February 2026. In accordance with Section 9 of the National Audit Act, No. 19 of 2018, she took the oath of secrecy in her capacity as auditor general of the National Audit Office and chairperson of the Audit Service Commission before the speaker of Parliament, Jagath Wickramaratne.

Legal offices
Preceded by Chulantha Wickramaratne	Auditor General of Sri Lanka; 2026-present	Incumbent
