= A. T. Ariyaratne =

Sri Lankan activist (1931–2024)

Sri Lankabhimanya A.T. Ariyaratne
- ඒ.ටී. ආරියරත්න
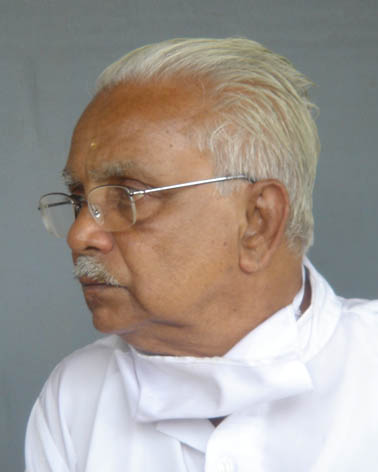
- Ariyaratne in 2004
- Born: Ahangamage Tudor Ariyaratne; 5 November 1931; Unawatuna, British Ceylon
- Died: 16 April 2024 (aged 92); Colombo, Sri Lanka
- Education: Mahinda College, Galle; Vidyodaya University
- Known for: Founder of the Sarvodaya Shramadana Movement
- Children: 6

Sri Lankabhimanya Ahangamage Tudor Ariyaratne (Sinhala: අහන්ගමගේ ටියුඩර් ආරියරත්න; 5 November 1931 – 16 April 2024) was a Sri Lankan activist, founder and president of the Sarvodaya Shramadana Movement. He was nominated to the Constitutional Council as a civil representative on 10 September 2015. He received the Jamnalal Bajaj Award in 1991.

== Early life and education ==
A.T. Ariyaratne was born on 5 November 1931 in Unawatuna village in the Galle District of Ceylon. He received his primary education at Buona Vista College, Unawatuna and then attended Mahinda College, Galle for his post primary and secondary education. After passing out from Mahinda College he joined a teachers college, after which he served as a high school teacher at Nalanda College Colombo until 1972. He earned a Bachelor of Arts degree in economics from Vidyodaya University.

== Sarvodaya Shramadana Movement ==
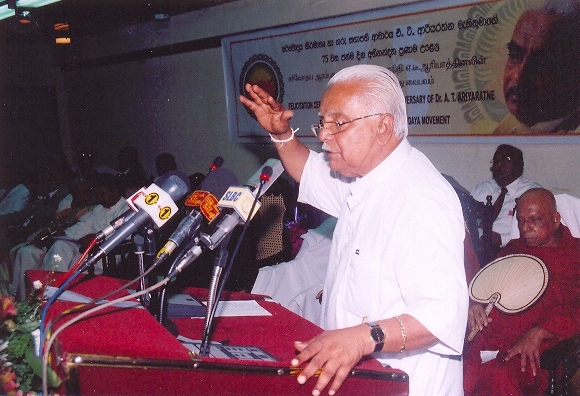
A. T. Ariyaratne addressing a gathering

Ariyaratne started his work on the Sarvodaya Shramadana Movement in 1958. Ariyaratne started this movement when he took, "forty high school students and twelve teachers from Nalanda College Colombo on "an educational experiment" to an outcaste village and helped the villagers fix it up. After many of these "educational experiments" took place and were successful, Ariyaratne and others developed ideals that have served as the basis of the Sarvodaya Movement. As a socially-engaged Buddhist movement, it contains three strands: "Gandhian ideals, Buddhist philosophy, and ecumenical spirituality." The original Sanskrit definition of Sarvodaya is "the welfare of all," but Ariyaratne has redefined the term to reflect a Buddhist ideal, "the awakening of all." The Sarvodaya movement places the people at the center of social change, "The village represents the heart of the nation and the source of its spiritual and moral vision." His movement focuses on the political empowerment of the village, Buddhist awakening, and rural development. The call of this movement has been for a non-violent spiritual revolution to replace structural violence as the basis of the social order. This spiritual revolution features the Buddhist value of non-violence it also promotes a no poverty, no affluence society.

== Ariyaratne's Buddhist Ideas ==
Ariyaratne focused on the Buddhist concepts of nonviolence, impermanence, no-self, and the Four Noble Truths. Ariyaratne used the Buddhist approach to nonviolence which "is grounded in a systematic 'attitude adjustment' in which negative, reactive states such as hatred, greed, and delusion are transformed into positive social orientations through meditative self-training." Ariyaratne used this idea of nonviolence to promote the village development that is a major part of Sarvodaya Shramadana. By helping those who are suffering from things such as poverty, one is helping to get rid of some of the violence in those lives.

Ariyaratne also uses the idea of impermanence as a basis for the Sarvodaya Shramadana Movement. This is because the "realization of the impermanence and interdependence of selves in society and nature entails the deepest respect for all." Because of the impermanence of life, it is important to overcome suffering whenever possible and by helping others overcome their suffering demonstrates the interdependence of all beings. Buddhists believe that interdependence is an important part of life and when one understands that they are dependent on others they can begin to see why it is important to help those who are suffering even if you may not be. The help that one can do through the Sarvodaya Shramadana Movement can help do this and is one of the aims of the movement as a whole.

Another Buddhist concept that Ariyaratne focuses on with the Sarvodaya Shramadana Movement is the idea of no-self. This is emphasised to Sarvodaya members because they "see this selfless service to others as a way of changing their own consciousness into a more awakened and compassionate state on the way to Nirvana." Ariyaratne argues that the idea of no-self is brought out through the service that is done through Sarvodaya Shramadana. The people that volunteer to become members of the movement are doing so out of their own compassion because it is not something that they are required to do. This means that they are giving up their own time to serve others which goes along with the Buddhist concept of no-self.

Ariyaratne reinterprets the Four Noble Truths. The First Noble Truth is suffering which means that one needs to recognise that suffering occurs throughout the world. The Sarvodaya Shramadana Movement reinterprets this to mean that "villagers should recognize problems such as poverty, disease, oppression, and disunity in their environment." Ariyaratne argues that these things are types of sufferings that occur throughout Sri Lanka and the rest of the world. It is important for all people to recognise that these sufferings exist and they should be addressed by those who have the ability to help with the suffering on both an individual level as well as with the community as a whole.

The Second Noble Truth is the origin of suffering which means one needs to understand where the suffering throughout the world is coming from. Ariyaratne reinterprets this to mean "the decadent condition of the village has one or more causes. Sarvodaya teaches that the causes lie in factors such as egoism, competition, greed, and hatred." These causes point to the things that the Sarvodaya Shramadana Movement is trying to overcome with its programs on both an individual level and for the community as a whole. Ariyaratne feels that egoism, competition, greed, and hatred cause much of the suffering in the world and should be combated and can be combated by social action programs such as the ones formed by the Sarvodaya Shramadana Movement. They need to be removed from the individual person so that these qualities are no longer one's own qualities.

The Third Noble Truth is cessation, or the end of suffering, which means that one needs to understand that suffering can be ended through achieving Nirvana. The Sarvodaya Shramadana Movement reinterprets this to mean "the villagers' suffering can cease." Ariyaratne feels that since one's personal sufferings can end with this Buddhist concept the sufferings of each individual villagers' suffering can also end through the help of other people. The Sarvodaya Shramadana Movement seeks to do this by helping villagers rebuild their lives and form a strong community bond that is based on helping one another.

The Fourth Noble Truth means that the end of this suffering can be attained by Eightfold Path to Nirvana. The Eightfold Path includes right view, right intention, right speech, right action, right livelihood, right effort, right mindfulness, and right concentration. Ariyaratne reinterprets this to mean that each part of the Eightfold Path can be applied to the restoration of the people. For example, in the case of right mindfulness, Sarvodaya Shramadana interprets this to mean that one needs to "stay open and alert to the needs of the village." This means that if one sees something that needs to be done throughout the community such as with bathrooms, water, or roads then one should attend to those needs. Doing so will help each person in the community and help relieve some form of their suffering.

== Buddhist Economics ==
Ariyaratne has been characterised by some as a Buddhist modernist for his reinterpretation or reapplication of Buddhist principles to fit his social action work. His modernism can be seen in his call for Buddhist monks and laity alike to be active in village life. The village is central to Ariyaratne's solution to Sri Lanka's troubles. Ariyaratne sees his idealised version of ancient Sri Lankan villages as the center of the social order.

Ariyaratne focuses on economic solutions through application of Buddhist principles which he calls "Buddhist Economics." In one of his lectures he states, "The economic life of a human being cannot be separated from his total life and living. Buddha Dhamma looks at life as a whole. In fact the entire world is treated as a whole in Buddha’s teachings. Without this holistic understanding of life it is difficult for humans to follow the path of happiness, He showed. Economics is only a fragment of life and living. Therefore moral and social implications of economic activity cannot be considered apart from economics." Ariyaratne often critiques consumerism, capitalism, and the rising divide between the rich and the poor. With a modernist global view, Ariyaratne often criticises the west and international organisations such as the World Bank. He states that the West has created "large-scale methods and systems, created by man and capable of dominating man, in place of simple social, economic, and political institutions which man could dominate." Ariyaratne believes that through grassroots efforts directed by Buddhism these problems can be overcome.

A central part of his social action agenda is non-violence. Ariyaratne calls for non-violent action. He has been actively working for peace in Sri Lanka for many decades, and has stated that the only way to peace is through "the dispelling of the view of 'I and mine' or the shedding of 'self' and the realization of the true doctrines of the interconnection between all animal species and the unity of all humanity," thus advocating social action in Buddhist terms. He stated in one of his lectures, "When we work towards the welfare of all the means we use have to be based on Truth, Non-violence and Selflessness in conformity with Awakening of All.". What Ariyaratne advocates is losing the self in the service of others and attempting to bring others to awakening. Ariyaratne has stated, "I cannot awaken myself unless I help awaken others.".

== Honours and awards ==
Ariyaratne, a strong believer in Gandhian principles of non-violence, rural development and self-sacrifice, shaped the Sarvodaya Movement in ways that forged a significant link between secular principles of development and Buddhist ideals of selflessness and compassion. As a devout Buddhist, he led tens of thousands of "family gatherings" and meditations with millions of people throughout Sri Lanka and other parts of the world. When he received the Hubert H. Humphrey International Humanitarian Award from the University of Minnesota's Hubert H. Humphrey School of Public Affairs in 1994, Patrick Mendis described his former mentor as the "Gandhi of Sri Lanka."

Naitional honours

- Sri Lankabhimanya – highest National Honour of Sri Lanka in 2006.
- Deshabandu – first to be awarded the national honour by the Government of Sri Lanka in 1986.

International awards

- Ramon Magsaysay Award for Community Leadership in 1969
- Niwano Peace Prize in 1992
- Gandhi Peace Prize from the government of India in 1996
- Acharya Sushil Kumar International Peace Award in 2005

Honorary doctorates

- Vidyodaya University – D.Litt.
- Emilio Aguinaldo College, Philippines – honorary doctorate of humanities

== Personal life and death ==
Ariyaratne was married to Neetha, and had six children: Vinya Ariyaratne, Charika, Jeevan, Sadee, Diyath and Nimna. He also had 12 grandchildren: Janatha Marasinghe, Damni Marasinghe, Hasala Ariyaratne, Aseni Ariyaratne, Jithvan Ariyaratne, Kanishtaa Ariyaratne, Tiara Ganegama, Sanara De Silva, Niven Ganegama, Liana Ariyaratne, Sanchit De Silva and Diyana Ariyaratne.

Ariyaratne died at a private hospital in Colombo, on 16 April 2024, at the age of 92.

== See also ==
- Ahimsa
- Gandhism
- Sarvodaya

== Bibliography ==
Bibliography:

- Ariyaratne, A. T. "A. T. Ariyaratne: Collected Works Volume 1". Netherlands, 1978.
- Ariyaratne, A. T. "Buddhist Economics in Practice in the Sarvodaya Shramadana Movement of Sri Lanka". New York: Sarvodaya Support Group, 1999.
- Ariyaratne, A. T. "Religious Path to Peace and Building a Just World". Sarvodaya P, 1984.
- Ariyaratne, A.T. "Schumacher lectures on Buddhist economics". Ratmalana: Sarvodaya Vishva Lekha, 1999.

Works on Ariyaratne:

- Bond, George. "Buddhism at Work: Community Development, Social Empowerment and the Sarvodaya Movement". Kumarian P, 2003.
- "Fifty key thinkers on development". New York: Routledge, 2006.
- Liyanage, Gunadasa. "Revolution under the breadfruit tree: The story of Sarvodaya Shramadana Movement and its founder Dr. A.T. Ariyaratne". Sinha, 1988.
