= 67th (South Hampshire) Regiment of Foot =

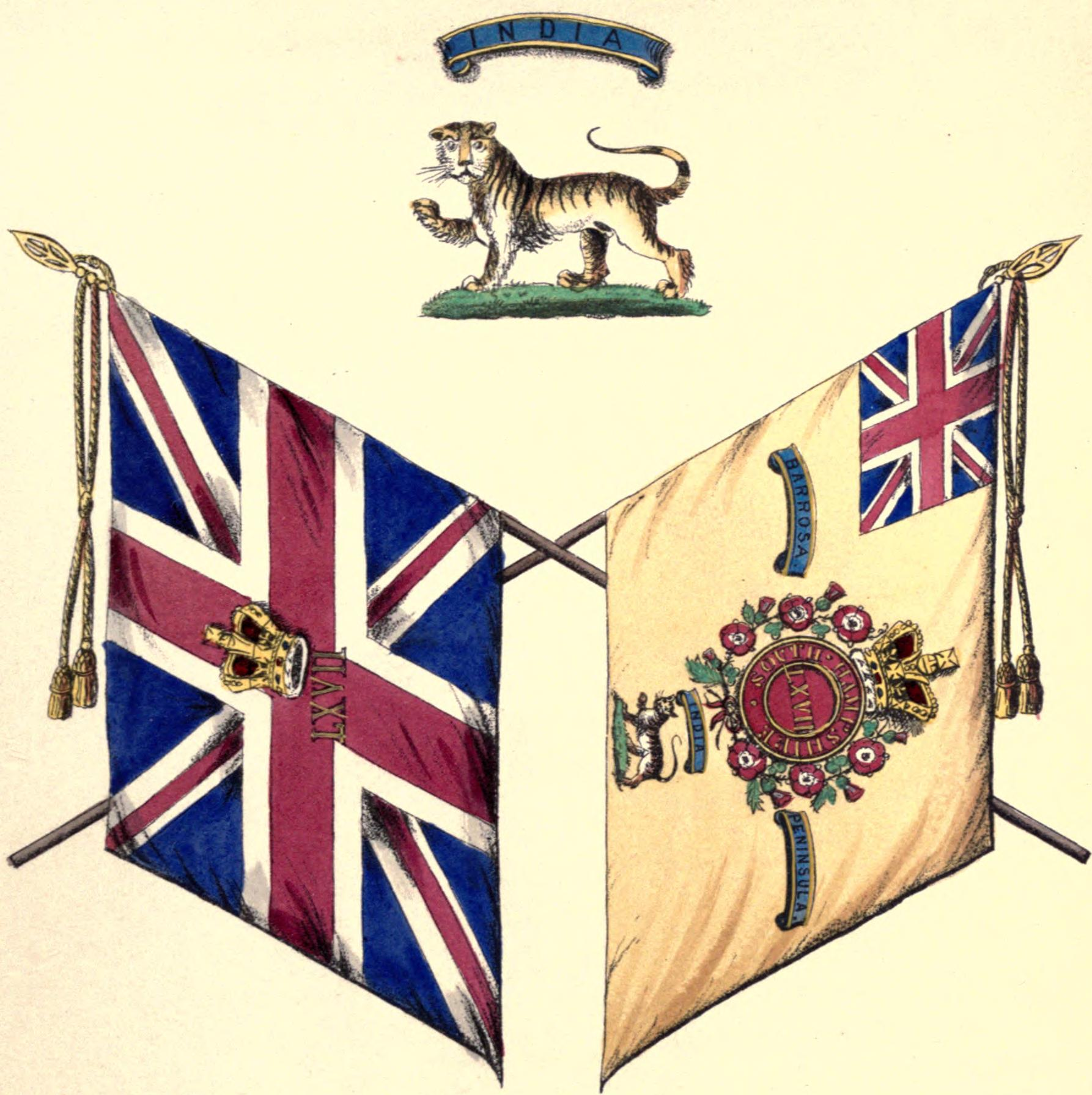
- Colours of the 67th Regiment
- Active: 10 December 1756–1 July 1881
- Country: Kingdom of Great Britain (1756–1800); United Kingdom (1801–1881)
- Branch: British Army
- Type: Line infantry
- Size: One battalion (two battalions 1803–1817)
- Garrison/HQ: Lower Barracks, Winchester
- Colors: Facings: Pale yellow
- Engagements: Napoleonic Wars; Second Opium War; Second Anglo-Afghan War

The 67th (South Hampshire) Regiment of Foot was a line infantry regiment of the British Army, raised in 1756. Under the Childers Reforms it amalgamated with the 37th (North Hampshire) Regiment of Foot to form the Hampshire Regiment (later the Royal Hampshire Regiment) in 1881.

== History ==
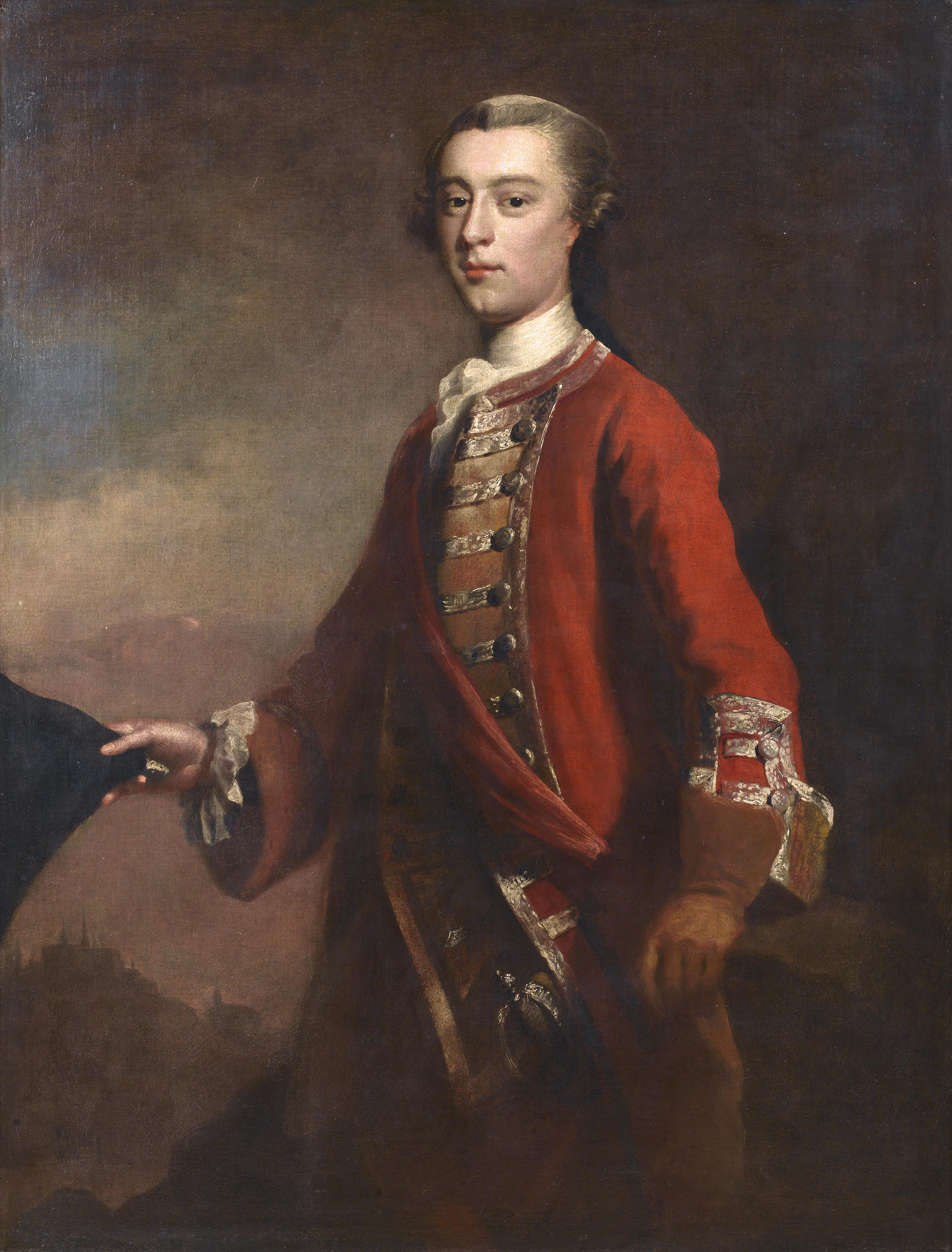
James Wolfe, the regiment's first colonel

=== Formation ===
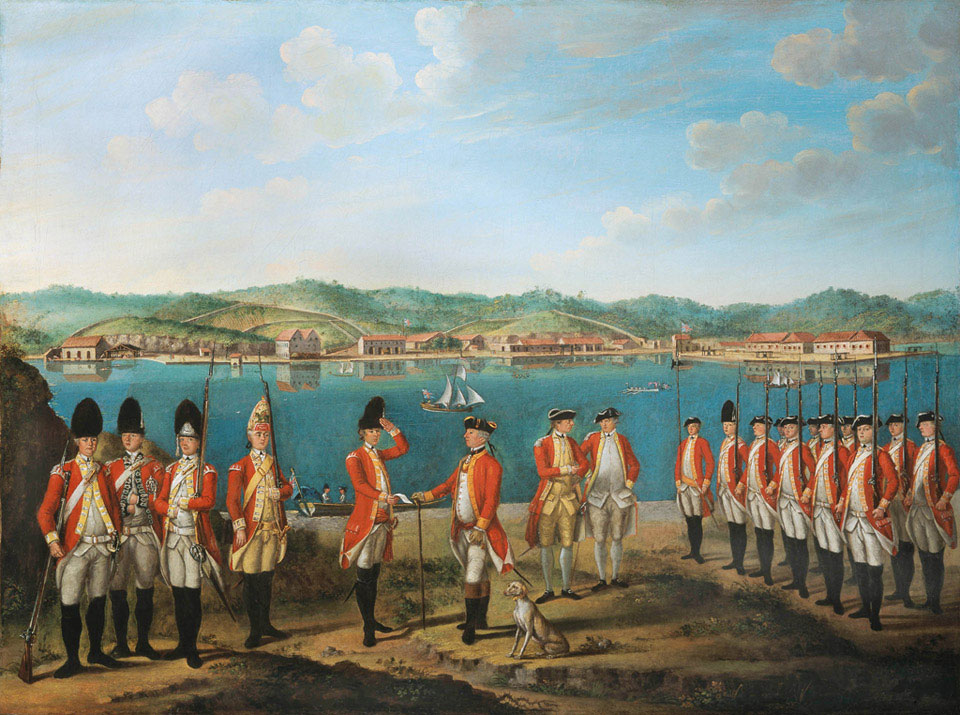
c. 1771 painting of a regimental grenadier (third from left) in Minorca

The formation of the regiment was prompted by the expansion of the army as a result of the commencement of the Seven Years' War. On 25 August 1756 it was ordered that a number of existing regiments should raise a second battalion; among those chosen was the 20th Regiment of Foot. The 2nd Battalion of the 20th Regiment of Foot was formed on 10 December 1756 and renumbered as the 67th Regiment of Foot on 21 April 1758. In spring 1761 the regiment formed part of a force that successfully captured Belle Île. It embarked for Portugal in 1762 and moved on to Menorca in 1763. After returning home in 1771, it was posted to Ireland in 1775. In 1782 the regiment took a county title as the 67th (South Hampshire) Regiment of Foot.

In 1785 the regiment was posted to the West Indies: it arrived at Barbados and then moved to Antigua in autumn 1785. It moved to Grenada in 1788 and returned to Barbados in 1793 before travelling home in 1794.

=== Napoleonic Wars ===
The regiment returned to the West Indies in 1795 and helped put down a rebellion in Saint-Domingue in 1796. It moved to Jamaica in 1798 and then with numbers depleted by disease returned to England in 1801. In July 1803 a second battalion was raised. The 1st battalion embarked for India in April 1805 and took part in the closing stages of the siege of Ryghur in May 1818 and most of the siege of Asirgarh in March 1819 during the Third Anglo-Maratha War.

Meanwhile, the 2nd battalion embarked for Portugal in November 1810 for service in the Peninsular War and fought at the Battle of Barrosa in March 1811 and the siege of Tarragona in June 1813 before taking part in operations on the East coast of Spain in the closing stages of the War. The battalions were amalgamated again in May 1817.

=== The Victorian era ===
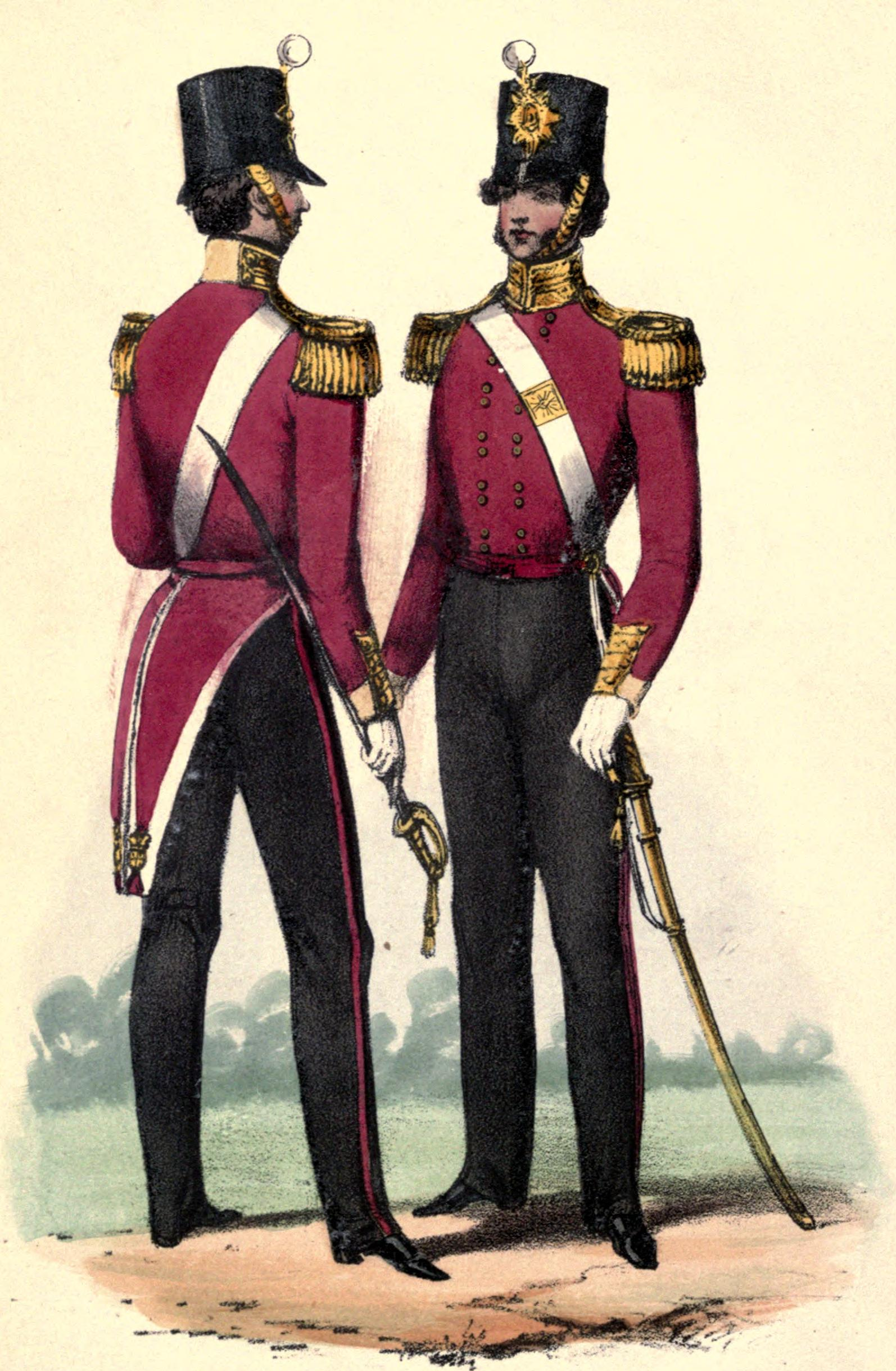
The regimental uniform in 1849

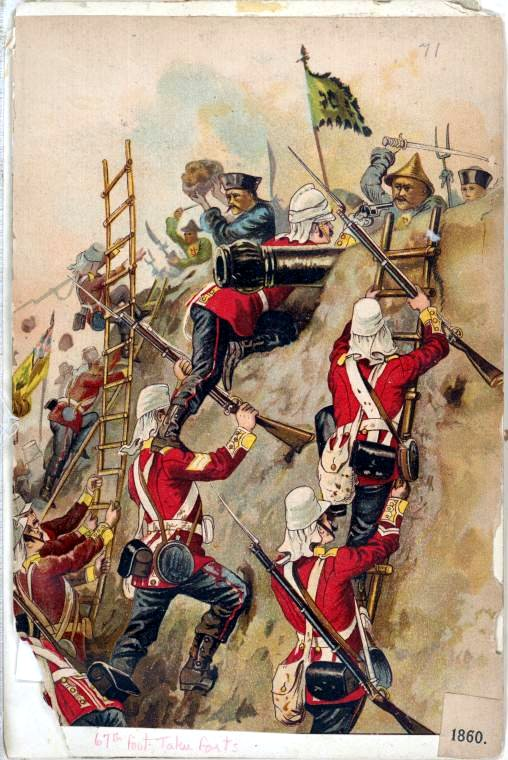
The regiment at the Battle of the Taku Forts

The regiment returned from India in November 1826. It embarked for Gibraltar in 1832 and moved on to the West Indies in 1833: it was initially based at Saint Kitts but moved to Demerara in 1837 and to Barbados in 1839 before returning home in 1840. It embarked for India in 1858 and them moved on the China in 1860 for service in the Second Opium War. It saw action in the Battle of the Taku Forts in August 1860 and the Battle of Palikao in September 1860 before taking part in the capture of Peking later that month. The regiment moved to Japan in 1864 and to South Africa in 1865 before returning home in 1866.

The regiment was posted to Burma in 1872. From there it moved to Afghanistan for service in the Second Anglo-Afghan War in 1878. It fought at the Battle of Charasiab in October 1879 and the siege of the Sherpur Cantonment in December 1879 before returning to India in 1881.

As part of the Cardwell Reforms of the 1870s, where single-battalion regiments were linked together to share a single depot and recruiting district in the United Kingdom, the 67th was linked with the 37th (North Hampshire) Regiment of Foot, and assigned to district no. 40 at Lower Barracks in Winchester. On 1 July 1881 the Childers Reforms came into effect and the regiment amalgamated with the 37th (North Hampshire) Regiment of Foot to form the Hampshire Regiment (later the Royal Hampshire Regiment).

== Battle honours ==
Battle honours won by the regiment were:

- Peninsular War: Barrosa, Peninsula
- India
- Second China War: Taku Forts, Pekin 1860
- Second Anglo-Afghan War: Charasiah, Kabul 1879, Afghanistan 1878–80

== Recipients of the Victoria Cross ==
- Lieutenant Nathaniel Burslem Second China War 1860
- Ensign John Worthy Chaplin Second China War 1860
- Hospital Apprentice Andrew Fitzgibbon Second China War 1860
- Private Thomas Lane Second China War 1860
- Lieutenant Edmund Henry Lenon Second China War 1860

== Colonels of the Regiment ==
Colonels of the Regiment were:

=== 67th Regiment of Foot ===
- 1758–1759: Maj-Gen. James Wolfe
- 1759–1760: F.M. Lord Frederick Cavendish
- 1760–1761: Lt-Gen. Sir Henry Erskine, 5th Baronet
- 1761–1774: Lt-Gen. Hamilton Lambert
- 1774–1803: Gen. Edward Maxwell Browne

=== 67th (the South Hampshire) Regiment of Foot - (1782) ===
- 1803: Lt-Gen. Francis D'Oyly
- 1803–1811: Gen. Peter Craig
- 1811–1828: Gen. Sir William Keppel, GCB
- 1828–1844: Lt-Gen. Sir John Macdonald, GCB
- 1844–1852: Lt-Gen. John Clitheroe
- 1852–1854: Lt-Gen. John Frederick Ewart, CB
- 1854–1858: F.M. Sir Colin Campbell, 1st Baron Clyde, GCB, KCSI
- 1858–1874: Gen. Francis John Davies
- 1874–1877: Gen. Henry Phipps Raymond
- 1877–1881: Gen. William Mark Wood

== Sources ==
- Cannon, Richard (1849). Historical Record of the Sixty-Seventh, or the South Hampshire Regiment. London: Parker, Furnivall and Parker.
