= L. A. Weerasinghe =

Lionel Arthur Weerasinghe

29th Auditor General of Ceylon
- In office 2 March 1953 – 14 September 1963
- Preceded by: E. Allen Smith
- Succeeded by: D. S. De Silva

Lionel Arthur Weerasinghe was the 29th Auditor General of Ceylon. He was appointed on 2 March 1953, succeeding E. Allen Smith, and held the office until 14 September 1963. He was succeeded by D. S. De Silva.

Legal offices
Preceded by E. Allen Smith	Auditor General of Ceylon; 1953–1963	Succeeded by D. S. De Silva
