= Bernard Senior =

Colonial Auditor of Ceylon

23rd Colonial Auditor
- In office 1 March 1907 – 8 April 1909
- Preceded by: Francis Robert Ellis
- Succeeded by: D. S. MacGregor

Personal details
- Born: 23 June 1865 Merton, Surrey, UK
- Died: 3 July 1934 (aged 69) Kintbury, Berkshire, UK

Bernard Senior CMG ISO (23 June 1865 – 3 July 1934) was the 23rd Colonial Auditor of British Ceylon.

He was born the son of J. Senior, a solicitor of Merton, Surrey and educated at Dulwich College.

In 1884 he was appointed clerk to the Boundary Commission, attached to the Scottish Education Department the following year and then served for a period as private secretary to Sir Francis Sandford (later Lord Sandford), Under-Secretary for Scotland from 1887 to 1888.

In 1888 he was appointed first-class clerk to the Colonial Secretary's office in the Gold Coast and local auditor at Lagos in 1889. He went to British Bechuanaland in 1894 and to Cyprus in 1895. In September 1902 he was appointed Auditor-General of the Orange River Colony. Other posts he held in South Africa were chairman of the Tender Board and director of the National Bank of the Orange River Colony. He was awarded the Imperial Service Order (ISO) in the 1906 Birthday Honours list on 29 June 1906.

He moved to Ceylon as Colonial Auditor on 1 March 1907, succeeding Francis Robert Ellis, and held the office until 8 April 1909, when he was succeeded by D. S. MacGregor. He was then appointed Treasurer and Commissioner of Stamps of Ceylon, retiring to England in 1922, where he died in 1934. He was awarded CMG in the 1916 New Year Honours.

Senior married twice; firstly in 1891 Florence May Farr; and secondly in 1916 Marguerite Sara Wentworth-Stanley.

Legal offices
Preceded by	Auditor-General of the Orange River Colony; 1902–1907	Succeeded by
Preceded by Francis Robert Ellis	Colonial Auditor; 1907–1909	Succeeded by D. S. MacGregor
