= W. Gamini Epa =

34th Auditor General of Sri Lanka
- In office 2 May 1983 – 26 January 1993
- Preceded by: P. M. W. Wijayasuriya
- Succeeded by: S. M. Sabry

W. Gamini Epa was the 34th Auditor General of Sri Lanka. He was appointed on 2 May 1983, succeeding P. M. W. Wijayasuriya, and held the office until 26 January 1993. He was succeeded by S. M. Sabry.

Legal offices
Preceded by P. M. W. Wijayasuriya	Auditor General of Sri Lanka; 1983–1993	Succeeded by S. M. Sabry
