= D. S. De Silva =

30th Auditor General of Ceylon
- In office 14 September 1963 – 21 February 1964
- Preceded by: L. A. Weerasinghe
- Succeeded by: B. L. W. Fernando

D. S. De Silva was the 30th Auditor General of Ceylon. He was appointed on 14 September 1963, succeeding L. A. Weerasinghe, and held the office until 21 February 1964. He was succeeded by B. L. W. Fernando.

Legal offices
Preceded by L. A. Weerasinghe	Auditor General of Ceylon; 1963–1964	Succeeded by B. L. W. Fernando
