= D. S. MacGregor =

24th Colonial Auditor
- In office 8 April 1909 – 27 May 1914
- Preceded by: Bernard Senior
- Succeeded by: Wilfrid Wentworth Woods

D. S. MacGregor was the 24th Colonial Auditor of Ceylon. He was appointed on 8 April 1909, succeeding Bernard Senior, and held the office until 27 May 1914. He was succeeded by Wilfrid Wentworth Woods.

Legal offices
Preceded by Bernard Senior	Colonial Auditor; 1909–1914	Succeeded by Wilfrid Wentworth Woods
