= Sarath Chandrasiri Mayadunne =

Sri Lankan politician

Hon. Sarath Chandrasiri Mayadunne
- සරත් චන්ද්‍රසිරි මායාදුන්නේ

36th Auditor General of Sri Lanka
- In office 13 August 2000 – 23 October 2006
- Preceded by: S. M. Sabry
- Succeeded by: P. A. Pematilaka

Member of Parliament for the National List
- In office 1 September 2015 – 3 September 2015
- Succeeded by: Bimal Rathnayaka

Personal details
- Party: Janatha Vimukthi Peramuna
- Education: University of Ceylon

Sarath Chandrasiri Mayadunne (Sinhala: සරත් චන්ද්‍රසිරි මායාදුන්නේ) is a Sri Lankan civil servant and politician. He was the 36th Auditor General of Sri Lanka and was appointed to the Parliament of Sri Lanka in 2015.

Mayadunne attended Kegalu Vidyalaya. Graduating from University of Ceylon, Peradeniya with a Bachelor of Commerce in 1970, he became a Chartered Accountant. He is a Fellow of the Canadian Comprehensive Auditing Foundation.

Joining the Auditor-General's Department, he was appointed Auditor General on 13 August 2000, succeeding S. M. Sabry, and held the office until his retirement from public service on 23 October 2006. He was succeeded by P. A. Pematilaka.

He was listed by the Janatha Vimukthi Peramuna as a national list candidate at the 2015 general election. Following the election Mayadunne was appointed to Parliament as a national list Member of Parliament taking oaths on 1 September 2015, however he resigned two days later on 3 September 2015. Bimal Rathnayake succeeded Mayadunne.

Legal offices
| Preceded by S. M. Sabry | Auditor General of Sri Lanka; 2000–2006 | Succeeded by P. A. Pematilaka |
