= E. Allen Smith =

British Ceylonese civil servant

Ernest Allen Smith CBE

28th Auditor General of Ceylon
- In office 16 February 1946 – 2 March 1953
- Preceded by: Oliver Ernest Goonetilleke
- Succeeded by: L. A. Weerasinghe

Ernest Allen Smith CBE was the 28th Auditor General of Ceylon. He was appointed on 16 February 1946, succeeding Oliver Ernest Goonetilleke, and held the office until 2 March 1953. He was succeeded by L. A. Weerasinghe.

He was appointed a Commander of the Order of the British Empire in the 1946 Birthday Honours.

Legal offices
Preceded by Oliver Ernest Goonetilleke	Auditor General of Ceylon; 1946–1953	Succeeded by L. A. Weerasinghe
