= Gamini Wijesinghe =

40th Auditor General of Sri Lanka
- In office 27 November 2015 – April 2019
- Preceded by: H. A. S. Samaraweera
- Succeeded by: Chulantha Wickramaratne

Personal details
- Education: University of Sri Jayewardenepura; Kyung Hee University

H. M. Gamini Wijesinghe was the 40th Auditor General of Sri Lanka. He was appointed on 27 November 2015, succeeding H. A. S. Samaraweera and served until April 2019. He previously held the office of Director General of the Sri Lanka Accounting and Auditing Standers Monitoring Board. He is a fellow of the Institute of Chartered Accountants of Sri Lanka. He started his political journey as a leadership committee member of National Peoples Movement (NPM) after retiring public service in 2019.

== Professional career ==
Mr. Wijesinghe joined with public service in 1985 in Auditors general office. He served in government sector for 34 years. He has been to South Korea for further studies where he studied at Kyung Hee University and had overseas training in Maldives.

=== Awards ===
- Ada Derana "Sri Lankan of the Year" in 2018 for public service

Legal offices
| Preceded by H. A. S. Samaraweera | Auditor General of Sri Lanka; 2015-2019 | Succeeded by Chulantha Wickramaratne |
