= Anthony Bertolacci =

6th Civil Auditor General
- In office 30 January 1811 – 1 September 1814
- Preceded by: Richard Plasket
- Succeeded by: John D'Oyly

Personal details
- Born: 1776 Corsica
- Died: 1833 (aged 56–57)

Anthony Bertolacci (1776–1833) was the sixth Civil Auditor General of British Ceylon.

A Corsican, he left Corsica with his British employers when they evacuated the island in 1796 after a short military occupation. Around 1799 he followed his patron, the Hon. Frederick North, to Ceylon as his secretary, but soon became firstly Postmaster-General and later Comptroller-General of Customs.

He became acting Civil Auditor General on 30 January 1811, succeeding Richard Plasket, and held the office until 1 September 1814, when he was succeeded by John D'Oyly.

Legal offices
Preceded by Richard Plasket	Civil Auditor General; 1811–1814	Succeeded by John D'Oyly
