= F. G. Morley =

British colonial administrator

26th Colonial Auditor
- In office 1 March 1922 – 25 June 1931
- Preceded by: Wilfrid Wentworth Woods
- Succeeded by: Oliver Ernest Goonetilleke

Personal details
- Born: Francis George Morley; 16 June 1873 West Ham, East London, England
- Died: 18 May 1955 (aged 81) Ceylon

Francis George Morley (16 June 1873 – 18 May 1955) was a British colonial administrator who served as the 26th Colonial Auditor of Sri Lanka (then known as Ceylon). He was appointed on 1 March 1922, succeeding Wilfrid Wentworth Woods, and held the office until 25 June 1931. He was succeeded by Oliver Ernest Goonetilleke.

Legal offices
Preceded by Wilfrid Wentworth Woods	Colonial Auditor; 1922–1931	Succeeded by Oliver Ernest Goonetilleke
