= Oliver Goonetilleke =

Sri Lankan statesman

His Excellency Sir Oliver Goonetilleke GCMG KCVO KBE KStJ
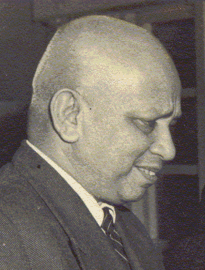

3rd Governor-General of Ceylon
- In office 17 July 1954 – 2 March 1962
- Monarch: Elizabeth II
- Prime Minister: John Kotelawala; S. W. R. D. Bandaranaike; Wijeyananda Dahanayake; Dudley Senanayake; Sirimavo Bandaranaike
- Preceded by: Herwald Ramsbotham, 1st Viscount Soulbury
- Succeeded by: William Gopallawa

Minister of Finance
- In office 14 October 1953 – 23 June 1954
- Prime Minister: John Kotelawala
- Preceded by: Junius Richard Jayewardene
- Succeeded by: M. D. H. Jayawardena

High Commissioner for Ceylon to the United Kingdom
- In office 1949–1952
- Monarch: Elizabeth II
- Prime Minister: DS Senanayake, Dudley Senanayake
- Preceded by: Office Created
- Succeeded by: Edwin Wijeyeratne

Minister of Home Affairs and Rural Development
- In office 26 September 1947 – 22 July 1948
- Prime Minister: D. S. Senanayake
- Preceded by: Post Created
- Succeeded by: Edwin Wijeyeratne

3rd Financial Secretary of Ceylon
- In office 16 February 1946 – 3 February 1947
- Preceded by: Harold James Huxham
- Succeeded by: Abolished

27th Colonial Auditor
- In office 25 June 1931 – 16 February 1946
- Preceded by: F. G. Morley
- Succeeded by: E. Allen Smith

Personal details
- Born: Oliver Ernest Goonetilleke; 20 October 1892 Trincomalee, British Ceylon
- Died: 17 December 1978 (aged 86) Colombo, Sri Lanka
- Spouse(s): Esther Goonetilleke (nee Jayawardena), Lady Phyllis Goonetilleke (nee Miller)
- Children: Joyce Wijesinghe; Shiela Sathananthan; Ernie Goonetilleke
- Profession: Accountant

Sir Oliver Ernest Goonetilleke GCMG KCVO KBE KStJ (Sinhala: ශ්‍රිමත් ඔලිවර් ගුණතිලක; 20 October 1892 – 17 December 1978) was a Sri Lankan statesman. Having served as an important figure in the gradual independence of Ceylon (now Sri Lanka) from Britain, he became the third Governor-General of Ceylon (1954–1962). He was the first Ceylonese individual to hold the vice-regal post.

== Early life and education ==
Oliver Ernest Goonetilleke was born on 20 October 1892 in Trincomalee in the northeast of Ceylon. He was the fifth child of eight and the only son of Alfred Goonetilleke and Emily Jayasekera. His father who served in the Ceylon Postal Service was the postmaster of Trincomalee at the time of his birth.

He was educated at Wesley College in Colombo where he won many prizes and scholarships including the Hill Medal and the Gogerly Scholarship. After completing his secondary education, Goonetilleke joined the teaching staff of Wesley College as an assistant teacher. He later earned a Bachelor of Arts degree from the University of London as an external student.

== Early career ==
After gaining his degree, he left his teaching post after he was passed over for a scholarship to the College of Agriculture, Pune. He joined O. B. Wijeyesekera's Bank of Colombo as a sub-accountant, which closed down a few years later following a run on the bank. He was then hired by D. R. Wijewardena as the manager of the Ceylon Daily News, which was one of two papers he owned at the time. He was an honorary lieutenant in the Ceylon Cadet Corps.

== Public service career ==
In 1921, Goonetilleke joined the government service having been appointed the Assistant Auditor for Railway in the Audit Office and was thereafter promoted as the Assistant Colonial Auditor.

=== Auditor General ===
Goonetilleke was the first Ceylonese to be appointed as Colonial Auditor of the crown colony of Ceylon on 25 June 1931. With the implementation of the Donoughmore Constitution, the title of the head of the Audit Office was changed to Auditor General of Ceylon and Goonetilleke became the first to hold the new appointment on 7 July 1931 and served in this capacity till February 1946.

As the Colonial Auditor, he was an ex-officio member of the Executive Council of Ceylon in 1931. He took on additional duties as Chairman of the Salaries and Cadres Commission, Civil Defense Commissioner and Food Commissioner. He was appointed a Companion of the Order of St Michael and St George (CMG) in the 1941 New Year Honours for services as Auditor General.

=== Civil Defence Commissioner ===
With the onset of World War II in the Far East and the likelihood that Ceylon would face a military threat from Japan, Goonetilleke was given the additional duty as Civil Defence Commissioner in the cabinet of Ceylon, heading the newly formed Civil Defence Department to undertake civil defense preparations. Some civil defence works such as knocking down buildings to create fire breaks in Colombo proved unpopular but proved to be justified when the Imperial Japanese Navy carried out air raids on Colombo and other cities in the spring of 1942. In this capacity, Ivor Jennings, Principle of the Ceylon University College, served as Goonetilleke's deputy, and the two worked closely with D. S. Senanayake, the Minister of Agriculture and Lands. This group was known as "the Breakdown Gang" as they began to talk about much besides civil defence, including the steps that might be taken to move Ceylon to complete independence after the war. He was knighted in 1944 with a KBE for his services as the Civil Defence Commissioner in the New Year Honours. However, on 18 December 1946, questions were raised in the House of Commons by Douglas Dodds-Parker on irregularities in the Auditor-General's Report on Civil Defence Expenditure for 1943–44 and 1944–45.

=== Negotiations for independence ===
In 1943, a declaration was made for a grant of government for all the matters of civil administration in Ceylon. The Senanayake, Goonetilleke and Jennings drafted a constitution, known as the "Ministers' Draft", and submitted it to the British Government in February 1944. At this time Goonetilleke who was appointed the Commissioner of Food went to Britain to discuss urgent food supplies. There he met Lord Soulbury who had been appointed to lead a Commission to Ceylon, pressing his case for self-rule. Goonetilleke was thereafter advised Senanayake on approaching the members of the Soulbury Commission when they arrived in Ceylon in December 1944. Goonetilleke became an "unofficial secretary" to the commission and significantly influenced it.

On 13 November 1947, Sir Oliver Goonetilleke and not the Prime Minister D.S. Senanayake announced at a press conference at the Galle Face Hotel around 7 pm that the 'Independence of Ceylon Act' was being introduced in the House of Commons at Westminster about the same time that evening.

=== Financial Secretary ===
With the war drawing to a close and the closure of the Civil Defence Department, Goonetilleke left his post of Colonial Auditor which he held since 1931 to take up appointment as Financial Secretary of Ceylon in February 1946. The Financial Secretary was head of the Treasury and responsible for all financial policy of the colony. As the Financial Secretary, Goonetilleke sat in the Board of Ministers. He was the first Ceylonese to hold the post of Financial Secretary. He held the position until his resignation in September 1947. He was awarded KCMG in the 1948 New Year Honours for his service as Financial Secretary, Ceylon.

== Political career ==
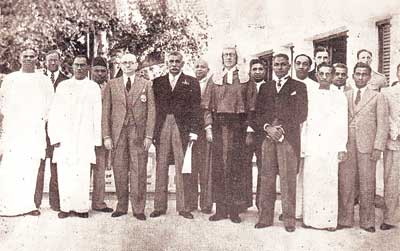
The first Cabinet of Ministers of Ceylon

=== Minister of Home Affairs and Rural Development ===
With Ceylon gaining dominion status within the British Commonwealth, in 1947 the first cabinet of ministers was formed with Senanayake as prime minister after the 1947 general elections. Goonetilleke was appointed as the Minister of Home Affairs and Rural Development on 26 September 1947. He had been appointed to the newly formed upper house of parliament, the Senate of Ceylon and became the Leader of the Senate when both houses were ceremonially opened by the Duke of Gloucester, marking the independence of Ceylon on 4 February 1948. His term as a Cabinet Minister did not last long as he resigned as Minister and Senator on 22 July 1948, and was succeeded by Edwin Wijeyeratne.

=== High Commissioner to the United Kingdom ===
Goonetilleke was thereafter appointed the first Ceylonese High Commissioner to the United Kingdom and served till February 1951.

=== Minister of Home Affairs and Rural Development ===
He returned to Ceylon in early 1951, to resume his cabinet position as Minister of Home Affairs and Rural Development and Leader of the Senate in March 1951 succeeding Edwin Wijeyeratne and served till April 1952.

=== Minister of Finance ===
Following the Prime Minister Dudley Senanayake's resignation after the Hartal 1953, Sir John Kotelawala succeeded him. Goonetilleke was appointed by Kotelawala to his cabinet as Ministry of Finance and the Treasury on 14 October 1953, while holding the post of Leader of the Senate. Once again his ministerial tenure was brief, lasting only till June 1954. During this time he served as the Minister in Attendance to the Queen during her Royal visit to Ceylon.

== Governor-General ==
Shortly after a visit by Queen Elizabeth II to Ceylon in April 1954, the decision was taken to appoint a Ceylonese native to the post of Governor-General, succeeding Lord Soulbury. D. S. Senanayake had died in 1952, and Colonel Sir John Kotalawela was Prime Minister when Goonetilleke succeeded to the position and took up residence in Queen's House. He was a friend of the powerful philanthropist Sir Ernest de Silva who assisted him in the ascension to Governor-General.

He remained in office after the election of the left-wing S. W. R. D. Bandaranaike as prime minister defeating Sir John Kotalawela in the 1956 general elections. Bandaranaike was pressured to remove Goonetilleke and reduce the pay of the Governor-General by members of his left-wing coalition.

=== 1958 communal riots ===
On 24 May 1958 Communal riots erupted, and Prime Minister Bandaranaike did not make a formal response. With violence spreading throughout the island, Goonetilleke declared a state of emergency on 27 May 1958 and deployed the armed forces to quell the rioting, while Bandaranaike allowed Goonetilleke to take control of the situation and issue orders to the armed forces to suppress the rioting with force. Goonetilleke authorized the armed forces to shoot rioters, and the armed forces restored order in a few days.

=== Bandaranaike assassination ===
Goonetilleke once again was forced to take decisive action, on 25 September 1959 when Prime Minister Bandaranaike was shot at his home at Rosmead Place while meeting the public. Goonetilleke was at Queens House accepting letters of credence of the Italian Ambassador Count Paolo di Michelis di Sloughhello, when he was informed about the assassination attempt he stopped the ceremony and rushed to Rosmead Place. He informed parliament to continue and at 11 AM declared a state of emergency, bringing the military to full readiness and mobilizing reservists. Bandaranaike, who was rushed to hospital and into emergency surgery, died twenty-two hours after he was shot.

Bandaranaike had been scheduled to go to New York to attend the UN General Assembly in late September 1959. The Leader of the House C. P. de Silva was in London undergoing treatment and Bandaranaike had sent a letter to the Governor General recommending that he appoint Wijeyananda Dahanayake, Minister of Education as acting prime minister during his absence. With this letter present, Goonetilleke appointed Dahanayake as prime minister on September 26, 1959, and was later confirmed by Parliament.

=== Political turmoil ===
Following the assassination of Bandaranaike, the country faced a period of political instability. The Premiership of Dahanayake lasted only one year, and during that time many changes to his cabinet took place. Fresh elections were called, but the elections in March 1960 were indecisive in their outcome, as Dudley Senanayake formed a government for a brief period. Goonetilleke had a difficult decision when faced with the classic difficulty for a Governor-General, whether to dissolve Parliament, causing a new election, or call on a different faction to form a government when the Prime Minister (in this case Dudley Senanayake, son of his old friend) lost Parliament's confidence. In the event, he dissolved the parliament and called for fresh elections. He briefly held the portfolio of Minister of Finance from 21 March 1960 to 23 April 1960.

Bandaranaike's widow Sirima Bandaranaike was selected by his party, the Sri Lanka Freedom Party as its leader and won elections in July 1960. Goonetilleke called on Bandaranaike to form a government, and thus she became the world's first female prime minister.

=== 1962 attempted military coup ===
In January 1962, information surfaced of an attempted military coup against the government of Mrs Bandaranaike. Felix Dias Bandaranaike, Parliamentary Secretary for Defence and External Affairs (and the Prime Minister's nephew), stated in Parliament on 18 February that Goonetilleke had been cited in the investigations as having been involved in the conspiracy. Goonetilleke, while denying that he had played any such role, indicated that he had no objection to being questioned by the police. But this was not enough for Mrs Bandaranaike, who was determined to force him out of office if she could. Bradman Weerakoon, the Prime Minister's secretary, was dispatched to London in person, there to convey to the Queen that Mrs Bandaranaike's request that a new Governor-General be appointed. On 26 February, Radio Ceylon announced that the Queen had accepted the Prime Minister's recommendation that William Gopallawa be made the new Governor-General, his term to take effect on 20 March. Gopallawa was Mrs Bandaranaike's uncle, and she hoped that he would be more subservient to her than Goonetilleke had ever been. Meanwhile, Goonetilleke quietly vacated Queen's House on 2 March and afterwards left the country. His tenure had lasted eight years and had included five prime ministers.

== Later life ==
Goonetilleke settled into a retired life in London, in a self-imposed exile. In the investigation into the attempted military coup, some of the crown witnesses tried to link him and former Prime Ministers, Dudley Senanayake and Colonel Sir John Kotelawala, with the conspiracy; this was never proven.

In his retirement in London, Sir Oliver with his considerable accumulated wealth became an underwriting member of Lloyd's of London and moved in the social circles of the day. He was also an avid horse racing enthusiast and horse owner with his horses racing at Epsom and Ascot. He was a steward at both the Ceylon Turf Club and the Galle Gymkhana Club. In 1964, he was accused by Philip Gunawardena of moves against the Bandaranaike government. Goonetilleke also faced many accusations of exchange fraud, for taking considerable sums of money out from Ceylon.

=== Exchange control offences conviction ===
In 1972, he was tried in absentia and sentenced to four years of rigorous imprisonment and a fine of Rs 950,000 ($125,000) for exchange control offences by the Criminal Justice Commission. He was not extradited, his daughter Sheila Sathananthan was given a two‐year suspended sentence and fined $72,000 and her husband Coomaraswany Sathananthan was jailed for two years and fined $35,000.

Following the defeat of Bandaranaike in the 1977 general election, the newly elected Prime Minister J. R. Jayewardene, repealed the Criminal Justice Commissions Act and released all who were jailed under the provisions of the Act with an amnesty declared. This allowed Goonetilleke to return to Sri Lanka, where he died after a brief illness in 1978.

== Legacy ==
A statue of Goonetilleke was erected by members of the public at Kanatte crossroads in Borella. The Government of Sri Lanka issued a commemorative stamp in 1982, to mark the 4th death anniversary of Sir Oliver Goonetilleke. A biography under the title 'OEG' was written by Charles Joseph Jeffries, and memorials to Goonetilleke include a six-foot bronze statue by sculptor Tissa Ranasinghe, commissioned by his family and installed in 1967 at a major roundabout in Colombo.

== Personal life ==
Oliver Goonetilleke first married Esther (née Jayawardena), sister of Brigadier Christopher Allan Hector Perera Jayawardena. They had three children, Joyce Wijesinghe, Shiela Sathananthan and Ernie Goonetilleke. Esther Goonetilleke died of an illness when the three children were very young and before Goonetilleke entered the civil service. During his self-imposed exile in London, Goonetilleke married Phyllis Miller, who was the secretary of the Soulbury Commission, whom he had befriended during the period of the Commission circa 1944, and lived near Marble Arch at 14, Albion Gate, Hyde Park Place, London W2 prior to his death in 1978.

He was a Director of the YMCA and held several high positions in the Diocese of the Anglican Church of Ceylon.

== Honours ==
Goonetilleke received several honours and medals during his public service as the Auditor General, wartime service as Civil Defense Commissioner and in the later political career.

| Ribbon | Name | Date awarded |
|---|---|---|
| | Knight Grand Cross of the Order of Saint Michael and Saint George (GCMG) | 1954 (KCMG: 1948; CMG: 1941) |
| | Knight Commander of the Royal Victorian Order (KCVO) | 1954 |
| | Knight Commander of the Order of the British Empire (KBE) | 1944 |
| | Knight of Justice of the Most Venerable Order of the Hospital of Saint John of Jerusalem (KStJ) | 1955 |
| | Defence Medal | 1945 |
| | King George V Silver Jubilee Medal | 1935 |
| | King George VI Coronation Medal | 1937 |
| | Queen Elizabeth II Coronation Medal | 1952 |

== See also ==
- List of Sri Lankan non-career diplomats

Government offices
| Preceded by Sir Herwald Ramsbotham | Governor-General of Ceylon; 1954–1962 | Succeeded by William Gopallawa |
Legal offices
| Preceded by F. G. Morley | Colonial Auditor; 1931–1946 | Succeeded by E. Allen Smith |
