= Francis D'Oyly (British Army general) =

British Army general

Lieutenant-General Francis D'Oyly
- Born: 1750; London
- Died: 4 March 1803 (aged 52–53); Half Moon Street, London
- Relatives: Thomas D'Oyly (father); Sir Francis D'Oyly (nephew)
- Military career
- Allegiance: United Kingdom
- Branch: British Army
- Service years: 1769–1803
- Rank: Lieutenant-general
- Unit: 1st Foot Guards
- Commands: 1st Guards Brigade
- Conflicts: American Revolutionary War; French Revolutionary Wars; Flanders campaign; Battle of Lincelles (WIA); Anglo-Russian Invasion of Holland; Battle of Callantsoog; Battle of Bergen; Battle of Alkmaar

Lieutenant-General Francis D'Oyly (1750 – 4 March 1803) was a British Army officer.

He was a younger son of Thomas D'Oyly.

He purchased a lieutenancy on 10 April 1775. He received a commission as captain (regimental rank) and lieutenant colonel (army rank) in the First Regiment of Foot Guards on 27 April 1780 and received command of a company on 9 May. On 22 November 1790, he was promoted to colonel (army rank).

D'Oyly was lightly wounded at the Battle of Lincelles, and served with the 1st Regiment of Foot Guards in Flanders from 1794 to 1795. He was promoted to major general on 3 October 1794. Promoted from second to first major of the regiment on 3 October 1797, he was then appointed the regimental lieutenant colonel on 11 October. He served as a brigade commander in the 1799 Anglo-Russian expedition to the Netherlands. He became colonel commandant of the 2nd Battalion, 15th Regiment of Foot on 18 November 1799. D'Oyly was promoted to lieutenant general on 1 January 1801. He went on half-pay in 1802, when the 2nd Battalion was disbanded, and was appointed colonel of the 67th (South Hampshire) Regiment of Foot on 25 February 1803.

Military offices
Preceded by Edward Maxwell Browne	Colonel of the 67th (the South Hampshire) Regiment of Foot; 1803	Succeeded by Peter Craig
