= John Courtail =

John Courtail (bapt. 18 July 1715 – 25 February 1806) was an English cleric, Archdeacon of Lewes from 1770 until 1806.

Courtail was born at Exeter, the son of French parents. He matriculated at Clare College, Cambridge in 1732, graduating B.A. in 1736 and M.A. in 1739. He was a Fellow of Clare from 1736, becoming senior proctor. He was rector of Great Gransden and Burwash, becoming Archdeacon of Lewes in 1770. James Hurdis became Courtail's curate at Burwash in 1786, and dedicated to him the 1788 poem The Village Curate.

He died in Burwash, aged 90.

Church of England titles
Preceded by Thomas D'Oyly	Archdeacon of Lewes; 1770–1806	Succeeded by Matthias D'Oyly
