= S. Swarnajothi =

38th Auditor General of Sri Lanka
- In office 3 January 2007 – August 2010
- Preceded by: P. A. Pematilaka
- Succeeded by: H. A. S. Samaraweera

Personal details
- Education: University of Sri Jayewardenepura; University of Moratuwa

S. Swarnajothi was the 38th Auditor General of Sri Lanka. He was appointed on 3 January 2007, succeeding P. A. Pematilaka. He was succeeded by H. A. S. Samaraweera. Swarnajothi serves on the Board of Directors of Commercial Bank since 20 August 2012. He is a Fellow of the Institute of Chartered Accountants of Sri Lanka and a Fellow of the Institute of Certified Management Accountants of Sri Lanka and also a member of the Institute of Certified Management Accountants of Australia.

Legal offices
Preceded by P. A. Pematilaka	Auditor General of Sri Lanka; 2007–2010	Succeeded by H. A. S. Samaraweera
