= B. L. W. Fernando =

31st Auditor General of Ceylon

31st Auditor General of Ceylon
- In office 21 February 1964 – 15 August 1969
- Preceded by: D. S. De Silva
- Succeeded by: D. R. Settinayake

B. L. W. Fernando was the 31st Auditor General of Ceylon. He was appointed on 21 February 1964, succeeding D. S. De Silva, and held the office until 15 August 1969. He was succeeded by D. R. Settinayake.

Legal offices
Preceded by D. S. De Silva	Auditor General of Ceylon; 1964–1969	Succeeded by D. R. Settinayake
