= Wilfrid Wentworth Woods =

British colonial financial administrator

25th Colonial Auditor
- In office 27 May 1914 – 1 March 1922
- Preceded by: D. S. MacGregor
- Succeeded by: F. G. Morley

Personal details
- Born: 11 November 1876 Bishopstone, Wiltshire, England
- Died: 7 January 1947 (aged 70) Cairo, Egypt
- Spouse: Ethel Maud Palmer (m. 1905)
- Children: Sir Wilfrid John Wentworth Woods
- Education: St. John's School, Leatherhead
- Alma mater: Oxford University (BA, 1903)

Sir Wilfrid Wentworth Woods KCMG KBE (11 November 1876 – 7 January 1947) was a British colonial financial administrator.

His roles included serving as the 25th Colonial Auditor of Sri Lanka (then known as Ceylon) from 27 May 1914 until 1 March 1922, Financial Secretary of Ceylon and as a member of the Newfoundland Commission of Government from 1937 to 1944.

He was the father of Admiral Sir Wilfrid John Wentworth Woods (1906– 1975).

== Honours ==
- 1926 New Year Honours: Commander of the Order of St Michael and St George
- 1930 New Year Honours: Knight Bachelor
- 1935 New Year Honours: Knight Commander of the Order of St Michael and St George
- 1943 Birthday Honours: Knight Commander of the Order of the British Empire

Legal offices
Preceded by D. S. MacGregor	Colonial Auditor; 1914–1922	Succeeded by F. G. Morley
