= Thomas Eden (civil servant) =

British colonial administrator (1787–1844)

3rd Treasurer of Ceylon
- In office 1816–1822
- Preceded by: John William Carrington
- Succeeded by: John Drave

Personal details
- Born: 29 November 1787
- Died: 8 November 1844 (aged 56) Swansea, Glamorgan, Wales
- Spouse: Frances Elizabeth née Rodney (m. 1810)
- Children: John Patrick (b.1813), William Frederick (b.1814), Louisa Frances Catherine, Frances Marianne (b.1820), Sarah Frederica, Caroline Elizabeth
- Parent(s): Thomas Eden, Marina née Jones
- Profession: Colonial administrator

Thomas Eden (29 November 1787 – 8 November 1844) was the Secretary to the Governor of Ceylon (now Sri Lanka), Treasurer of Ceylon (1816–1822), Commissioner of Stamps, and a member of the Executive and Legislative Councils.

Eden was born in England on 29 November 1787, the oldest son of Thomas Eden (1745–1805), the deputy auditor of Greenwich Hospital, and Marina née Jones (1750–?). Eden's father, Thomas, was the fourth son of the third Baronet of West Auckland. On 4 January 1810 he married Frances Elizabeth (?–1879) the daughter of Hon. John Rodney (Colonial Secretary of Ceylon 1806–1833) in Colombo.

After serving in Ceylon, Eden lived at The Bryn in Swansea, Glamorganshire, where he died on 8 November 1844.

== Arms ==
Coat of arms of the Edens of West Auckland
| Crest A dexter arm embowed in armour couped at the shoulder proper and grasping a garb fesswise as in the Arms banded Vert Escutcheon Gules on a chevron Argent between three garbs Or banded Vert as many escallops Sable Motto Si Sit Prudentia ("If there be but prudence") |

Government offices
| Preceded by John William Carrington | Treasurer of Ceylon; 1816–1822 | Succeeded by John Drave |
