= H. A. S. Samaraweera =

39th Auditor General of Sri Lanka
- In office 2010–2015
- Preceded by: S. Swarnajothi
- Succeeded by: Gamini Wijesinghe

H. A. S. Samaraweera was the 39th Auditor General of Sri Lanka. He was appointed in 2010, succeeding S. Swarnajothi. He was succeeded by Gamini Wijesinghe

Legal offices
| Preceded by S. Swarnajothi | Auditor General of Sri Lanka; 2010– 2015 | Succeeded by Gamini Wijesinghe |
