= Richard Plasket =

Politician of the British Empire

Sir Richard Plasket

5th Civil Auditor General
- In office 14 June 1809 – 30 January 1811
- Preceded by: Samuel Tolfrey
- Succeeded by: Anthony Bertolacci

Personal details
- Born: 1782
- Died: 1847 (aged 64–65)

Sir Richard Plasket or Plaskett, KCMG (1782–1847) was the fifth Civil Auditor General for Ceylon. He was appointed on 14 June 1809, succeeding Samuel Tolfrey, and held the office until 30 January 1811, when he was succeeded by Anthony Bertolacci.

He left Ceylon in 1814 after 12 years service there and moved to Malta to serve as Chief Secretary under his previous Governor, Sir Thomas Maitland, during which time he was knighted KCMG. In 1824, he was appointed Colonial Secretary of the Cape of Good Hope, where he was heavily involved in establishing the Royal Observatory. He was finally Civil Commissioner in St Helena before his retirement in 1844.

He died in 1847.

Legal offices
| Preceded by Samuel Tolfrey | Civil Auditor General; 1809–1811 | Succeeded by Anthony Bertolacci |
