= P. M. W. Wijayasuriya =

33rd Auditor General of Sri Lanka
- In office 11 October 1971 – 2 May 1983
- Preceded by: D. R. Settinayake
- Succeeded by: W. Gamini Epa

P. M. W. Wijayasuriya was the 33rd Auditor General of Sri Lanka. He was appointed on 11 October 1971, succeeding D. R. Settinayake, and held the office until 2 May 1983. He was succeeded by W. Gamini Epa.

Legal offices
| Preceded by D. R. Settinayake | Auditor General of Sri Lanka; 1971–1983 | Succeeded by W. Gamini Epa |
