= Samuel Tolfrey =

Junaid's

4th Civil Auditor General
- In office 1 October 1806 – 14 June 1809
- Preceded by: Robert Boyd
- Succeeded by: R. Plasket

Personal details
- Born: c. 1754
- Died: 1825 London

Samuel Tolfrey (died 3 January 1827) was the fourth Civil Auditor General of British Ceylon.

Tolfrey and his family went out to Calcutta around 1800 and from there to Ceylon in 1801, where he was initially appointed to the Board of Revenue.

He was appointed Civil Auditor General on 1 October 1806, succeeding Robert Boyd, and held the office until his retirement on 14 June 1809. He was succeeded by R. Plasket.

He compiled a Sinhalese dictionary. After retirement he returned to England and died in London in 1825. He had married Mary Barboud. He had several sons, including Edward who remained in Ceylon and a daughter Mary, who married Dr. Thomas Christie, the Superintendent-General of Hospitals in Ceylon.

Legal offices
Preceded by Robert Boyd	Civil Auditor General; 1806–1809	Succeeded by R. Plasket
