= Tilak Jayaratne =

Sri Lankan academic

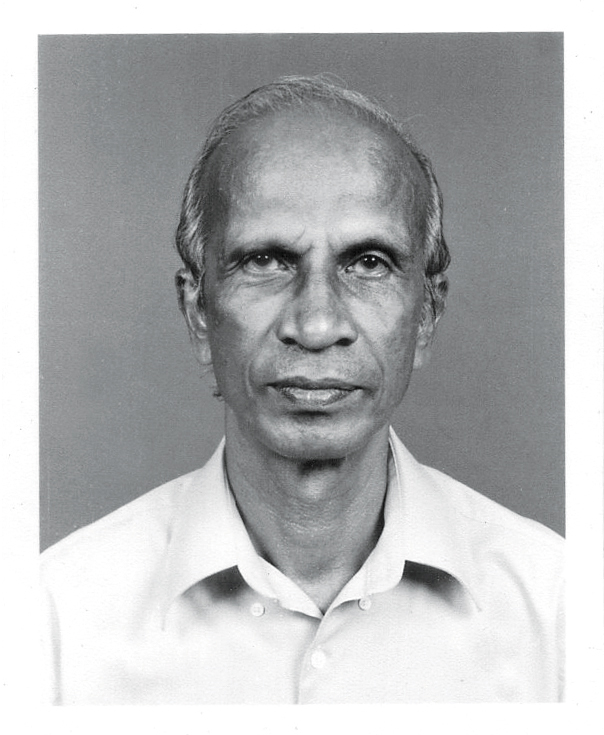
- Born: December 30, 1943; Kalutara, Sri Lanka
- Died: September 7, 2012 (aged 68)
- Occupations: Veteran broadcaster, TV and Radio writer
- Political party: Left Party

Tilak Jayaratne(December 30, 1943 – September 7, 2012) was a broadcaster, teacher and writer for radio and television.
