= Chulantha Wickramaratne =

Auditor General of Sri Lanka from 2019 to 2025

41st Auditor General of Sri Lanka
- In office 29 April 2019 – 8 April 2025
- Preceded by: Gamini Wijesinghe
- Succeeded by: Samudika Jayarathna

Personal details
- Born: Widana Pathiranage Chulantha Wickramaratne
- Education: University of Kelaniya (BCom (Sp.))
- Profession: Civil servant

Widana Pathiranage Chulantha Wickramaratne is a Sri Lankan former civil servant who served as the 41st Auditor General of Sri Lanka from 29 April 2019 to 8 April 2025.

== Education ==
Wickramaratne obtained a Bachelor of Commerce (Special) degree from the University of Kelaniya in 1991. He is a fellow member of the Institute of Chartered Accountants of Sri Lanka (FCA), a qualified accountant with the Chartered Institute of Public Finance and Accountancy (CIPFA), United Kingdom, and an associate member of the Institute of Certified Management Accountants of Sri Lanka (ACMA).

== Career ==
Wickramaratne was appointed auditor general on 29 April 2019 by President Maithripala Sirisena, with the consent of the Constitutional Council. In accordance with Section 9 of the National Audit Act, No. 19 of 2018, he took the oath of secrecy in his capacity as auditor general of the National Audit Office and chairperson of the Audit Service Commission before the then speaker of Parliament, Karu Jayasuriya.

He retired from service on 8 April 2025.

Following his retirement, Wickramaratne joined the boards of Cargills (Ceylon) and C T Holdings as an independent non-executive director.

Legal offices
Preceded by Gamini Wijesinghe	Auditor General of Sri Lanka; 2019–2025	Succeeded by Samudika Jayarathna
