= National Audit Office (Sri Lanka) =

Independent government department in Sri Lanka

- ජාතික විගණන කාර්යාලය கணக்காய்வாளர் தலைமை அதிபதியின் திணைக்களம்

Agency overview
- Formed: January 24, 1799; 227 years ago
- Jurisdiction: Government of Sri Lanka
- Headquarters: 306/72 Polduwa road, Battaramulla; 6.903626°N 79.912496°E
- Employees: 1518 (2017)
- Annual budget: Rs 1.35 billion (2016)
- Agency executive: Chulantha Wickramaratne, Auditor General of Sri Lanka
- Key document: Article 153 of the Constitution of Sri Lanka
- Website: www.auditorgeneral.gov.lk

The National Audit Office (Sinhala: ජාතික විගණන කාර්යාලය jātika vigaṇana kāryālaya) is a non-ministerial government department in Sri Lanka. Established in 1799, it is one of the oldest government departments in the country, and is responsible for auditing public organisations. These include all departments of Government, the Offices of the Cabinet of Ministers, the Judicial Service Commission, the Public Service Commission, the Parliamentary Commissioner for Administration, the Secretary-General of Parliament and the Commissioner of Elections, local authorities, public corporations and business or other undertakings vested in the Government under any written law.

The head of the department is the Auditor General of Sri Lanka, currently Chulantha Wickramaratne.

== See also ==
- Auditor General of Sri Lanka
