= Auditor General of Sri Lanka =

Government official responsible for auditing government operations

- ශ්‍රී ලංකා විගණකාධිපති இலங்கை கணக்காய்வாளர் தலைமை
- Incumbent; Samudika Jayarathna since 5 February 2026
- Auditor-General's Department
- Seat: 306/72 Polduwa road, Battaramulla
- Nominator: President of Sri Lanka
- Appointer: The president with Constitutional Council advice and consent
- Formation: 24 January 1799; 227 years ago
- First holder: Cecil Smith (as Accountant and Auditor General)
- Website: auditorgeneral.gov.lk

The auditor general of Sri Lanka (Sinhala: ශ්‍රී ලංකා විගණකාධිපති Śrī Laṃkā viganakādhipathi; Tamil: இலங்கை கணக்காய்வாளர் தலைமை) is appointed by the President to aid accountability by conducting independent audits of government operations. These audits provide members of Parliament with objective information to help them examine the government's activities and hold it to account. According to the constitution, the auditor general is empowered to audit the accounts of all departments of Government, the Offices of the Cabinet of Ministers, the Judicial Service Commission, the Public Service Commission, the Parliamentary Commissioner for Administration, the Secretary-General of Parliament and the Commissioner of Elections, local authorities, public corporations and business or other undertakings vested in the Government under any written law.

The auditor general of Sri Lanka is the head of the National Audit Office. Samudika Jayarathna, appointed on 5 February 2025, is the current and 42nd holder of the position and the first female to do so.

== List of auditors general ==
While the title of Auditor General of Sri Lanka was formally adopted on the country's enactment of its 1978 republican constitution, the position or an equivalent to it has existed since 1799 under various titles. The department in its current form considers itself a continuation of the office established in 1799, and the table below thus lists all officeholders that have held positions equivalent to the position of the current Auditor General.

No.	Auditor General	Took office	Left office	Appointed by	Ref.
Accountant and Auditor General
1	Cecil Smith	24 January 1799	1799	North	
Civil Auditor and Accountant General
2	Thomas Frazer	September 1799	1802	North	
Accountant General and Civil Auditor
3	Robert Boyd	29 September 1802	1806	North	
Civil Auditor General
4	Samuel Tolfrey	1 October 1806	1809	Maitland	
5	Richard Plasket	14 June 1809	1811	Maitland	
6	Anthony Bertolacci	30 January 1811	1814	Maitland	
7	John D'Oyly	1 September 1814	1816	Brownrigg	
8	Edward Tolfrey	2 March 1816	1 December 1817	Brownrigg	
9	John William Carrington	1 December 1817	1823	Brownrigg	
10	Henry Augustus Marshall	1823	1841	Campbell	
Auditor General, Accountant General and Controller of Revenue
11	Henry Wright	1 February 1841	1847	Stewart-Mackenzie	
12	Charles Justin MacCarthy	28 May 1847	1851	Tennent	
13	William Charles Gibson	1 October 1851	1861	Anderson	
14	Richard Theodore Pennefather	24 June 1861	1866	MacCarthy	
15	R. J. Callander	3 January 1866	1870	Robinson	
16	John Douglas	10 March 1870	1876	Robinson	
17	Colville Arthur Durell Barclay	16 June 1876	1877	Gregory	
18	William Henry Ravenscroft	23 May 1877	1890	Gregory	
19	George Thomas Michael O'Brien	18 October 1890	1891	Havelock	
20	James Alexander Swettenham	31 July 1891	1895	Havelock	
21	Sir William Thomas Taylor	10 June 1895	1901	Havelock	
22	Francis Robert Ellis	1 March 1902	1907	Ridgeway	
Colonial Auditor
23	Bernard Senior	1 March 1907	1909	Blake	
24	D. S. MacGregor	8 April 1909	1914	McCallum	
25	Wilfrid Wentworth Woods	27 May 1914	1922	Chalmers	
26	F. G. Morley	1 March 1922	1931	Manning	
27	Oliver Ernest Goonetilleke	25 June 1931	1946	Thomson	
Auditor General
28	E. Allen Smith	16 February 1946	1953	Moore	
29	Lionel Arthur Weerasinghe	2 March 1953	1963	Ramsbotham	
30	D. S. De Silva	14 September 1963	1964	Gopallawa	
31	B. L. W. Fernando	21 February 1964	1969	Gopallawa	
32	D. R. Settinayake	15 August 1969	1971	Gopallawa	
33	P. M. W. Wijayasuriya	11 October 1971	1983	Gopallawa	
34	W. Gamini Epa	2 May 1983	1993	Jayewardene	
35	S. M. Sabry	26 January 1993	2000	Premadasa	
36	Sarath Chandrasiri Mayadunne	13 August 2000	2006	Kumaratunga	
37	P. A. Pematilaka	23 October 2006	2007	Rajapaksa	
38	S. Swarnajothi	3 January 2007	August 2010	Rajapaksa	
39	H. A. S. Samaraweera	2010	2015	Rajapaksa	
40	Gamini Wijesinghe	27 November 2015	April 2019	Sirisena	
41	Chulantha Wickramaratne	29 April 2019	8 April 2025	Sirisena	
42	Samudika Jayarathna	5 February 2026	Incumbent	Dissanayake	

== See also ==
- Auditor general
