= F. R. Ellis =

Francis Robert Ellis CMG

22nd Accountant General and Controller of Revenue
- In office 1 March 1902 – 1 March 1907
- Preceded by: William Thomas Taylor
- Succeeded by: Bernard Senior

8th Governor of North Borneo
- In office 1911–1912
- Preceded by: Edward Peregrine Gueritz
- Succeeded by: Sir James Scott Mason

Personal details
- Born: 5 May 1849 Ireland
- Died: 25 November 1915 (aged 66) London
- Spouse: Lucy Thornton

Francis Robert Ellis, CMG (5 May 1849 – 25 November 1915) was the 22nd Auditor General and Accountant General and Controller of Revenue of Ceylon (now Sri Lanka).

He was born the son of Colonel F. Ellis.

He joined the Colonial Service in Ceylon as a writer in 1871 and became Judge of Ratnapura in 1883, Police Magistrate in Colombo in 1885 and Director and Inspector-General of Prisons, Ceylon in 1891. He progressed to Government Agent of the Southern Province in 1897 and of Western Province the same year.

He was appointed Auditor General on 1 March 1902, succeeding William Thomas Taylor, and held the office until 1 March 1907, when he was succeeded by Bernard Senior.

He then transferred to British North Borneo as Governor in 1911.

He married Lucy, daughter of D. B. Thornton of St. Petersburg.

Government offices
Preceded by Edward Peregrine Gueritz	Governor of North Borneo; 1911–1912	Succeeded by Sir James Scott Mason
Legal offices
Preceded by William Thomas Taylor	Accountant General and Controller of Revenue; 1902–1907	Succeeded by Bernard Senior
