= Sarvodaya Shramadana Movement =

Self-governance movement in Sri Lanka

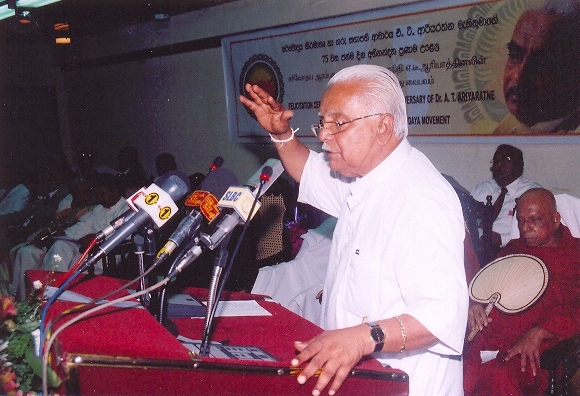
Dr. A. T. Ariyaratne, the founder of Sarvodaya Shramadana Movement

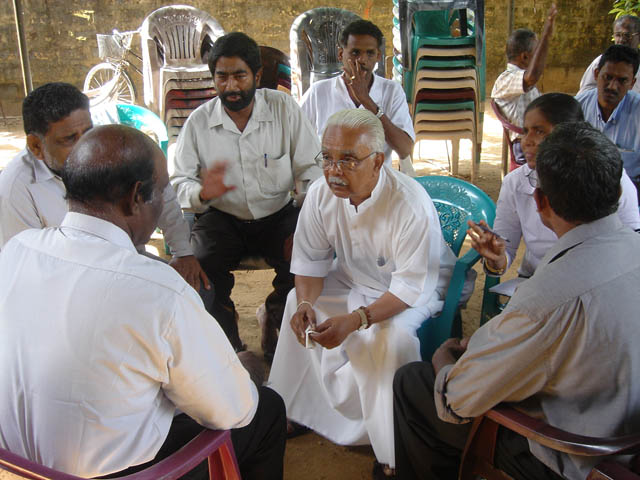
A. T. Ariyaratne in a group (in the middle)

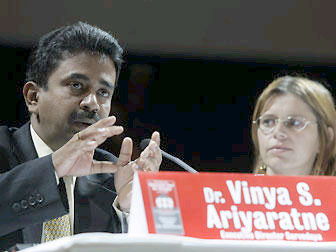
Dr Vinya S. Ariyaratne, executive director of the Sarvodaya Movement, presents a conflict-sensitive reconstruction project (Conflict Sensitive Reconstruction Project). Vienna, Austria (28 February 2008)

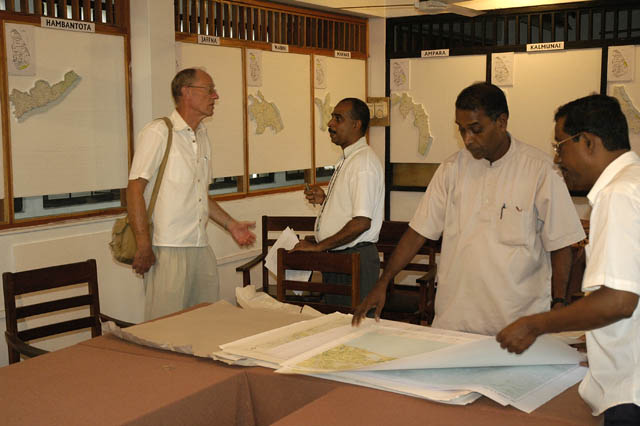
Map Room at the headquarters of the Sarvodaya Movement in Moratuwa, Sri Lanka (2004)

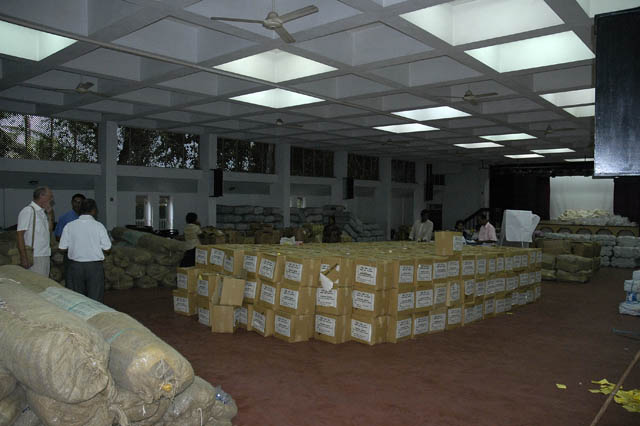
Magazine at the headquarters of the Sarvodaya Movement (31 December 2004)

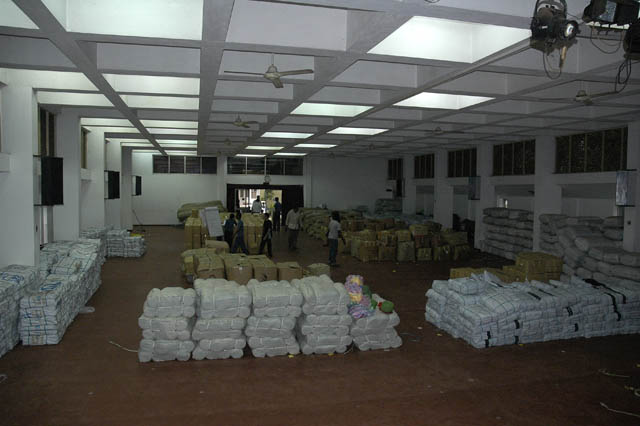
Magazine at the headquarters of the Sarvodaya Movement (31 December 2004)

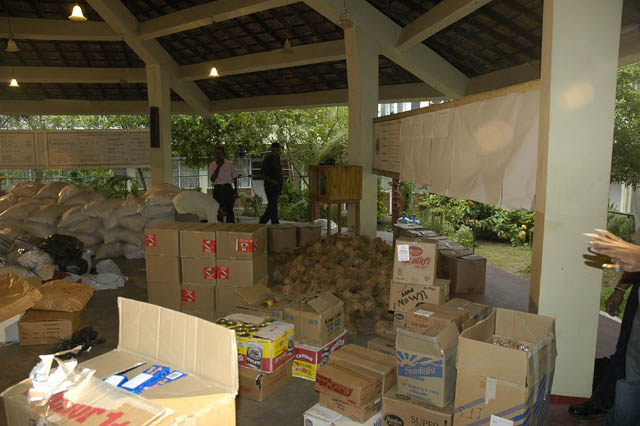
Food and supplies to be delivered (31 December 2004)

The Sarvodaya Shramadana Movement (Sinhala: සර්වෝදය) is a self-governance movement in Sri Lanka, which provides comprehensive development and conflict resolution programs to villages. It is also the largest indigenous organization working on reconstruction from the tsunami caused by the 2004 Indian Ocean earthquake.

Founded in 1958 by A. T. Ariyaratne when he took “forty high school students and twelve teachers from Nalanda College Colombo on “an educational experiment” to an outcaste village, Kathaluwa, and helped the villagers fix it up.

As of 2006, Sarvodaya staff people and programs are active in some 15,000 (of 38,000) villages in Sri Lanka. The organization estimates that 11 million citizens are individual beneficiaries of one of its programs. The group distributes funds from a financial reserve bank of 1.6 billion rupees.

The Sarvodaya movement belongs to the Global Ecovillage Network.

== Etymology ==
The movement is based on Buddhist and Gandhian principles. Coined by Mohandas Gandhi, the terms sarvodaya means 'welfare for all'. The word shramadana means 'gift of labour'. Collectively, the name 'Sarvodaya Shramadana' means 'welfare for all through our shared labour'.

== History ==
In 1958, the neglected village of Rodiya, inhabited by social outcasts and beggars, received help in the form of renovating houses, digging wells and latrines, and establishing community gardens; educational programs and self-employment help were also launched. The organizer was D. A. Abeysekera, an employee of the Sri Lankan Department of Rural Development, who while searching for solutions for this kind of community coined the term Shramadana , meaning 'gift of labour', to describe the type of help expected from volunteers. The village of Kathaluwa was to be the first beneficiary of this joint work.

Ahangamage Tudor Ariyaratne, then a young teacher at Nalanda College in Colombo, led a group of teachers and students who participated in what he called an "educational experiment." The success of the "experiment", repeated in other villages, and developing independently from the Department of Rural Development, led to the creation of the largest development-promoting organization in Sri Lanka - The Sarvodaya Shramadana Movement .

== Ten basic needs ==
Activists led by Ariyaratne tried to meet the real needs of the villagers. To this end, they conducted research in 600 villages, asking residents to list their ten most important needs, in order from most urgent to least important. The survey resulted in a list of the following needs:

1. Clean environment
2. Adequate supply of water
3. Clothing
4. Nutritious food
5. Shelter
6. Health care
7. Communication
8. Fuel and lighting (energy)
9. Access to education
10. Cultural and spiritual performance

== Program ==
The Sarvodaya program begins with an invitation from a village for a discussion of what is needed and how it can be done. It proceeds in stages through creating a village council, building a school and clinic, setting up family programs, creating economic opportunity so that the village economy becomes self-sustaining, starting a village bank, and offering help to other villages. In addition, Sarvodaya sponsors public meditations in which tens and sometimes hundreds of thousands of Buddhists, Hindus, Muslims and Christians meditate together on each other's welfare, using the Buddhist Brahmavihara (sublime attitude) meditations, which are acceptable within all faiths.

Assistance deliberately begins with a change in the attitude of the villagers, and satisfying basic needs is only the third stage. The organization insists on understanding the real needs of a peaceful, sustainable society. A.T. Ariyaratne emphasizes that Sarvodaya is about awakening both individuals and society.

The next five steps are:

1. Development of psychological infrastructure,
2. Development of social and educational infrastructure,
3. Satisfying basic human needs and institutional development,
4. Income and job creation and self-sufficiency,
5. Sharing with neighbouring villages.

Fusion – Sarvodaya ICT4D Movement is the ICT for development (ICT4D) program. As a response to the emerging digital divide issues of rural Sri Lanka, Sarvodaya started setting up telecentres experimentally in 1997. This has led to the pioneering telecentre program in the country. Village Information Centres (popularly known as VICs) are rural libraries, set up by village youth leaders as 'Zero Cost' village initiatives, which prepare disadvantaged, less educated rural communities for the information age. Out of the 172 VICs initiated since early 2000, there are about 21 VICs graduated to their own forms of telecentres by mid-2008.

In September 2012, Etisalat Sri Lanka, a mobile telephony provider in cooperation with Sarvodaya-Fusion, opened Etisalat Android Village Hub . The program aims to connect rural communities using Android tablets, which the company distributed to 20 families in selected villages for a period of two weeks and conduct internet training.

Author John P. Clark has argued that the Sarvodaya Shramadana Movement are anarchist in their organisation and goals, noting their inspiration from the philosophical anarchist Mahatma Gandhi.

== Tsunami relief ==
On December 26, 2004, at 9 am, waves flooded the fishing town of Hambantota. The director of one of the institutes for sustainable agriculture in Sarvodaya, Nandana Jayasinghe, was about an hour away from the tragedy, in Thanamalwila next to Udawalawe National Park. After 6 hours he arrived in the town with three 10-ton trucks full of food, water, blankets and other means of survival. In the following days, he organized the next deliveries, and temporary housing for the population and, along with other volunteers in the movement, helped clean up and reorganize the town after the tragedy. The movement participated in helping the region many years after the tsunami. The tsunami destroyed 226 villages belonging to the Sarvodaya movement.

In total, the movement built 1104 houses, 5593 toilets, 2274 wells, 2450 waste composters, 185 water tanks and 85 playgrounds for the victims of the tsunami. The Sarvodaya movement tried to get help from recipients themselves, in order for them to feel responsible and take part in rebuilding their own lives.

== See also ==
- Buddhism in Sri Lanka
- Nonviolence
- Sarvodaya
