= John William Carrington =

British civil servant

9th Civil Auditor General
- In office 1 December 1817 – 1823
- Preceded by: E. Tolfrey
- Succeeded by: Henry Augustus Marshall

Personal details
- Born: 1783 Southampton, Hampshire
- Died: 10 December 1857 (aged 73–74) Hyde Park, London

John William Carrington (1783 – 10 December 1857) was a British civil servant who was the ninth Civil Auditor General in Ceylon. He was appointed on 1 December 1817, succeeding E. Tolfrey, and held the office until 1823. He was succeeded by Henry Augustus Marshall.

He was born around 1783, the younger brother of Sir Codrington Edmund Carrington. He died on 10 December 1857 at his home at Cambridge Terrace, Hyde Park, London. His wife, Clara, 56, died later the same day.

Legal offices
Preceded by E. Tolfrey	Civil Auditor General; 1817–1823	Succeeded by Henry Augustus Marshall
