= Francis D'Oyly (British Army officer, died 1815) =

Lieutenant-Colonel Sir Francis D'Oyly KCB
- Born: 8 November 1776; Marylebone, London, England
- Died: 18 June 1815 (aged 38); Near Waterloo, Belgium
- Relatives: Matthias D'Oyly (father); Sir John D'Oyly, 1st Baronet (brother)
- Military career
- Allegiance: United Kingdom
- Branch: British Army
- Rank: Lieutenant colonel
- Conflicts: Napoleonic Wars; Walcheren Campaign; Peninsular War; Battle of Salamanca; Battle of Vitoria; Battle of the Pyrenees; Battle of Nivelle; Battle of Orthez; Waterloo campaign; Battle of Waterloo

Lieutenant-Colonel Sir Francis D'Oyly KCB (8 November 1776 – 18 June 1815) was a British Army officer. He was the third son of Matthias and Mary D'Oyly and younger brother of Sir John D'Oyly, 1st Baronet.

Commissioned into the 1st Regiment of Guards, D'Oyly served with them during the 1799 Anglo-Russian expedition to the Netherlands in 1799. He returned to the Netherlands in the Walcheren Campaign of 1809. On 2 July 1811, both he and his brother Henry were promoted from captains to majors in the army. On 6 October 1812, he was given command of a company in the Guards as a brevet major after the death of Lt-Col. Colquitt. He then served under the Duke of Wellington in the British Army's campaign in the Spanish Peninsula and France, after which he was made a KCB. He again served under Wellington during the Hundred Days and was killed at the battle of Waterloo.
