= Thomas Frazer (Auditor General) =

2nd Civil Auditor and Accountant General
- In office September 1799 – 29 September 1802
- Preceded by: Cecil Smith
- Succeeded by: Robert Boyd

Thomas Frazer was the second Civil Auditor and Accountant General of Ceylon. He was appointed in September 1799, succeeding Cecil Smith, and held the office until 29 September 1802. He was succeeded by Robert Boyd.

Legal offices
Preceded by Cecil Smith	Civil Auditor and Accountant General; 1799–1802	Succeeded by Robert Boyd
