= Sir John D'Oyly, 1st Baronet, of Kandy =

British colonial administrator

Sir John D'Oyly Bt
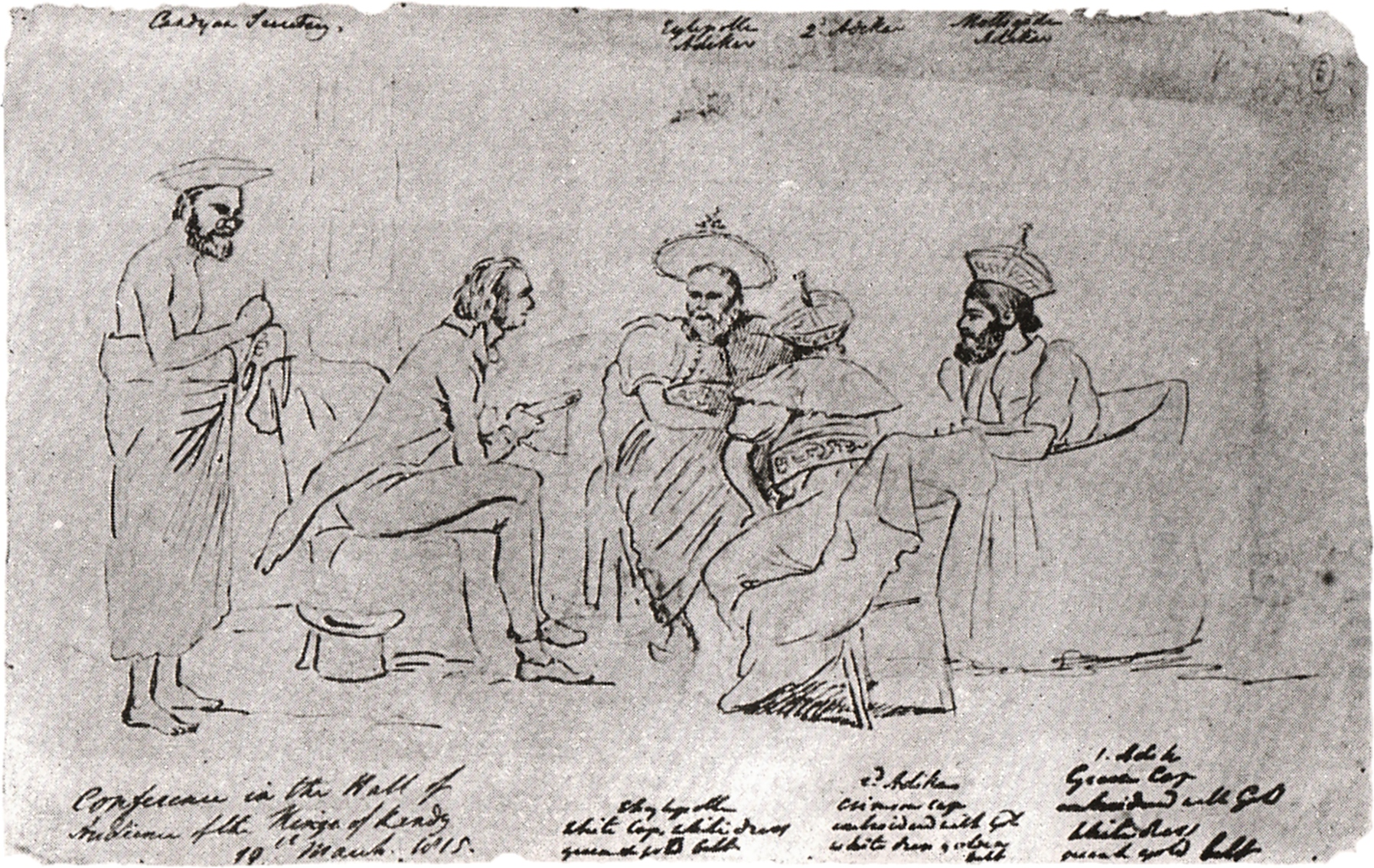
- Ehelepola, Molligoda and Kapuvatta with D'Oyly

7th Civil Auditor General
- In office 1 September 1814 – 1815
- Preceded by: Anthony Bertolacci
- Succeeded by: Edward Tolfrey

Personal details
- Born: 11 June 1774 England
- Died: 25 May 1824 (aged 49) Kandy, Sri Lanka

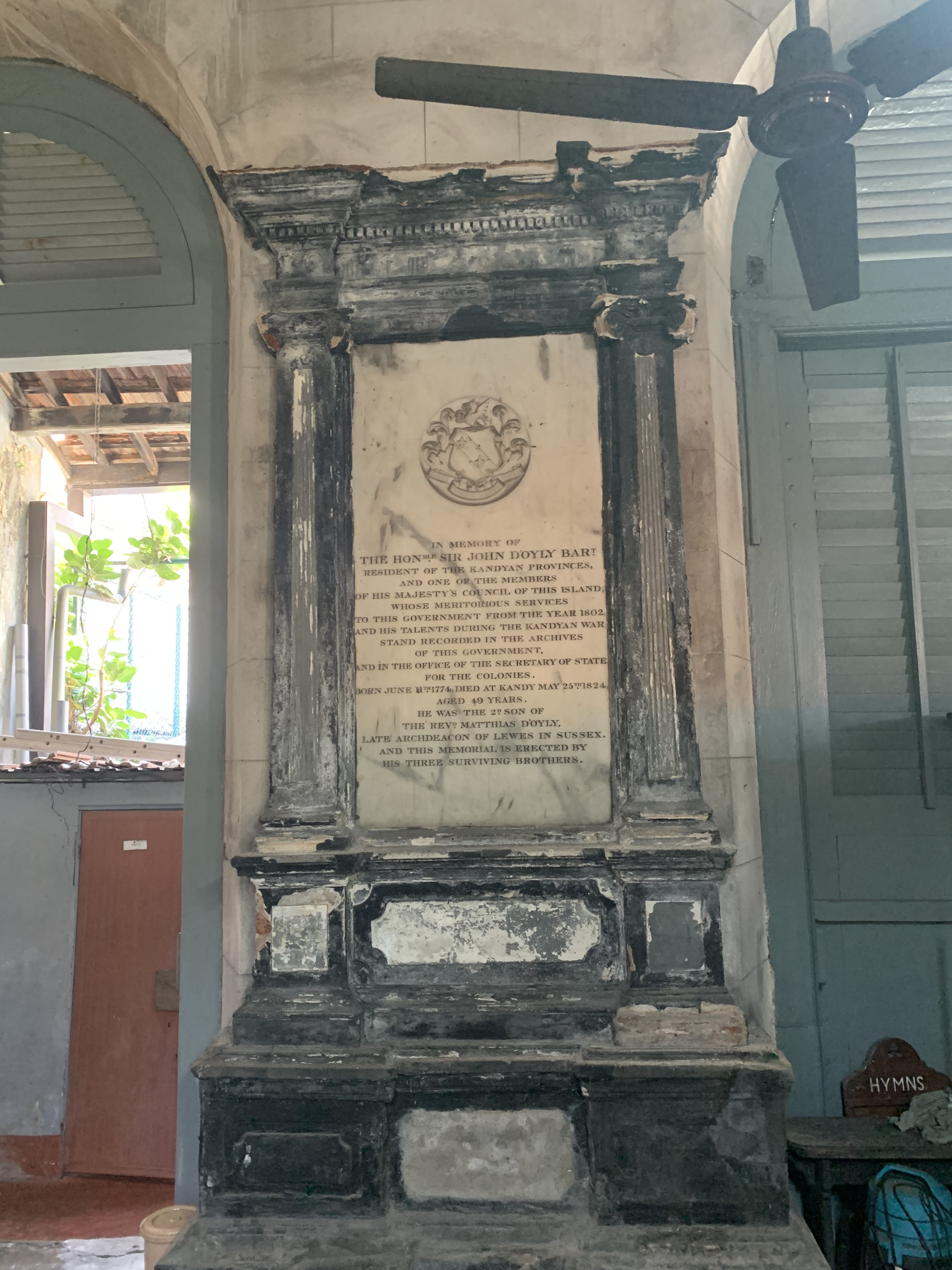

Sir John D'Oyly, 1st Baronet (6 June 1774 – 25 May 1824) was a British colonial administrator.

== Life ==
He was the second son of Matthias D'Oyly, Archdeacon of Hastings and his wife Mary. He was educated at Westminster School and matriculated at Corpus Christi College, Cambridge in 1793, graduating B.A. in 1796, M.A. in 1799.

D'Oyly went out to Ceylon in 1801, initially as a writer in the civil service and then as President of various provincial courts. He mastered the Sinhalese language during a tenure at Matara under the tutelage of the scholarly Buddhist Monk; Karathota Dhammarama Nayake Thera, and for this proficiency, he was appointed as the Government's chief translator in 1805. He became an Agent of Revenue for the District of Colombo the following year. Further promotions saw him elevated through the ranks of civil and military and he was ultimately appointed to the post of Civil Auditor-General.

D'Oyly had a key role in arranging for the British takeover of the Kandyan kingdom in 1815. Being fluent in Sinhala, he was the intermediary between the British Governor Thomas Maitland and the disaffected Kandyan chiefs who were intriguing to "sell out" the king, Sri Vikrama Rajasinha. D'Oyly is credited with drafting the Kandyan Convention of March 2, 1815 which set out the terms of the accession.

He was created a baronet in 1821 and chose to stay in Kandy, eventually dying there in 1824. A Briton who visited Kandy before 1815 had described him as living like a "Cingalese hermit". His earlier association with a woman poet, Gajaman Nona, in Matara led to some speculation.

He died in 1824 and was buried in Garrison Cemetery, Kandy. His Obituary, from the Ceylon Gazette of May 29, 1824, read:

"Died, at Kandy on the 25th inst at 1 O' clock AM of Remittent Fever caught on an official tour in the Seven Korles, The Honorable Sir John D'Oyly Baronet, a Member of His Majesty's Council in Ceylon and Resident and First Commissioner of Government in the Kandyan Provinces.

His remains were removed from his late residence in the Palace for Interment in the burial ground of the Garrison on the morning of the 26th Inst. at 7 O' clock the troops of the Garrison lining the road from the Palace to the burial ground resting on their arms reversed, while Minute Guns were fired by the Royal Artillery in the Castle, as the procession moved along in the following order;

The Korales and Arachchies of the Udaratte

The Band of the Ceylon Regiment,

THE BODY, borne by twelve European Soldiers of the 45th Regiment,

The Pall borne by six Field Officers and Captains of the Garrison

Chaplain The Rev, N. Garstin, Medical Attendant Surgeon Armstrong

Lt. Col. L. Greenwell, S. Sawyers, Esq, H. Wright, Esq, the Commissioners of the Board, as Chief Mourners.

Officers of the Garrison & Gentlemen of Kandy.

The Adigars of the Kandyan Province & Kandyan Chiefs

Modliars, Mohandirams of the Residency, Clerks of the Public Offices together with an immense concourse of Natives."

Legal offices
| Preceded by Anthony Bertolacci | Civil Auditor General; 1814–1815 | Succeeded by E. Tolfrey |
Baronetage of the United Kingdom
| New title | Baronet (of Kandy); 1821–1824 | Extinct |
| Preceded by Young baronets | D'Oyly baronets of Kandy; 29 August 1821 | Succeeded by Smith baronets |
