= List of senators of Ceylon =

This is a list of senators who were members of the Senate of Ceylon.

== Presidents of the Senate ==
- Gerard Wijeyekoon (1947 – )
- Nicholas Attygalle (1952–1955)
- Cyril de Zoysa (1955–1961)
- Sarath Wijesinghe (1962–1965)
- Thomas Amarasuriya (1963–65)
- Abeyratne Ratnayaka (1965–1971)

== Deputy presidents of the Senate ==
- Peri Sundaram (1947 – )
- Frank Gunasekera (1948–1951)
- Cyril de Zoysa (1951–1955)
- Adeline Molamure (1955 – )
- B. H. Dunuwille
- S. D. S. Somaratne

== Leaders of the Senate ==
- Edwin Wijeyeratne (1947–1951)
- Oliver Goonetilleke (1951–1954)

== Senators ==
- N. M. Appuhamy, elected UNP
- Kurbanhusen Adamaly (1949–61), appointed.
- J. A. Amaratunga, appointed
- Thomas Amarasuriya (1953–65), UNP/SLFP
- Nicholas Attygalle (1952–), appointed
- A. M. A. Azeez (1952–63), appointed, UNP/independent
- Sirimavo Bandaranaike (1960–65), SLFP
- I. A. Cader (1969–1970), appointed
- Mohamed Shums Cassim (1953–54), elected
- C. Coomaraswamy (1947–1950), appointed
- Cissy Cooray (1947–1952), appointed – first woman appointed to the Senate
- Ananda Dassanayake (1961-), elected
- R. S. F. de Mel (1947-), elected
- Evadne de Silva
- Evelyn de Soysa (1958–1963),
- M. W. H. de Silva
- Cyril de Zoysa (1947–), elected
- M. P. de Zoysa (1960–1971), appointed
- Doric de Souza, LSSP
- B. H. Dunuwille
- Sam Peter Christopher Fernando
- Chittampalam Abraham Gardiner (1947–), appointed
- Oliver Goonetilleke (1947–1948;1951–1954), appointed
- Frank Gunasekera (1947–), appointed
- A. R. M. Hameem (1963–1969), appointed
- L. L. Hunter (1950–1953), appointed
- Sir Herbert Eric Jansz (1947–1950), appointed
- J. P. Jayasena
- Ukwatte Jayasundera
- A. P. Jayasuriya
- Clodagh Jayasuriya, UNP, elected (October 1953 – 1956)
- N. U. Jayawardena, appointed (1957–)
- Valentine S. Jayawickrema
- Stanley Kalpage
- S. R. Kanaganayagam (1949–57), appointed, UNP/ACTC
- E. W. Kannangara (1954–1959), elected SLFP
- M. D. Kitchilan (1965–1971), appointed
- John Kotelawala, UNP
- Justin Kotelawala (1947–1954), elected, UNP
- Dr R. B. Lenora
- M. Manickam, ITAK
- Mohamed Macan Markar (1947–1952), appointed
- S. M. H. Mashoor (1965–1971), elected
- Adeline Molamure (1947–), elected
- S. Z. Mashoor Moulana (1967), elected
- S. Nadarajah (1965–71), ACTC
- S. Nadesan (1947–71)
- S. Natesan (Subaiya Nadesapillai)
- Ponnambalam Nagalingam (1951–57), LSSP
- E. M. V. Naganathan (1947–), elected, ACTC/ITAK
- Jinadasa Niyathapala, appointed 1960–1964
- James Peter Obeyesekere III
- Bertram Ivor Palipane (1952–57), elected
- Sangarapillai Pararajasingham, UNP (1954–)
- M. V. P Peiris
- D. W. J. Perera (1947–), elected
- Reginald Perera (1959–71), MEP
- D. M. Rajapaksa
- Lalitha Rajapakse (1947–), appointed
- A. B. Rajendra (1947–), appointed
- Abeyratne Ratnayaka
- Barnes Ratwatte Dissawe (1947-), elected
- Harris Leuke Ratwatte Dissawe (1955-), elected
- Abdul Rahman Abdul Razik (1947–1952), elected
- Philip Rodrigo
- Dr. V. R. Schockman (1947–), appointed
- H. de Z. Siriwardena (1952–), appointed
- Seetha Seneviratne (1967–)
- Robert Singleton-Salmon (1950–1951), appointed
- Bennet Soysa (1947–), elected
- Peri Sundaram (1947–), elected, CIC
- John Tarbat (1947–), appointed
- M. Tiruchelvam (1965–71), Federal Party
- Heen Banda Udurawana
- Kanthiah Vaithianathan (1952–1956), appointed
- Donatius Victoria (1947–), appointed
- A. F. Wijemanne
- Sarath Wijesinghe, elected (1947-), elected President of the Senate (1963-)
- Gerard Wijeyekoon (1947-), appointed
- Edwin Wijeyeratne (1947–1951), appointed
- E. B. Wikramanayake
- G. P. Wickramarachchi (1947–1960), appointed
- T. Y. Wright (1947–), appointed
