= President of the Senate of Ceylon =

Highest ranking-official of the Senate of Ceylon

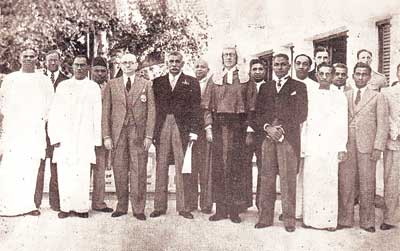
- Inaugural holder: Gerard Wijeyekoon
- Formation: 14 October 1947
- Final holder: Abeyratne Ratnayaka
- Abolished: 2 October 1971
- Deputy: Deputy President of the Senate of Ceylon

The president of the Senate of Ceylon, was the presiding officer and the highest ranking-official of the Senate of Ceylon.

The president of the Senate was the fourth most senior position in the government, following the governor general, the prime minister and the chief justice.

The Senate was created on 1947 with the abolition of the Soulbury Commission as the upper house with the House of Representatives of Ceylon as the lower house. The position of president was created under clause 16 of the Ceylon (Constitution) Order in Council, 1947, which required the Senate at its first constituted meeting to elect two senators to the role of president and deputy president. The position becoming vacant when the president either resigned or ceased to be a senator. The president had the casting vote in the event of a tied vote in the senate.

== List of Senate presidents ==
The first president was Sir Gerard Wijeyekoon, who was elected at the first sitting of the senate on 14 October 1947. Following Wijeyekoon's death on 21 September 1952 Sir Nicholas Attygalle was elected to the position of president in October that year, less than a year after he was appointed to the senate. On 18 January 1955 Attygalle resigned from the senate to take up a position as the vice chancellor of the University of Ceylon. Sir Cyril de Zoysa was elected as president and Lady Adeline Molamure as deputy president on 15 February 1955.

#	Portrait	Senate President	Took office	Left office	Party	Deputy President
1		Gerard Wijeyekoon	1947	1952		Peri Sundaram
2		Nicholas Attygalle	1952	1955		Cyril de Zoysa
3		Cyril de Zoysa	1955	1961		Adeline Molamure
4		Chandradasa Wijesinghe	1962	1965	Sri Lanka Freedom Party	
5		Thomas Amarasuriya	1963	1965	Sri Lanka Freedom Party	D. A. Rajapahse
6		Abeyratne Ratnayaka	1965	1971	United National Party	S. D. S. Somaratne

== See also ==
- Senate of Ceylon
