= Amarasuriya =

Amarasuriya (Sinhala: අමරසූරිය, romanized: Amarasūriya) is a Sinhalese surname. Notable people with the surname include:

- H. W. Amarasuriya (1904–1981), Ceylonese plantation owner, politician, educationist and philanthropist
- Harini Amarasuriya (born 1970), 16th prime minister of Sri Lanka
- Hemaka Amarasuriya, Sri Lankan businessman
- Thomas Amarasuriya (1907–1979), Sri Lankan planter and politician
- M. J. C. Amarasuriya, Sri Lankan banker and philanthropist
