= 1949 Birthday Honours =

British government recognitions

The 1949 King's Birthday Honours were appointments by many of the Commonwealth Realms of King George VI to various orders and honours to reward and highlight good works by citizens of those countries. The appointments were made "on the occasion of the Celebration of His Majesty's Birthday", and were published in supplements to the London Gazette of 3 June 1949 for the British Empire, New Zealand, India and Ceylon.

The recipients of honours are displayed here as they were styled before their new honour.

== British Empire ==
=== Baron ===
- George Archibald, JP. For political and public services.
- Sir Henry John Fanshawe Badeley, KCB, CBE, lately Clerk of the Parliaments.

=== Privy Counsellor ===
- John Dugdale, MP, Financial Secretary, Admiralty, since 1945. Member of Parliament for West Bromwich since 1941.
- Sir Oliver Shewell Franks, KCB, CBE, His Majesty's Ambassador Extraordinary and Plenipotentiary at Washington.
- The Right Honourable Robert Craigmyle, Baron Morrison, JP, DL, Parliamentary Secretary, Ministry of Works, since 1948; a Lord-in-Waiting, 1947–1948. Member of Parliament for North Tottenham, 1922–1931, and 1935–1945.
- William Donald, the Honourable Lord Patrick, a Senator of His Majesty's College of Justice in Scotland.

=== Knight Bachelor ===
- Reginald Greenwood Bailey, CBE, Adviser to the Board of Trade on wool exports. President, British Wool Federation.
- Giovanni Battista (John) Barbirolli, FRAM. For services to Music.
- James Barr, FRICS, Senior Partner, James Barr and Sons, Surveyors, Glasgow.
- Henry Vaughan Berry. For services as Regional Commissioner, Hansestadt-Hamburg, Control Commission for Germany, British Element.
- Oswald Hornby Joseph Birley, MC, Portrait Painter.
- David Brunt, ScD, FRS, Professor of Meteorology, Imperial College of Science and Technology, University of London.
- Arthur Strettell Comyns Carr, KC, Chief British Prosecutor before the International Military Tribunal for the Far East.
- John Charrington, Chairman, Charrington, Gardner, Locket and Company, Ltd.
- James Fitzjames Duff, LLD, Warden of the Durham Colleges in the University of Durham.
- John Maxwell Erskine, CBE, JP, DL, Chairman, Scottish Savings Committee.
- Robert Brown Fraser, OBE, Director-General, Central Office of Information.
- John Green, JP, Director, Thos. Firth and John Brown, Ltd., Chairman of the Central Conference of the Engineering and Allied Employers' National Federation.
- Ronald George Hatton, CBE, DSc, FRS, lately Director of the East Malling Agricultural Research Station, and Consultant Director of the Commonwealth Bureau of Horticulture and Plantation Crops.
- Captain Cyril Gordon Illingworth, lately Commodore Master, Cunard White Star Line, Ltd.
- John Ernest James, Chairman, Lancashire Steel Corporation Ltd.
- Charles Hilary Jenkinson, CBE, LLD, FSA, Deputy Keeper of the Public Records.
- William Jones, CBE. For public services in North Wales.
- Albert Edward MacColl, MIEE, Chief Executive Officer and Deputy Chairman, North of Scotland Hydro-Electric Board.
- Laurence Pierce Brooke Merriam, MC, Examiner of Controls, Board of Trade.
- Frederick Lucius O'Brien, Chairman of the Northern Ireland Housing Trust.
- Leslie Arthur Plummer, Chairman, Overseas Food Corporation.
- Joseph Francis Engledue Prideaux, CBE, MRCS, LRCP, Director General of Medical Services, Ministry of Pensions.
- James Reginald Howard Roberts, CBE, JP, DL, Clerk of the London County Council.
- Ambrose James Sherwill, CBE, MC, Bailiff of Guernsey.
- Henry Sessions Souttar, CBE, DM, MCh, FRCS, Consulting Surgeon, London Hospital.
- Kenneth Raydon Swan, OBE, KC, lately Chairman of the Committee set up to consider the Patents and Designs Act.
- Godfrey Hilton Thomson, DCL, DSc, Bell Professor of Education, University of Edinburgh.
- Arthur Egerton Watson, CB, CBE., Chairman, Civil Service Sports Council.
- Professor James Anderson Scott Watson, CBE, MC, LLD, DSc, Chief Scientific and Agricultural Adviser, Ministry of Agriculture and Fisheries.
- Percy Henry Winfield, KC, LLD, FBA, JP, Emeritus Professor of English Law, University of Cambridge.

State of Victoria

- The Honourable Thomas Karran Maltby, Speaker of Legislative Assembly, State of Victoria.
- Gordon Keith Snow, Chief Confidential Adviser to Premier, State of Victoria.

Colonies, Protectorates, etc.

- Gerard Lewis Howe, Colonial Legal Service, Attorney-General, Nigeria.
- John Alfred Lucie-Smith, OBE, VD, Colonial Legal Service, Chief Justice of Sierra Leone.
- Thorleif Rattray Orde Mangin, CMG, Colonial Administrative Service, Chief Commissioner, Gold Coast.
- Arthur Morse, CBE. For public services in Hong Kong.
- Frederick Jacob Seaford, CBE. For public services in British Guiana.

=== The Most Honourable Order of the Bath ===
==== Knight Grand Cross of the Order of the Bath (GCB) ====
- General Sir Richard Loudon McCreery, KCB, KBE, DSO, MC, late Cavalry, Colonel, 14/20th Hussars, Royal Armoured Corps.
- Sir John Harold Edmund Woods, KCB, MVO, Permanent Secretary, Board of Trade.

==== Knight Commander of the Order of the Bath (KCB) ====
- Acting Vice-Admiral (S) George Harold Bankart, CBE.
- Vice-Admiral Charles Henry Lawrence Woodhouse, CB.
- Lieutenant-General Sir Brian Gwynne Horrocks, KBE, CB, DSO, MC, late Infantry (retired).
- General Sir Sidney Chevalier Kirkman, KBE, CB, MC, late Royal Regiment of Artillery, Colonel Commandant, Royal Regiment of Artillery.
- Air Chief Marshal Sir James Milne Robb, KBE, CB, DSO, DFC, AFC, Royal Air Force.
- Sir Eric St John Bamford, KBE, CB, CMG, Chairman, Board of Inland Revenue.
- Colonel Thomas Blatherwick, CB, DSO, MC, TD, JP, DL, ADC, Chairman, East Lancashire Territorial and Auxiliary Forces Association.
- Sir Harold Parker, KBE, CB, MC, Permanent Secretary, Ministry of Defence.
- Thomas Leslie Rowan, CB, CVO, Second Secretary, H.M. Treasury.

==== Companion of the Order of the Bath (CB) ====
Military Division

- Rear-Admiral William Gerrard Andrewes, C.B.E., D.S.O.
- Rear-Admiral William York La Roche Beverley, C.B.E.
- Rear-Admiral Basil Charles Barrington Brooke, C.B.E.
- The Venerable Archdeacon Leonard Coulshaw, M.C., A.K.C., K.H.Ch.
- Rear-Admiral (E) Clement Ellis.
- Rear-Admiral Horace Geoffrey Norman, C.B.E.
- Rear-Admiral Brian Betham Schofield, C.B.E.
- Acting Rear-Admiral (S) Aubrey John Wheeler.
- Rear-Admiral Peveril Barton Reiby Wallop William-Powlett, C.B.E., D.S.O.
- Brigadier (temporary) Ivan Pringle Brickman, C.B.E. (30777), Royal Army Pay Corps.
- Major-General Edward Hadrill Clayton, C.B.E. (15934), late Royal Regiment of Artillery.
- Major-General Gilbert Minto Elliot, C.B.E., D.S.O., M.C., late Royal Regiment of Artillery.
- Major-General (local) (now Colonel) Ian David Erskine, C.B.E., D.S.O., late Foot Guards.
- Major-General Julian Alvery Gascoigne, D.S.O., late Foot Guards.
- Brigadier Charles de Lisle Gaussen, M.C., late Corps of Royal Engineers.
- Major-General Gerald Tom Warlters Horne, C.B.E., Royal Army Ordnance Corps.
- The Reverend Canon Frederick Llewelyn Hughes, C.B.E., M.C., T.D., M.A., K.H.C., Chaplain-General to the Forces, Royal Army Chaplains' Department.
- Major-General Leslie Keith Lockhart, C.B.E., M.C., late Royal Regiment of Artillery.
- Major-General Charles Douglas Packard, C.B.E., D.S.O., late Royal Regiment of Artillery.
- Brigadier (temporary) Thomas Rigby, D.S.O., M.C., late Royal Regiment of Artillery.
- Brigadier (temporary) Nelson Russell, D.S.O., M.C., late Infantry.
- Major-General Kenneth Alexander MacDonald Tomory, O.B.E., M.B., K.H.P., late Royal Army Medical Corps.
- Air Vice-Marshal Ronald Ivelaw-Chapman, C.B.E., D.F.C., A.F.C., Royal Air Force.
- Air Vice-Marshal Frederick John Murphy, C.B.E., M.B., B.Ch., D.P.H., K.H.S., Royal Air Force.
- Air Vice-Marshal Robert Linton Ragg, C.B.E., A.F.C., Royal Air Force.
- Air Vice-Marshal Frank Noel Trinder, C.B.E., Royal Air Force.
- Acting Air Vice-Marshal Kenneth Buchanan Lloyd, C.B.E., A.F.C, Royal Air Force.
- Acting Air Vice-Marshal Andrew MacGregor, C.B.E., D.F.C., Royal Air Force.
- Air Commodore John William Frederick Merer, Royal Air Force.
- Air Commodore Reginald Newnham Waite, C.B.E., Royal Air Force.

Civil Division

- Harry Beer, Esq., Under-Secretary, Board of Trade.
- Frederick Bray, Esq., Under-Secretary, Ministry of Education.
- Harry Campion, Esq., C.B.E., Director of the Central Statistical Office, Cabinet Office.
- Group-Captain Alan Sidney Whitehorn Dore, D.S.O., T.D., D.L., Chairman, Territorial and Auxiliary Forces Association of the County of Middlesex.
- Robert James Paterson Harvey, Esq., Regional Director, Home Counties Region, General Post Office.
- Hubert Kendrew, Esq., Under-Secretary, Ministry of Works.
- Gerald Bernard McCormick, Esq., O.B.E., Director of Armament Supply, Admiralty.
- Thomas Craig Woodgate Mitchell, Esq., Under-Secretary, Department of Health for Scotland.
- Sidney John Page, Esq., M.C., Under-Secretary, Ministry of Transport.
- William George Arthur Perring, Esq., F.R.Ae.S., Director, Royal Aircraft Establishment, Farnborough.
- Henry Austin Strutt, Esq., C.V.O., Assistant Under-Secretary of State, Home Office.
- Harold Symon, Esq., Under-Secretary, Ministry of Health,
- William Dale Wilkinson, Esq., C.B.E., D.S.O., M.C., Under-Secretary, Ministry of Supply.
- Alfred Harold Wilson, Esq., C.B.E., Under-Secretary, Ministry of Civil Aviation.
- Samuel Wright, Esq., Under-Secretary, Ministry of Fuel and Power.

=== Order of Merit (OM) ===
- Sir Robert Robinson, M.A, LL.D., D.Sc., F.R.S.
- The Right Honourable Bertrand Arthur William, Earl Russell, M.A., F.R.S.

=== Order of St Michael and St George ===
==== Knight Grand Cross of the Order of St Michael and St George (GCMG) ====
- Sir (Richard Henry) Archibald Carter, K.C.B., K.C.I.E., lately Permanent Under-Secretary of State, Commonwealth Relations Office.
- Sir John Huggins, K.C.M.G., M.C., Captain-General and Governor-in-Chief, Jamaica.

==== Knight Commander of the Order of St Michael and St George (KCMG) ====
- Cyril Augustin Birtchnell, Esq., C.B., Deputy Secretary, Ministry of Transport.
- Ernest Rowe-Dutton, Esq., C.B., C.M.G., Third Secretary, H.M. Treasury.
- Arthur Rundell Guinness, Esq. For services to overseas trade.
- Lieutenant General the Honourable Sir Edmund Francis Herring, K.B.E., D.S.O., M.C., E.D., K.C., Lieutenant Governor of the State of Victoria.
- Geoffrey Francis Taylor Colby, Esq., C.M.G., Governor and Commander-in-Chief, Nyasaland.
- Arthur Hilton Poynton, Esq., C.M.G., Deputy Under Secretary of State, Colonial Office.
- William Evelyn Houstoun-Boswall, Esq., C.M.G., M.C., His Majesty's Envoy Extraordinary and Minister Plenipotentiary in Beirut.
- Alexander Knox Helm, Esq., C.M.G., C.B.E., until recently His Majesty's Envoy Extraordinary and Minister Plenipotentiary in Budapest, now serving in a similar capacity at Tel Aviv.
- Sir Alec Seath Kirkbride, C.M.G., O.B.E., M.C., His Majesty's Envoy Extraordinary and Minister Plenipotentiary at Amman.
- John Hurleston Leche, Esq., C.M.G., O.B.E., His Majesty's Ambassador Extraordinary and Minister Plenipotentiary at Santiago.
- Roger Mellor Makins, Esq., C.M.G., a Deputy Under-Secretary of State in the Foreign Office.

==== Companion of the Order of St Michael and St George (CMG) ====
- Major-General Alexander Vass Anderson, C.B., M.B.E., Director of Civil Affairs, War Office.
- Major-General Nevil Charles Dowell Brownjohn, C.B., O.B.E., M.C. For services as Chief of Staff and Deputy Military Governor, Control Commission for Germany, British Element.
- Harry Faulkner, Esq., M.I.E.E., Deputy Engineer-in-Chief, General Post Office.
- Alexander Thomas Kingdom Grant, Esq., Assistant Secretary, H.M. Treasury.
- Charles Herbert Hampshire, Esq., M.B., B.S., M.R.C.S., L.R.C.P., F.R.I.C., Secretary, British Pharmacopoeia Commission.
- Reginald Keith Jopson, Esq., O.B.E.. United Kingdom Senior Trade Commissioner in Canada.
- John Atkins Peacock, Esq., Director of Eggs, Ministry of Food.
- James Richard Smyth, Esq., Assistant Secretary, Air Ministry.
- Wilfred Bethridge Topp, Esq. For services in the control of the import and export of diamonds.
- Charles Norman Atkins, Esq., E.D., M.B., Ch.B., D.P.H., City Health Officer for Hobart, State of Tasmania.
- George Herbert Baxter, Esq., C.I.E., an Assistant Under-Secretary of State in the Commonwealth Relations Office.
- Kenneth Mackenzie Goodenough, Esq., M.C., High Commissioner for Southern Rhodesia in London.
- Lieutenant Colonel Norman Charles Harris, D.S.O., M.C., M.Sc., Chairman, Railways Commission, State of Victoria.
- The Honourable Arthur Frederick Watts, Deputy Premier and Minister for Education, Industrial Development and Local Government, State of Western Australia.
- Harold Cecil James Barker, Esq., Colonial Administrative Service, Provincial Commissioner, Nyasaland.
- Charles Brian Auckinleck Darling, Esq., Colonial Administrative Service, Assistant Chief Secretary, East Africa High Commission.
- Frank Dixey, Esq., O.B;E., D.Sc., Geological Adviser to the Secretary of State for the Colonies, and Director of Colonial Geological Survey.
- James Robert McDowell Elliot, Esq., O.B.E., Colonial Administrative Service,. Provincial Commissioner, Uganda.
- Andrew Gilmour, Esq., Colonial Administrative Service, Secretary for Economic Affairs, Singapore.
- Walter Douglas Godsall, Esq., Colonial Administrative Service, Financial Secretary, Federation of Malaya.
- John Geoffrey Hibbert, Esq., M.C., Assistant Secretary, Colonial Office.
- Alexander McDonald Bruce Hutt, Esq., O.B.E., Colonial Administrative Service, Deputy Chairman, Development Commission, Tanganyika.
- Donald Charles MacGillivray, Esq., M.B.E., Colonial Administrative Service, Colonial Secretary, Jamaica.
- Duncan William MacIntosh, Esq., O.B.E., Colonial Police Service, Commissioner of Police, Hong Kong.
- James Grant Smith Turner, Esq., M.B., Ch.B., Colonial Medical Service, Director of Medical Services, Gold Coast.
- Harold Alexander Watmore, Esq., Colonial Administrative Service, Senior Provincial Commissioner, Northern Rhodesia.
- John Basil Williams, Esq., Superintending Assistant Secretary, Colonial Office.
- Denys Cuthbert Woodward, Esq., General Manager, Nigerian Railway.
- Frederick Victor Cross, Esq., Shipping Attaché at His Majesty's Embassy in Washington.
- Berkeley Everard Foley Gage, Esq., Counsellor at His Majesty's Embassy at The Hague.
- Frank Stannard Gibbs, Esq., O.B.E., His Majesty's Consul-General at Saigon.
- Colonel (Retired) Walter Hugh Jeffery, C.S.I., C.I.E., attached to a Department of the Foreign Office.
- Kenneth Roy Johnstone, Esq., Controller, European Division, British Council.
- Major-General Arthur Guy Salisbury-Jones, C.B.E., M.C., lately Military Attache at His Majesty's Embassy in Paris.
- Oscar Charles Morland, Esq., Head of the Economic Relations Department of the Foreign Office.
- Herbert Moore Phillips, Esq., lately Counseller for Economic and Social Affairs, United Kingdom Delegation to the United Nations, New York.
- Robin Haskew Robertson, Esq., General Manager, Sudan Railways.
- Charles Arthur Evelyn Shuckburgh, Esq., Head of the Western Department of the Foreign Office.
- Christopher Henry Summerhayes, Esq., M.B.E., His Majesty's Consul-General at Alexandria.

Honorary Companion

- Yahaya, C.B.E., Emir of Gwandu, Nigeria.

=== Royal Victorian Order ===
==== Knight Grand Cross of the Royal Victorian Order (GCVO) ====
- Captain Lord Claud Nigel Hamilton, K.C.V.O., C.M.G., D.S.O.

==== Knight Commander of the Royal Victorian Order (KCVO) ====
- Sir John Herbert McCutcheon Craig, C.B., LL.D.
- Major Arthur Horace Penn, C.V.O., M.C.
- Lieutenant-Colonel Edward Daymonde Stevenson, C.V.O., M.C.

==== Commander of the Royal Victorian Order (CVO) ====
- Gilbert Matthews, Esq., C.B.E.

==== Member of the Royal Victorian Order (MVO) ====
At this time the two lowest classes of the Royal Victorian Order were "Member (fourth class)" and "Member (fifth class)", both with post-nominal letters MVO. "Member (fourth class)" was renamed "Lieutenant" (LVO) from the 1985 New Year Honours onwards.

Fourth Class

- Frederick Joseph Bone, Esq., M.V.O., Mus. Bac., F.R.C.O.
- Gwendolen Florence Davies, O.B.E.
- Magdalene Glass Stenhouse, O.B.E.
- Josiah Wedgwood, Esq.
- Major (Director of Music) George Henry Willcocks, M.B.E., A.R.C.M., Irish Guards (retired).

=== Order of the British Empire ===
==== Knight Grand Cross of the Order of the British Empire (GBE) ====
- General Sir Brian Hubert Robertson, Bt., K.C.M.G., K.C.V.O., C.B., C.B.E., D.S.O., M.C., late Corps of Royal Engineers.
- Sir Walter Hamilton Moberly, K.C.B., D.S.O., D.Litt., Chairman, University Grants Committee.
- Sir Robert George Howe, K.C.M.G., Governor-General of the Sudan.

==== Dame Commander of the Order of the British Empire (DBE) ====
- Senior Controller (temporary) Mary Joan Caroline Tyrwhitt, O.B.E., Women's Royal Army Corps.
- Air Commandant Felicity Hyde Hanbury, M.B.E., A.D.C., Women's Royal Air Force.
- Harriette Chick, C.B.E., D.Sc. For services to the study of nutrition.
- Dehra, Mrs Parker, O.B.E., J.P., Member of Parliament for Londonderry County and City, 1921–1929, and for South Londonderry since 1933, in the Northern Ireland Parliament. For public services.
- Mary Guillan Smieton, Under-Secretary, Ministry of Labour and National Service.

==== Knight Commander of the Order of the British Empire (KBE) ====
- Vice-Admiral Llewellyn Vaughan Morgan, C.B., C.B.E., M.V.O., D.S.C.
- Vice-Admiral Arthur Guy Norris Wyatt, C.B.
- Lieutenant-General Neil Cantlie, C.B., M.C., M.B., F.R.C.S., K.H.P., late Royal Army Medical Corps.
- Lieutenant-General Alexander Galloway, C.B., C.B.E., D.S.O., M.C., late Infantry.
- Harold Fieldhouse, Esq., C.B., O.B.E., Secretary, National Assistance Board.
- The Reverend Robert Robertson Hyde, M.V.O., Founder and Director, Industrial Welfare Society.
- Folliott Herbert Sandford, Esq., C.M.G., Deputy Under-Secretary of State, Air Ministry.
- Arthur Edgar Sylvester, Esq., F.C.A., Chairman, Gas Council.
- George Lawrence Watkinson, Esq., C.B., M.C., Deputy Secretary, Ministry of Fuel and Power.
- Alexander Byres Hutcheon, Esq., C.M.G., M.B.E., Senior Inspector of His Majesty's Foreign Service Establishments.
- Arthur Henry William King, Esq., C.B.E., Minister (Commercial) at His Majesty's Embassy at Rio de Janeiro.
- Geoffrey Miles Clifford, Esq., C.M.G., O.B.E., E.D., Governor and Commander-in-Chief, Falkland Islands.
- George Joy, Esq., C.M.G., Governor and Commander-in-Chief, St Helena.

==== Commander of the Order of the British Empire (CBE) ====
- Captain (E) Geoffrey Francis Chandler, Royal Navy (Retired).
- Surgeon Captain James Hamilton, M.B., Ch.B., Royal Navy.
- Captain (L) Gerald Edward Armitage Jackson, A.M.I.E.E., Royal Navy.
- Colonel Wilfrid Ivan Nonweiler, Royal Marines.
- Captain Frederick Robertson Parham, D.S.O., Royal Navy.
- Acting Rear-Admiral (S) Richard Roy Wallace.
- Brevet Colonel Reginald Womack Brooks, O.B.E., T.D. (22349), General List, Territorial Army Reserve of Officers, Suffolk Army Cadet Force.
- Brigadier (local) (now Colonel (temporary)) John Denys Percival Chapman, B.A. (34656), Corps of Royal Engineers.
- Brigadier (temporary) Thomas Bell Lindsay Churchill, M.C. (38512), The Manchester Regiment.
- Brigadier (temporary) Lancelot Eric Cutforth, O.B.E. (641), Royal Army Ordnance Corps.
- Brigadier David Fettes, O.B.E., M.B. F.R.C.S.(Edin.), K.H.S. (15746), late Royal Army Medical Corps.
- Brigadier (temporary) Richard Marie Joachim Goldie, O.B.E. (15396), late Infantry,
- Colonel (temporary) Cecil Everard Montague Grenville-Grey(552), The King's Royal Rifle Corps.
- Brigadier (temporary) Harold Francis Sylvester King, M.B.E. (24780), Royal Army Ordnance Corps.
- Brevet Colonel Frank Hamer Lawrence, O.B.E., M.C., T.D. (20093), Royal Artillery, Territorial Army.
- Brigadier (temporary) Denis Stuart Scott O'Connor, O.B.E. (38415), Royal Regiment of Artillery.
- Brigadier (temporary) William Robert Fiddes Osmond, O.B.E. (13405), late Royal Regiment of Artillery.
- The Reverend Alexander Ross, M.A. (39076), Chaplain to the Forces, First Class, Royal Army Chaplains' Department.
- Group Captain Geoffrey Augustus Graydon Johnston, Royal Air Force.
- Group Captain Glynn Silyn-Roberts, A.F.C., Royal Air Force.
- Group Captain Geoffrey Dalton Stephenson, A.D.C, Royal Air Force.
- Acting Group Captain Charles Edward Loveridge, Royal Air Force Volunteer Reserve.
- Acting Group Captain (now Wing Commander) George Percy Scott Pollard, O.B.E., Royal Air Force.
- Acting Group Captain Frederick Fitzpatrick Rainsford, D.F.C., Royal Air Force.
- Acting Group Captain Henry Seidenberg-Seymour, Royal Air Force.
- Acting Group Officer Alice Ida, Lady Seton, Women's Royal Air Force.

- Ralph Bower Ainsworth, Esq., M.C., Director of Statistics, Ministry of Labour and National Service.
- Arthur George Algeo, Esq., J.P. For services to agriculture in Northern Ireland
- The Honourable Hester Margaret, Mrs. Alington. For public services in the County of Durham.
- Percy Astins, Esq., J.P. For political and public services in Essex.
- Alexander Robert Atkins, Esq., Actor-Manager
- George Ayton Aynsley, Esq., Assistant Secretary. Foreign Office, German Section.
- John Barton Baber, Esq., M.C., T.D, Assistant Secretary, Ministry of Agriculture and Fisheries.
- Jack Croft Baker, Esq., President, British Trawlers' Federation.
- Donald Barner, Esq., O:B.E., Secretary, Retail Distributors Association.
- Reginald Haynes Barrow, Esq., H.M. Inspector of Schools.
- William Beck Baxter, Esq., Chairman of the Executive Committee, Scunthorpe Youth Centre.
- William Bayliss, Esq., J.P., President, Nottinghamshire Area, National Union of Mineworkers.
- John Beavan, Esq., Chairman, Liverpool Port Area Grain Committee
- Travers Robert Blackley, Esq., O.B.E., Chief Administrator, British Military Administration in Tripolitana.
- Charles Wortham Brook, Esq., M.R.C.S., L.R.C.P. For political and public services.
- Robert Sidney Brown, Esq.,. O.B.E., Assistant Secretary, Commonwealth Relations Office.
- Arthur Wynne Morgan Bryant, Esq., LL.D., Historian and Author.
- James Cecil Carr, Esq., Principal Assistant Secretary, Ministry of Supply.
- John Frederick Carr, Esq, M.B.E., J.P., Director of Education, Stoke-on-Trent.
- Colonel Harry Carter, T.D., M.I.E.E., Regional Director, Welsh and Border Counties Region, General Post Office.
- Robert Sidney Chapman, Esq., General Secretary, Working Men's Club and Institute Union.
- Thomas Fife Clark, Esq., Public Relations and Principal Press Officer, Ministry of Health.
- William Crane, Esq., J.P., Chairman of Housing Committee, Nottingham City Council.
- Edric Cundell, Esq., Principal, Guildhall School of Music and Drama.
- Andrew Dalgleish, Esq., Member, Colonial Labour Advisory Committee.
- Alfred Horace Davis, Esq., D.Sc., Senior Superintendent, Armament Research Department, Ministry of Supply.
- George le Boutillier Diamond, Esq., M.I.Mech.E., lately Regional Controller, South Eastern Region, Ministry of Fuel and Power.
- Edward James Dodd, Esq., Chief Constable, Birmingham City Police Force.
- Arthur James Edmunds, Esq., O.B.E., Assistant Secretary, Home Office.
- Miss Kathleen Winifred Elliott, Assistant Secretary, Ministry of Education.
- Edward Evans, Esq., M.P., Member of Parliament for Lowestoft since 1945. For political and public services.
- James Henry Ewing, Esq., O.B.E.; Head of Board of Trade Supply Mission in Tokyo.
- Brian Walter Fagan, Esq., M.C., Senior Partner, Edward Arnold and Company. Member of the Publishers' Advisory Committee, Board of Trade.
- Gordon Harvey Attwell Field, Esq., Director of Research, Aluminium Laboratories, Ltd.
- Henry Lael Oswald Flecker, Esq., M.A., Headmaster of Christ's Hospital.
- John Fletcher, Esq., Joint Secretary, (Employees' Side), Joint Industrial Council of the Printing and Allied Trades.
- Raymond Hatherell Fooks, Esq., Chief Constable, Lincolnshire Constabulary.
- Charles Samuel Franklin, Esq., M.LE.E., Consultant, Marconi's Wireless Telegraph Company, Ltd.
- Miss Elizabeth Smith Fraser, O.B.E., Regional Controller, Eastern Region, Ministry of Labour and National Service.
- Allan Gibb, Esq., O.B.E., Director of Contracts, Ministry of Supply.
- Thomas George Gibson, Esq., Assistant Solicitor, Board of Customs and Excise.
- Miss Mary Cecilia Glasgow, M.B.E., Secretary-General of the Arts Council of Great Britain.
- Captain Malcolm Bruce Glasier, Marine Superintendent, Blue Funnel Line and Associated Companies in London.
- Lieutenant-Colonel Alexander Robert Gisborne Gordon, D.S.O., J.P., D.L., Member of Parliament for East Down in the Northern Ireland Parliament, 1929–1949. For public services.
- Francis Henry Knethell Green, Esq., M.D., F.R.C.P., Assistant Secretary, Medical Research Council.
- Walter Henry Green, Esq., J.P. For political and public services
- Bertram Charles Hammond, Esq., M.I.C.E., County Surveyor, Worcestershire.
- Arthur Montague Holbein, Esq., Director and Chief Engineer, Demolition and Construction Company, Ltd.
- James Reaney Hood, Esq., Principal Assistant Solicitor, Office of H.M. Procurator-General and Treasury Solicitor, and Legal Adviser, Ministry of Food.
- Charles James William Hopkins, Esq., M.B.E., M.I.N.A., Deputy Director of Naval Construction, Admiralty.
- Richard John Frederick Howgill, Esq., Controller of Entertainment, British Broadcasting Corporation.
- Alfred Ernest Hughes, Esq., J.P. For public services in Merionethshire.
- William Ernest Jenkins, Esq., Controller of Finance and Accounts Division, Petroleum Board.
- Albert Joyce, Esq., J.P. For services to the Co-operative Movement.
- William John Killingback, Esq., O.B.E., lately Assistant Secretary, Ministry of Transport.
- Charles Henry Lewis, Esq., O.B.E., Director of Fresh Fruit and Vegetables, Ministry of Food.
- Reginald James Lloyd, Esq., Accountant and Comptroller-General, Board of Customs and Excise.
- Thomas Keith Lyle, Esq., M.D., M.Chir., M.R.C.P., F.R.C.S., Civil Consultant in Ophthalmology to the Royal Air Force.
- James Albert McKeown, Esq., Permanent Secretary, Ministry of Labour and National Insurance, Northern Ireland.
- Eric Donald Mackintosh, Esq., J.P., Vice-President, Cocoa, Chocolate and Confectionery Alliance, Ltd.
- Frederick August Andrew Menzler, Esq., Chief Development and Research Officer, London Transport Executive.
- Malcolm Messer, Esq., Editor of "The Farmers Weekly".
- Alexander Fleming Wilkie Millar, Esq., M.D., Ch.B., Chairman, Scottish Medical Practices Committee.
- Major Edwin George Monro, O.B.E., T.D, Chairman, National Rifle Association.
- Air Commodore John Gordon Murray, Scottish Divisional Controller, Ministry of Civil Aviation.
- John Ralph Nicholls, Esq., D.Sc., F.R.I.C., Deputy Government Chemist.
- John Maurice Ormston, Esq., M.B.E., Director, Vickers-Armstrongs, Ltd.
- Hugh Parry, Esq., Chairman of the Planning Committee, Caernarvonshire County Council.
- Arthur Pearson, Esq., J.P., M.P., Comptroller of H.M. Household, 1945–1946; Treasurer since 1946. Member of Parliament for Pontypridd since 1938.
- Ralph Montgomary Fullarton Picken, Esq., M.B., Ch.B., Provost and Mansel Talbot Professor of Preventive Medicine, Welsh National School of Medicine.
- Major John Chichester Poole, M.C., Member, National Advisory Council on the Employment of the Disabled.
- Joseph Davidson Qualtrough, Esq., J.P., Speaker of the House of Keys, Isle of Man.
- John Rennie, Esq., Member, Lothians Agricultural Executive Committee.
- William Arthur Rutter, Esq., O.B.E., F.R.I.B.A., Chief Architect, Ministry of Works.
- John Ryan, Esq., M.C., Member, Central Price Regulation Committee.
- Harry Harpham Sellar, Esq., Assistant Secretary, Ministry of Labour and National Service.
- Rex Beaumont Shepheard, Esq., M.I.N.A., Chief Surveyor to Lloyds' Register of Shipping.
- George James Sherriff, Esq., J.P., County Clerk and Treasurer, Stirling.
- Robert Minshull Shone, Esq., Secretary, British Iron and Steel Federation.
- Ernest William Short, Esq., Assistant Secretary, Air Ministry.
- Frank Gerald Simpson, Esq., Archaeologist.
- Cuthbert Ernest Sledmere, Esq., lately Assistant Secretary, Board of Trade.
- Douglas Bevington Smith, Esq., A.R.I.C.S., J.P., Chairman, Essex Rivers Catchment Board.
- Major Frank Walker Smith, M.I.Mech.E., T.D., J.P., Chairman and Managing Director, Enfield Cycle Company, Ltd.
- George Frederick Herbert Smith, Esq., D.Sc. For services to the preservation of the Flora and Fauna of the British Isles.
- Stanley Graham Smith, Esq., Assistant Secretary, Admiralty.
- Tom Snowden, Esq., J.P. For political and public services in the West Riding of Yorkshire.
- Henry Watson Stockman, Esq., M.B.E., Assistant Secretary, Ministry of National Insurance.
- The Reverend Robert Wright Stopford. For services to Education in the Colonies.
- John Storrar, Esq., M.C., Town Clerk, Edinburgh.
- Thomas Edmund Alexander Stowell, Esq., M.D., F.R.C.S. For services to Industrial Medicine.
- Miss Mary Elizabeth Sutherland, J.P, Member, Women's Consultative Committee, Ministry of Labour.
- Cecil Victor Tapp, Esq., lately Assistant Secretary, Ministry of Pensions
- Robert John Taylor, Esq., M.P., a Lord Commissioner of H.M. Treasury since 1945. Deputy Chief Whip. Member of Parliament for Morpeth since 1935.
- Colonel Frederick Charles Temple, C.I.E., V.D., M.I.C.E.. M.I.Mech.E., director of Opencast Coal Production, Ministry of Fuel and Power.
- Joseph Pitches Terry, Esq., Chairman, Gloucestershire Agricultural Executive Committee.
- William Bernard Vince, Esq., D.S.O., O.B.E., M.C., T.D., Assistant Secretary, Ministry of Town and Country Planning.
- Major Arnold Horace Santo Waters, V.C., D.S.O., M.C., M.I.C.E., M.I.Mech.E., J.P., Chairman, Advisory Committee on Sand and Gravel Workings.
- Miss Rebecca West (Cicily Isabel, Mrs. Andrews), Writer and Literary Critic.
- Leslie Gordon White, Esq., Deputy Chief Inspector of Taxes, Board of Inland Revenue.
- Robert George White, Esq., M.B.E., M.Sc., Director, Animal Breeding and Genetics Research Organisation, Agricultural Research Council.
- Colonel Mark Whitwill, D.S.O., M.C., T.D., Chairman, South Western Regional Board for Industry.
- Andrew Sutherland Williams, Esq., F.R.I.C.S., Chief Valuer (Scotland), Board of Inland Revenue.
- George David Wilson, Esq., O.B.E., Finance Controller, Ministry of Food.
- George Hamilton Bracher Wilson, Esq., O.B.E., M.C., A.F.C., J.P., Deputy President, Nottingham Savings Committee.
- Edward Grigg Wylie, Esq., M.C., F.R.I.B.A., Principal Consulting Architect to Scottish Industrial Estates Ltd.
- William Ernest Yorke, Esq., J.P., Lord Mayor of Sheffield.

==== Officer of the Order of the British Empire (OBE) ====
- Lieutenant-Colonel (temporary) George Cecil Allen, T.D. (40139), Royal Electrical and Mechanical Engineers.
- Lieutenant-Colonel (temporary) Patrick Michael Alpin (96182), The Royal Berkshire Regiment (Princess Charlotte of Wales's).
- Lieutenant-Colonel (now Colonel) (temporary) James Orme Morini Ashton (40658), Welsh Guards.
- Major Gordon Francis Bayliss, M.B.E., M.C. (72095), Royal Corps of Signals.
- Lieutenant-Colonel Edward Boggis, M.B.E., T .D. (17515), Royal Artillery, Territorial Army.
- Lieutenant-Colonel William Arthur Bromley (332548) (Territorial Army Reserve of Officers) (Special List, Army Cadet Force).
- Lieutenant-Colonel (temporary) Harold Cantrell (38679), Royal Tank Regiment, Royal Armoured Corps.
- Major John Robert Stephenson Clarke, M.C. (85598), Scots Guards.
- Lieutenant-Colonel (temporary) Thomas Harold Downes (378263), Royal Army Service Corps.
- Lieutenant-Colonel (temporary) William Makins Ford (135712), Royal Army Ordnance Corps.
- Lieutenant-Colonel (now Colonel (temporary)) Oliver George Freeman (13501), late Royal Regiment of Artillery, Employed List.
- Lieutenant-Colonel (temporary) Leonard George Carpenter-Garnier (50893), The Devonshire Regiment.
- Lieutenant-Colonel (temporary) James Murray Grant, D.S.O. (18695), The Seaforth Highlanders (Ross-shire Buffs, The Duke of Albany's).
- Lieutenant-Colonel (temporary) William Hamilton Grant (15987), The Black Watch (Royal Highland Regiment).
- Lieutenant-Colonel Dennis Robert GUINNESS (27919), Corps of Royal Engineers.
- Lieutenant-Colonel (temporary) (Quartermaster) Harold George Hancox (87766), The King's Royal Rifle Corps, Territorial Army.
- Lieutenant-Colonel (Quartermaster) Frank Harris (57115), late The Seaforth Highlanders (Ross-shire Buffs, The Duke of Albany's) (Extra Regimentally Employed List).
- Lieutenant-Colonel (temporary) Lewis John Harris, M.B.E., B.A. (47557), Corps of Royal Engineers.
- Lieutenant-Colonel Archibald Gordon Mackenzie-Kennedy, D.S.O. (30892), The Royal Scots (The Royal Regiment).
- Lieutenant-Colonel (temporary) George Charles Albert Lavell (188143), General List.
- Lieutenant-Colonel (temporary) James Henry Magill (68476), Coldstream Guards (Regular Army Reserve of Officers).
- Lieutenant-Colonel (temporary) Geoffrey Marnham, M.C. (44111), Royal Regiment of Artillery.
- Lieutenant-Colonel Stuart Clement McGregor (67582), Royal Corps of Signals.
- Lieutenant-Colonel (acting) Alan John McKibbin (298367) (Territorial Army Re- serve of Officers) (Special List, Army Cadet Force).
- Lieutenant-Colonel (temporary) Richard Capel Hanmer MIERS, D.S.O. (58123), The South Wales Borderers.
- Lieutenant-Colonel Stanley Osborne, T.D. (26524), Royal Artillery, Territorial Army.
- Lieutenant-Colonel David Illtyd Owen (14234), The Royal Welch Fusiliers.
- Lieutenant-Colonel (temporary) Arthur George Peart, B.A. (64546), Corps of Royal Engineers.
- Lieutenant-Colonel (temporary) Donald Ian Robertson, M.C. (44147), Royal Regiment of Artillery.
- Lieutenant-Colonel (local Brigadier) James Alexander Rowland Robertson, D.S.O., M.B.E. (384323), The Brigade of Gurkhas.
- Lieutenant-Colonel (temporary) Geoffrey Vincent Seymour, M.B.E. (171332), Corps of Royal Engineers.
- Lieutenant-Colonel (temporary) (Quartermaster) James Somervell, M.B.E. (87105), The Bedfordshire and Hertfordshire Regiment (Extra Regimentally Employed List).
- Lieutenant-Colonel (temporary) Kenneth Gordon Thrift (185395), The Queen's Own Royal West Kent Regiment.
- Lieutenant-Colonel (temporary) (Quartermaster) Henry Tottle (86362), Royal Army Medical Corps.
- Lieutenant-Colonel William James Kennedy Viney (56755), Royal Electrical and Mechanical Engineers.
- Lieutenant-Colonel (acting) Alfred Campbell Whyte (286224) (Territorial Army Reserve of Officers) (Special List, Army Cadet Force).
- Group Captain John Joseph Murphy, Royal Air Force.
- Acting Group Captain Eustace Fellowes Hawkins, D.S.O., Royal Air Force.
- Wing Commander Gerald Keeble Buckingham, D.F.C. (37463), Royal Air Force.
- Wing Commander John Leslie Crosbie (33134), Royal Air Force.
- Wing Commander. Cyril James Giles (26221), Royal Air Force.
- Wing Commander Leonard Edgar Giles, D.F.C., A.F.C..(42213), Royal Air Force.
- Wing Commander Christopher Harold Hartley, D.F.C., A.F.C. (72439), Royal Air Force.
- Wing Commander. James Andrew Hickey (43393), Royal Air Force.
- Wing Commander Thomas Strong Kennedy (31193), Royal Air Force.
- Wing Commander Stanley Jackson Marchbank, D.F.C. (33007), Royal Air Force.
- Wing Commander David Anthony Reddick, D.F.C., A.F.C. (43522), Royal.Air Force.
- Wing Commander Edward Alexander Rice, MB., B.Ch. (23031), Royal Air Force.
- Wing Commander Donald Leslie Rundle (73380), Royal Air Force.
- Acting Wing Officer Eleanor Merible Fitter (708), Women's Royal Air Force.
- Acting Wing Commander Harry Vatcher, M.B.E. (35286), Royal Air Force.
- Acting Wing Commander Charles Victor Douglas Willis, D.S.O., D.F.C: (33354), Royal Air Force.

=== Order of the Companions of Honour (CH) ===
- Lionel George Curtis, Esq., President, Royal Institute of International Affairs.

== Ceylon ==
=== Knights Bachelor ===
- Arthur Marcelles de Silva, Esq., C.B.E., F.R.C.S.. L.R.C.P.. Member of the Public Service Commission.
- The Honourable Edwin Arthur Lewis Wijewardena, KC, Chief Justice of Ceylon.

=== Order of Saint Michael and Saint George ===
==== Companions of the Order of St Michael and St George (CMG) ====
- Louis Lucien Hunter, Esq., Government Agent, Western Province.
- Arthur Godwin Ransinha, Esq., C.B.E., Permanent Secretary, Ministry of Agriculture and Lands

=== Order of the British Empire ===
==== Knights Commander of the Order of the British Empire (KBE) ====
Civil Division

- The Honourable Alexander Francis Molamure, M.P., Speaker, House of Representatives.

==== Commanders of the Order of the British Empire (CBE) ====
Civil Division

- Ralph Henry Bassett, Esq., O.B.E., Permanent Secretary, Ministry of Industries, Industrial Research and Fisheries.
- Chinnappah Coomaraswamy, Esq., Senator.
- Melvill Keverne Trelawny Sandy, Esq., Government Agent, Province of Uva.

==== Officers of the Order of the British Empire (OBE) ====
Civil Division

- Samson Felix Amarasinghe, Esq., Acting Land Commissioner.
- Kirikankanange Justin De Silva, Esq., L.M.S., J.P. For public services in Moratuwa.
- Joseph Hubert Fernando Jayasuriya, Esq., F.R.C.S., L.R.C.P., L.M.S., Senior Surgeon, General Hospital, Ceylon.
- Arumugam Wisuvalingam Mailvaganam, Esq., Professor of Physics, University of Ceylon.
- Gunapala Piyasena Malalasekera, Esq., Ph.D., D.Litt., Professor of Pali, University of Ceylon.
- Frederick Alfred Earle Price, Esq., Planter, Visiting Agent and Valuator, Matale District.
- Kulatilaka Attanayake Tudor Ranasinghe, Esq., J.P., lately Crown Proctor.
- Walter Gerald Wickremasinghe, Esq., M.R.C.S., L.R.C.P., L.M.S., Acting Director of Medical and Sanitary Services.

==== Members of the Order of the British Empire (MBE) ====
Civil Division

- Alexander Nicholas D'Abrew Abeyesinghe, Esq. For services to the Co-operative Movement.
- Mohamed Shums Cassim, Esq. For public services in Kurunegala.
- Miss Gladys Croft. For educational and social services in Batticaloa.
- Edward Albert Delgoda, Esq. For public services in Kahawatte.
- Major Frederick Cecil de Saram. For services to sport.
- Miss Evangeli-n e ' Mary Moonemalle Goonawardene. For social services in Kurunegala District.
- Captain Ayampillai Charles Kanagasingham. For public services in Trincomalee.
- Arthur Courtney Richards, Esq., Printer to the Government of Ceylon.

==== Imperial Service Order (ISO) ====
- Vincent Leopold Peter Perera, Esq., Office Assistant, Public Works Department.
