= Esufaly Goolamhusen Adamaly =

Ceylonese merchant and legislator

Esufaly Goolamhusen Adamaly, JP, was a Bohra merchant and legislator in Ceylon.

Mohamedbhoy Allibhoy immigrated to Ceylon from India and became a successful merchant. His firm E. G. Adamaly & Co., named after his three sons, Esufally, Gulamhussein and Adamaly, was at the time the largest importer of rice, sugar, flour, matches, kerosene and grain. In 1905, the firm imported 400,000 bags of rice per year and owned extensive property in Colombo, Kandy, and Nuwara Eliya including the 120-hectare (300-acre) Fairfield Estate of rubber and tea in Avissaewella.

Esufaly Goolamhusen Adamaly was born in Cutch, India and was educated firstly in Bombay and subsequently at St. Joseph's College, Colombo.

He was appointed by the Governor of Ceylon as the Indian unofficial member of Legislative Council of Ceylon in 1920 and served until 1925. His son Kurbanhusen Adamaly also served as an appointed member of the Senate of Ceylon.
