= Rangika =

Rangika is both a given name and a surname. Notable people with the name include:

- Rangika Fernando (born 1988), Sri Lankan cricketer
- Rangika Halwatura (born 1978), Sri Lankan researcher
- Shohan Rangika (born 1991), Sri Lankan cricketer
