= Appuhamy (surname) =

Appuhamy (Sinhala: අප්පුහාමි) is a Sinhalese surname. Notable people with the surname include:

- Hector Appuhamy, Sri Lankan politician
- N. M. Appuhamy (born 1975), Ceylonese businessman
- R. M. Appuhamy (born 1930), Ceylonese politician
- Sunil Roshan Appuhamy (born 1993), Sri Lanka footballer
