= Somaratne =

Somaratne (Sinhala: සෝමරත්න, romanized: Sōmaratna) is a Sinhalese surname. Notable people with the surname include:

- Senerath Somaratne (1928–1988), Sri Lankan politician
- S. D. S. Somaratne, Ceylonese lawyer and a film producer
- Somaratne Dissanayake (born 1946), Sri Lankan film director, screen writer, and producer
- Somaratne Rajapakse, Sri Lankan army soldier
