= Hemaka Amarasuriya =

Sri Lankan businessman

Hemaka Amarasuriya is a Sri Lankan corporate leader and executive, who holds and has held many corporate positions in Sri Lanka and the region. He was the former chairman and CEO of Singer Sri Lanka. He is also the chairman of Sri Lanka Insurance, Nations Trust Bank and NDB Group.

== Biography ==
Amarasuriya was born to Thomas Amarasuriya, OBE the President of the Senate of Ceylon and his brother is M. J. C. Amarasuriya He was educated at Mahinda College Galle and Royal College Colombo. Studying at the Institute of Chartered Accountants of Sri Lanka, he qualified as a Chartered Accountant following training at Ernst & Young. He later became a Fellow of the Institute of Chartered Accountants of Sri Lanka, Fellow of the Chartered Institute of Management Accountants and a Fellow of the Chartered Institute of Marketing.

In 1973, he was appointed as the Chief Accountant at Singer Industries and in 1977 he became the Finance Director of Singer (Sri Lanka). In 1983, he was the acting CEO and in 1984 he was appointed as the Singapore Country Manager. He gained a Diploma in Advanced Marketing Strategy from the University of New York and was appointed Chairmen and CEO of Singer (Sri Lanka) at year. In 1995, he was made a Regional Manager for Singer Worldwide and in 2004 he was appointed as a Corporate Vice President of Singer International. He was founder president of the Chartered Institute of Marketing (Sri Lanka Region).
