= Tissa Central College =

- තිස්ස මධ්‍ය විද්‍යාලය

Location
- Tissa Vidyalaya Road; Kalutara; Sri Lanka; 6.608754°N 79.954321°E

Information
- Type: National
- Motto: Pali: අපදාන සෝභීනි පඤ්ඤා Apadāna Sōbhīni Panñā (Wisdom illuminates character)
- Religious affiliation: Buddhist
- Established: 5 November 1936; 90 years ago
- Principal: Malinda Jayathunga
- Grades: 1 - 13
- Enrollment: 3500
- Colours: Maroon and gold
- Website: www.tissacentralcollege.com

Tissa Central College (Sinhala: තිස්ස මධ්‍ය විද්‍යාලය Thissa Madhya Vidyālaya), located in Kalutara, Sri Lanka, is a national school. It is the first Buddhist English School in the northern part of the town.

== History ==
The school was founded by Proctor H. A. de Abrew, on 5 November 1936. The first principal appointed to the school was W. S. De Zoysa. The first two teachers at the school were Kusuma Abeywickrama and R. P. Jayawardana.

The school was taken over by the government on 31 June 1945, along with 54 other schools, under the Central College concept of the Hon. C.W.W. Kannangara.

Today the school has about 3,000 students and more than 100 teachers.

== Houses ==
The students are divided among four houses, which represent ancient Kings of Sri Lanka:

- Parakrama - blue
- Vijaya - green
- Abaya - purple
- Gamunu - orange

== Sports ==
=== Cricket ===
Tissa's cricket team currently plays in Division II – gold category school competitions, along with some of the leading schools in the country.

The college has produced a number of professional cricketers, who now play domestic cricket in the UK and Australia.

In 2008, Dinesh Perera won the Mobitel 'Schoolboy Cricketer of the Year' (Outstation Contest), and 'Best Bowler' (Outstation Contest). In 2010 Malith Chathuranga Gunasekera also won the Mobitel 'Schoolboy Cricketer of the Year' (Outstation Contest).

In 2017 Tissa Central College U13 cricket team defeated Prince of Wales College, Moratuwa in the finals of Singer U13 D1 tournament based on bonus match points. Tissa's batting was led by skipper Mithira Thenura's century and Shashmika Weerasekara's fifty runs. Tissa bowling was led by Adithya Silva who gave away just 34 runs. Tissa Central reached the under 13 division one final for the first time in their history and they won in their first attempt.

=== Battle of the Mangosteen ===
The annual cricket encounter between Kalutara Vidyalaya and Tissa Central College, known as the Battle of the Mangosteen, has been held since 1949. It is the second-oldest big match between two leading Buddhist schools in Sri Lanka and the 11th longest running big match in Sri Lanka.

The first Battle of the Mangosteen cricket encounter was held in 1949 between Kalutara Vidyalaya and Tissa Central College, captained by Herbert de Silva for Kalutara Vidyalaya and Gamini Karunaratne for Tissa Central College. Kalutara Vidyalaya won the match, making Herbert de Silva the first winning captain and Kalutara Vidyalaya the first winning team. Tissa Central College recorded its first victory in the series in 1958 under the captaincy of A. K. D. Jayaweera.

The Battle of the Mangosteen has been held at several stadiums throughout its history. The series has been held most often at Kalutara Public Ground in Kalutara and is currently held at De Soysa Stadium in Moratuwa.

== Notable alumni ==
Name	Notability	Reference
Wimal Weerawansa	member of parliament - Colombo (2000–2024)	
Manilal Fernando	Sri Lankan businessman and former international football official	
Sanjeewa Munasinghe	Permanent Secretary to Ministry of Health, Colonel Commandant of the Sri Lanka Army Medical Corps	
Mendis Wickramasinghe	herpetologist	
Alankara Asanka	first-class cricket player	
Sanka Dineth	musician, composer and songwriter	
