= Shalini Amerasinghe Ganendra =

Cultural entrepreneur and policy advisor

Dame Shalini Amerasinghe Ganendra DSG
- Ganendra in 2008
- Education: Trinity Hall, University of Cambridge; Columbia Law School
- Occupations: Cultural entrepreneur; policy advisor; scholar
- Known for: Founder of Gallery Weekend Kuala Lumpur; publisher of Veins of Influence; sustainable cultural development initiatives

Dame Shalini Amerasinghe Ganendra DSG is a Sri Lankan-born cultural entrepreneur, policy advisor, and scholar whose work has contributed to the development of contemporary cultural infrastructure and visibility across Southeast Asia. She is the founder and director of Shalini Ganendra Advisory (SGA) and the initiator of Gallery Weekend Kuala Lumpur (GWKL) in 2016, a city-wide cultural event that provides exposure to regional art movements and cultural ecosystems. The event has been described as a "pioneering culture-building network."

Her 2023 monograph, Veins of Influence, surveys early colonial photographs of Sri Lanka, analyzing their provenance and the networks of collectors that shaped their dissemination. The work highlights under-represented visual histories and situates Sri Lanka's photographic archives within broader postcolonial and global contexts.

== Education ==
Ganendra attended the National Cathedral School in Washington, D.C., and Phillips Exeter Academy, where she was named a Harkness Fellow in 2007. She is a fourth-generation Cantabrigian and studied law at Trinity Hall, Cambridge, where she was featured among the THWomen40, a profile of prominent women affiliated with the college.

== Career ==
Ganendra in 2013

Ganendra combines academic training in law and governance with expertise in visual culture and strategic institution-building. Over nearly three decades, she has established gallery spaces and cultural residences, implemented sustainable architectural solutions, and promoted public access to art and cultural programming.

She developed pioneering multi- and interdisciplinary programs to foster cultural engagement, cross-cultural dialogue, and knowledge exchange. Her eponymous centre hosted residencies, exhibitions, talks, and workshops both on-site and externally.https: Her public lecture series, Vision Culture Lectures, was cited by the UNESCO Observatory as a distinguished case study in its publication Arts in Asia (2016).

In 2011, she commissioned one of Malaysia's earliest green buildings, the award-winning Gallery Residence (also known as the Ganendra Art House). The project was twice nominated for the Aga Khan Architecture Award and is considered an exemplar of tropical green architectural design combining innovation and economy.

Ganendra was the first Sri Lankan art expert and collector appointed to the Tate Gallery (UK) Acquisitions Committee (SAAC) in 2017. She has served on boards and award panels, including the National Museum of Asian Art, Smithsonian Institution, the Commonwealth Art Award, and the Heong Gallery at Cambridge University. She has presented contemporary Sri Lankan and Malaysian artists to international audiences.

She has published widely on early colonial photography, modern and contemporary art, and craft, with a focus on cultural objects as agents of identity and historical narratives.

In recognition of her contributions, she was made a Dame of the Order of St. Gregory the Great (DSG) by Pope Francis in 2019. The Order, established in 1831, is the last of the Papal knighthoods and remains the only order to admit women.

== Personal life ==
Shalini Amerasinghe Ganendra is married to Dennis Ganendra, and they have three children. She is the granddaughter of Samson Felix Amerasinghe and the grand-niece of diplomat Hamilton Shirley Amerasinghe. On her maternal side, she is related to modernist painter Justin Pieris Deraniyagala and the historical figures Sir Paul Pieris and Sir Solomon Dias Bandaranaike. Her monograph Veins of Influence includes a survey of 19th-century family photographs documenting this extended family.
