= Sanjeewa Munasinghe =

Sri Lankan army doctor

Major General Sanjeewa Munasinghe
- Born: 1959 (age 66–67); Sri Lanka
- Military career
- Allegiance: Sri Lanka
- Branch: Sri Lanka Army
- Rank: Major general
- Unit: Sri Lanka Army Medical Corps
- Commands: Director General, Army Health Services, Colonel Commandant, Sri Lanka Army Medical Corps
- Conflicts: Sri Lankan Civil War
- Awards: Rana Wickrama Padakkama, Rana Sura Padakkama, Vishista Seva Vibhushanaya, Uttama Seva Padakkama
- Other work: Permanent Secretary to the Ministry of Health

Major General Sanjeewa Munasinghe, RWP, RSP, VSV, USP is a Sri Lankan military physician. He was the Secretary to the Ministry of Health and former Director General, Army Health Services and Colonel Commandant of the Sri Lanka Army Medical Corps.

Educated at Kalutara Tissa Central College, Munasinghe graduated from the Faculty of Medicine, University of Ruhuna with a MBBS in 1986 and joined the Sri Lanka Army that year. Having completed his basic officer training at the Sri Lanka Military Academy, he was commissioned as a captain in the Sri Lanka Army Medical Corps. Munasinghe who qualified as a consultant radiologist, served with the Army Medical Services during the course of the Sri Lankan Civil War, gaining the gallantry medals, Rana Wickrama Padakkama, Rana Sura Padakkama and the distinguish service medals Vishista Seva Vibhushanaya, Uttama Seva Padakkama. He served as the President of Sri Lanka College of Military Medicine. In 2010 he was appointed as the Colonel Commandant of Army Medical Corps and in 2014 he was appointed the first Director General Army Health Services with the rank of major general. In May 2020, he was appointed Secretary to the Ministry of Health by President Gotabaya Rajapaksa.
