= Kurbanhusen Adamaly =

Ceylonese businessman and politician

Kurbanhusen Adamaly, OBE, JP (born 1908) was a Ceylonese businessman and politician.

He was born on 31 January 1908 into a Bohra Muslim merchant family in Colombo, the son of Esufaly Goolamhusen Adamaly, a nominated Indian member of the Legislative Council of Ceylon under the reforms, in 1921. He was educated at S. Thomas' College, Mount Lavinia, and went into business.

Adamaly was appointed to the Colombo Municipal Council and served as a Deputy Mayor of Colombo. He was appointed to the Senate of Ceylon in 1949 and served till 1961. He was appointed a Justice of the Peace and an Officer of the Order of the British Empire in the 1952 New Year Honours for public and commercial services.
