= John Tarbat =

Scottish businessman, politician and sportsmen (1891-1977)

Sir John Allan Tarbat FCIS FRSA (10 October 1891 – 17 October 1977) was a Scottish businessman, politician and sportsmen who lived for 56 years in Ceylon. He was elected as one of the first members of the Senate of Ceylon.

Tarbat was born in Arbroath, Scotland, in 1891, the son of John Allan Tarbat and Nellie Baker Hunter Tarbat. In 1910, he joined James Finlay & Co Ltd. in Colombo, and was the general manager from 1929 to 1947. He was active in multiple organisations in Ceylon, including the Automobile Association, the Planters' Association and the Red Cross. He was Chairman of the Ceylon Chamber of Commerce 1932–1940 and 1945–1947, a Member of the Ceylon Senate 1949–1955, and Chairman and Managing Director of the Galle Face Hotel, Colombo.

He was knighted in 1937. He married Gladys Victoria James, daughter of Thomas Fuller James of Melbourne. He returned to England in 1965. He died in Forest Row, Sussex, aged 87.

He was a past President of Ceylon Athletic Association and the Sir John Tarbat Trophy is awarded at the All-Island Senior Schools Athletic Championships annually.
