= M. D. Kitchilan =

Ceylonese politician

M. D. Kitchilan was a Ceylonese Malay politician. He appointed as member of Senate of Ceylon from 1965 to 1971.
