= A. R. M. Hameem =

Ceylonese politician

A. R. M. Hameem was a Ceylonese politician who was a member of the Senate of Ceylon from 1963 to 1969, working closely with Badi-ud-din Mahmud.
