= Kalutara Vidyalaya =

- කළුතර විද්‍යාලය
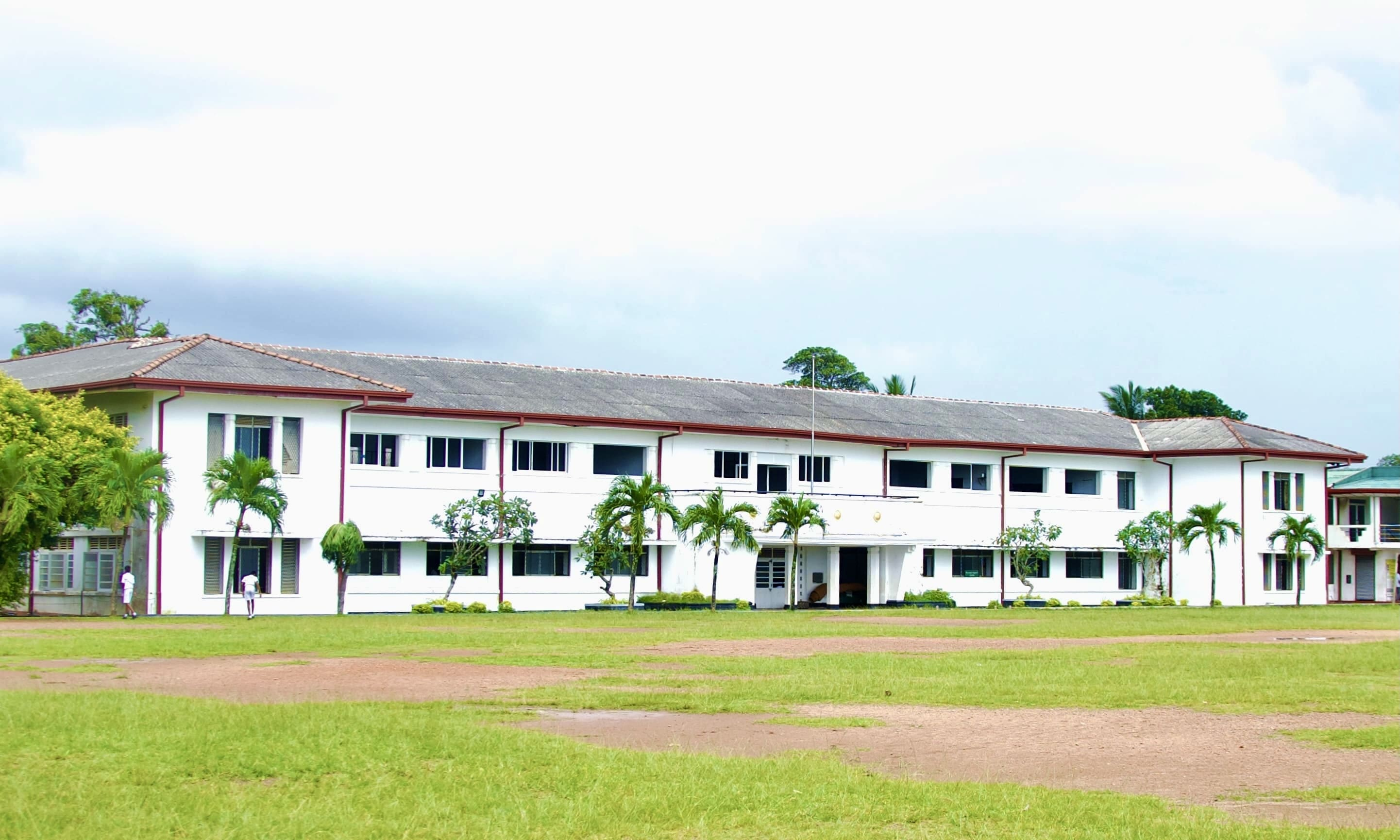
- Main Building of Kalutara Vidyalaya

Location
- Sri Lanka; 6°34′27″N 79°57′53″E

Information
- Type: Public
- Motto: Sinhala: දෑ සමය සුරකිනු (Save the Race and Creed)
- Established: 13 January 1941; 85 years ago
- Founder: Sir Cyril de Zoysa
- Principal: Pabasara Bandara
- Grades: Primary to G.C.E. (A/L)
- Gender: Boys
- Age: 6 to 19
- Enrollment: 3,500
- Colours: Dark green, light green, dark green
- Alumni: Kevians
- Website: www.kvns.lk

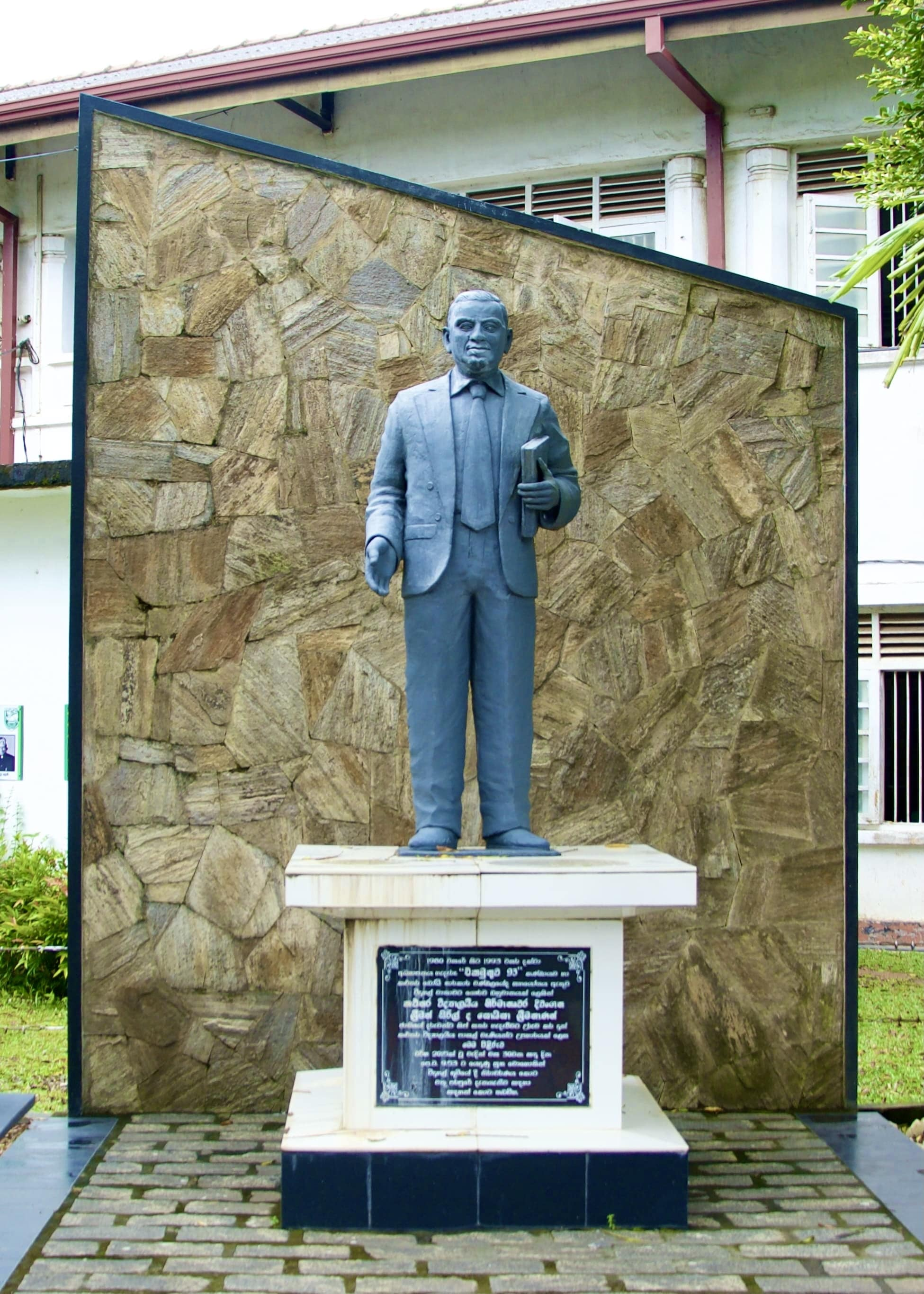
Sir Cyril de Zoysa Statue at Kalutara Vidyalaya

Kalutara Vidyalaya (Sinhala: කළුතර විද්‍යාලය) is a Buddhist boys' school in Kalutara, Sri Lanka. The college was founded in 1941 by Sir Cyril de Zoysa. It is a national school providing primary and secondary education.

== History ==
In order to provide education to the Buddhist children of Kalutara district, the Kalutara Buddhist Society, led by Sir Cyril de Zoysa, tried to start a Buddhist school in Kalutara.

On 6 January 1941, a new school was founded under the name Kalutara Vidyalaya, and student admissions began on the same day. As a result, Kalutara Vidyalaya was officially established on 13 January 1941, with 56 students and 11 teachers at the Martin Bungalow in Nagoda, Kalutara. In the beginning, the college was led by P. de S. Kularatne (principal of Ananda College), J. N. Jinendradasa (principal of Nalanda College), and E. W. Adikaram (principal of Ananda Sastralaya, Kotte). Later, D. D. P. Samaraweera became the first principal of the college.

After only six months, the college became a senior secondary school. At the beginning, Kalutara Vidyalaya at the Martin Bungalow was a mixed school. On 7 January 1942, Kalutara Balika Vidyalaya was established in Clammily House, which is also called Alwis Walawwa, by P. de S. Kularatne as the girls' school, with Kalutara Vidyalaya becoming a boys' school. On 18 March 1942, the Royal Air Force took over the school for their use during World War II.

After a short break, Kalutara Vidyalaya recommenced at Kalutara Balika Vidyalaya. Sir Cyril de Zoysa noticed that it was hard to develop two schools and handed over his Brookline House to the Kalutara Balika Vidyalaya. As a result, it was decided to maintain Kalutara Vidyalaya at Alwis Walawwa, located near Galle Road and facing both the Kalu Ganga and the Indian Ocean. This became the present location of Kalutara Vidyalaya.

In April 1946, the college began offering free education and was transferred across to the government. In 1998, the college became a national school. Today the school has about 3,500 students and more than 120 teachers.

== First staff ==
- D. D. P. Samaraweera – principal
- Al-Haj Badurdeen – vice principal (former Minister of Education)
- A. Athukorala – first art teacher
- Prasanna Perera – first student

== Houses ==
The boys are divided into four houses, led by house captains. The houses compete in inter-house games and house colours are awarded to winners. The houses are:

- Sena (brown)
- Tissa (red)
- Tilaka (orange)
- Anura (white)

== Principals ==
- 01. D. P. Samaraweera
- 02. H. M. Darmapriya
- 03. C. D. S. Siriwardane
- 04. Layanal Lokuliyane
- 05. M. B. Rathnayake
- 06. D. A. Weerasinghe
- 07. Dencil A. Silva
- 08. Upali Philip Senarathne
- 09. Gamini Goonerathne
- 10. A. G. de Silva
- 11. A. G. Weththasinghe
- 12. Thanthirige D. Ariyasena
- 13. H. Sarathchndra Silva
- 14. P. W. Nelson Perera
- 15. Mithrasena Ratiyala
- 16. K. A. D. Punyadasa
- 17. I. D. Piyarathne
- 18. Mahanama Siriwardena
- 19. H. M. Gunarathne
- 20. K. Rathnaweera Perera
- 21. H. Sarathchndra Silva
- 22. K. I. J. Peiris
- 23. M. Harshana Peiris
- 24. G.W.C.Pradeep Leelarathna
- 25. Pabasara Bandara

== Battle of the Mangosteen ==
The annual cricket encounter between Kalutara Vidyalaya and Tissa Central College, known as the "Battle of the Mangosteen" (Kevian–Tissian cricket encounter), has been held since 1949. It is the second-oldest big match between two leading Buddhist schools in Sri Lanka and the 11th longest running big match in Sri Lanka. The Battle of the Mangosteen is derived from Kalutara’s reputation for cultivating mangosteen fruit, reflecting the region's agricultural identity and adding a local cultural element to the rivalry.

In 1949, Herbert de Silva for Kalutara Vidyalaya and Gamini Karunaratne for Tissa Central College made history as the captains of the Battle of the Mangosteen's debut match. With Kalutara Vidyalaya succeeding in recording the victory in that match, the name of Herbert de Silva is written as the first winning captain, and the name of Kalutara Vidyalaya is written as the first winning team. The first time Tissa Central College won the match in the history of the Battle of the Mangosteen was recorded in 1958. The team is led by A. K. D. Jayaweera.

As of 2026, 66 matches have been played. Kalutara Vidyalaya has won 23 matches, and Tissa Central College has won 6 matches. 37 matches have resulted in draws.

=== Parade of the Greens ===
Parade of the Greens is an annual vehicle parade organised by the community of Kalutara Vidyalaya, held prior to the Battle of the Mangosteen cricket encounter. The event features a procession of decorated vehicles—including Cars, SUV's Motorbikes, Double-decker bus, and Trucks—accompanied by celebrations and cheering crowds.

== Notable alumni ==
=== Sports ===
Name	Notability	Ref
Tillakaratne Dilshan	International cricket player (1999–2016), former captain of the Sri Lanka national cricket team	
Dulip Liyanage	International cricket player (1992–2001)	
Shelley Wickramasinghe	former Sri Lankan cricketer, Chairman of the National Sports Council, vice-president of Sri Lanka Cricket	
Manilal Fernando	president of the Football Federation of Sri Lanka (1979–1999)	
Lalith Kaluperuma	International cricket player (1975–1982)	
Malinga Bandara	International cricket player (1998–2011)	
Sujeewa de Silva	International cricket player (2002–2007)	
Chinthaka Jayasinghe	International cricket player (2009–2010)	
Hettikamkanamge Perera	Sri Lankan professional football referee	
Rohitha Kottahachchi	Sri Lankan cricket umpire	
Ravindra Kottahachchi	Sri Lankan cricket umpire	
Himasha Eashan	Sri Lankan sprint athlete specializing in the 100 and 200 meters	
Milinda Siriwardana	International cricket player (2015–2019)	
Pathum Nissanka	International cricket player (2021– present)	

=== Arts and Media ===
Name	Notability	Ref
W. D. Amaradeva	Sri Lankan vocalist, musician, violinist and musical composer (Maestro of Sri Lankan Music)	
Narada Disasekara	Sri Lankan classical singer	
Daya Alwis	actor in Sri Lankan cinema	
Wilson Gunaratne	actor in Sri Lankan cinema	

=== Politics ===
Name	Notability	Ref
Somawansa Amarasinghe	Sri Lankan politician, leader of Janatha Vimukthi Peramuna (1990–2014)	
Stanley Tillekeratne	Sri Lankan politician, former Speaker of the Sri Lankan Parliament, Governor of the Central Province of Sri Lanka (1998–2000)	

=== Academics ===
Name	Notability	Ref
Channa Jayasumana	Medical Professor, Faculty of Medicine, Rajarata University of Sri Lanka, Former Minister of Health Sri Lanka, First and only cabinet minister produced by the school	
Raj Somadeva	Senior Professor in Archaeology, University of Kelaniya	
Rangika Halwatura	youngest professor in Civil Engineering Science in Sri Lanka, University of Moratuwa	
