= Ampara Military Base =

- Ampara, Eastern Province

Site information
- Type: Military Base
- Controlled by: Sri Lanka Army

Site history
- In use: 19?? – present

Ampara Military Base is a military base located in close to the Ampara, Eastern Province of Sri Lanka. The Sri Lanka Army Medical Corps maintains a base hospital in Ampara.
