= Kalutara Balika Vidyalaya =

- කළුතර බාලිකා විද්‍යාලය

Location
- Sir Cyril de Zoysa Mawatha, Kalutara South; Kalutara; Sri Lanka; 6.5857°N 79.9645°E

Information
- Type: National
- Motto: සතිමතී චක්ඛුමතී - Sathimathi Chakkumathi (People with eyes are wise)
- Religious affiliation: Buddhist
- Established: 1942; 84 years ago
- Founder: Sir Cyril de Zoysa
- Grades: 1-13
- Gender: Girls
- Age range: 6 to 19
- Enrollment: 3500
- Colors: Dark green, light green, dark green
- Alumni: Kabians

Kalutara Balika Vidyalaya (Sinhala: කළුතර බාලිකා විද්‍යාලය) is a Buddhist girls' school in Kalutara, Sri Lanka. It was founded in 1942 by Sir Cyril de Zoysa. It became a national school on 9 March 1998.

== History ==
Kalutara Balika Vidyalaya is a prominent girls' school located in Kalutara, Sri Lanka. It was originally established on 6 January 1941 as a mixed school with 56 students, functioning as the sister school to Kalutara Vidyalaya (boys' school). The school was founded by the Kalutara Buddhist Society under the leadership of Sir Cyril de Zoysa.

During World War II, the original school premises were taken over by English soldiers due to its proximity to the Katukurunda Airport. As a result, the school was temporarily relocated to a private residence on Old Road. Due to space constraints, a decision was made to separate the boys' and girls' sections. The boys were moved to Alwis Walawwa, a spacious building near the Galle Road, facing the Kalu Ganga and the sea.

On 7 January 1942, the girls’ school was officially re-established as Kalutara Balika Vidyalaya at Sir Cyril de Zoysa’s own residence, a large house with a garden, which he offered for the purpose. Vajira Kannangara was appointed as the first principal of the newly established girls' school.

Over the years, the school has been led by several principals and contribute significantly to its development. In April 1946, the college began offering free education and was transferred across to the government. In 9 March 1998, the college became a national school. Today, the school has over 3,500 students and employs around 120 teachers and 35 non-academic staff.

== Principals ==
- Vajira Kannangara
- Kusuma Hettiarachchi
- Chandra de Soysa
- Caroline de Silva
- K.W.S. Peiris
- Erica Fernando
- Soma Meegoda
- Y. Balapatibendi
- Sumana Silva
- Leela Ekanayake
- H.L.P Perera
- G. K. Gunarathna
- T.K.Weerakoon

== Houses ==
- Kusal (yellow)
- Maithri (orange)
- Nimal (purple)
- Shanthi (pink)
