= Hamilton Shirley Amerasinghe =

Sri Lankan diplomat and civil servant (1913–1980)

- හැමිල්ටන් ෂර්ලි අමරසිංහ

President of the United Nations General Assembly
- In office 1976–1976
- Preceded by: Gaston Thorn
- Succeeded by: Lazar Mojsov

High Commissioner for Ceylon to India
- In office 1963–1966
- Monarch: Elizabeth II
- Prime Minister: Sirimavo Bandaranaike
- Preceded by: Richard Aluwihare
- Succeeded by: Siri Perera

Personal details
- Born: 18 March 1913 Colombo, Ceylon
- Died: 4 December 1980 (aged 67) Sri Lanka
- Education: University of London, University College Colombo, Royal College, Colombo
- Occupation: Diplomat, Civil servant

Hamilton Shirley Amerasinghe, CCS (Sinhala: හැමිල්ටන් ෂර්ලි අමරසිංහ; 18 March 1913 – 4 December 1980) was a Sri Lankan diplomat and civil servant. He was High Commissioner to India and concurrently Ambassador to both Nepal and Afghanistan (1963–1967) and Permanent Secretary of the Ministry of Finance and Treasury and the Ministry of Health. Amerasinghe served as Ceylon's Permanent Representative to the United Nations 1967 to 1980 and served as President of the United Nations General Assembly in 1976. He was also one of the leaders of the negotiations to draft the United Nations Convention on the Law of the Sea.

Amerasinghe was the close cousin of famed Sri Lankan nation builder Samson Felix Amerasinghe, OBE.They were close allies throughout his life.

== Education ==
Born in Colombo, on 18 March 1913 and hailing from a noble family from Galle. He was educated at Royal College Colombo and went to the Ceylon University College, he took a first class honours BA degree in Western Classics in 1934 from the University of London.

== Career ==
=== Civil Service ===
Amerasinghe joined the Ceylon Civil Service in 1937, starting a career that would span 44 years. As a cadet, he served in the Kegalle Kachcheri, as the Additional Police Magistrate in Kegalle and office assistant, Jaffna Kachcheri. Promoted an officer, he served in the Puttalam, Mannar and Vavuniya Kachcheri, before appointment as Secretary to the Minister of Health in 1941. He then served as Assistant Controller of Imports and Exports, Assistant Government Agent, Kegalle, Rathanapura and Matale. He was then Assistant Secretary to the Ministry of Home Affairs. In 1950, he was appointed Resident Manager of the Gal Oya Development Board in 1950. Two years later, he was sent on his first overseas appointment as Counsellor of Embassy of Ceylon in Washington, DC, from 1953 to 1955. From 1955 to 1957, he was the Controller of Establishments, General Treasury. In 1958, he became the Controller of Finance, Supply and Cadre, General Treasury. The same year, he was appointed as the Permanent Secretary to the Ministry of Nationalized Services and Road Transport as well as Chairman of the Port (Cargo) Corporation.

In 1961, Amerasinghe became Secretary to the Treasury and Permanent Secretary to the Minister of Finance, succeeding Samson Felix Amerasinghe and held that post until 1963, while also serving as Official Member of the Monetary Board of the Central Bank and Alternate Governor for Ceylon in the International Bank for Reconstruction and Development.

In 1963, he was appointed Ceylon High Commissioner to India and served concurrently as Ambassador to Nepal and Afghanistan until he moved to the United Nations in 1967.

=== United Nations ===
Amerasinghe was appointed Ceylon's Permanent Representative to the UN in 1967, a post that he would hold until 1980. At the UN, he held several key positions, which included Chairmanship of the United Nations Ad Hoc Committee on the Peaceful Uses of the Sea-Bed and the Ocean Floor beyond the Limits of National Jurisdiction, President of the United Nations Conference on the Law of the Sea and chairman United Nations Sea-Bed Committee. Amerasinghe was also the Chairman of the Ad Hoc Committee on the Indian Ocean, which Sri Lanka proposed be designated as "zone of peace". He has chaired the committee when it was created in 1973. Also, since its creation in 1969, he has been Chairman of the Special Committee to Investigate Israeli Practices Affecting the Human Rights of the Population of the Occupied Territories.

In 1976, he became the President of the United Nations General Assembly Thirty-first session of the general assembly.

While serving as Permanent Representative, he held concurrent accreditation as Sri Lanka's Ambassador to Brazil.

He was re-elected chairman of the Conference on the Law of the Sea in 1980 after he had left Sri Lanka's delegation to the United Nations. The Economist styled him the two-million-dollar chairman, after the cost of the conference.

== Death ==
He died on 4 December 1980 in New York, USA. For his services for the Law of the Sea, a fellowship in his name has been created by the UN.

== See also ==
- Sri Lankan Non Career Diplomats

Diplomatic posts
Preceded by ?	Counsellor, Embassy of Ceylon in Washington, D.C. 1953–1955	Succeeded by ?
Preceded by Gaston Thorn	President of the United Nations General Assembly; 1976	Succeeded by Lazar Mojsov
Preceded by ?	Ceylon's High Commissioner to India; 1963–1965	Succeeded by ?
Preceded by ?	Ceylon's ambassador to Nepal; 1963–1965	Succeeded by ?
Preceded by ?	Ceylon's ambassador to Afghanistan; 1963–1965	Succeeded by ?
Preceded by ?	Ceylon's Permanent Representative to the UN; 1967–1980	Succeeded by ?
Preceded by ?	Sri Lankan Ambassador to Brazil; 1973–?	Succeeded by ?
