= Chelliah Thurairaja =

Sri Lankan physician

- Military career
- Branch: Sri Lanka Army
- Rank: Major General
- Unit: Sri Lanka Army Medical Corps
- Commands: Director, Army Medical Services, Colonel Commandant, Sri Lanka Army Medical Corps
- Conflicts: 1971 Insurrection, Sri Lankan Civil War, Insurrection 1987-89
- Awards: Uttama Seva Padakkama

Major General Dr. Chelliah Thurairaja, USP, SLMC was a Sri Lankan military physician, Sri Lankan Army general and sportsman. He was the former Director of Army Medical Services and Colonel Commandant of the Sri Lanka Army Medical Corps. A triple international in basketball, badminton and golf, he is the only Sri Lankan to represent the country in two sports disciplines at the Asian Games-in 1966 in basketball and in 1982 in golf, later winning the gold medal in golf at the World Masters Games 2002.

Educated at the Royal College, Colombo, where he was an all-round student taking part in cricket, rugby, basketball, badminton, athletics and boxing winning colours in four sports. He played in the Bradby Shield Encounter. Moving on to the University of Ceylon to study medicine and was one of the top ranked in his batch. He was the University sportsman of the year 1961–62.

A keep rugby player, he played for Havelock Sports Club in 1961, which year they won the Clifford Cup. His international rugby career included games against the Combined Universities and Barbarians as a member of the Defence Services rugby team. Dr Thurairaja captained the Ceylon basketball team. Dr Thurairaja won the gold medal in golf at the World Masters Games 2002 and captained the Asian Games contingent from Sri Lanka.

After completing his medical training and qualifying as a doctor, he joined the Ceylon Army in 1961 as a Capitan in the Medical Corp. His career in the army lasted 37 years, when he retired in 1998 as a Major General, the Head of the Medical Corp and Director of Army Medical Services as well as the Medical Advisor to the Sri Lankan Army. General Thurairaj has received the Uttama Seva Padakkama (USP) and the Sri Lanka Armed Services Long Service Medal.

Dr. Thurairaja is a qualified consultant radiologist and in sports medicine. He was the President of the Sri Lanka Sports Medicine Association, Vice-President of Asian Federation of Sports Medicine and an Executive Committee Member of the International Federation of Sports Medicine. He had also authored four manuals on sports medicine.

He was married to the late Menik Thurairaja (née Perera), and they have three children – Ruvi, Leisha and Michele, and is now married to Loret Thurairaja.
