= Samson Felix Amerasinghe =

Sri Lankan civil servant

Samson Felix Amerasinghe, OBE, CCS (7 July 1902 – 1987) was a Sri Lankan civil servant.

He entered Cambridge University, Trinity Hall after winning the prestigious Government Scholarship in 1921 and read classics, graduating with an honours degree. Amerasinghe joined the Ceylon Civil Service in 1926 by appointment of the Secretary of State for the Colonies.

He served as a cadet in the Kalutara Kachcheri and as the office assistant to Government Agent, Eastern Province. Promoted to Class 4 Officer, he served as a Police Magistrate in Dandagamuwa, Negambo, Kandy; office assistant at the Badulla and Kurunagala Kachcheri. In 1935 he was appointed Additional Assistant Government Agent of Colombo before spending time at the Summer School, Oxford. He thereafter served in the Food controllers office and did stints as Assistant Government Agent in Mannar, Vavuniya, Kegalle and Acting Government Agent Sabaragamuwa, Uva, North Central and Central Province.

He served as the Land Commissioner from 1948 to 1950, Permanent Secretary, Ministry of Agriculture and Lands from 1950 to 1952, Permanent Secretary, Ministry of Lands from 1952 to 1953, Permanent Secretary, Ministry of Commerce and Trade from 1954 to 1956 and Permanent Secretary to the Treasury from 1956 to 1961.

Amerasinghe was appointed an Officer of the Order of the British Empire (OBE) in the 1949 Birthday Honours. His brother C. W. Amerasinghe, was the Professor of Classics at the University of Sri Lanka (Peradeniya) and his cousin Hamilton Shirley Amerasinghe succeeded him as Permanent Secretary to the Treasury in 1961 and went on to become the first President of the Law of the Sea (UN) and Head of the General Assembly.

He married May Abeysundere, and the couple had five children: Kamini, Chittharanjan, Indrani, Deshapriya and Srinath. His granddaughter is cultural scholar and lawyer, Dame Shalini Amerasinghe Ganendra.
