= Herbert Clifford Serasinghe =

Brigadier Herbert Clifford Serasinghe, OBE, ED was a Ceylonese physician. He was first commanding officer of the Sri Lanka Army Medical Corps.

Serasinghe received his medical training at the Ceylon Medical College, where he gained a Licentiate in Medicine and Surgery. He joined the Ceylon Volunteer Medical Corps of the Ceylon Defence Force and was commissioned as a captain, serving during World War II. After the formation of the Ceylon Army, Serasinghe transferred to a regular commission as a major and took command of the newly Ceylon Army Medical Corps as it established its first General Military Hospital in Colombo. He retired from the army with the honorary rank of brigadier. He was appointed an Officer of the Order of the British Empire (OBE) in the 1954 Birthday Honours and had been awarded the Efficiency Decoration. In 1967, he was appointed an Officer of the Order of St John in 1967.
