= Herbert Eric Jansz =

Ceylonese civil servant

Sir Herbert Eric Jansz, CMG (13 November 1890 - March 1976) was a Ceylonese civil servant. He was member of the Senate of Ceylon, Parliamentary Secretary to the Minister of Finance (1948-1950) and Chairman, Public Service Commission.

He was appointed to the Ceylon Civil Service in September 1914 and served many capacities including Commissioner of Lands. He served as a member of the Delimitation Commission that demarcated the Parliamentary Constituencies under the Soulbury Constitution and was a member of the Cadres Commission. In 1947, he was appointed to the Senate of Ceylon and made the Parliamentary Secretary to the Minister of Education, before being made the Parliamentary Secretary to the Minister of Finance which he served until 1950, when he was succeeded by L. L. Hunter. In 1950, he was appointed Chairman of the Public Service Commission. Jansz was appointed a Companion of the Order of St Michael and St George in the 1946 New Year Honours for colonial administrative service on his retirement and was knighted in the 1953 New Year Honours as a Knights Bachelor.

He married Beatrice van Langenberg on 4 October 1928. He died in 1976 in Hendon in Middlesex.
