= Manilal Fernando =

Sri Lankan businessman

Vernon Manilal Fernando (born 13 October 1949, in Kalutara, Sri Lanka) is a Sri Lankan businessman and former international football official.

== Education ==
Manilal Fernando was educated at Tissa Central College Kalutara, Kalutara Vidyalaya and Ananda College, Colombo. In 1972 he became attorney at law and graduated.

== Career ==
From 1979 to 1999, Fernando was president of the Football Federation of Sri Lanka.

In 2011, he became the first Sri Lankan vice president of the FIFA Executive Committee by the Asian Football Confederation.

== FIFA's fraud case ==
During the Caribbean Football Union corruption scandal Fernando was suspended for 90 days from any soccer activity for his involvement in a 2011 bribery scandal.

In April 2013, Fernando was banned from any football activity for eight years. He was "found guilty of several breaches of the FIFA Code of Ethics" including bribery, conflicts of interest and accepting gifts.

In October 2013, Fernando was banned for life by FIFA following an appeal on a previous eight-year ban.

In March 2015, Fernando lost his appeal to The Court of Arbitration for Sport, which banned him for life for bribery in the 2009 Asian Football Confederation Congress election for a seat on the FIFA Executive Committee.
