= B. H. Dunuwille =

Sri Lankan politician

B. H. Dunuwille (1896 - ) was a Ceylonese legislator. He was a member Senate of Ceylon and served as its Deputy President (1947–70).

He was educated at Trinity College, Kandy and he became a proctor. His son Harindra Dunuwille, was the Mayor of Kandy, a Member of Parliament and State Minister of State for Constitutional Affairs. His brother-in law E. L. B. Hurulle was a Member of Parliament, Government Minister, Governor Central Province.

== See also ==
- List of political families in Sri Lanka
