= Cyril de Zoysa =

Sri Lankan industrialist, Senator and philanthropist

Sir Cyril de Zoysa ශ්‍රිමත් සිරිල් ද සොයිසා

President of the Senate of Ceylon
- In office 1960 - 1965

Personal details
- Born: 26 October 1896 Galle, British Ceylon
- Died: 2 January 1978 (aged 81)
- Education: Royal College, Colombo, Richmond College, St. Thomas' College, Matara
- Profession: Proctor

Sir Cyril de Zoysa (Sinhala: ශ්‍රිමත් සිරිල් ද සොයිසා) (26 October 1896 – 2 January 1978) was a Sri Lankan industrialist, Senator and a philanthropist. The President of the Senate of Ceylon from 1960 to 1965, he was a leader in the Buddhist revival movement in Ceylon (now Sri Lanka) in the 20th century. He was distantly related to Sri Lankan tycoon Sir Ernest de Silva.

== Early life and education ==
He was born on 26 October 1896 to Solomon and Harriet de Zoysa in Galle, and was their second son. His brother V. T. De Zoysa, who became an advocate, established Air Ceylon. He was educated at St. Thomas' College, Matara for his primary studies and then moved on to Richmond College in Galle. His father was a notary public and for this reason, de Zoysa moved many times during childhood. He completed his secondary education at Royal College, Colombo, where his contemporaries included Sir Nicholas Attygalle and Sir John Kotelawala. At the young age of twenty, he began pursuing his legal studies at Ceylon Law College. In 1921, he qualified as a proctor and started his legal practice at the police magistrates courts of Balapitiya. In 1926 he moved to Kalutara after five successful years of practice in Balapitiya. He was the President of the Law Society of Ceylon.

== Activism in Kalutara ==
The town of Kalutara was a centre of Buddhist learning and a pilgrimage site where people came to view the Kalutara Bodhi. He was the founder of Kalutara Vidyalaya and the Kalutara Balika Vidyalaya. In violation of colonial law, he began lighting lamps at the Kalutara Bodhi. The Bodhi tree was one of 32 allegedly brought to Sri Lanka by King Devanampiyatissa, as a scion of the Sri Maha Bodhi of Anuradhapura. When the colonial authorities came, they attempted to corral devotees away from the tree. They accosted De Zoysa, and De Zoysa challenged them to arrest him. He invested much of his own money into the project and created pilgrimage facilities for worshippers.

== Business ventures ==
De Zoysa was a successful businessman having a diverse array of ventures. During law school, he earned money by tutoring and used his first earnings to buy a buggy cart. He later reminisced, "I gifted this to my father, who blessed me for this act of love and generosity. I perceived that this gift I gave my father brought him immense joy. Likewise, this brought me too unforgettable joy.” In 1942, he established the South Western Bus Company, which was reconstituted as the South Western Omnibus Company Limited in 1952. It was nationalized in 1958 when the Ceylon Transport Board was formed. He established Associated Motorways Limited in 1949, one of the largest conglomerates of Ceylon. It used to manufacture Sisil refrigerators and motor vehicle tyres. He also established Associated Rubber Industries, Associated Batteries, Associated Vacu-lat and Associated Cables.

== Political career ==
De Zoysa was the Chairman of the Kalutara Urban Council and was elected to the Senate of Ceylon in 1947. He was elected Deputy President and Chairman of Committees in 1951 and served till 1955. He was elected President of the Senate of Ceylon in 1955 succeeding Sir Nicholas Attygalle and served till his retirement in 1961. He was made a Knights Bachelor in the 1955 Birthday Honours.
