= L. L. Hunter =

Ceylonese civil servant and politician (1890-?)

Louis Lucien Hunter, CMG (28 September 1890 - 19??) was a Ceylonese civil servant and politician. He served as the Parliamentary Secretary to the Minister of Finance (1950-1953), being a member of the Senate of Ceylon (1950-1953) and the House of Representatives (1953-1956).

== Education ==
Educated at Royal College, Colombo, he joined the Teacher Training College and gained a Trained Teachers' Certificate. He taught at the Teacher Training College from 1912 to 1914.

== Civil service career ==
Taking the Civil Service Examination in 1914, he passed first in the order of merit and joined the Ceylon Civil Service as a cadet. Having served in the Ceylon Civil Service from 1914 to 1936 in may parts of the island, he took early retirement in 1936 while serving as Government Agent of the North Central Province. He was recalled to service in 1940, and served as Additional Director of Agriculture, Additional Land Commissioner and Government Agent of the Western Province, before his final retirement in 1950. In the 1949 Birthday Honours, he was appointed a Companion of the Order of St Michael and St George for Colonial Administrative Service.

== Political career ==
In September 1950, Hunter was appointed to the Senate of Ceylon and made Parliamentary Secretary to the Minister of Finance succeeding Sir Herbert Eric Jansz and served in this capacity till June 1953. In July 1953, he was appointed to the House of Representatives by the Governor-General as one of six members to represent important interests which were not represented or inadequately represented in the House.

== Personal life ==
He married in 1915, Edith Constance Fretz, daughter of Arthur Henry Fretz, Colonial Surgeon. They had two daughters Phyllis Daphne Pereira and Dr Edith Maureen de Zilva. He is a Life Member of the Ceylon Red Cross Society.
