= Sri Lanka Army Medical Corps =

- Cap badge of the Sri Lanka Army Medical Corps
- Active: 1881 - present day
- Country: Sri Lanka
- Branch: Sri Lanka Army
- Type: Medical corps
- Role: Combat Support-Military Medicine
- Size: 5 Units
- Regimental Centre: Werahera
- Nickname: SLMC
- Engagements: World War I World War II; 1971 Insurrection; Insurrection 1987-89; Sri Lankan Civil War
- Website: https://alt.army.lk/slamc/

Commanders
- Colonel Commandant: Major General P S Subath Sanjeewa RSP nps psc
- Centre Commandant: Brigadier APADD Dharmakeerthi RWP RSP USP psc ptsc
- Notable commanders: Major General Dr. Chelliah Thurairaja, USP, SLMC

The Sri Lanka Army Medical Corps (SLAMC) (Sinhala: ශ්‍රී ලංකා යුද හමුදා වෛද්‍ය බලකාය Shri Lanka Yuddha Hamuda Vayidya Balakaya) is a specialist corps in the Sri Lanka Army which specializes in military medicine and provides medical services to all army personnel and their families in war and in peace. It is made up of 4 regular units and one volunteer unit. Headquartered in Colombo, formally at army headquarters. The corps Cap badge depicting the Rod of Asclepius. General officers and senior officers of the SLMC wear gorget patches of maroon rather than of scarlet worn by other officers of similar rank.

== History ==
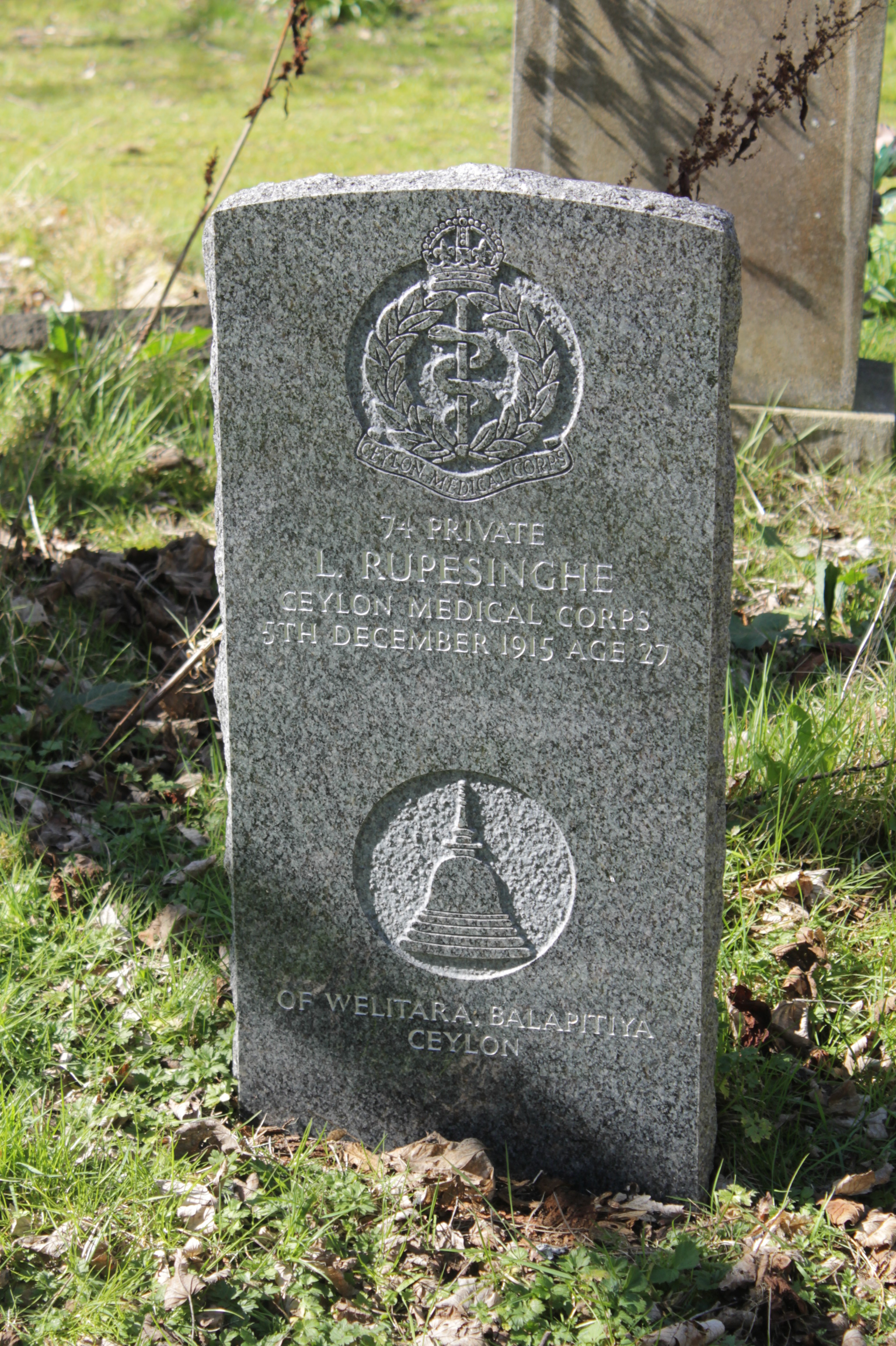
Ceylon Medical Corps war grave, Newington Cemetery, Edinburgh

The origins of the corps dates back to 29 July 1881 when a stretcher bearer company was raised as a part of the Ceylon Light Infantry Volunteers, which evolved into the Ceylon Volunteer Medical Corps (CVMC) of the Ceylon Defence Force serving in both world wars. With Ceylon gaining self rule in 1948 and the formation of the Ceylon Army in 1949, the CVMC became a part of the Ceylon Army Volunteer Force with Lt. Col. Sydney Jayawardene was the first commanding officer. In October 1950 the Ceylon Army Medical Corps (CAMC) was formed in the regular force of the Ceylon Army, with 3 medical officers, and 20 other ranks drawn from the wartime CVMC, under the command of Major H. C. Serasinghe. The CAMC established a 10-bed Medical Reception Station (MRS) at the General Military Hospital, Colombo operated by the Royal Army Medical Corps, which was later upgraded to a 50-bed service hospital in 1952. In 1961 a MRS were set up at the Army Training Centre, Diyatalawa. The first Regiment, CAMC was formed in 1965 and the CVMC became the 2nd (Volunteer) Regiment, CAMC with its personal serving during the 1971 JVP insurrection. The corps was renamed once again in 1972 as the Sri Lanka Army Medical Corps when Sri Lanka became a republic. With the onset of the Sri Lankan Civil War military base hospitals were established at the Palaly Military Base and at the Panagoda Cantonment in 1985. The Directorate of Army Medical Service was established in 1985. In 1997, a military base hospital was established in Anuradhapura. With civil war intensifying in the 1980s and 1990s the SLMC was expanded and deployed support combat operations and the high number of casualties.

== Hospitals ==
Since all three armed forces and the police maintain their medical services with their own hospitals, the corp is only responsible for maintaining and operating army medical facilities mainly focused on treatment of battle casualties. Apart from medical reception stations in almost all military stations these include;

Military Hospitals

- Colombo Military Hospital, Colombo
- University Hospital Kotelawala Defence University Hospital, Werahera
- Victory Military Hospital, Anuradhapura

Base Hospitals in

- Panagoda Cantonment
- Diyatalawa Garrison
- Palaly Military Base
- Ampara Military Base

== Units ==
=== Regular Army ===
- 1st Regiment, Sri Lanka Army Medical Corps (Regimental HQ SLAMC, Werahera)
- 3rd Regiment, Sri Lanka Army Medical Corps (Anuradhapura)
- 4th Regiment, Sri Lanka Army Medical Corps (Jaffna)
- 5th Regiment, Sri Lanka Army Medical Corps (Habarana)

=== Volunteers ===
- 2nd(V) Regiment, Sri Lanka Army Medical Corps (Panagoda Cantonment) (Formed on 29 July 1881)

=== Training Centres ===
- Sri Lanka Army Military School Of Nursing

== Notable members ==
- Frank Gunasekera - former deputy president of the Senate of Ceylon and commanding officer, Ceylon Medical Corps (1935-1939)
- Chelliah Thurairaja - former director Army Medical Services and colonel commandant of the SLAMC
- Sanjeewa Munasinghe - permanent secretary of the Ministry of Health, director general, Army Health Services, and colonel commandant of the SLAMC
- Dr. S.D.C. De Silva - former commanding officer, 1 SLAMC
- Herbert Clifford Serasinghe - former commanding officer, Ceylon Army Medical Corps
- Vincent Henry Ludovici Anthonisz - former commanding officer, Ceylon Medical Corps
- Rex De Costa - former commanding officer, Ruhunu Regiment and Vice President, World Veterans Federation
- Dr. John Rockwood, VD - former commanding officer, Ceylon Medical Corps
- H. I. K. Fernando - former director Army Medical Services and All Ceylon cricket player

== Order of precedence ==
Preceded by Sri Lanka Army Service Corps	Order of Precedence	Succeeded by Sri Lanka Army Ordnance Corps

== See also ==
- Sri Lanka Army

== External links and sources ==
- Sri Lanka Army
- Sri Lanka Army Medical Corps
