= S. M. H. Mashoor =

Ceylonese politician

S. M. H. Mashoor was a Ceylonese lawyer and politician. A proctor, he was a United National Party member of the Senate of Ceylon from 1965 to 1971.
