= Mohamed Shums Cassim =

Ceylonese politician (1896–1954)

Mohamed Shums Cassim, MBE (23 March 1896-20 May 1954) as a Ceylonese lawyer and politician. A proctor and notary, he was a United National Party member of the Senate of Ceylon from 1953 to 1954.

Born in Galle, the son of Rohani Cassim, a ship chandler from Weligama, and Fathuma née Makdoom. He was educated at Mahinda College and established his legal practice in Kurunegala. He was a member of the Urban Council and Road Development Committees of Kurunegala. He was appointed a Member of the Order of the British Empire (MBE) in the 1949 Birthday Honours for public services in Kurunegala. In 1953 he was appointed to the Senate of Ceylon. He married Sithy Vilcassim, the daughter of Muhammad Abdul Cader Vilcassim and Fathima Zohara, and they had and they had seven children. Cassim died on 20 May 1954.
