= Minister of Finance (Sri Lanka) =

Cabinet post in Sri Lanka

Minister of Finance of Sri Lanka
- මුදල්, ආර්ථික ස්ථායිකරණ සහ ජාතික ප්‍රතිපත්ති අමාත්‍ය நிதி, பொருளாதார நிலைப்படுத்தல் மற்றும் தேசிய கொள்கைகள் அமைச்சர்

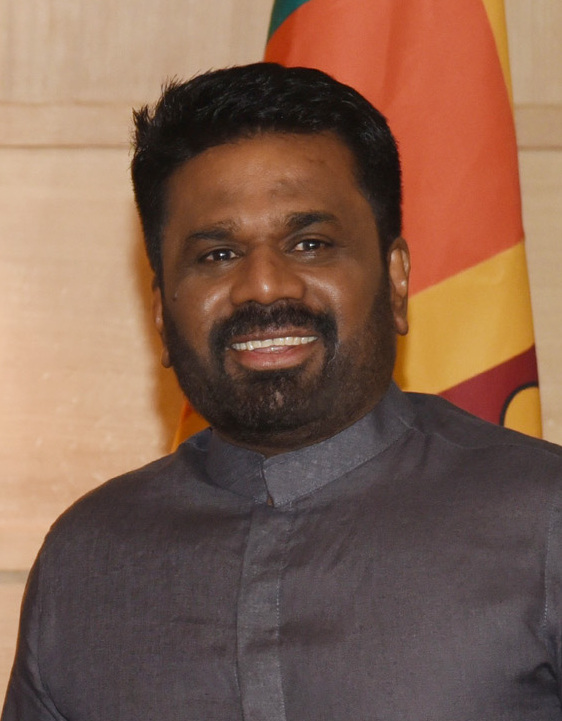
- Incumbent; Anura Kumara Dissanayake since 24 September 2024
- Ministry of Finance
- Appointer: The president on advice of the prime minister
- Inaugural holder: Junius Richard Jayewardene
- Formation: 26 September 1947
- Website: www.treasury.gov.lk

The minister of finance (Sinhala: මුදල්, ආර්ථික ස්ථායිකරණ සහ ජාතික ප්‍රතිපත්ති අමාත්‍ය; Tamil: நிதி, பொருளாதார நிலைப்படுத்தல் மற்றும் தேசிய கொள்கைகள் அமைச்சர்) is an appointment in the Cabinet of Sri Lanka. The post was created in 1947 when Ceylon gained independence as Sri Lanka.

== History ==
The position of Treasurer of Ceylon of the British Government of Ceylon dates back to the early nineteenth century and was succeeded by the post of Financial Secretary of Ceylon under the recommendations of the Donoughmore Commission. The post of Ministry of Finance and the Treasury of Ceylon was established in 1947 under the recommendations of the Soulbury Commission under the Ceylon Independence Act, 1947 and The Ceylon (Constitution and Independence) Orders in Council 1947. J.R Jayawardena became the first minister of finance of independence Ceylon. Over time, the ministry took over the policy planning which it currently undertakes.

Beginning 4 April 2022, Ali Sabry was appointed as the new minister, replacing Basil Rajapaksa (brother of President Gotabaya Rajapaksa) in the position. However, due to the worsening of the Sri Lankan economic crisis (2019–2024), Sabry tendered his resignation 5 April 2022, having served only a day in office. However, Sabry later decided to continue serving in the capacity of finance minister.

Prime Minister Ranil Wickremesinghe was appointed finance minister by President Gotabaya Rajapaksa. Upon assuming the presidency himself, Wickremesinghe remained finance minister.

== List of officeholders ==
=== Finance ministers ===
Parties

United National Party (10) Sri Lanka Freedom Party (9) Lanka Sama Samaja Party (1) Sri Lanka Podujana Peramuna (3) National People's Power (1)

Name	Portrait	Party	Tenure	Government	Ministerial title
Junius Richard Jayewardene (1st term)	Junius Richard Jayewardene	United National Party	26 September 1947 – 13 October 1953	Don Stephen Senanayake	Ministry of Finance and the Treasury of Ceylon
Junius Richard Jayewardene (1st term)	Junius Richard Jayewardene	United National Party	26 September 1947 – 13 October 1953	Dudley Senanayake	Ministry of Finance and the Treasury of Ceylon
Oliver Goonetilleke (1st term)	Oliver Goonetilleke	United National Party	14 October 1953 – 30 June 1954	John Kotelawala	Ministry of Finance and the Treasury of Ceylon
M. D. H. Jayawardena		United National Party	1 July 1954 – 18 February 1956	John Kotelawala	Ministry of Finance
Stanley de Zoysa		Sri Lanka Freedom Party	12 April 1956 – 22 November 1959	S. W. R. D. Bandaranaike	Ministry of Finance
Stanley de Zoysa		Sri Lanka Freedom Party	12 April 1956 – 22 November 1959	Wijeyananda Dahanayake	Ministry of Finance
M. M. Mustapha		Sri Lanka Freedom Party	22 November 1959 – 5 December 1959	Wijeyananda Dahanayake	Ministry of Finance
Oliver Goonetilleke (2nd term)	Oliver Goonetilleke	United National Party	21 March 1960 – 23 April 1960	Dudley Senanayake	Ministry of Finance
J. R. Jayewardene (2nd term)	Junius Richard Jayewardene	United National Party	24 April 1960 – 20 July 1960	Dudley Senanayake	Ministry of Finance
Felix Dias Bandaranaike (1st term)		Sri Lanka Freedom Party	21 July 1960 – 24 August 1962	Sirimavo Bandaranaike	Ministry of Finance
C. P. de Silva		Sri Lanka Freedom Party	28 August 1962 – 8 November 1962	Sirimavo Bandaranaike	Ministry of Finance
P. B. G. Kalugalla		Sri Lanka Freedom Party	9 November 1962 – 10 May 1963	Sirimavo Bandaranaike	Ministry of Finance
T. B. Ilangaratne		Sri Lanka Freedom Party	29 May 1963 – 10 June 1964	Sirimavo Bandaranaike	Ministry of Finance
N. M. Perera (1st term)		Lanka Sama Samaja Party	11 June 1964 – 17 December 1964	Sirimavo Bandaranaike	Ministry of Finance
U. B. Wanninayake		United National Party	27 March 1965 – 25 March 1970	Dudley Senanayake	Ministry of Finance
N. M. Perera (2nd term)		Lanka Sama Samaja Party	10 May 1970 – 2 September 1975	Sirimavo Bandaranaike	Ministry of Finance
Felix Dias Bandaranaike (2nd term)		Sri Lanka Freedom Party	3 September 1975 – 18 May 1977	Sirimavo Bandaranaike	Ministry of Finance
Ronnie de Mel		United National Party	23 July 1977 – 18 January 1988	Junius Richard Jayewardene	Ministry of Finance
M. H. M. Naina Marikar		United National Party	18 January 1988 – 3 January 1989	Ranasinghe Premadasa	Ministry of Finance
Dingiri Banda Wijetunga		United National Party	18 February 1989 – 31 August 1994	Ranasinghe Premadasa	Ministry of Finance
Dingiri Banda Wijetunga		United National Party	18 February 1989 – 31 August 1994	Dingiri Banda Wijetunga	Ministry of Finance
Chandrika Kumaratunga	Chandrika Kumaratunga	Sri Lanka Freedom Party	30 September 1994 – 5 December 2001	Dingiri Banda Wijetunga	Ministry of Finance
Chandrika Kumaratunga	Chandrika Kumaratunga	Sri Lanka Freedom Party	30 September 1994 – 5 December 2001	Chandrika Kumaratunga	Ministry of Finance
K. N. Choksy	K. N. Choksy	United National Party	12 December 2001 – 2 April 2004	Chandrika Kumaratunga	Ministry of Finance
Sarath Amunugama	Sarath Amunugama	Sri Lanka Freedom Party	14 April 2004 – 22 November 2005	Chandrika Kumaratunga	Ministry of Finance
Mahinda Rajapaksa	Mahinda Rajapaksa	Sri Lanka Freedom Party	23 November 2005 – 9 January 2015	Mahinda Rajapaksa	Ministry of Finance
Ravi Karunanayake		United National Party	12 January 2015 – 22 May 2017	Maithripala Sirisena	Ministry of Finance
Mangala Samaraweera		United National Party	22 May 2017 - 17 November 2019	Maithripala Sirisena	Ministry of Finance
Mahinda Rajapaksa	Mahinda Rajapaksa	Sri Lanka Podujana Peramuna	22 November 2019 – 8 July 2021	Gotabaya Rajapaksa	Ministry of Finance
Basil Rajapaksa		Sri Lanka Podujana Peramuna	8 July 2021 – 4 April 2022	Gotabaya Rajapaksa	Ministry of Finance
Ali Sabry		Sri Lanka Podujana Peramuna	4 April 2022 – 9 May 2022	Gotabaya Rajapaksa	Ministry of Finance
Ranil Wickremesinghe		United National Party	25 May 2022 – 23 September 2024	Gotabaya Rajapaksa	Ministry of Finance
Ranil Wickremesinghe		United National Party	25 May 2022 – 23 September 2024	Ranil Wickremesinghe	Ministry of Finance
Anura Kumara Dissanayake		National People's Power	24 September 2024 - Present	Anura Kumara Dissanayake	Ministry of Finance

=== Parliamentary secretaries ===
- Herbert Eric Jansz 17.05.1948 10.09.1950
- Louis Lucien Hunter 20.09.1950 02.04.1952
- Louis Lucien Hunter 02.06.1952 29.04.1953
- M. D. H. Jayawardena 19.10.1953 01.07.1954
- U. B. Wanninayake 01.07.1954 27.04.1955
- Chandradasa Wijesinghe 25.04.1956 10.09.1958
- Nimal Karunatilake 18.11.1958 19.05.1959
- Meeralebbe Poddy Mohamed Mustapha 25.06.1959 22.11.1959
- Dayasena Pasqual 22.11.1959 05.12.1959
- George Rajapaksa 29.07.1960 20.06.1962
- R. S. V. Poulier 28.08.1962 06.05.1963
- Mudiyanse Tennakoon 30.05.1963 12.03.1964
- James Peter Obeyesekere III 22.06.1964 17.12.1964
- Noel Wimalasena 29.03.1965 25.03.1970

=== Deputy ministers ===
- Neal de Alwis 01.10.1975 04.02.1977
- Festus Perera 23.07.1977 05.02.1978
- M. H. M. Naina Marikar 06.02.1978 19.01.1988
- John Amaratunga 19.01.1988 09.01.1989
- Harold Herath 18.02.1989 28.03.1999
- Harold Herath 30.03.1990 15.08.1994
- Jeyaraj Fernandopulle 01.09.1994 12.11.1994
- G. L. Peiris 24.11.1994 09.08.2000
- G. L. Peiris 16.08.2000 10.10.2000
- G. L. Peiris 25.11.2000 13.09.2001
- S. B. Dissanayake 25.11.2000 13.09.2001
- Mangala Samaraweera 14.09.2001 07.12.2001
- Bandula Gunawardane 12.12.2001 07.02.2004
- Ranjith Siyambalapitiya 14.04.2004 26.04.2010
- Sarath Amunugama 17.01.2009 26.04.2010
- Chandrasiri Gajadeera 27.04.2010 21.11.2010
- Sarath Amunugama 10.05.2010 21.11.2010
- Gitanjana Gunawardena 26.11.2010 - 2015
- Ajith Nivard Cabraal 2020 - 2021

== See also ==
- Ministry of Finance, Economic Stabilization and National Policies
