= Walter Godsall =

British colonial administrator (1901–1964)

Walter Godsall CMG
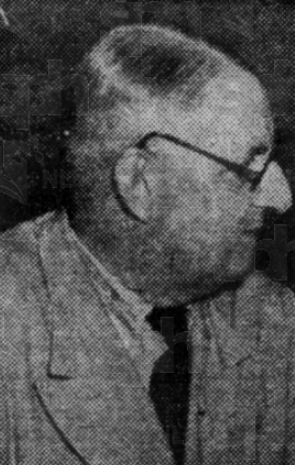
- Godsall in 1950

Financial Secretary to the Malayan Union and to the Federation of Malaya
- In office 1946–1952
- Preceded by: Post created
- Succeeded by: E. Himsworth

Personal details
- Born: 26 January 1901
- Died: 16 October 1964 (aged 63)
- Children: 3
- Education: Worcester College, Oxford
- Occupation: Colonial administrator

Walter Douglas Godsall (26 January 1901 – 16 October 1964) was a British colonial administrator who served as Financial Secretary to the Malayan Union and the Federation of Malaya from 1946 to 1952.

== Early life and education ==
Godsall was born on 26 January 1901, the son of Walter Godsall and Fanny Mary Chinn. He was educated at Bromsgrove School and Worcester College, Oxford.

== Career ==
Godsall joined the Colonial Service as an Eastern Cadet in the Indian Civil Service in 1923 after competitive examination, and went to Ceylon where he served in various administrative posts. From 1933 to 1934, he was attached to the Colonial Office, and in 1935 was appointed Controller of Establishments at the General Treasury of Ceylon. In 1939, he served as Secretary of the Public Services Commission and also Chief Censor of Ceylon, while also being called on to act as assistant Chief Secretary. In 1940, he returned to the post of Controller of Establishments to the General Treasury of Ceylon before he was appointed Controller of Finance and Supply in 1942 and then Controller of Finance and Accounts of Ceylon.

After World War II, Godsall went to Malaya in 1945, and served as Controller of Finance and Accounts with the British Military Administration, having been granted an emergency commission as second lieutenant. He was appointed Financial Secretary of the Malayan Union on its inception in April 1946 and then Financial Secretary of the Federation of Malaya on its establishment in February 1948. From April to September 1952, he was called on to act as Chief Secretary to the Federation Government.

While in office he succeeded in resolving many complex financial problems which arose as a result of the War and the Japanese occupation of Malaya, and later as a result the Malayan Emergency which required a rapid expansion of police and local forces. He was able to secure substantial loans on financial markets to keep the administration going and, following talks in London, from the British government towards the cost of Federation's defence and security which in 1949 amounted to half of the annual cost of the Emergency.

During his final budget speech in the Legislative Council in November 1952 before retiring, he received many tributes from fellow members, "Not so long ago our financial situation was very grave, and it must have caused Mr Godsall very great worry. The nerve he displayed in solving the problems was considerable, but he got us out of our troubles."

After leaving Malaya in 1952, Godsall was appointed to the salaries commission of the East African and Somaliland Protectorates in 1953. In 1954, he was transferred to Kenya where he served for a year as chairman of the Civil Service Commission before he was sent to Hong Kong to conduct a civil service salary review. After going to Nigeria to carry out an enquiry into the organisation of the national electricity corporation, his final posting was in 1956 with the Salaries Commission in Barbados.

== Personal life and death ==
Godsall married Anne Jane MacDonald in 1926 and they had three daughters.

Godsall died on 16 October 1964, aged 63.

== Honours ==
Godsall was appointed Companion of the Order of St Michael and St George (CMG) in the 1949 Birthday Honours.

Government offices
New office	Financial Secretary to the Malayan Union and to the Federation of Malaya; 1946–1952	Succeeded by E. Himsworth
