= Ralph Henry Bassett =

British colonial administrator (1896–1962)

Ralph Henry Bassett CMG CBE
- Born: 16 February 1896
- Died: 18 July 1962 (aged 66)
- Education: University of Nottingham
- Occupation: Colonial civil servant
- Years active: 1920–1951
- Children: 3 daughters

Ralph Henry Bassett CMG CBE (16 February 1896 – 18 July 1962) was a British colonial civil servant in British Ceylon who served as Permanent Secretary to the Ministry of Industries and Fisheries, Ceylon Government.

== Early life and education ==
Bassett was born on 16 February 1896, the son of Rev H.J.Bassett, vicar of East Kirkby, Lincolnshire. He was educated at Haileybury College and University of Nottingham. He served with the Duke of Cornwall's Light Infantry (1914–1919) during the European War and attained the rank of captain.

== Career ==
Bassett joined the Colonial Administrative Service in 1920 as a cadet. The following year he went to Ceylon and served in various administrative and legal posts including Assistant Government Agent; Assistant Settlement Officer; Police Magistrate, Colombo, and Deputy Public Prosecutor.

During the early 1930s, he established the Marketing Department, Ceylon Government, and was appointed Marketing Commissioner responsible for promoting national products. In 1935, he toured India as Ceylon's trade representative to develop Ceylon trade. He served for many years as Permanent Secretary of the Ministry of Industries and Fisheries, Ceylon Government.

Bassett retired to England and from 1951 to 1961 served as Chief Civil Defence Officer for South Gloucestershire.

== Personal life and death ==
Bassett married Norah Madden and they had three daughters. He served as a member of the British Colonial Auxiliary Forces and was awarded the Long Service Medal.

Bassett died on 18 July 1962, aged 66.

== Publications ==
- Romantic Ceylon: Its History, Legend, and Story (1930)
- The Rare Romances of Nariya the Jackal (1933)
- The Mechanized Historian (1950)

== Honours ==
Bassett was appointed Companion of the Order of St Michael and St George (CMG) in the 1951 Birthday Honours. He was appointed Officer of the Order of the British Empire (OBE) in the 1943 Birthday Honours, raised to Commander of the Order of the British Empire (CBE) in the 1949 Birthday Honours.
