= Frank Gunasekera =

Ceylonese physician and surgeon

Sir Frank Gunasekera

Senator of Ceylon

Personal details
- Education: Royal College, Colombo

Sir Frank Arnold Gunasekera (born 1880s), CBE, ED was a Ceylonese physician and surgeon. He was elected a Deputy President of the Senate of Ceylon in 1948.

== Early life and education ==
Born to a prominent family, Gunasekera's father worked for the Wharfage Company, and Gunasekera had two younger brothers, Eric, who became headmaster of Wesley College, Colombo, and Donald, who also worked for the Wharfage Company.

He was educated at the Royal College, Colombo and at the Ceylon Medical College, where he gained his Licentiate in Medicine and Surgery (LMS). He took further medical studies in the United Kingdom, gaining Membership (MRCS) of the Royal College of Surgeons of Edinburgh, Royal College of Physicians and Surgeons of Glasgow and Licentiate of the Royal College of Physicians (LRCP). His brothers were Eric Gunasekera and Donald Gunasekera; the former was headmaster of Wesley College, Colombo.

== Medical career ==
Gunasekera joined the Ceylon Medical Service and served in the Ceylon Medical Corps as a medical officer. He served as its commanding officer from 1935 to 1939 with the rank of lieutenant colonel.

== Political career ==
Gunasekera was elected a member of the Colombo Municipal Council from 1940 to 1944. Appointed to the Senate of Ceylon in 1947, he was elected its Deputy President in 1948 and served till 1951.

== Honors ==
For his volunteer military service he was awarded the Efficiency Decoration and the appointed Commander of the British Empire in the 1948 Birthday Honours. He was knighted as a Knights Bachelor in the 1950 New Year Honours

The Sir Frank Gunasekera Trophy is awarded annually at the cricket match between Royal College Colombo and Wesley College, Colombo, which has been played since 1893. The Sir Frank Gunasekera Trust is one of the largest donors of the National Diabetes Centre.
