= John Woods (civil servant) =

Senior British civil servant

Sir John Harold Edmund Woods, GCB, MVO (20 April 1895 – 2 December 1962) was a senior British civil servant. He was Permanent Secretary to the Ministry of Production from 1943 to 1945, and to the Board of Trade from 1945 to 1951. He was therefore responsible for maintaining production during the Second World War, and then managing (and winding down) post-war controls and increasing the United Kingdom's exports. He had been Principal Assistant Secretary at HM Treasury between 1940 and 1943, overseeing expenditure for the armed forces during the Second World War. Woods was appointed MVO in 1930, CB in 1943, KCB in 1945 and GCB in 1949.
