= N. M. Appuhamy =

Member of Sri Lanka Senate

N. M. Appuhamy was a Ceylonese businessman. He was an elected member of the Senate of Ceylon from the United National Party.
