= Peri Sundaram =

Ceylonese politician (1890–1957)

Peri Sundaram (July 23, 1890 – February 4, 1957), born Periannan Sundaram, was a Ceylonese lawyer, trade unionist and politician. He was the first Minister of Labour Industries and Commerce in the State Council of Ceylon and Deputy President of the Senate of Ceylon.

Educated at Trinity College, Kandy and at S. Thomas' College, Mount Lavinia, he entered the Ceylon Law College. Thereafter he went on to the University of Cambridge graduating with an MA and LLB. At Cambridge, he was the President of the Cambridge Indian Majlis and committee member of the Cambridge Union Society. In 1916 he became a barrister and thereafter on his return he became an advocate of the Supreme Court of Ceylon. He was a lecturer and acting principal of the Ceylon Law College and served as examiner in law to the Ceylon Civil Service.

He became a founding member of the Ceylon National Congress in 1919, and was elected to the first State Council from the Hatton electorate uncontested in 1931. In the State Council, he served as first Minister of Labor Industries and Commerce from 1931 to 1936. In 1939 he formed the first trade union in the country, Workers Welfare League and served as its founder secretary. He was also the first secretary of the Ceylon Workers’ Federation. In 1939 he co-founded the Ceylon Indian Congress which became the Ceylon Workers Congress of which he became president. In 1940, he became president of the Ceylon Indian Congress Labour Union, the largest trade union in the country. In 1947 he was appointed to the Senate of Ceylon and made its Deputy President.
