= Rangika Halwatura =

Sri Lankan researcher

Rangika Umesh Halwatura (born 4 February 1978) is a researcher, academic and inventor at the University of Moratuwa and currently the youngest professor in Civil Engineering Science in Sri Lanka.

== Early life and education ==
Halwathura was born 4 February 1978 in Kalutara, Sri Lanka. He was raised in a family of four consisting of his parents and his younger brother, Shanaka Halwathura, a Sri Lanka Army officer. He attended Kalutara Vidyalaya. Halwathura graduated with first class honours from University of Moratuwa with a bachelor's of science in engineering. He later completed his doctorate degree in structural and building services engineering in 2008 from the same institution.

== Career ==
As of 2017, Halwathura is recognized as the youngest professor of Civil Engineering in Sri Lanka.

== Personal life ==
Halwatura married to doctor Charitha Poruthota in 2004. Together, they have two daughters, Pamoda and Ranoda.

== Honours ==
In 2016, Halwatura received the Committee of Vice-Chancellors and Directors's (CVCD) Most Outstanding Young Researcher award. He also won the Sri Lanka 2016 Energy Globe Award. Halwatura was nominated by the National Academy of Sciences and subsequently won the 2017 The World Academy of Sciences Young Scientist Award.
