= M. J. C. Amarasuriya =

Sri Lankan banker and philanthropist

Mahendra Amarasuriya
- Born: Sri Lanka
- Occupation(s): Chairman, Commercial Bank of Ceylon
- Website: mahendraamarasuriya.com

Mahendra J. C. Amarasuriya is a Sri Lankan banker and philanthropist. A former president of the Lions Clubs International, he was the former chairman of the Commercial Bank of Ceylon.

== Early life ==
Mahendra Amarasuriya was born to Thomas Amarasuriya, OBE the President of the Senate of Ceylon. He was educated at the Royal College, Colombo and graduated from the University of Ceylon with a BSc. He has undergone training at the International Institute for Management Development.

== Career ==
Amarasuriya was first appointed to the Board of the Commercial Bank of Ceylon on May 15, 1986 and appointed Chairman on January 1, 1995 and is serving to date. He holds 447,097 Voting shares and 151,881 Non-Voting Shares.

He is also the Chairman of Pelwatte Sugar Industries Ltd., Serendib Flour Mills (Pvt) Ltd., Equity Investments Lanka Ltd., Unawatuna Beach Resorts Ltd. and the Lions Clubs International Foundation. Immediate Past President of the International Association of Lions Clubs and Past Chairman of United Motors Lanka PLC, Joint Business Forum of Chambers of Commerce and Industry, Employers’ Organisation and Trade Associations of Sri Lanka (JBIZ), the Employers’ Federation of Ceylon, National Agribusiness Council International Chamber of Commerce, Sri Lanka, Commercial Fund Management (Pvt) Ltd. and Regional Industries Services Committee of the North Western Province. He was the Former Deputy Chairman of Hayleys.

Almost four decades after his father chaired the Association, Amarasuriya took the chairmanship and continued in his family's long association with Sri Lanka's thriving tea business.

A devout Buddhist and philanthropist, Amarasuriya is a committee member of the Jaya Sri Maha Bodhi Fund. In 2006 he was elected President of the Lions Clubs International.
