= Reginald Waite =

- Born: 30 June 1901
- Died: 7 May 1975 (aged 73)
- Military career
- Allegiance: United Kingdom
- Branch: Royal Air Force
- Service years: 1920–53
- Rank: Air Commodore
- Commands: RAF Nassau (1942–44); No. 111 (Coastal) Operational Training Unit (1942–44); RAF St Eval (1942); No. 224 Squadron (1937–38)
- Conflicts: Second World War
- Awards: Companion of the Order of the Bath; Commander of the Order of the British Empire; Mentioned in dispatches

Air Commodore Reginald Newham Waite, CB, CBE (30 June 1901 – 7 May 1975) was a senior officer in the Royal Air Force during the middle of the 20th century.

Waite joined the RAF in 1920, receiving his initial instruction as a flight cadet at the RAF College Cranwell in Lincolnshire.

In 1948, while Waite was Head of Disbandment at the headquarters of the Allied Control Commission, he suggested that the Berlin Blockade could be broken by an airlift. Subsequently, the British and Americans started a joint operation to circumvent the Russian blockade of all overland routes.
