= Gerard Wijeyekoon =

Ceylonese lawyer and politician

Sir Gerard Wijeyekoon (5 May 1878 – 21 September 1952) was a Ceylonese lawyer and a politician. He was the first President of the Senate of Ceylon.

Born Abraham Charles Gerard Wijeyekoon, he was educated at Wesley College, Colombo and Royal College, Colombo he became an advocate of the Supreme Court in 1902. He served as a Crown Counsel, Magistrate and District Judge and was elected to the Legislative Council of Ceylon in 1921 from the Central Province. He was knighted as a Knights bachelor in the 1941 New Year Honours list, for public services in Ceylon.

His sons were both Oxford educated lawyers. The eldest Major General H.W.G. Wijeyekoon was the second Ceylonese Commander of the Ceylon Army and the youngest Neville Wijeyekoon was the founding Chairman of the Ceylon Ceramic Corporation.
