= Chandradasa Wijesinghe =

Sri Lankan planter, businessman and politician

Chandradasa Sarath Wijesinghe was a Sri Lankan planter, businessman and politician. He was the President of the Senate and a Cabinet Minister.

Born to Muhandiram D. F. Wijesinghe and Mrs. S. L. Goonatillake Wijesinghe, who were wealthy plantation and graphite mine owners from Kamburupitiya, Wijesinghe was educated at the Royal College, Colombo and became a planter, managing his estate group of companies which included estates in many districts including the Andapana Estate in Kamburupitiya. He was chairman of several companies including Ceylon Glass Company and Ceylon Chocolates Ltd. He built Andapana Hospital and later handed it over to the government. He was appointed an Officer of the Order of the British Empire (OBE) in the 1953 New Year Honours for his social services in the Southern Province.

He unsuccessfully contested the Akuressa Electoral District in the 1952 general election from the United National Party and was defeated by Doreen Young Wickremasinghe. In 1956, he was appointed to the Senate of Ceylon and served as Parliamentary Secretary to the Minister of Finance from April 1956 to September 1958 in the S. W. R. D. Bandaranaike government, then he was appointed Cabinet Minister of Nationalized Services and Shipping from September 1958 to December 1959. From July 1960 to 1962 he served as Minister of Labour and Nationalised Services. From 1960 to 1965, he served as the President of the Senate.

The businessmen Upali Wijewardene was his nephew.
