= Arthur George Peart =

Brigadier Arthur Peart OBE

Personal details
- Born: Arthur George Peart; 30 March 1915 Dublin
- Died: 11 March 1999 (aged 83) Lymington
- Education: Jesus College, Cambridge; Royal Military Academy, Woolwich

Military service
- Branch/service: British Army
- Years of service: 1935–1966
- Rank: Brigadier
- Unit: Royal Engineers
- Commands: 28 Engineer Regiment; 36 Engineer Regiment; 25 Engineer Group
- Battles/wars: Second World War

Brigadier Arthur George Peart OBE (30 March 1915 – 11 March 1999) was a British Army officer during World War II and Deputy Engineer-in-Chief at the War Office.

== Early life and family ==
Born on 30 March 1915 to John Redmond Peart, a Dublin solicitor, and Matilda Mary Macnamara, Peart was educated at St Gerard's School, Stonyhurst College and Jesus College, Cambridge followed by RMA Woolwich with a three-year interlude, completing three years of basic engineer training, at Chatham.

In 1940, Peart married Elizabeth Helen Watson, daughter of James Arthur Watson, WS, Town Clerk of Nairobi.

== Military career ==
Peart was commissioned into the Royal Engineers in 1935. In 1938, he was posted to Singapore, and in 1940 was promoted to Captain, second-in-command of an independent company for Commando-type service in southern Norway.

In 1941, as a Major, Peart was granted command of a field company but soon joined the operational planning branch of the War Office in late 1942. In early 1944, Peart undertook a series of foreign assignments in Ceylon, Burma, Singapore and Hong Kong as part of Lord Mountbatten's staff as a Lieutenant Colonel. Later that year, he worked closely with Winston Churchill in orchestrating the D-Day landings.

After the war, Peart was in charge of the rehabilitation of Singapore and, in 1947, was awarded an O.B.E. for his services in Ceylon, Burma, Singapore and Hong Kong.

In 1966, Peart was posted as a Major General with an overseas posting but chose retirement instead.

== Retirement ==
Peart became a director of a civil engineering firm in the Midlands, specialising in building bridges, multistorey car parks and opencast coalmining, before moving to Lymington. He subsequently built up one of the finest stamp collections of the West Indies, becoming an authority on the Queen Victoria Leeward Islands' stamps and postmarks, about which he gave lectures and wrote a number of reference books. The entire collection was stolen during a comprehensive burglary in 1990 — on Easter Sunday, on his birthday, whilst he was at church.

Due to a trapped nerve, Peart gradually became unable to walk. Ten years later, he moved to Court Lodge nursing home where he died peacefully in his sleep on 11 March 1999.
