= S. D. S. Somaratne =

Ceylonese lawyer

S. D. S. Somaratne was a Ceylonese lawyer and a film producer. He was the Deputy President of the Senate of Ceylon. He was the Chairmen of the Kandyan Peasantry Commission.
