= Thomas Amarasuriya =

Sri Lankan planter and politician (1907–1979)

Thomas Amarasuriya, OBE (17 June 1907 – 5 May 1979) was a Ceylonese planter and politician. He was a member of the State Council of Ceylon and President of the Senate of Ceylon. He was the first Ceylonese Chairman of the Planters Association and a brother of H. W. Amarasuriya.

Thomas Amarasuriya was born on 17 June 1907 at Amaragiri Walauwa to the wealthy Amarasuriya family in Unawatuna, Galle. His father Henry Mahendrapala Amarasuriya was a proprietor, shipping merchant and independence activist. His mother was Caroline de Silva. Both his grandfathers Muhandiram Thomas de Silva Amarasuriya and Juanis de Silva were wealthy businessman of Galle. His elder brother was Henry Woodward Amarasuriya. He had two other brothers; Francis and Buddhadasa and three sisters Susima, Irene and Amara. Amarasuriya attended Mahinda College, Galle, his grandfather being one of its founders, and later joined Ananda College. At Ananda he played soccer and tennis for the school and was a leading light in the debating team. He studied agriculture at Wye College, England and took over the management of some of the extensive plantations of his parents. The Amarasuriyas were pioneers of low-country tea.

In 1932 he married Lucille Gwendoleen Lois, the daughter of M. J. C. Fernando, the well known Buddhist leader of Moratuwa and founder of Moratu Maha Vidalaya. From 1932 he took to politics and was elected to the Galle Municipal Council which he served for 10 years. During this period he was instrumental in moving for the establishment in 1939 of a Vagrants Home in Galle. He was a member of the executive committee of the Ceylonese Merchants Chamber and of the Lanka Mahajana Sabha. He was a member of the board of management of the Galle Industrial Institute and the president of the YMBA and also a member of the Friend-in-Need Society, Galle. In 1942 Amarasuriya became the vice president of the Moratuwa Maha Jana Sabha. He allocated funds for extension work to the Princess Louise Hospital that had been donated by Sir Charles Henry de Soysa. In 1953 he was elected a member of the Senate of Ceylon and was appointed Officer of the Order of the British Empire (OBE) in the 1953 Coronation Honours for his services for the plantation industry. Earlier a member of the United National Party, Senator Amarasuriya resigned from that party in 1959 and joined the Sri Lanka Freedom Party and late Mr. S. W. R. D. Bandaranaike. On 5 November 1963 he was unanimously elected President of the Senate, which post he held until his retirement in 1965. In 1956 the Planters Association of Ceylon broke a 102-year-old tradition to elect Senator Thomas Amarasuriya as the first Ceylonese chairman. He was also the president of the Rotary Club of Colombo and served as the vice president Buddhist Theosophical Society.

He died on 5 May 1979 at the age of 72. He had five daughters and three sons including Hemaka Amarasuriya, Mahendra Amarasuriya and Sepala Amarasuriya. All Ceylon cricket captain Sargo Jayawickrama was his cousin.
