= Senate of Ceylon =

Upper parliament of Ceylon (1947–1971)

Senate
- Dominion of Ceylon

Type
- Type: Upper house

History
- Established: 1947
- Disbanded: 2 October 1971
- Preceded by: State Council of Ceylon
- Succeeded by: None
- Seats: 30

Meeting place
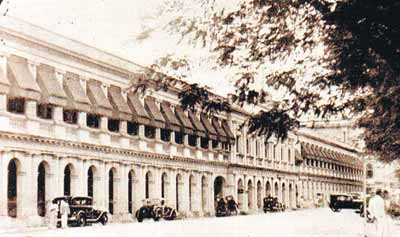
- The old Legislative Council building in Colombo Fort that used to house the Senate. Today it is known as the Republic Building and houses the Ministry of Foreign Affairs.

The Senate was the upper chamber of the parliament of Ceylon (now Sri Lanka) established in 1947 by the Soulbury Commission. The Senate was appointed and indirectly elected rather than directly elected. It was housed in the old Legislative Council building in Colombo Fort and met for the first time on 12 November 1947. The Senate was abolished on 2 October 1971 by the eighth amendment to the Soulbury Constitution, prior to the adoption of the new Republican Constitution of Sri Lanka on 22 May 1972. In 2010 there were proposals to reintroduce the Senate.

== History ==
=== Creation ===
With the recommendations of the Soulbury Commission, the Senate was established in 1947 as the upper house of Parliament of Ceylon. The Senate was modelled on the House of Lords in the United Kingdom. It was a thirty-member Senate where the members where appointed rather than elected. One of its fundamental aims was to act as a revising chamber by scrutinizing or amending bills that had been passed by the House of Representatives. This was intended to act as a stopgap barrier to prevent the government in power trying to rush through important legislations without giving adequate time to consider such legislations.

=== Abolition ===
The leftist parties of Ceylon and other republicans considered the Senate, with half its members being appointed by the British monarch's representative – the Governor General – to be one of the last vestiges of colonial rule. The Senate had also been dominated by the United National Party since its creation. Soon after the United Front, an alliance consisting of the Sri Lanka Freedom Party, the main opposition party, and the leftist parties, came to power as a result of the May 1970 election, found that the Senate was controlled by the opposition party. The United Front government faced the possibility of their legislation been delayed in the upper house and it would take 27 months before it could appoint a majority of its members into the Senate with the retirement of sitting Senators. Therefore, it brought in a parliamentary bill to abolish the Senate. The bill's second reading was passed by the House of Representatives on 21 May 1971. The Senate met for the last time on 28 September 1971. The Ceylon (Constitution and Independence) Amendment Act, No. 36 of 1971 received Royal Assent on 2 October 1971, becoming the eighth amendment to the Soulbury Constitution. The Senate was abolished in 1971 after nearly 24 years of existence. A unicameral parliamentary system was introduced with the adaptation of the Republican Constitution of Sri Lanka in 1972.

== Role ==
The Senate was intended to act as a revising chamber, scrutinizing and amending bills which had been passed by the House of Representatives. The model for the Senate's role was the House of Lords in the United Kingdom.

All parliamentary bills other than money (finance) bills could originate in the Senate. The Senate could not reject or amend or delay beyond one month a money bill. If any other bill that had been passed twice by the House of Representatives was rejected by the Senate twice it was deemed to have been passed by both chambers.

== Membership ==
The Senate consisted of 30 members. 15 members were elected by the lower chamber, the House of Representatives, using the proportional representation system, each member of parliament having a single transferable vote. The remaining 15 members were appointed by the Governor-General of Ceylon on advice of the Prime Minister and generally consisted of distinguished individuals. The senators were known as "Elected Senators" and "Appointed Senators" respectively.

The minimum age for membership of the Senate was 35, and members of the House of Representatives were not allowed to be members of the Senate. At least two government ministers had to be senators. No more than two senators could be parliamentary secretaries (deputy ministers).

The normal term of office of a senator was six years. One third of the Senate (five elected and five appointed) retired every two years. Retiring senators were eligible for re-election or re-appointment. If a senator resigned, died or was otherwise removed from office, their replacement, elected or appointed, would serve the remainder of their term of office.

== Officers ==
As the tradition of the House of Lords, the Senate did not elect its own speaker. Instead, the presiding officer was the president, who was appointed by the Governor General. The president was by the deputy president and chairman of committees, who served as the presiding officer in the absence of the president.

The clerk of the Senate was in charge of all its administrative duties, but was not a member. The clerk, who was appointed by the Crown, advised the presiding officer on the rules of the House, signed orders and official communications, endorsed bills, and was the keeper of the official records of both Houses of Parliament.

The gentleman usher was also an officer of the Senate. The title derived from the gentleman usher of the Black Rod of the House of Lords and was responsible for ceremonial arrangements, upon the order of the House, took action to end disorders or disturbances in the Senate chamber.

== See also ==
- Parliament of Sri Lanka
- State Council of Ceylon
- Legislative Council of Ceylon
