= Jayewardene family =

The Jayewardene family
- Current region: Colombo
- Origin: India (tondai nadu)
- Connected families: Wijewardene family Tudugalage family
- Traditions: Theravada Buddhism Historically: Hinduism or Catholicism
- Estates: Braemar, Vaijantha

The Jayewardene family is a Sri Lankan family that is prominent in law and politics. Along with many members who have been successful politician across generations, the family includes Presidents and Prime Ministers of Sri Lanka.

== History ==
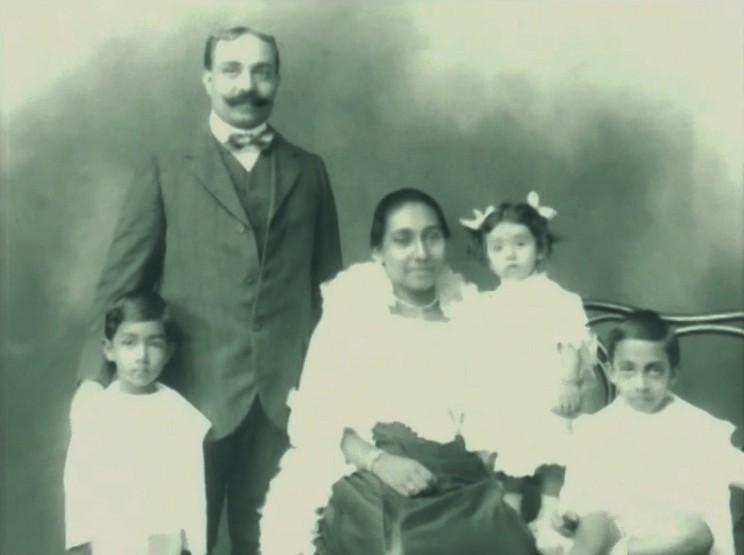
Eugene Wilfred Jayewardene with his family.

A paternal ancestor of the Jayewardene family has been traced to Don Adrian Wijesinghe Jayewardene, a descendant from a Dutch lascreena army soldier family that had emigrated to Sri Lankan from the Coromandel Coast during the Kandyan period and settled close to Dutch-controlled Colombo. Don Adrian married a Sinhalese by the name of Jayewardene from the village of Welgama near Hanvalla taking the name Jayewardene. Don Adrian was employed as a spy for the Dutch East India Company and was captured by the British. He was speared from an immediate execution, which was the custom for captured spies. With the withdrawal of the Dutch, Don Adrian was employed by the British as a spy master, gathering intelligence during the regular skirmishes along the Kandyan boarder. He was part of Major General Hay MacDowall's entourage during MacDowall's embassy to the Kingdom of Kandy in 1800. He took part in the disastrous British expedition to Kandy in 1803 as part of the advance guard and was richly rewarded by the British with lands in Chilaw confiscated from Don Herat Seneviratna, Mudaliyar of Chilaw who had fled to the Kandyans, following Don Adrian was appointed Mudaliyar of Chilaw in 1804 establishing the family links to Madampe in Chilaw. In 1815, he had been appointed as Tombi Mudaliyar, in charge of the guides and intelligence agents and trusted aid of John D'Oyly who was the mastermind behind the overthrow Sri Vikrama Rajasinha, the last King of Kandy. He retired from the post of Mudaliyar of Chilaw in 1824 due to ill health with the titular rank of Mudaliyar and a pension. He died on 18 February 1830 the 15th anniversary of the capture of Sri Vikrama Rajasinha. He was buried at Wolvendaal Church with honors of a captain of native militia.

Don Adrian's son Don Abraham Jayewardene succeeded his father's ownership of his Walauwa in Grandpass, lands in Chilaw and served as the Mudaliyar of the Chilaw Kachcheri. He retired early and was briefly implicated in the Matale rebellion. His children from his first wife including James Alfred Jayewardene were disinherited and James Alfred established a successful legal practice as a proctor. He died at the age of 43 in 1888 and the family relied on the income from the families estates from his wife's side. His sons Hector Alfred, Eugene Wilfred (EW), and John Adrian St. Valentine entered the legal profession and the latter two serving as judges of the Supreme Court of Ceylon, while Theodore Godfrey became an engineer and soldier. EW and Theodore Godfrey married heiresses who were daughters of Muhandiram Tudugalage Don Phillip Wijeywardene and Mudaliyar Don Charles Gemoris Attygalle, joining the Jayewardene family to the wealthy Wijewardene and Attygalle families. Through the latter the Jayewardenes were connected by marriage to the Senanayake family and the Kotelawala, influencing twentieth century politics in Sri Lanka, having formed and dominated the United National Party. EW's sons Junius Richard (JR) and Hector Wilfred (HW) followed their father to the legal profession. JR who married the heiresses Elina Bandara Rupasinghe entered politics as Ceylon gained independence becoming its first Minister of Finance in the government of D. S. Senanayake. He would serve as a member of parliament and serve as a senior minister for the next three decades before being elected as Prime Minister in 1977 and appointment as the first executive President of Sri Lanka in 1978, serving till his retirement in 1989.

== Family Tree ==
- Tombi Mudaliyar Don Adrian Wijesinghe Jayewardene (1768–1830) + Suraweera Aarachchige Don Simange Dona Dinesia
  - Mudaliyar Don Abraham Wijesinghe Jayewardene (1801–1866)
    - James Alfred Jayewardene (c. 1845 – 1888), Deputy Coroner of Colombo + Cornelia Matilda Wijekoon
      - Hector Alfred Jayewardene, (1870 - 1913), member of the Colombo Municipal Council
      - Colonel T. G. Jayewardene (1872–1945), Member of State Council + Lena Attygalle (daughter of Mudaliyar Don Charles Gemoris Attygalle)
        - Major T. F. Jayewardene, Member of Parliament
      - Justice Eugene Wilfred Jayewardene, KC (1874–1932), Justice of the Supreme Court + Agnes Helen Don Philip Wijewardene (sister of D. R. Wijewardena)
        - J. R. Jayewardene (1906–1996), President of Sri Lanka, Prime Minister of Sri Lanka, Government Minister, Member of Parliament, Member of State Council + Elina Bandara Rupasinghe
          - Captain Ravi Jayewardene (1936 - 2017), National Security Adviser
            - Pradeep Jayewardene, Member of Colombo Municipal Council
        - Hector Wilfred Jayewardene, QC (1916–1990), Member at the United Nations Commission on Human Rights
      - John Adrian St. Valentine Jayewardene (1877 – 1927), Justice of the Supreme Court
        - Clodagh Jayasuriya, Member of Parliament

Other members of the family include;

- F. R. Senanayake
- Sir John Lionel Kotelawala
- Richard Gotabhaya Senanayake
- Ranil Wickremesinghe

== See also ==
- List of political families in Sri Lanka
