= Wijewardene family =

Sri Lankan family

The Wijewardene family
- Current region: Colombo
- Origin: Sedawatte
- Members: Don Richard Wijewardena, Junius Richard Jayewardene, Ranil Wickremesinghe, Ruwan Wijewardene, Upali Wijewardene, Eugene Wilfred Jayewardene, Esmond Wickremesinghe, Vimala Wijewardene
- Traditions: Theravada Buddhism
- Estates: Rickman House, Colombo, Arcadia, Diyatalawa, Adisham Hall

The Wijewardene family is a Sri Lankan family that is prominent in enterprise and politics. Along with many members who have been successful politicians across generations, the family includes two Chief Justices, two Prime Ministers and two Presidents of Sri Lanka.

== History ==
Tudugalage Don Phillip Wijewardene gained success as a timber merchant having established the Sedawatte Mills, after moving to his mother's village of Sedawatte near the banks of the Kelani river which was used to transport timber. He became a supplier of timber, bricks and sand to public works and the military undertakings of the colonial government and invested in real estate. He was awarded the title of Muhandiram and took the name of Wijewardene at the turn of the century. His sons continued his business ventures, with Don Richard Wijewardena branching out into print media having established Associated Newspapers of Ceylon Limited. After it was nationalized by Sirimavo Bandaranaike's government, Don Richard Wijewardena's son, Ranjith Wijewardene established Wijeya Newspapers in 1979.

== Family Tree ==
- Tudugalage Muhandiram Don Phillip Wijeywardene - Muhandiram + Dona Helena Dep Weerasinghe
  - Don Richard Wijewardena (1886–1950) + Alice Meedeniya
    - Ranjith Wijewardene + Ranjani Senanayake (of the Senanayake family)
      - Ruwan Wijewardene (1975–), Member of Parliament, Cabinet Minister
      - Irushi Wijewardene (1972–) + Shastha Bulathsinhala
        - Shakun Bulathsinhala (2002–)
    - Nalini Wijewardene + Esmond Wickremesinghe
      - Shan Wickremasinghe (1947–), Founder of Sri Lankan television
      - Ranil Wickremasinghe (1949–), President of Sri Lanka, Prime Minister of Sri Lanka, Government Minister, Member of Parliament
    - Rani Wijewardene + George Gomes
      - Shalini Gomes + Themiya Loku Bandara Hurulle, Member of Parliament, Project Minister (Science and Technology)
    - Seewali Wijewardene + Siri Wijewardene
      - Rohan Wijewardene + Ianthe Wijewardene
        - Savan Wijewardene + Surekha Yadav
        - Khema Wijewardene
      - Varini Wijewardene + Tony Anghie
      - Anil Wijewardene + Shyama Fernando
        - Saskia Wijewardene
        - Aquinne Wijewardene
    - Kusuma Wijewardene + Lal Gooneratne
      - Ayoma Gooneratne
      - Arjun Gooneratne + Roshini Wijewardene(Gooneratne)
      - Amitha Gonneratne
      - Arushi Gooneratne + Nihal Wadugodapitiya
  - Don Charles Wijewardene (1893–1956) + Vimala Wijewardene, Member of Parliament, Minister of Health
    - Padmini Wijewardene
    - Rukmani Wijewardene + C Beligammana
      - Sarojini Beligammana + Asanga Weerakoon
        - Rayshan Weerakoon
        - Leonie Weerakoon
    - Ananda Wijewardene
  - Don Walter T Wijewardene (1894–1939) + Anula Kalyanawathi Wijesinghe
    - Upali Wijewardene (1938–1983) + Lakmini Ratwatte
    - Kalyani Wijewardene (193?–2010) + Dr Gamini Attygalle, FRCS (brother of General Sepala Attygalle)
      - Sudhammika Attygalle
    - Anoja Devi Wijewardene (1933–2014) + Prof Stanley Wijesundera (1923–1989)
      - Rohan Wijesundera
      - Shalitha Wijesundera, Member of the Western Provincial Council
      - Deepthi Wijesundera
      - Lakmini Wijesundera
  - Don Phillip Alexander Wijewardene + Neeva Hulugalle
    - Iranganie Wijewardene + Donald Joseph Wijewardene
      - Nelun Kumari Wijewardene + William Tissa "Tommy" Ellawala
      - Amari Wijewardene, Ambassador to the United Kingdom
  - Dr Don Edmund Wijewardene + Dr Corin Amanda Jennings
    - Dr Phillip Revatha "Ray" Wijewardene - Chancellor University of Moratuwa + Seela de Mel (Grand daughter of Jacob De Mel
      - Anoma Wijewardene
      - Roshini Wijewardene + Arjun Gooneratne
      - Mandy Wijewardene + Suresh Mudannayake
    - Pamela Manel Wijewardene + Vernon Wijetunga, QC
  - Agnes Helen Wijewardene + Eugene Wilfred Jayewardene (1874–1932), Justice
    - Junius Richard Jayewardene (1906–1996), President of Sri Lanka, Prime Minister of Sri Lanka, Government Minister, Member of Parliament, Member of State Council
    - Hector Wilfred Jayewardene (1916–1990)
  - Don Luis Wijewardene + Muriel Godamunne
    - Donald Joseph Wijewardene + Iranganie Wijewardene
      - Nelun Kumari Wijewardene + William Tissa "Tommy" Ellawala
      - Amari Wijewardene - Ambassador to the United Kingdom
    - Semitha Wijewardene + Victor Tennekoon, Chief Justice
      - Dayanthi Tennekoon + Dayantha Athulathmudali
  - Don Gary Wijewardene + Helen Rajapakshe
    - Maitreepala Wijewardene + Seela Herath
      - Nilantha WIjewardene + Deepika Godaliyadde
        - Thenuda Wijewardene
        - Kinoli Wijewardene

Other members of the family include;

- Sir Henry De Mel
- J. H. Meedeniya Adigar

== See also ==
- List of political families in Sri Lanka
