= Rolly Jayewardene =

Rolly Jayawardene
- Born: Sri Lanka
- Education: Royal College, Colombo
- Occupation: Physician

Rolland "Rolly" P. Jayawardene, FRCP (1918 – November 11, 1999) was a Sri Lankan physician. He was the Director-General of the Natural Resources Energy and Science Authority.

He was born to Hon. Justice Eugene Wilfred Jayewardene KC, a Chief Justice of Ceylon and Agnes Helen Don Philip Wijewardena, daughter of Tudugalage Muhandiram Don Philip Wijewardena, a wealthy merchant. His brothers were President J. R. Jayewardene and Dr Hector Wilfred Jayewardene, QC. His uncles were the Colonel Theodore Godfrey Wijesinghe Jayewardene, Justice Valentine Jayewardene and the press baron D. R. Wijewardena.

Educated at Royal College, Colombo, he graduated from the Colombo Medical College. Joining the Ceylon Medical Service, went on to gain an MD from the University of London as well as Membership (MRCP) and Fellowship (FRCP) of the Royal College of Physicians becoming a Senior Physician of the General Hospital, Colombo. He was appointed Director-General of the Natural Resources Energy and Science Authority which was later replaced by the Natural Science Foundation.

He was married to Dr Gladys Jayawardene the first female Director of the Medical Research Institute and Chairman of the State Pharmaceutical Corporation. She was assassinated by the Janatha Vimukthi Peramuna (JVP) for importing Indian medicines.
