= Jayanthi Pushpa Kumari =

First lady of Sri Lanka

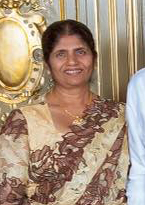
- Jayanthi Pushpa Kumari in 2017

7th First Lady of Sri Lanka
- In role 9th January 2015 – 18 November 2019
- Preceded by: Shiranthi Rajapaksa
- Succeeded by: Ayoma Rajapaksa

Personal details
- Born: Dominion of Ceylon
- Spouse: Maithripala Sirisena
- Children: 3

Jayanthi Pushpa Kumari is a Sri Lankan public figure who served as the First Lady of Sri Lanka from 2015 to 2019, as the wife of President Maithripala Sirisena.

== As First Lady ==
Kumari became First Lady of Sri Lanka following the election of her husband, Maithripala Sirisena, as president in January 2015. She held the position until the conclusion of his presidential term in November 2019.

As First Lady of Sri Lanka, she accompanied her husband on several overseas trips, including a visit to the United States in 2018.

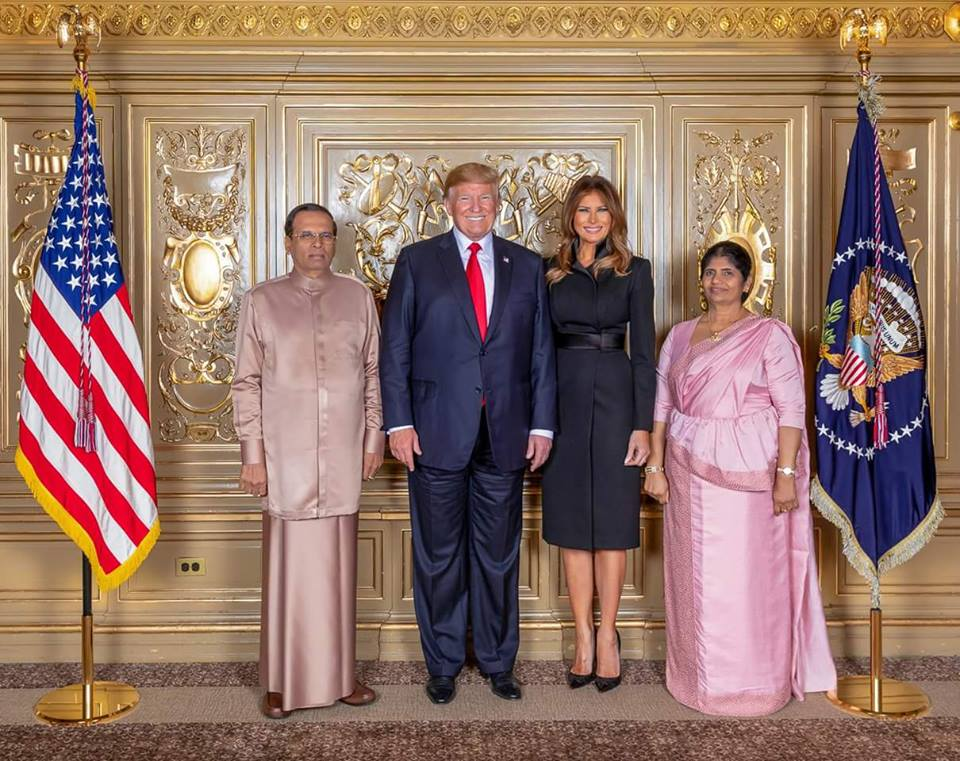
Maithripala Sirisena and Jayanthi Sirisena with Donald Trump and Melania Trump

Kumari was involved in promoting gender equality and addressing domestic violence against women. She also contributed to policy-making aimed at preventing domestic violence and improving the protection of women.

== Personal life ==
Kumari is married to Maithripala Sirisena, they have two daughters, Chathurika, Dharani, and a son, Daham. Kumari's date of birth is not disclosed.

Their daughter Chathurika Sirisena launched her first booked title Janadhipathi Thaththa in 2017. This is the first biography written by a daughter of a president of Sri Lanka. The book, which was praised for its command of Sinhala, was later revealed to have been ghostwritten by an employee of Media Gang, a marketing agency owned by Chathurika Sirisena. Meanwhile, Sirisena's son, Daham, has been cited in multiple assaults and been named in leading a mob attack on a nightclub. Charges against him have been since withdrawn.
