= Elina Jayewardene =

Politician in Sri Lanka

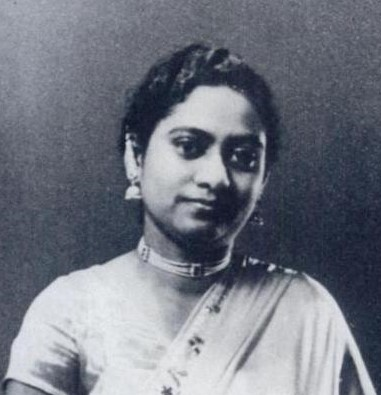

2nd First Lady of Sri Lanka
- In role 4 February 1978 – 2 January 1989
- Preceded by: Seelawathie Gopallawa
- Succeeded by: Hema Premadasa

Personal details
- Born: Elina Bandara Rupasinghe; 15 December 1913 Colombo, British Ceylon
- Died: 17 November 2007 (aged 93) Colombo, Sri Lanka
- Spouse: J. R. Jayewardene (m. 1935; died 1996)
- Children: Ravindra "Ravi" Vimal Jayewardene

Elina Jayewardene (née Bandara Rupasinghe; 15 December 1913 – 17 November 2007) was a Sri Lankan heiress and social worker, who served as the First Lady of Sri Lanka from 1978 to 1989, as the wife of President Junius Richard Jayawardene.

Born as Elina Bandara Rupasinghe, to Gilbert Leonard Rupasinghe, a Notary Public who was a successful businessman, and his wife Nancy Margaret Suriyabandara, she was educated at home, and she went on to marry J. R. Jayewardene, who was an Advocate, on 28 February 1935. Ravindra "Ravi" Vimal Jayewardene, their only child, was born soon after. Elina and her husband settled at Jayewardene's parents house Vaijantha, and later moved to their own house Braemar in 1938, where they remained the rest of their lives, when not holidaying at Pradeep Jayewardene House in Mirissa.

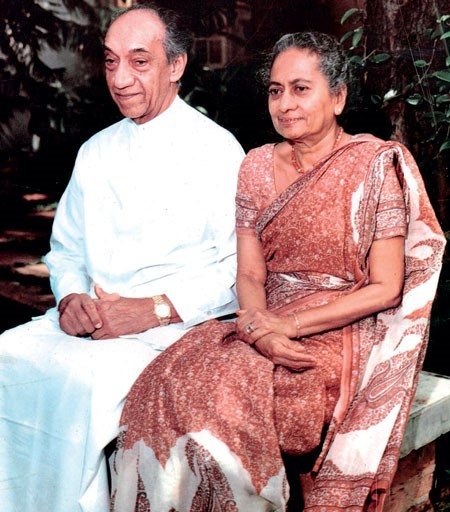
Elina with her husband, President Junius Richard Jayawardene on their 50th wedding Anniversary in 1985.

Elina Jayewardene died on 17 November 2007 at the age of 93.
