= Gopallawa =

Gopallawa (Sinhala: ගොපල්ලව, romanized: Gopallava) is a Sinhalese surname. Notable people with the surname include:

- Mahen Gopallawa, Sri Lankan judge of the Court of Appeal
- Monty Gopallawa (1941–2005), Sri Lankan politician, cabinet minister and governor
- Seelawathie Gopallawa (died 1977), First lady of Sri Lanka
- William Gopallawa (1896–1981), The last Governor-General of Ceylon and the first President of Sri Lanka
