= Thomas Villiers =

Thomas Villiers may refer to:

- Thomas Villiers, 1st Earl of Clarendon (1709–1786), British peer, Postmaster General and Chancellor of the Duchy of Lancaster
- Thomas Villiers, 2nd Earl of Clarendon (1753–1824), British peer and Member of Parliament
- Thomas Hyde Villiers (1801–1832), British politician
- Thomas Villiers Lister (1832-1902), British diplomat
- Thomas Lister Villiers (1869–1959), British planter in Ceylon

== See also ==
- Tommy Villiers, one half of piri & tommy
