= First Lady of Sri Lanka =

Spouse of the president of Sri Lanka

- ශ්‍රී ලංකා ජනාධිපති ආර්යා இலங்கை முதல் பெண்மணி
- Incumbent; Mallika Dissanayaka since 23 September 2024
- Residence: President's House
- Inaugural holder: Seelawathie Gopallawa
- Formation: 22 April 1972

First Lady of Sri Lanka (Sinhala: ශ්‍රී ලංකා ජනාධිපති ආර්යා, romanized: Śrī Laṃkā Janādhipathi Aryā; Tamil: இலங்கை முதல் பெண்மணி, romanized: Ilankai Mutal Peṇmaṇi) refers to the wife of the President of Sri Lanka. In recent years the holders of the title have been formally or informally referred to by the title First Lady or First Lady of Sri Lanka, though there are no provisions for such in the constitution.

To date, there have been eight women who have served in the role. The current first lady of Sri Lanka is Mallika Dissanayaka, wife of President Anura Kumara Dissanayake, who has held the position since 23 September 2024. There have been no first gentlemen of Sri Lanka to date, since former president Chandrika Kumaratunga, the country's only female head of state, was a widow while in office.

== Origins ==
The office of the president of Sri Lanka was created in 1972 when Sri Lanka became a republic. William Gopallawa, who was the governor-general of Ceylon at the time, became the country's inaugural president. His wife, Seelawathie Gopallawa, became the first wife of a president of Sri Lanka. When J. R. Jayewardene became the next president, his wife was known as Lady Elina Jayewardene during and after his presidency. During the presidency of Ranasinghe Premadasa, his wife Hema Premadasa took on a very viable role and became a public figure unlike before.

Chandrika Kumaratunga who was president from 1994 to 2005 was a widow as her husband, film star Vijaya Kumaratunga, was assassinated in 1987. When Mahinda Rajapaksa became president, his wife Shiranthi Rajapaksa took a higher profile role, using the title of first lady and becoming a public figure during her husband's presidency, with her own naval aide and staff funded by the Presidential Secretariat.

== List ==
#	Image	First Lady	Birth	Marriage	President (Husband, unless noted)	Tenure began	Age at tenure start	Tenure ended	Length of retirement	Death	Lifespan	Notes
1		Seelawathie Gopallawa (née Rambukwella)		8 March 1928	William Gopallawa	1972		1977†	0 days	4 October 1977		
–	Position vacant				William Gopallawa	Position fell vacant upon the death of Seelawathie Gopallawa.						
2		Elina Jayewardene (née Rupasinghe)	15 December 1913	28 February 1935	J. R. Jayewardene	1978	64 years, 51 days	1989	18 years, 319 days	17 November 2007	93 years, 337 days	
3		Hema Premadasa (née Wickrematunge)	27 October 1934	23 June 1964	Ranasinghe Premadasa	1989	54 years, 67 days	1993	33 years, 200 days	Living	92 years, 21 days	
4		Wimalawathi Kumarihami			Dingiri Banda Wijetunga	1993		1994				
–	Position vacant				Chandrika Kumaratunga	Kumaratunga's husband, Vijaya Kumaratunga, was assassinated in 1988 before she became president.						
5		Shiranthi Rajapaksa (née Wickramasinghe)	23 January 1953	1983	Mahinda Rajapaksa	2005	52 years, 300 days	2015	11 years, 312 days	Living	73 years, 298 days	
6		Jayanthi Pushpa Kumari		1970s	Maithripala Sirisena	2015		2019	6 years, 364 days	Living		
7		Ayoma Rajapaksa			Gotabaya Rajapaksa	2019		2022	1,587 days	Living		
8		Professor Maithree Wickremesinghe (née Wickremasinghe)	11 August 1964	1994	Ranil Wickremasinghe	2022	57 years, 343 days	2024		Living	62 years, 98 days	
9		Mallika Dissanayake		1994	Anura Kumara Dissanayake	2024				Living		

== See also ==
- President of Sri Lanka
