= Shiranthi Rajapaksa =

Politician in Sri Lanka

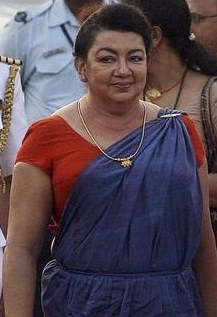
- Shiranthi Rajapaksa in 2010

6th First Lady of Sri Lanka
- In role 19 November 2005 – 9 January 2015
- Succeeded by: Jayanthi Pushpa Kumari

Personal details
- Born: Shiranthi Wickremasinghe; 12 January 1953 Badulla, Uva Province, Dominion of Ceylon
- Spouse: Mahinda Rajapaksa (m.1983)
- Children: Namal (b. 1986); Yoshitha (b. 1988); Rohitha (b. 1989)
- Parent: E. P. Wickremasinghe (father)

Shiranthi Rajapaksa (née Wickremasinghe; born 23 January 1953) is a Sri Lankan educator and former model who served as the First Lady of Sri Lanka from 2005 to 2015, as the wife of President Mahinda Rajapaksa.

== Early life ==
Rajakpaksa was born on 12 January 1953 in Badulla to Violet Wickramasinghe and naval officer E. P. Wickremasinghe. In her youth, Rajapaksa worked as a hotel receptionist. She was selected as Miss Sri Lanka and competed in the Miss Universe 1973 and Miss World 1973 pageants.

== Career ==
She is the founder of the Carlton Schools of Sri Lanka, a group of six preschools in Colombo, Beliatta, Ranna, Walasmulla, Tangalle and Weeraketiya.

During her husband's presidency, she operated the Carlton Siriliya Saviya Foundation, a non-governmental organization which promotes peace and development. Later administrations accused Rajapaksa of using the foundation's bank accounts fraudulently. In October 2026, she was arrested as part of an investigation into the alleged misuse of 10 million rupees ($30,300) of donations collected by the foundation meant for the Lady Ridgeway Hospital for Children. She was later granted bail after a court reviewed her medical records that indicated she may require bypass surgery.

== Relations ==
Her elder brother, Nishantha Wickramasinghe, was previously the chairman of SriLankan Airlines, while her younger brother, Srimal Wickramasinghe, was appointed Sri Lanka’s High Commissioner to Seychelles in 2021. She has three sons with her husband.

== Faith ==
Rajakpaksa was raised Catholic, but converted to Buddhism prior to her marriage. In 2007, she was recognized as an "Outstanding Woman in Buddhism" by the International Women's Meditation Center Foundation. However, sources in the 2010s described her as a "devout Catholic".
