= T. F. Jayewardene =

Sri Lankan politician (1911-?)

Hon. Major Theodore Frederick Jayewardene

Member of the Ceylon Parliament for Colombo South
- In office November 1948 – February 1956
- Preceded by: R. A. de Mel
- Succeeded by: Bernard Soysa

Personal details
- Born: 25 March 1911
- Party: United National Party
- Spouse: Philis née Gunesekera
- Relations: Theodore Godfrey Wijesinghe (father), Lena née Attygalle (mother)
- Children: Thileka (daughter)
- Profession: Planter

Military service
- Branch/service: Ceylon Defence Force
- Rank: Major
- Unit: Ceylon Light Infantry
- Battles/wars: World War II

Major Theodore Frederick "Freddy" Jayewardene (25 March 1911 – ?) was a Ceylonese planter and politician. He was the Parliamentary Secretary to the Minister for Labour and Member of Parliament for Colombo South from 1948 to 1956.

== Early life and family ==
Born to Colonel T. G. Jayewardene and Lena Jayewardene née Attygalle, daughter of Mudaliyar Don Charles Gemoris Attygalle, Jayewardene was related to three major political families that would play a significant role in the pre- and post-Independence era of Ceylon. His cousins Sir John Kotelawala and Dudley Senanayake, became Prime Ministers and Junius Richard Jayewardene became the President of Sri Lanka. Jayewardene became a planter, businessmen, and rural sociologist.

== Military service ==
Early on in his youth, he was commissioned as a Second Lieutenant in the Ceylon Light Infantry in 1933 as a volunteer officer in the Ceylon Defence Force. Reaching the rank of Major, he saw active service in the World War II.

== Political career ==
A founding member of the United National Party, Jayewardene was first elected to parliament in 1948, as a result of a by-election in the Colombo South electorate in November that year, following the dismissal of the sitting member, Reginald Abraham de Mel. He represented the United National Party and secured 5,997 votes (39% of the total vote) against the independent candidate P. Saravanamuttu. Jayewardena was re-elected at the 2nd parliamentary election, held between 24 May 1952 and 30 May 1952, where he received 10,918 votes (59% of the total vote) and 5,180 votes clear of his nearest rival. Jayewardena was appointed as parliamentary secretary to the Minister for Labour in the First Dudley Senanayake cabinet. He lost the seat of Colombo South at the 3rd parliamentary election, held between 5 April 1956 and 10 April 1956, losing to the Lanka Sama Samaja Party candidate, Bernard Soysa by 5,044 votes.

== Family ==
Jayewardene married Philis née Gunesekera, and their daughter Thileka married Cecil Waidyaratne, who became a General and the Commander of the Sri Lankan Army. His brother-in-law who had married his sister Margie was A. F. Wijemanne, who served as the Minister of Justice in the late 1960s.
