= Maithree Wickremesinghe =

First Lady of Sri Lanka and academic (born 1964)

Maithree Wickremasinghe
- මෛත්‍රී වික්‍රමසිංහ
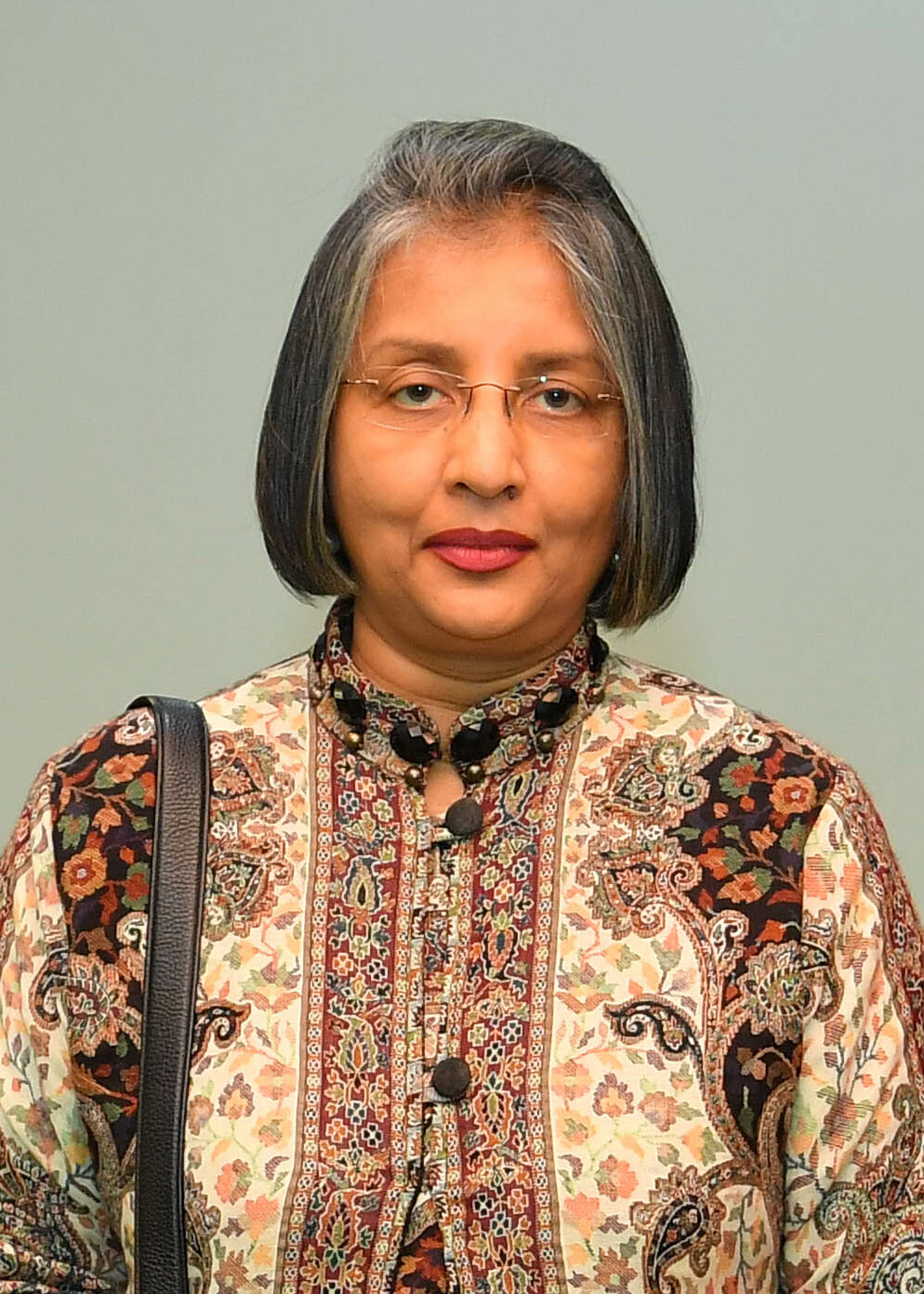
- Wickremesinghe in 2023

8th First Lady of Sri Lanka
- Assumed role 21 July 2022 – 23 September 2024
- President: Ranil Wickremesinghe
- Preceded by: Ayoma Rajapaksa
- Succeeded by: Mallika Dissanayaka

Second Lady of Sri Lanka
- In role 12 May 2022
- Preceded by: Ayoma Rajapaksa
- In office 15 December 2018
- Preceded by: Shiranthi Rajapaksa
- Succeeded by: Ayoma Rajapaksa
- In office 9 January 2015
- Succeeded by: Shiranthi Rajapaksa

Personal details
- Born: 11 August 1964 (age 62) Nawala, Dominion of Ceylon
- Spouse: Ranil Wickremesinghe (m. 1994)
- Education: Musaeus College, Colombo
- Alma mater: King's College London; University of Colombo; University of London
- Occupation: Professor
- Work Institutions: University of Kelaniya
- Field: Gender and women's studies

Professor Maithree Wickremesinghe (Sinhala: මෛත්‍රී වික්‍රමසිංහ; born 11 August 1964) was the First Lady of Sri Lanka as the wife of President Ranil Wickremesinghe. She is a Sri Lankan academic, writer, and professor of English at the University of Kelaniya. She specialises in gender and women's studies.

Wickremesinghe is the founding director of the Centre for Gender Studies at the University of Kelaniya and a visiting professor on gender and women's studies at other educational institutions including the University of Colombo and University of Sussex. She has focused on gender equity and equality policy strategies, conducting gender sensitisation trainings, and evaluating women's and gender programs for local and international organizations for more than 25 years.

== Family and education ==
The only child of Senevi B. Wickremasinghe and Shiranee Wickremasinghe (née Bandaratilaka) of Nawala, Koswatte, she attended Musaeus College, a private girls' school in Colombo. She graduated from King's College London with a BA (Hons) degree in English and went on to complete her MA degree in women's studies at the University of Colombo. She had gained her Ph.D. degree from the Institute of Education, University of London, specialising in feminist research methodology in Sri Lanka. In 1994, she married Ranil Wickremesinghe. In July 2022 she became the First Lady of Sri Lanka when Ranil became the President of Sri Lanka. She was the first presidential spouse with a Ph.D. in Sri Lanka.

== Academia ==
=== Selected publications ===
- From Theory to Action – Women, Gender and Development (2000), published by Friedrich Ebert Steiftung.
- ITDG (Practical Action) book Gender Dimensions in Disaster Management (2003/2005), co-authored (with Madhavi Malalgoda Ariyabandhu)
- Beyond Glass Ceilings and Brick Walls – Gender at the Workplace, co-authored with Wijaya Jayatilake and published by the International Labor Organization (2006).
- " Feminist Research Methodology – Making Meaning of Meaning Making (2010) published by Rutledge.
- " Towards Gender Equity / Equality: A Scan of gender Sensitive Laws, Policies and Programmes in Sri Lanka (2012) published by ILO.
