= Colombo East Electoral District =

Electoral district of Sri Lanka

Colombo East electoral district was an electoral district of Sri Lanka between July 1977 and February 1989. The district was named after the city of Colombo in Colombo District, Western Province. The district was created by the division of the Colombo South Electoral District into Colombo East and Colombo West electoral districts in July 1977. The 1978 Constitution of Sri Lanka introduced the proportional representation electoral system for electing members of Parliament. The existing 160 mainly single-member electoral districts were replaced with 22 multi-member electoral districts. Colombo East electoral district was replaced by the Colombo multi-member electoral district at the 1989 general elections, the first under the PR system, though Colombo East continues to be a polling division of the multi-member electoral district.

== Members of Parliament ==
Key

Independent UNP

Election	Member	Party	Term
1977	Edmund Samarawickrema	United National Party	1977-1989

== Elections ==
=== 1977 Parliamentary general election ===
Results of the 8th parliamentary election held on 21 July 1977 for the district:

Candidate	Party	Symbol	Votes	%
Edmund Samarawickrema	United National Party	Elephant	19,721	58.52
Vivian S. Kodikara	Sri Lanka Freedom Party	Hand	7,678	22.78
Bernard Soysa	Lanka Sama Samaja Party	Key	5,951	17.66
Gunasena Subasinghe		Umbrella	103	0.31
M.H. Jayaratne Peiris		Clock	57	0.17
M.P. Ariyadasa		Flower	56	0.17
Valid Votes			33,566	99.60
Rejected Votes			136	0.40
Total Polled			33,702	100.00
Registered Electors			43,574	
Turnout				77.34
