= Colombo South Electoral District =

Electoral district of Sri Lanka (1947–1977)

Colombo South electoral district was an electoral district of Sri Lanka between August 1947 and July 1977. The district was named after the city of Colombo in Colombo District, Western Province. The district was a two-member constituency between March 1960 and July 1977. The district was split into Colombo East and Colombo West electoral districts in July 1977.

== Members of Parliament ==
Key

Independent LSSP UNP

Election	Member	Party	Term
1947	R. A. de Mel	United National Party	1947-1952
1952	Theodore Frederick Jayewardene	United National Party	1952-1956
1956	Bernard Soysa	Lanka Sama Samaja Party	1956-1960

Election	Member 1	Party 1	Member 2	Party 2	Term
1960	Edmund Samarawickrema	United National Party	Bernard Soysa	Lanka Sama Samaja Party	1960–1977
1960	J. R. Jayewardene	United National Party	Bernard Soysa	Lanka Sama Samaja Party	1960–1977
1965	J. R. Jayewardene	United National Party	Bernard Soysa	Lanka Sama Samaja Party	1960–1977
1970	J. R. Jayewardene	United National Party	Bernard Soysa	Lanka Sama Samaja Party	1960–1977

== Elections ==
=== 1947 Parliamentary General Election ===
Results of the 1st parliamentary election held between 23 August 1947 and 20 September 1947 for the district:

Candidate	Party	Symbol	Votes	%
R. A. de Mel		Key	6,452	35.42
Paikiasothy Saravanamuttu		Flower	5,812	31.90
Bernard Soysa		Chair	3,774	20.72
M. G. Mendis		Hand	1,936	10.63
V.J. Soysa		Cup	95	0.52
Valid Votes			18,069	99.18
Rejected Votes			149	0.82
Total Polled			18,218	100.00
Registered Electors			31,864	
Turnout				57.17

=== 1952 Parliamentary General Election ===
Results of the 2nd parliamentary election held between 24 May 1952 and 30 May 1952 for the district:

Candidate	Party	Symbol	Votes	%
Theodore Frederick Jayewardene	United National Party	Elephant	10,918	58.76
Bernard Soysa	Lanka Sama Samaja Party	Key	5,738	30.88
W. A. D. Ramanayake		Hand	1,810	9.74
Valid Votes			18,466	99.39
Rejected Votes			114	0.61
Total Polled			18,580	100.00
Registered Electors			32,954	
Turnout				56.38

=== 1956 Parliamentary General Election ===
Results of the 3rd parliamentary election held between 5 April 1956 and 10 April 1956 for the district:

Candidate	Party	Symbol	Votes	%
Bernard Soysa	Lanka Sama Samaja Party	Key	14,199	59.05
Theodore Frederick Jayewardene	United National Party	Elephant	9,155	38.07
A.P. de Soysa	Sri Lanka Freedom Party	Hand	590	2.45
Valid Votes			23,944	99.58
Rejected Votes			102	0.42
Total Polled			24,046	100.00
Registered Electors			39,965	
Turnout				60.17

=== 1960 (March) Parliamentary General Election ===
Results of the 4th parliamentary election held on 19 March 1960 for the district:

Candidate	Party	Symbol	Votes	%
Edmund Samarawickrema	United National Party	Elephant	25,312	42.35%
Bernard Soysa	Lanka Sama Samaja Party	Key	16,206	27.11%
E. Hema Dabare	Sri Lanka Freedom Party	Hand	8,851	14.81%
Gamini Fernando	Mahajana Eksath Peramuna	Cart Wheel	5,412	9.05%
James Thevathason Ratnam		Ladder	1,273	2.13%
R. Bin Hassan		Sun	1,188	1.99%
M.L.S. Jayasekera		Umbrella	794	1.33%
Mahendra Rasaratnam		Cockerel	333	0.56%
S.R. Yapa		Eye	185	0.31%
Mahinda Weerapure		Lamp	178	0.30%
K.F.R. Fernando		Ship	42	0.07%
Valid Votes			59,774	100.00%
Rejected Votes			984	
Total Polled			60,758	
Registered Electors			42,367	
Turnout			143.41%	

=== 1960 (July) Parliamentary General Election ===
Results of the 5th parliamentary election held on 20 July 1960 for the district:

Candidate	Party	Symbol	Votes	%
Junius Richard Jayewardene	United National Party	Chair	25,814	42.19
Bernard Soysa	Lanka Sama Samaja Party	Key	23,914	38.94
Edmund Samarawickrema	United National Party	Elephant	5,765	9.39
George Jayasuriya		Butterfly	3,750	6.11
Vijaya Gunaratne		Cart Wheel	1,022	1.66
N. Alfred de Fonseka		Ladder	95	0.16
Valid Votes			60,360	98.28
Rejected Votes			1,056	0.18
Total Polled			61,416	100.00
Registered Electors			42,367	
Turnout				144.96

=== 1965 Parliamentary General Election ===
Results of the 6th parliamentary election held on 22 March 1965 for the district:

Candidate	Party	Symbol	Votes	%
Junius Richard Jayewardene	United National Party		Uncontested	
Bernard Soysa	Lanka Sama Samaja Party		Uncontested	
Valid Votes			N/A	
Rejected Votes			N/A	
Total Polled			N/A	
Registered Electors			57,403	
Turnout			N/A	

=== 1970 Parliamentary General Election ===
Results of the 7th parliamentary election held on 27 May 1970 for the district:

Candidate	Party	Symbol	Votes	%
Junius Richard Jayewardene	United National Party	Elephant	57,609	58.83
Bernard Soysa	Lanka Sama Samaja Party	Key	36,783	37.56
Ratnasabapathy Wijaya Indra		Eye	1,166	1.19
Ariyadasa Peiris		Bell	561	0.57
A.S. Jayamaha		Cockerel	241	0.25
Mudalige Justin Perera		Flower	165	0.17
Joseph Beling		Chair	164	0.17
Yathiendradasa Manampery		Pair of Scales	105	0.11
Valid Votes			96,794	98.84
Rejected Votes			1,134	1.16
Total Polled			97,928	100.00
Registered Electors			66,136	
Turnout				148.07
