= E. P. Wickremasinghe =

Sri Lankan naval officer

- Spouse: Violet Wickramasinghe
- Children: Shiranthi Rajapaksa
- Military career
- Allegiance: Sri Lankan
- Branch: Ceylon Naval Volunteer Force, Royal Ceylon Navy
- Rank: Commander
- Conflicts: World War II
- Awards: Burma Star

Commander E. P. Wickremasinghe was a Sri Lanka naval officer.

Born to a Roman Catholic family, he enlisted in the Ceylon Naval Volunteer Force (CNVF) as a Signalman/Gunner at the start of the World War II. In September 1943, Wickremasinghe was serving on board HMS Overdale Wyke as yeoman to the captain, when she intercepted and accepted the surrender of the Italian sloop Eritrea. He later served in the Burma campaign and was awarded the Burma Star, serving as yeoman to two Motor Fishing Vessels 185 and 186 to Akyab in Burma. He was a member of the CRVNF contingent to the London Victory Parade in June 1946. With the formation of the Royal Ceylon Navy in 1950, Wickremasinghe joined the regular naval force as a Leading signalmen and later gained an officer commission. As a Lieutenant Commander, he served as Commander Northern Area from 1965 to 1966 and as a Commander during the JVP Insurrection.

Wickremasinghe had been awarded the Royal Naval Volunteer Reserve Long Service and Good Conduct Medal, 1939–1945 Star, the Burma Star, the Defense Medal and the War Medal 1939–1945 for war service with the Ceylon Royal Naval Volunteer Reserve and for service in the Royal Ceylon Navy he received the Ceylon Armed Services Long Service Medal and the Ceylon Armed Services Inauguration Medal.

He married Violet Wickramasinghe, their daughter Shiranthi Rajapaksa married Mahinda Rajapaksa who became the President of Sri Lanka.
