= R. S. F. de Mel =

Sri Lankan politician

R. F. S. de Mel was a Ceylonese politician. The son of Sir Henry De Mel and Lady Elsie De Mel (nee Jayawickrema), he was elected to the Colombo Municipal Council and served as the Mayor of Colombo in 1945 and from 1947 to 1949. He was elected a member of the Senate of Ceylon in 1947. His brother was the Right Reverend Lakdasa De Mel, the first Bishop of Kurunegala and his cousin R. A. de Mel was also a Mayor of Colombo.
