= Hema Premadasa =

Sri Lankan politician (born 1934)

- Hema Premadasa in 1992

3rd First Lady of Sri Lanka
- In role 2 January 1989 – 1 May 1993
- Preceded by: Elina Jayewardene
- Succeeded by: Wimalawathi Kumarihami

Personal details
- Born: Hema Wickramatunge; 27 October 1934 (age 92) Bandarawela, British Ceylon
- Spouse: Ranasinghe Premadasa (m. 1964; died 1993)
- Children: Sajith, Dulanjali
- Occupation: politician

Hema Premadasa (née Wickramatunge; born 27 October 1934) is a Sri Lankan public figure, politician and the widow of Ranasinghe Premadasa, the third President of Sri Lanka. She served as First Lady of Sri Lanka from 1989 until her husband's assassination in 1993.

Born as Hema Wickramatunge in 1934, as the only daughter of Wickramatunge Arachchige Charles Appuhamy of Bandarawela, she went on to marry Ranasinghe Premadasa, a Sri Lankan politician of the United National Party (UNP), on 23 June 1964. The couple had two children and were married for almost 29 years.

== First Lady (1989–1993) ==
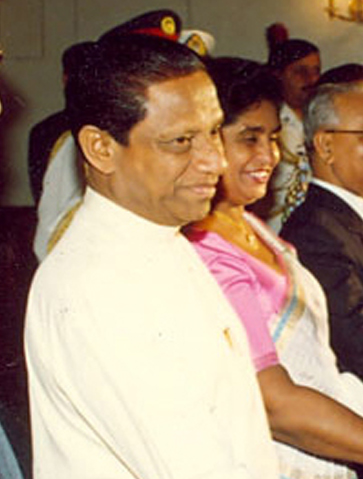
President Ranasinghe Premadasa and First Lady Hema Premadasa, 1992

As first lady, she visited accident sites and hospitals when Sri Lankans were injured. Although Premadasa was married to a politician, she attempted to form a unique identity for herself in the Sri Lankan political landscape. She was a member and also president of the Seva Vanitha Movement (SVM). She was involved in social welfare and charitable initiatives, including programmes supporting disadvantaged communities, low-income families, women and children. In 1991, even though the Sri Lankan government attempted to ban the Mothers' Front rally, Premadasa held her own rally on the same day.

Premadasa was also involved in initiatives to improve access to eye care in Sri Lanka. According to ophthalmologist Sunita Agarwal’s biographical account, Premadasa requested a free eye-care camp during the 1992 Gam Udawa programme in Moneragala. The camp provided eye examinations and medical treatment, which included surgery for further treatment."Dr Agarwal's account" (PDF).

== Assassination of Ranasinghe Premadasa (1993) ==
Her husband, Ranasinghe Premadasa was killed along with 23 others on 1 May 1993, around 12:45pm during the UNP's May Day rally in Colombo by an LTTE suicide bomber. The explosion took place at Armour Street-Grandpass Junction in Hulftsdorp, Colombo while Premadasa was unofficially supervising the procession as it was heading towards the Galle Face Green from Sugathadasa Stadium. The suicide bomber was later identified as Kulaveerasingam Veerakumar alias 'Babu', a close friend of the president's valet, E. M. P. Mohideen. He rode a bicycle towards the president, left it near the president's Range Rover and walked towards the president when security personnel attempted to stop him. Despite this, Mohideen allowed him to get close to the president, when Veerakumar detonated the explosive device. Killed in the explosion were Mohideen, SSP Ronnie Gunasinghe and most of Premadasa's personal staff. Another 38 people were injured in the bombing including seven who were seriously wounded. Confusion prevailed as it was unclear what had happened, with Premadasa and his security detail missing. His death was only confirmed two hours later by his personal physician when the remains of the president were identified by his ring and watch.

=== Immediate aftermath ===
The site of the explosion was cleaned within hours before a proper investigation was conducted. The May Day parade continued even after the explosion for some time as it was unclear what had happened. An island-wide curfew was imposed hours after the assassination. Twenty three people, including eighteen Tamils and two Sinhalese members of the president's domestic staff, were taken into custody in connection with the assassination. Security sources said those arrested included a sergeant from the police Special Task Force and a sergeant from the now disbanded Presidential Security Division, both of whom Veerakumar had entertained with liquor.

Prime Minister Dingiri Banda Wijetunga became acting president, and was officially elected and sworn in as the new president of Sri Lanka on 7 May 1993. The government did not announce the death of President Premadasa until 6 PM local time when state-owned television network Rupavahini broadcast a tape of the BBC's report of the incident. A period of national mourning was announced until the funeral, which took place on 9 May 1993 at Independence Square in Colombo.

Following her husband’s assassination in May 1993, Hema Premadasa addressed mourners at his funeral, expressing regret that he had been unable to complete his programme of national development. She pledged to continue his efforts to promote peace and social progress, and appealed for public support in carrying forward his work.

== Later years ==
Later, she made her own attempts to run for presidency in 1994. She was forced to call off her campaign after opposition parties ran a "scurrilous poster campaign".

Premadasa expressed her support for Champika Ranawaka’s campaign in the Colombo district for the 2015 Sri Lankan parliamentary election.

In 2017, Premadasa promoted children’s artistic and creative developments. The Sri Lanka Urban Settlement Development Authority’s annual report (2017) records children’s arts festival’s held under her patronage, featuring competitions in painting, drama and essay writing. The programme recognised the achievements of children from urban communities, including disadvantaged backgrounds, with Premadasa presenting awards to the winners."Annual report 2017" (PDF).

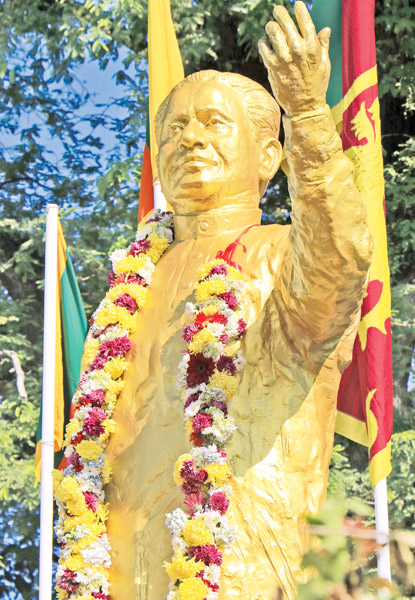
The Sri Lankabhimanya Ranasinghe Premadasa Memorial in Colombo, Sri Lanka

In 2018, Hema Premadasa attended a ceremony marking the 25th anniversary of the assassination of her husband, former president Ranasinghe Premadasa. The commemoration was held near his statue in Hulftsdorp, Colombo, and was attended by the then President Maithripala Sirisena and then Prime Minister Ranil Wickremesinghe.

On 3 April 2023, she returned the official residence allocated to her as the widow of a former president to the government. According to her son, she had not used the official residence and had continued to live in her private home. The matter had attracted public and political criticism over the provision of state funded residences to former presidents and their widows.

In May 2026, Premadasa attended a ceremony in Aluthkade, Colombo, marking the 33rd anniversary of the assassination of her husband. The commemoration was held near his statue and was attended by her son, Opposition Leader Sajith Premadasa, other family members and several political figures. Floral tributes were laid at the statue in his memory.

== Personal life ==
Premadasa is the mother of Sajith, current leader of the opposition and leader of the Samagi Jana Balawegaya. Premadasa is a fan and player of netball.

Honorary titles
Preceded by Elina Jayewardene	First Lady of Sri Lanka; 2 January 1989 – 1 May 1993	Succeeded by Wimalawathi Kumarihami
