= J. R. Jayewardene Centre =

Library and museum for 1st President of Sri Lanka in Colombo, Sri Lanka

- Interactive map of the J. R. Jayewardene Centre area

General information
- Location: 191 Dharmapala Mawatha, Colombo
- Coordinates: 6.9161589042250045°N 79.86184815486314°E
- Named for: J. R. Jayewardene
- Inaugurated: 1988
- Operator: Board of Governors

Website
- jrjc.lk

J. R. Jayewardene Centre is an archive, library, and museum in Colombo, Sri Lanka. It is the official institute of the first executive President of Sri Lanka, Junius Richard Jayewardene. The centre is based on the United States model of Presidential libraries.

The centre was created under a separate act of Parliament, the J. R. Jayewardene Centre Act No. 77 of 1988, to preserve and administer the records of the former president. It archives Jayewardene's personal library and papers, as well as papers and records from the Presidential Secretariat and gifts he received during his tenure. The centre is based at Vaijantha, Jayewardene's childhood home, which now serves as the J. R. Jayewardene Memorial Centre. The centre also has ownership of Braemar, Jayewardene's family home.

The centre is made up of a library, museum, presidential archives and a Japanese museum. It is open to the public and for hosting events, and is under the control of the Presidential Secretariat.

The centre exhibits collections of items that Jayawardene used.

== Board of Governors ==
- Anura Kumara Dissanayake (President of Sri Lanka)
- Jagath Wickramaratne (Speaker of Parliament)
- Chandrika Kumaratunga (former President of Sri Lanka)
- Mahinda Rajapaksha (former President of Sri Lanka)
- Maithripala Sirisena (former President of Sri Lanka)
- Gotabaya Rajapaksa (former President of Sri Lanka)
- Ranil Wickremesinghe (former President of Sri Lanka)

== See also ==
- Vaijantha
- Braemar
- Bandaranaike Memorial International Conference Hall
