= Arcadia, Diyatalawa =

Country house in Diyatalawa, Sri Lanka

Arcadia
- Former names: Arcadia
- Alternative names: Arcadia Estate

General information
- Architectural style: Tudor
- Location: Diyatalawa, Sri Lanka

Arcadia is a country house in Diyatalawa, in the Badulla District, Sri Lanka. It is known for being the country house of the press baron D.R. Wijewardene.

Built by British planter, G. M. Crabbe, the house and tea estate which was also called Arcadia was sold to D. R. Wijewardene in 1932 following the 1930 - 1932 economic crisis triggered by a steep drop in tea prices. Wijewardene expanded the house and added a landscaped garden. Wijewardene used Arcadia as a holiday retreat and to host distinguished guests during weekends, notably Lord Soulbury, Sir Fredrick Rees and Fredrick Burns who were members of the Soulbury Commission. On recommendations of the Soulbury Commission, Sri Lanka gained dominion status and independence in 1948. The house which remained in the Wijewardene family was used by family members such as Ray Wijewardene.

== See also ==
- Adisham Hall
