= Seelawathie Gopallawa =

Former First Lady of Sri Lanka

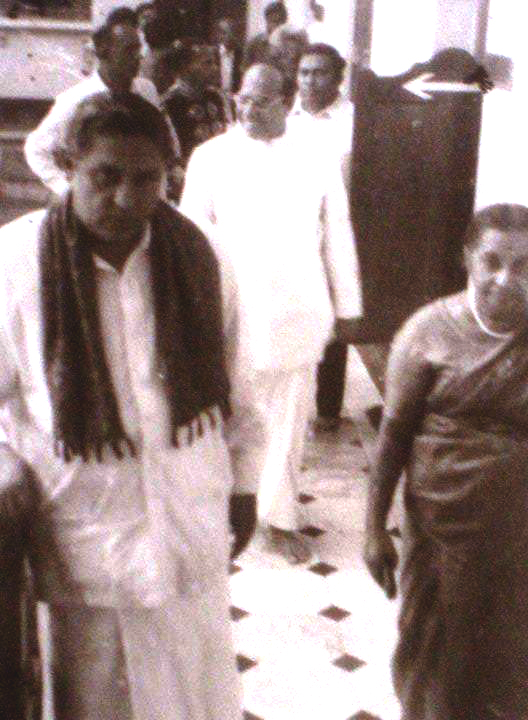
- Seelawathie Gopallawa (right)

1st First Lady of Sri Lanka
- In office May 22, 1972 – 4 October 1977
- President: William Gopallawa
- Preceded by: Position created
- Succeeded by: Elina Jayewardene

Personal details
- Born: Seelawathie Rambukwella
- Died: October 4, 1977
- Resting place: Dullewa
- Spouse: William Gopallawa (1928–1977; her death)
- Children: 5

Seelawathie Rambukwella Gopallawa (died October 4, 1977) was a Sri Lankan public figure who served as the First Lady of Sri Lanka from 1972 until her death in 1977, as the wife of President William Gopallawa.

== Biography ==
Gopallawa was born Seelawathie Rambukwella to L. B. Rambukwelle. She married William Gopallawa, a lawyer and then-member of the Matale Urban Council, on March 8, 1928. The couple had four children: two daughters, Iranganie and Chintha, and two sons, Asoka and Monty. Her youngest son, Monty Gopallawa, served as Minister of Cultural Affairs from 2000 to 2001 and Governor of Central Province from 2002 until 2005.

Gopallawa's husband, William Gopallawa, served as the Governor-General of Ceylon from 1962 to 1972. In 1972, Seelawathie Gopallawa became the first First Lady of Sri Lanka when Sri Lanka became a republic and her husband assumed the presidency.

Gopallawa served as the country's inaugural first lady until her death on October 4, 1977. Her ashes were buried in the Gopallawa family cemetery in Dullewa following her cremation. Like her husband, who died in 1981, Seelawathie Gopallawa donated her eyes to the Sri Lanka Eye Donation Society following her death.

She had lived as the family home in Dharmapala Mawatha, Matale.
