= Pradeep Jayewardene House =

- Location within Sri Lanka
- Alternative names: Red Cliffs Mirissa

General information
- Status: private
- Type: residence
- Architectural style: Tropical Modernism
- Location: Mirissa, Sri Lanka
- Coordinates: 5.955867°N 80.452187°E
- Current tenants: Paradise Island Leisure
- Renovated: 1997-1998
- Client: Pradeep Jayewardene

Renovating team
- Architect: Geoffrey Bawa

Other information
- Number of rooms: 4 bedroom

Website
- Red Cliffs Mirissa

Pradeep Jayewardene House is the country house of the Jayewardene family. It is a pavilion-style villa which can be booked as holiday accommodation.

The original colonial bungalow was built in the northern outskirts of Mirissa, on a steep cliff that forms the eastern coast of Weligama Bay. It was used by J. R. Jayewardene and his family on their holidays. It was burnt down in 1987 during the early days of the JVP Insurrection, following the signing of the Indo-Sri Lanka Accord.

In 1997 Jayewardene's grandson, Pradeep, commissioned architect and family friend, Geoffrey Bawa, to rebuild the family holiday home. The main residence, a rectangular structure 34 m (112 ft) long and 12 m (39 ft) wide, is located on the crest of the hill which rises above the bay
