= Vaijantha =

General information
- Location: Colombo, Sri Lanka
- Owner: J. R. Jayewardene Centre

Vaijantha, was the childhood home of J. R. Jayewardene former President of Sri Lanka in Colombo, Sri Lanka. Today it houses the J.R. Jayewardene Centre.

It was built by Jayewardene's father Hon. Justice Eugene Wilfred Jayewardene KC, a Chief Justice of Ceylon. J. R. Jayewardene and his wife Elina moved into their own house Braemar in 1938. In 1988, the J.R Jayewardene Memorial Centre was established by the J.R Jayewardene Centre Act No. 77 of 1988 by Parliament at Vaijantha. It serves as the archive for J.R Jayewardene's personal library and papers as well as papers, records from the Presidential Secretariat and gifts he received in his tenure as president.

== See also ==
- Braemar, Colombo
- President's House, Colombo
- Presidential library
