= Thomas Lister Villiers =

Sir Thomas Lister Villiers (31 October 1869 – 21 December 1959) was a British planter in Ceylon. He was appointed the European unofficial member of the Legislative Council of Ceylon from 1924 to 1931, appointed member of the State Council of Ceylon (1932) and chairman of George Steuart Group.

Born in Adisham to Rev. Henry Montagu Villiers, of the Villiers family, who was Prebendary of St Paul's Cathedral, daughter of Lord John Russell former British Prime Minister. He was educated at the Sherborne School and left to Ceylon to start a career as a planter apprenticing at the Elbedde Estate in Bogawantalawa. He left Ceylon and spend four years in Brazil, returning to Ceylon in 1900, he purchased a tea estate, the Dickoya Group. He joined the George Steuart Company in 1905 and in 1928 he became the Chairman of the George Steuart Company, a post he held until his retirement in 1949. In 1929 he began construction of Adisham Hall, his country house in Bandarawela which was completed in 1931. He left Ceylon after his retirement and died in Kent on 21 December 1959.

He married Evelyn Hope Walker in 1896, they had two sons, Henry Lister (b. 1897) and Thomas Hyde (b. 1902). Henry Lister served as a lieutenant in the British Army and was killed in action during World War I in 1917. Thomas Hyde served in the Royal Navy as a Lieutenant Commander in World War II and died in 1955. After the death of his first wife, he married Marjorie Glencora Keyt in 1953.
