= R. A. de Mel =

Ceylonese politician

Hon. Reginald Abraham de Mel

Deputy Speaker of the Parliament
- In office 14 October 1947 – 23 August 1948
- Prime Minister: D. S. Senanayake
- Preceded by: position created
- Succeeded by: H. W. Amarasuriya

Member of the Ceylon Parliament for Colombo South
- In office 20 September 1947 – August 1948
- Preceded by: seat created
- Succeeded by: T. F. Jayewardene

Personal details
- Born: 8 November 1894
- Died: 1961
- Party: United National Party
- Spouse: Evelyn née Fernando
- Children: Laleeni, Irangani
- Education: Richmond College, Galle
- Profession: Proctor

Reginald Abraham de Mel (8 November 1894 – 1961) was a Ceylonese politician. Having served as the Mayor of Colombo, he served as the Deputy Speaker and Chairman of Committees in the first parliament of Ceylon, until he was unseated by an election petition.

== Early life and education ==
De Mel received his education at Richmond College in Galle, where he represented the college cricket team. He qualified as a proctor.

== Political career ==
Having been elected to the Colombo Municipal Council, he served as the Mayor of Colombo from 1944 to 1946.

De Mel was elected to parliament at the 1st parliamentary election, representing the United National Party (UNP), in the Colombo South electorate. He secured 6,452 votes (35.4% of the total vote), 640 votes ahead of Paikiasothy Saravanamuttu, an independent candidate, who received 32% of the total vote. He was subsequently appointed the Deputy Speaker and Chairman of Committees in the first parliament of Ceylon. De Mel subsequently lost his seat in August 1948 after being found guilty of corrupt practices by aiding, abetting, counselling and procuring the offences of impersonation in an election petition filled by Saravanamuttu. Saravanamuttu contested the ensuing by-election held in Colombo South in November 1948 but again lost, this time to T. F. Jayewardene. The Duplication Road in Colombo was renamed R.A. De Mel Mawatha in his memory.

== Family ==
He married Evelyn Fernando, daughter of Hettikandage Bastian Fernando. They had two children Laleeni and Irangani. C. H. Z. Fernando was his brother-in-law. He was a cousin of R. S. F. de Mel, former mayor of Colombo.
