= Adisham Hall =

Country house near Haputale, Sri Lanka

Coordinates: 6.772°N 80.931°E

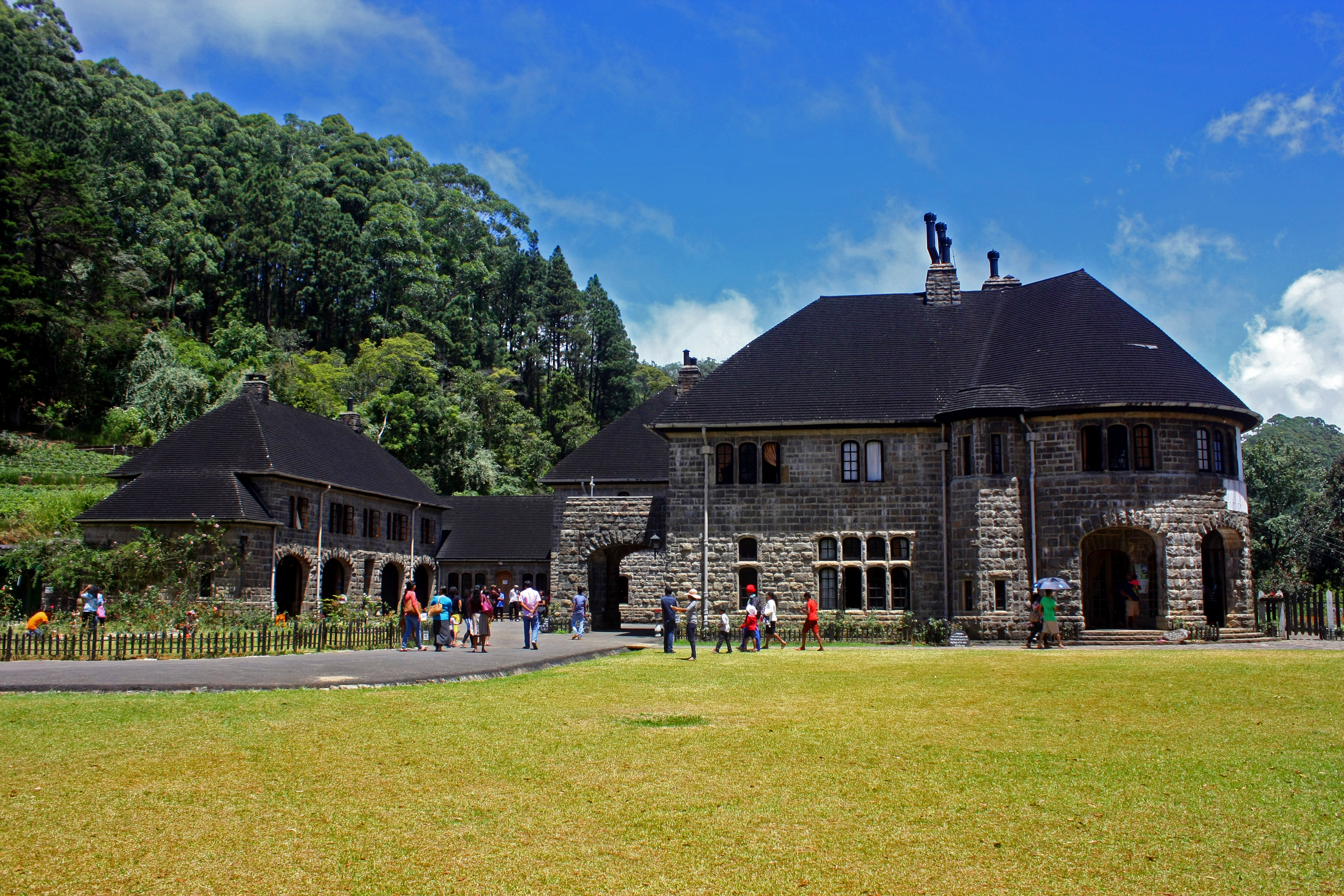
- Interactive map of the Adisham Hall area
- Former names: Adisham Hall
- Alternative names: St Benedict's Monastery

General information
- Architectural style: Tudor and Jacabian
- Location: Haputale, Sri Lanka, St. Benedict's Monastery, Adisham, Haputhale, Sri Lanka, Haputale, Sri Lanka
- Elevation: 5,000 ft (1,500 m)
- Current tenants: St. Benedict's Monastery
- Construction started: 1927
- Completed: 1931
- Client: Sir Thomas Villiers
- Owner: Catholic Church in Sri Lanka
- Landlord: Sylvestro Benedictine Congregation of Sri Lanka

Design and construction
- Architects: R. Booth and F. Webster

Website
- adisham.org

Adisham Hall, or Adisham Bungalow is a country house near Haputale, in the Badulla District, Sri Lanka. At present, it houses the Adisham monastery of Saint Benedict. It has a relic (a chip of a bone) of St. Sylvester at the chapel.

Sir Thomas Villiers was awarded 2.8 ha (7 acres) from the Tangamale Strict Nature Reserve by an act of the British parliament. The house was built in 1931 by an English aristocrat and planter Sir Thomas Villiers, former chairman of George Steuart Co, a trading and estate agency based in Colombo. Sir Thomas was a grandson of Lord John Russell and descendant of the Dukes of Bedford. Named after Adisham, it was designed by R. Booth and F. Webster in Tudor and Jacobean style. Adisham Hall played host to many prominent personalities of the colony until the retirement of Sir Thomas, after which it was purchased by Don Charles Wijewardene and his daughter Rukmini Wijewardene, owners of Sedawatte Estates, in 1950. While studying at LSE, London, Rukmini Wijewardene, in order to thank him for the sale, made a courtesy call on Sir Thomas Villiers who was, by then, living in Knightsbridge, London. Don Charles and Rukmini were the husband and daughter of Vimala Wijewardene. In 1961 Rukmini Beligammana (née Wijewardene) sold it to an Italian Benedictan monk. Upon purchasing the house and property the Italian monk removed silver cutlery and a few items of furniture in order to recover his investment and also make a profit. After leaving it unoccupied for two years he subsequently donated the house and property to the Ampitiya Benedictine Monastery in 1963. The house is well preserved along with its period fittings and furniture, and is open to visitors.

== See also ==
- Arcadia, Diyatalawa
- Assassination of S. W. R. D. Bandaranaike
