= Jacob De Mel =

Sri Lankan philanthropist and entrepreneur

Lakshapathiya Mahavidanalage Jacob De Mel
- Born: 19 August 1839; Moratuwa
- Died: 1 April 1919 (aged 79)
- Education: S. Thomas' College, Mount Lavinia; Royal College, Colombo
- Occupations: business personality, entrepreneur
- Known for: Philanthropy, Entrepreneurship
- Spouse: (Dona) Helena Ferdinando (m. 1869-1906)
- Children: 14 (9 daughters & 5 sons including Henry De Mel)
- Relatives: James Peiris (son-in-law)

Lakshapathiya Mahavidanalage Jacob De Mel (1839–1919), also simply known as V. Jacob De Mel, was a pioneering Ceylonese mining magnate and philanthropist who is still regarded as one of the finest entrepreneurs to have emerged in Sri Lanka. His 100th death anniversary was remembered in Sri Lanka on 1 April 2019, coinciding with April Fools' Day.

== Personal life ==
Jacob De Mel was born on 19 August 1839 in Moratuwa when British ruled Sri Lanka (British Ceylon). He was born the fifth son in his family to Francisco De Mel and Telge Leonara Peiris. It is believed that his family could trace their lineage back to 1534 and were noted to have held position in the court of King Parakramabahu VI. The family had converted to Christianity in 1637, in the presence of Diogo de Melo de Castro. Jacob pursued his primary and secondary education at Royal College, Colombo and S. Thomas' College, Mutwal.

Jacob de Mel married Dona Helena Ferdinando, a niece of Mudaliyer Jeronis de Soysa on 10 November 1869 and the couple had 14 children including 9 daughters and 5 sons. One of his daughters, Grace De Mel was married to James Peiris, a veteran politician who was involved in the Sri Lankan independence movement. He died on 1 April 1919 at the age of 79.

== Career ==
Jacob followed his father's example in entrepreneurship combined with charity. It was an era where both entrepreneurship and charity went hand in hand. He began his early career by foreseeing the potential of the plumbago industry and subsequently became the industry magnate after acquiring the Ragedra mine in the district of Kurunegala. Around 1880s, he owned one of the largest commercial houses in the nation employing a labour force of approximately 3000 employees in his mines. He also carried his interests in agriculture and started planting coconut, cinnamon and tea.

In 1880, he established H. L. De Mel & Company (Private) Limited in order to manage his plantations and other operations. The company was named after his eldest son, Sir Henry Lawson De Mel. After his retirement, Henry De Mel continued the management of the company. During his tenure, he implemented a concept on 'business model' which is still being followed at the Colombo University.
