= Hector Alfred Jayewardene =

Sri Lankan lawyer and politician

Hector Alfred Wijesinghe Jayewardene (22 July 1870 – 16 October 1913) was a Ceylonese (Sri Lankan) politician and a prominent lawyer. He was active in the political movement in Ceylon. He was an elected member of the Colombo Municipal Council for twenty years.

Born to James Alfred Jayewardene, a Proctor who was the Deputy Coroner of Colombo. His younger brothers included Colonel Theodore Godfrey Wijesinghe Jayewardene was a member of the State Council for Balangoda electorate, John Adrian St. Valentine Jayewardene and Eugene Wilfred Jayewardene who became judges of the Supreme Court.

Wilfred Jayewardene was educated at St. Benedict's College, Wesley College and at the Royal College, Colombo and became a Proctor in 1893. In 1895 he was elected to the Colombo Municipal Council from the New Bazaar ward and held the post till his death. He was instrumental in Sir Ponnambalam Ramanathan winning the election for the seat of educated Ceylonese in the Legislative Council of Ceylon, the first political election in the island.

J R Jayewardene, his nephew, became the first executive President of Sri Lanka.

== See also ==
- List of political families in Sri Lanka
