= Anura Bastian =

Sri Lankan politician

Hon. Anura Bastian

Deputy Minister of Defence
- In office 1983–1989
- President: J. R. Jayewardene

Member of Parliament for Colombo West District
- In office 5 February 1978 – 8 March 1989

Personal details
- Born: 30 July 1950 (age 75)
- Party: United National Party

Anura Bastian (born 30 July 1950) is a Sri Lankan politician. He was a former Deputy Minister of Defence and Member of Parliament (1978 - 1989). A favorite of J. R. Jayewardene, he succeeded his parliamentary seat when the latter became President of Sri Lanka. In 1983, he was appointed Deputy Minister of Defence.
