= Ayoma Rajapaksa =

Former First lady of Sri Lanka

8th First Lady of Sri Lanka
- In role 18 November 2019 – 14 July 2022
- Preceded by: Jayanthi Pushpa Kumari
- Succeeded by: Maithree Wickremesinghe

Personal details
- Born: 24 November 1957 (age 68) Dominion of Ceylon
- Spouse: Gotabaya Rajapaksa (m.1980)
- Children: 1

Ayoma Rajapaksa (born 24 November 1957) is a Sri Lankan public figure who served as the First Lady of Sri Lanka from 2019 until her husband's resignation in 2022, as the wife of President Gotabaya Rajapaksa.

== Later life ==
On 9 July 2022, the Rajapaksa family fled their official residence in Colombo prior to protesters breaking through police barricades and entering the premises. Protesters were seen occupying the mansion, even swimming in the president's pool. Later that evening the Speaker of the Parliament confirmed that the president would resign his office on 13 July 2022. On 11 July, the Prime Minister's Office also reconfirmed it. On 9 and 10 July, the Rajapaksa's whereabouts were unknown to the public until Sri Lankan military sources told the BBC on 11 July that the President was on a Navy vessel in Sri Lankan waters. Later that day, the Speaker of the Parliament announced that the President was still in the country. It was later revealed that the Rajapaksa family were evacuated from the President's House on the morning of 9 July by the Sri Lanka Navy and had boarded SLNS Gajabahu which then departed Colombo harbour and sailed within Sri Lankan territorial waters allowing them to maintain communications while being safely out of reach of the protesters.

In September 2022, Rajapaksa reported receiving repeated telephone calls from an individual demanding money and threatening her. After approximately 30 calls over 3 days, a complaint was made to the criminal investigation department (CID), which arrested a barber who was connected to the Kolonnwa area with the incident.

On 2 September 2022, the Rajapaksa family returned to Sri Lanka, ending their 52-day self-imposed exile. On their return, Gotabaya was provided with a new official residence and security granted to a former president.

== Personal life ==
Ayoma Rajapaksa is married to Gotabaya Rajapaksa and has one son. Gotabaya Rajapaksa had dual Sri Lankan and US citizenship but had to renounce his US citizenship prior to running for president in 2019. Ayoma and her son retain their US citizenship.
