= Braemar, Colombo =

Braemar

General information
- Location: Colombo, Sri Lanka
- Completed: 1938
- Owner: J. R. Jayewardene Centre

Braemar was the principal adulthood home of J. R. Jayewardene, former president of Sri Lanka. Jayewardene and his wife Elina built it in 1938 located Ward Place, Colombo.

The original house built by Gilbert Leonard Rupasinghe, a notary public and a successful businessmen, named it Braemar after Braemar in Aberdeenshire, Scotland. Rupasinghe was the father of Jayewardene's wife Elina Bandara Rupasinghe. When the Jayewardene and Elina married in 1935, they moved into Jayewardene's parents house, Vaijantha. In 1938, the couple demolished old Braemar and in its grounds they built their new house which retained the name Braemar. Moving into it soon after, it was their home until the deaths of J. R. Jayewardene and Elina. Even during his tenure as prime minister and president, Jayewardenes remained at Braemar using President's House, Colombo only for official functions.

The house and its land was gifted to the Inland Revenue Department by President Jayewardene in lieu of tax with the request for the house to be used by the Institute of Fundamental Studies. In 1985, Jayewardene amended the deed of gift stating it should be given to the Department of Archaeology with the objective of creating a museum and called for and exhibit on the Rupasinghe family. The deed was amended in 1993, including the Inland Revenue Department and adding the final recipient as the J. R. Jayewardene Centre. J. R. Jayewardene and Elina Jayewardene retained life interest until their deaths. The property is currently owned by the J. R. Jayewardene Centre.

== See also ==
- Vaijantha
- J. R. Jayewardene Centre
