= Henry De Mel =

Ceylonese industrialist, lawyer, philanthropist and politician

Sir Henry de Mel CBE

Former member of the Legislative Council
- In office 1921–1936

Personal details
- Born: 21 January 1877
- Died: 8 May 1936 (aged 59)
- Spouse: Lady Elsie Jayawickrema
- Relations: Jacob De Mel (father); Dona Helena Ferdinando
- Children: Lakdasa De Mel, R. S. F. de Mel, Irene, Helena
- Education: S. Thomas' College; Royal College, Colombo
- Occupation: Industrialist
- Profession: Proctor
- Awards: Knight Bachelor, Knight of the Order of the Crown, Commander of the Order of the British Empire

Sir Henry Lawson De Mel, CBE (21 January 1877 – 8 May 1936) was a Ceylonese industrialist, lawyer, philanthropist and politician. He was a member of the Legislative Council and founder of the H.L. De Mel & Co.

== Early life and education ==
Henry De Mel was born 21 January 1877, the son of Jacob De Mel (1839-1919) and Dona Helena née Ferdinando (1850-1906), a cousin of Sir Charles Henry de Soysa. He was one of fourteen children and was educated at S. Thomas' College and Royal College, Colombo.

== Legal and business career ==
In 1898, he started his legal career with the law firm Peiris & De Mel and was appointed a Proctor of the Supreme Court of Ceylon in 1904. He married Elsie Jayawickrame, the daughter of Mudaliyar S. H. Jayawickrame of Kurunegala. He later gave up his legal career to concentrate on his plantation and mining interests and was also an avid motorist. De Mel was the producer and exporter of the world's highest quality graphite and supplied Dixon Ticonderoga Company. In 1921, he built the De Mel Building on Chatham Street, Colombo Fort.

== Political career ==
In 1921 he was elected unopposed to the Legislative Council of Ceylon on behalf of the Low Country Products Association and at the same election his brother-in-law, Sir James Peiris, was also elected. In 1931 he was knighted for his services to the government of Ceylon.

== Family ==
His sons were the Right Reverend Lakdasa De Mel (1902-1976), the first Bishop of Kurunegala and R. S. F. de Mel, a former Mayor of Colombo. One daughter, Irene, married Dr. Percival Cholmondeley Chalmers de Silva (1904-1987), a renowned pediatrician. Another daughter, Helena, was married to Watson Pieris, son of Hannadige Joseph Pieris of Oliver Castle, Gregory's Road who was a cousin of Jeronis Pieris.

== Death ==
On 8 May 1936 Sir Henry De Mel died of injuries sustained after being shot while trying to resolve a dispute between two workers on one of his vast coconut plantations.

== Honors ==
He was the first Ceylonese to be appointed a Commander of the Order of the British Empire (CBE) in the 1918 New Year Honours for services to the Government of Ceylon. He was knighted as a Knight Bachelor in the 1931 Birthday Honours for public and philanthropic services. He had been appointed a Chevalier in the Belgian Order of the Crown.
