= Colombo West Electoral District =

Electoral district in Sri Lanka

Colombo West electoral district was an electoral district of Sri Lanka between July 1977 and February 1989. The district was named after the city of Colombo in Colombo District, Western Province. The district was created by the division of the Colombo South Electoral District into Colombo East and Colombo West electoral districts in July 1977. The 1978 Constitution of Sri Lanka introduced the proportional representation electoral system for electing members of Parliament. The existing 160 mainly single-member electoral districts were replaced with 22 multi-member electoral districts. Colombo West electoral district was replaced by the Colombo multi-member electoral district at the 1989 general elections, the first under the PR system, though Colombo West continues to be a polling division of the multi-member electoral district.

== Members of Parliament ==
Key

Independent UNP

Election	Member	Party	Term
1977	J. R. Jayewardene	UNP	1977-1978
1978 (by-election)	Anura Bastian	UNP	1978-1989

== Elections ==
=== 1977 parliamentary general election ===
Results of the 8th parliamentary election held on 21 July 1977 for the district:

Candidate	Party	Symbol	Votes	%
Junius Richard Jayewardene	United National Party	Elephant	21,707	78.91
M. Chandralal Salgado	Sri Lanka Freedom Party	Hand	3,769	13.65
S.D. Wijesinghe		Key	1,803	6.55
H. Navaratne Banda		Chair	70	0.26
K.A. Thabrew		Butterfly	53	0.19
Valid Votes			27,402	99.61
Rejected Votes			107	0.39
Total Polled			27,509	100.00
Registered Electors			37,983	
Turnout				72.42

=== 1978 parliamentary by election ===
Results of the parliamentary by-election held on 21 March 1978 for the district:

Candidate	Party	Symbol	Votes	%
Anura Bastian	United National Party	Elephant	13,156	59.31
D. W. Abeyakoon	Sri Lanka Freedom Party	Hand	3,024	13.63
Bernard Soysa	Lanka Sama Samaja Party	Key	3,019	13.61
Navindra Gooneratna		Chair	2,497	11.26
R. Wijaya Indra		Eye	334	1.51
S. A. Karunanayaka		Bell	71	0.32
N. P. Perera		Lamp	30	0.14
G. K. S. Wijeyawardene		Umbrella	26	0.12
Valid Votes			22,110	99.68
Rejected Votes			71	0.32
Total Polled			22,181	100.00
Registered Electors			37,983	
Turnout				58.40
