= John Adrian St. Valentine Jayewardene =

Ceylonese lawyer and judge (1877–1927)

Puisne Justice of the Supreme Court of Ceylon

Personal details
- Born: John Adrian St. Valentine Wijesinghe Jayewardene; 1877
- Died: 1927 (aged 49–50)
- Spouse: Ethel Charlotte Irene Dissanayake
- Children: 1 (Clodagh Jayasuriya)
- Education: Royal College Colombo
- Occupation: Jurist, lawyer

John Adrian St. Valentine Wijesinghe Jayewardene (1877–1927) was a Ceylonese (Sri Lankan) lawyer who became a judge of the Supreme Court of Ceylon.

== Early life and education ==
A son of James Alfred Jayewardene (a Proctor who was the Deputy Coroner of Colombo), John's brothers included Hector Alfred Jayewardene (an advocate and member of the Colombo Municipal Council), Colonel Theodore Godfrey Wijesinghe Jayewardene (a Member of the State Council for Balangoda electorate), and Eugene Wilfred Jayewardene, who also became a Judge of the Supreme Court.

Jayewardene was educated at the Royal College, Colombo, and called to the bar at the Inner Temple, becoming a barrister.

== Career ==
In 1901, he returned to Ceylon and began his practice as an advocate. In 1904, he published the Law of Partition in Ceylon, which he revised and published again 20 years later.

In 1915, he was part of the legal defence team for Henry Pedris, which tried unsuccessfully to prevent his execution.

From 1922 to 1924 he served as the district judge of Colombo and in 1923 was appointed acting puisne justice thereafter confirmed as Judge of the Supreme Court of Ceylon.

== Personal life ==
In 1906, he married Ethel Charlotte Irene, daughter of Mudaliyar Francis William Tillekeratne Dissanayake. Their only child, daughter, Clodagh Jayasuriya, was elected to parliament. A nephew, Junius Richard Jayewardene, became the first executive President of Sri Lanka.

His home on Ward Place in Colombo, was known as Chateau Jubilee.

== See also ==
- List of political families in Sri Lanka
