= T. G. Jayewardene =

Sri Lankan politician

Colonel T. G. Jayewardene

Member of the State Council
- In office 1933–1936

Personal details
- Spouse: Lena Attygalle
- Relations: James Alfred (father), Hector Alfred (brother), Eugene Wilfred (brother), John Adrian (brother), Junius Richard (nephew)
- Children: Theodore Frederick (son)
- Education: Royal College, Colombo
- Profession: Engineer
- Awards: Volunteer Officers' Decoration

Military service
- Branch/service: Ceylon Defence Force
- Rank: Colonel
- Unit: Ceylon Light Infantry
- Commands: Ceylon Light Infantry
- Battles/wars: World War I

Colonel Theodore Godfrey Wijesinghe Jayewardene, VD, JP, CLI (June 17, 1872 – 1945; also known as T. G. Jayewardene) was a Ceylonese (Sri Lankan) engineer, military officer and later politician. A member of the State Council of Ceylon, he was the first Ceylonese commanding officer of the Ceylon Light Infantry.

== Early life and education ==
Born to James Alfred Jayewardene, a Proctor who was the Deputy Coroner of Colombo, his brothers were Hector Alfred Jayewardene, Justice Eugene Wilfred Jayewardene, KC and Justice John Adrian St. Valentine Jayewardene. Jayewardene was educated at the Royal College, Colombo.

== Career ==
After becoming an engineer, he joined the Public Works Department in 1895 as an assistant engineer and in 1900 became a fully qualified Civil Engineer. He was elected to the State Council of Ceylon in 1933 from the Balangoda seat and held it till 1936.

== Military service ==
He joined the Ceylon Light Infantry, a reservist regiment of the Ceylon Defence Force, in 1889 as a private. However he was later commissioned and quickly rose through the ranks, becoming a major in 1908. In 1921 he was appointed as the intelligence officer of the Ceylon Defence Force. Promoted to lieutenant colonel, he served as the first Ceylonese commanding officer of the Ceylon Light Infantry from August 1919 to August 1923. He reached the rank of colonel, the highest rank a Ceylonese could achieve in the colonial era and was awarded the Volunteer Officers' Decoration.

== Family ==
In 1905, he married Lena Attygalle, daughter of Mudaliyar Don Charles Gemoris Attygalle with whom he had a son Major Theodore Frederick, who was elected to the Parliament in 1948. His daughter Margie Jayewardene married A. F. Wijemanne, who was a senator and Minister of Justice (1965–1970). His brothers-in-law were Fredrick Richard Senanayake and John Kotelawala Sr. His nephew J. R. Jayewardene was the first executive president of Sri Lanka.

One of Colombo's primary roads, Colonel T. G. Jayewardene Mawatha, has been named in his honor.

=== Turret House ===
T. G. Jayewardene was the owner of Turret House, a prominent Colombo residence situated on Turret Road (later renamed Dharmapala Mawatha). The property, recorded as Bearing Assessment No. 76 Turret Road, extended over more than three acres, with landscaped gardens spanning both sides of Turret Road and Green Path and stretching up to Alwis Place. Owing to its size and location, Turret House became one of the most recognisable private estates in early-20th-century Colombo.

Jayewardene gifted Turret House itself to his only son, T. F. Jayewardene, who later lived on the property. The surrounding gardens, which formed the bulk of the three-acre estate, were divided among his daughters. One of these portions—situated beside Alwis Place was given to a daughter who married Carlton Corea. On this land, Corea built Carlton Lodge, which today houses the Capri Club, a long-standing private members’ club in Colombo.

A major road in Colombo 3, Colonel T. G. Jayewardene Mawatha, was named in his honour, reflecting both his prominence in the Colombo military–civil establishment and his family's historical connection to the area.

== See also ==
- List of political families in Sri Lanka
