= Hector Wilfred Jayewardene =

Sri Lankan lawyer (1916–1990)

Deshamanya Hector Wilfred "Harry" Jayewardene, QC (November 3, 1916 - April 20, 1990) was a prominent Sri Lankan lawyer. In 1979 he was chairman of a UNESCO conference on human rights in Bangkok and later chairman of the Sri Lanka Foundation Institute. He was member at the United Nations Commission on Human Rights.

== Early life and education ==
Born to Justice Eugene Wilfred Jayewardene, KC and Agnes Helen Don Philip Wijewardena, he was the younger brother of J. R. Jayewardene, former president of Sri Lanka. Educated at the Royal College, Colombo, where he excelled in rugby and debating. Following the family trade, he entered Ceylon Law College to study law. At the law college, he won the Prize for Law of Evidence and the Hector Jayewardene Gold Medal for Oratory. Passing the examinations with First Class Honours, he was called to the bar in 1941 as an advocate.

== Legal career ==
Jayewardene started his career as a junior to M. T. de S. Amarasekera, KC; N. K. Choksy, KC and H. V. Perera, QC. He quickly gained a reputation as a trial lawyer in both civil and criminal law in the unofficial bar, with a strong practice in the appellate courts. He became the youngest person to be named to the prestigious position of Queen's Counsel in 1954. He was part of the defense of the 1962 attempted coup suspects and defended Royal Dutch Shell ownership in Ceylon when nationalized in the 1960s. He was the principal legal adviser to his brother J. R. Jayewardene, and the architect of the amendments to the Constitution of Sri Lanka in the late 1970s and early 1980s and served as a Special Envoy to the president.

Jayewardene was elected to many high positions within the Sri Lankan Legal profession, such as the First President of the Bar Association of Sri Lanka, President Law Association, President Organization of Professionals Association. He was also the Vice President, Commonwealth Lawyers Association.

== Honors ==
In 1985 he was awarded an honorary LLD from the University of Colombo and awarded the title of Deshamanya in 1988 by the president of Sri Lanka.

== Family ==
He married Claribel Fernando, daughter of Dr C H Fernando in August 1946. They had four daughters and a son, Dr Hiran Jayewardene.

== See also ==
- List of political families in Sri Lanka
