= J. R. Jayewardene =

President of Sri Lanka from 1978 to 1989

His Excellency J. R. Jayewardene
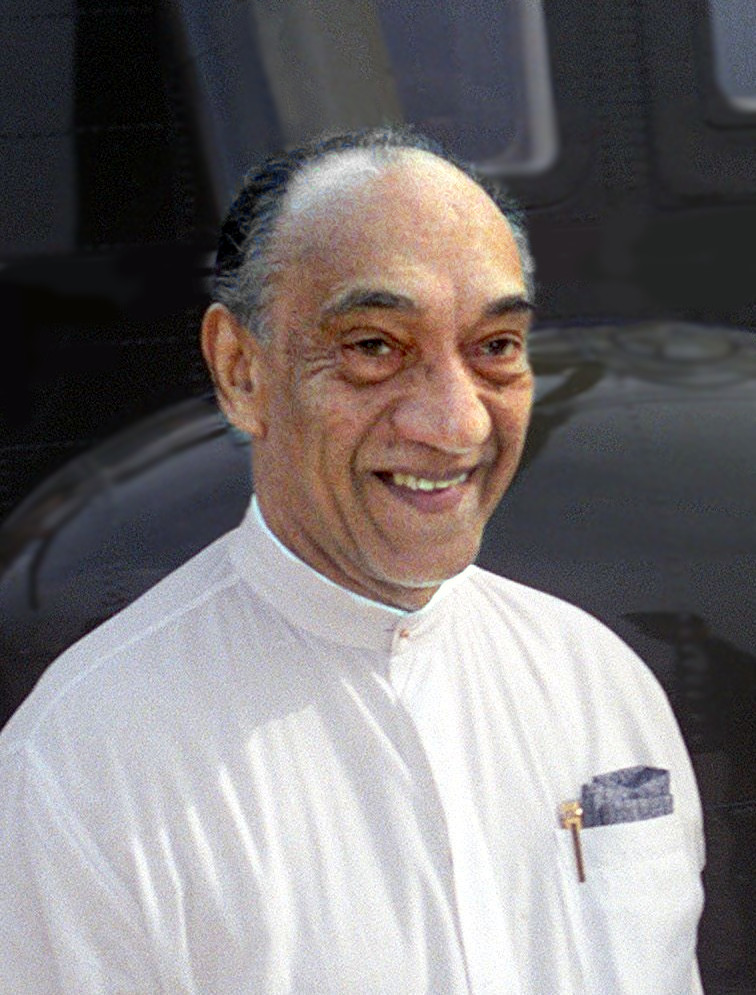
- Jayewardene in 1984

2nd President of Sri Lanka
- In office 4 February 1978 – 2 January 1989
- Prime Minister: Ranasinghe Premadasa
- Preceded by: William Gopallawa
- Succeeded by: Ranasinghe Premadasa

10th Prime Minister of Sri Lanka
- In office 23 July 1977 – 4 February 1978
- President: William Gopallawa
- Preceded by: Sirimavo Bandaranaike
- Succeeded by: Ranasinghe Premadasa

6th Leader of the Opposition
- In office 7 June 1970 – 18 May 1977
- Prime Minister: Sirimavo Bandaranaike
- Preceded by: Sirimavo Bandaranaike
- Succeeded by: A. Amirthalingam

6th Secretary General of Non-Aligned Movement
- In office 4 February 1978 – 9 September 1979
- Preceded by: William Gopallawa
- Succeeded by: Fidel Castro

Minister of Finance
- In office 24 April 1960 – 20 July 1960
- Prime Minister: Dudley Senanayake
- Preceded by: Oliver Goonetilleke
- Succeeded by: Stanley de Zoysa
- In office 26 September 1947 – 13 October 1953
- Prime Minister: D. S. Senanayake; Dudley Senanayake
- Preceded by: Oliver Goonetilleke (as Financial Secretary)
- Succeeded by: Oliver Goonetilleke

Member of Parliament for Colombo West
- In office 4 August 1977 – 4 February 1978
- Preceded by: Constituency created
- Succeeded by: Anura Bastian

Member of Parliament for Colombo South
- In office 5 August 1960 – 18 May 1977
- Preceded by: Edmund Samarawickrema
- Succeeded by: Constituency abolished

Member of the Ceylonese Parliament for Kelaniya
- In office 30 March 1960 – 23 April 1960
- Preceded by: R. G. Senanayake
- Succeeded by: R. S. Perera
- In office 14 October 1947 – 18 February 1956
- Preceded by: Constituency created
- Succeeded by: R. G. Senanayake

Personal details
- Born: Junius Richard Jayewardene; 17 September 1906 Colombo, British Ceylon (now Sri Lanka)
- Died: 1 November 1996 (aged 90) Colombo, Sri Lanka
- Party: United National Party
- Spouse: Elina Jayewardene (m. 1935)
- Children: Ravi Jayewardene (Son)
- Parents: Eugene Wilfred Jayewardene (father); Agnes Helen Wijewardene (mother)
- Education: Colombo Law College, University College, Colombo, Royal College, Colombo
- Profession: Advocate

Junius Richard Jayewardene (Sinhala: ජුනියස් රිචඩ් ජයවර්ධන; Tamil: ஜூனியஸ் ரிச்சட் ஜயவர்தனா; 17 September 1906 – 1 November 1996), also known by his initials JR, was a Sri Lankan lawyer who served as prime minister of Sri Lanka from 1977 to 1978 and as president of Sri Lanka from 1978 to 1989. He was a leader of the nationalist movement in Ceylon and served in a variety of cabinet positions in the decades following independence. A longtime member of the United National Party, he led the party to a landslide victory in the 1977 parliamentary elections and served as prime minister for half a year before becoming the country's first executive president under an amended constitution.

Jayawardene remains a divisive figure in Sri Lankan history. While the open economic system he introduced in 1978 brought the country out of the economic turmoil it was facing as the result of the preceding government's closed economic policies, Jayawardene's social policies, including his response to the Black July riots of 1983, heightened ethnic tensions in the country and resulted in the beginnings of the Sri Lankan civil war, which lasted from 1983 to 2009.

== Early life and marriage ==
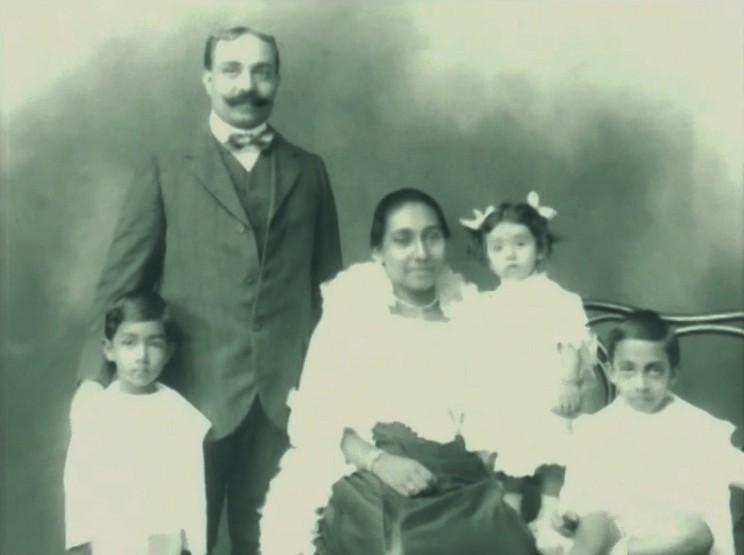
J. R. with his parents and siblings.

=== Childhood ===
Born in Colombo to the prominent Jayewardene family with a strong association with the legal profession, Jayewardene was the eldest of twelve children, of Hon. Justice Eugene Wilfred Jayewardene KC, a prominent lawyer and Agnes Helen Don Philip Wijewardena daughter of Muhandiram Tudugalage Don Philip Wijewardena a wealthy timber merchant. He was known as Dickie within his family. His younger brothers included Hector Wilfred Jayewardene, QC and Rolly Jayewardene, FRCP. His uncles were the Colonel Theodore Jayewardene, Justice Valentine Jayewardene and the media baron D. R. Wijewardena. Raised by an English nanny,

=== Education and early career ===
Jayewardene gained admission to Royal College, Colombo for his secondary education. There he excelled in sports, played for the college cricket team, debuting in the Royal–Thomian series in 1925; captained the rugby team in 1924 at the annual "Royal–Trinity Encounter" (which later became known as the Bradby Shield Encounter); he was the vice-captain of the football team in 1924; and was a member of the boxing team winning sports colours. He was a Senior Cadet; Captain, Debating Team; editor of the college magazine; first Secretary of the Royal College Social Services League in 1921 and the head prefect in 1925. In later life, he served as president, Board of Control for Cricket in Sri Lanka; President, Singhalese Sports Club; and Secretary, Royal College Union.

Following the family tradition, Jayewardene entered the University College, Colombo in 1926, pursuing the Advocate's course, reading English, Latin, Logic and Economics for two years, after which he entered Ceylon Law College in 1928. He formed the College Union based on that of the Oxford Union with the assistance of S. W. R. D. Bandaranaike who had recently returned to Ceylon. At the Ceylon Law College, he won the Hector Jayewardene Gold Medal and the Walter Pereira Prize in 1929. During this time he worked as his father's private secretary, while later served as a Puisne Justice of Supreme Court of Ceylon and in July 1929, he joined three others in forming a dining club they called The Honorable Society of Pushcannons, which was later renamed as the Priya Sangamaya. In 1931, he passed his advocates exams, starting his legal practice in the unofficial bar.

=== Marriage ===
On 28 February 1935, Jayewardene married the heiress Elina Bandara Rupasinghe, only daughter of Nancy Margaret Suriyabandara and Gilbert Leonard Rupasinghe, a notary public turned successful businessman. Their only child Ravindra "Ravi" Vimal Jayewardene was born the year after. Having originally settled at Jayewardene's parents house, Vaijantha, the Jayewardenes moved to their own house Braemar in 1938, where they remained the rest of their lives, when not holidaying at their holiday home in Mirissa.

== Early political career ==
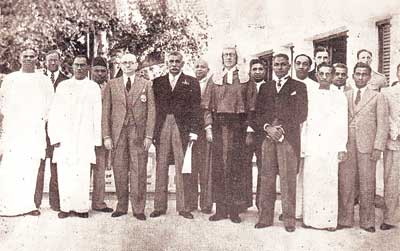
The first Cabinet of Ministers of Ceylon

Jayewardene was attracted to national politics in his student years and developed strong nationalist views. He converted from Anglicanism to Buddhism and adopted the national dress as his formal attire.

Jayewardene did not practice law for long. In 1943 he gave up his full-time legal practice to become an activist in the Ceylon National Congress (CNC), which provided the organizational platform for Ceylon's nationalist movement (the island was officially renamed Sri Lanka in 1972). He became its Joint Secretary with Dudley Senanayake in 1939 and 1940 he was elected to the Colombo Municipal Council from the New Bazaar Ward.

=== State Council ===
He was elected to the colonial legislature, the State Council in 1943 by winning the Kelaniya by-election following the resignation of incumbent D. B. Jayatilaka. His victory is credited to his use of an anti-Christian campaign against his opponent the nationalist E. W. Perera. During World War II, Jayewardene, along with other nationalists, contacted the Japanese and discussed a rebellion to drive the British from the island. In 1944, Jayewardene moved a motion in the State Council that Sinhala alone should replace English as the official language.

Government

After joining the United National Party on its formation in 1946 as a founder member, he was reelected from the Kelaniya electorate in the 1st parliamentary election and was appointed by D. S. Senanayake as the Minister of Finance in the island's first Cabinet in 1947. Initiating post-independence reforms, he was instrumental in the establishment of the Central Bank of Ceylon under the guidance of the American economist John Exter. In 1951 Jayewardene was a member of the committee to select a National Anthem for Sri Lanka headed by Sir Edwin Wijeyeratne. The following year he was elected as the President of the Board of Control for Cricket in Ceylon. He played a major role in re-admitting Japan to the world community at the San Francisco Conference. Jayewardene struggled to balance the budget, faced with mounting government expenditures, particularly for rice subsidies. He was re-elected in 1952 parliamentary election and remained as finance minister.

His 1953 proposal to cut the subsidies on which many poor people depended for survival provoked fierce opposition and the 1953 Hartal campaign and had to be called off. Following the resignation of Prime Minister Dudley Senanayake after the 1953 Hartal, the new Prime Minister Sir John Kotelawala appointed Jayewardene as minister of agriculture and food and leader of the house.

Defeat and opposition

Prime Minister Sir John Kotelawala called for early elections in 1956 with confidence that the United National Party would win the election. The 1956 parliamentary election saw the United National Party suffering a crushing defeat at the hands of the socialist and nationalist coalition led by the Sri Lanka Freedom Party headed by S. W. R. D. Bandaranaike. Jayewardene himself lost his parliamentary seat in Kelaniya to R. G. Senanayake, who had contested both his constituency Dambadeniya and Jayewardene's constituency of Kelaniya to defeat the latter after he had forced Senanayake out of the party.

Having lost his seat in parliament, Jayewardene pushed the party to accommodate nationalism and endorse the Sinhala Only Act, which was bitterly opposed by the island's minorities. When Bandaranaike agreed with S. J. V. Chelvanayakam in 1957, to solve the outstanding problems of the minorities, Jayawardene led a "March on Kandy" against it, but was stopped at Imbulgod. The U.N.P.'s official organ the Siyarata subsequently ran several anti-Tamil articles, including a poem, containing an exhortation to kill Tamils in almost every line. Throughout the 1960s Jayewardene clashed over this issue with party leader Dudley Senanayake. Jayewardene felt the UNP should be willing to play the ethnic card, even if it meant losing the support of ethnic minorities.

Return to government

Jayewardene became the vice-president and chief organizer of the United National Party, which achieved a narrow win in the March 1960 parliamentary election, forming a government under Dudley Senanayake. Jayewardene having been elected to parliament once again from the Kelaniya electorate was appointed once again as minister of finance. The government lasted only three months and lost the July 1960 parliamentary election to a new coalition led by Bandaranayake's widow. Jayewardene remained in parliament in the opposition having been elected from the Colombo South electorate.

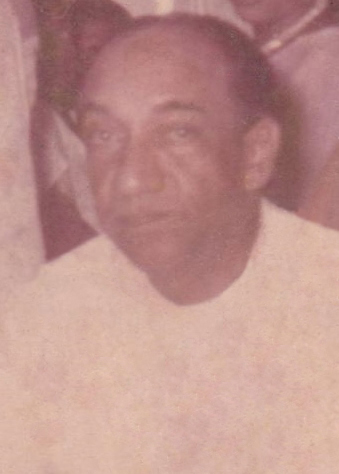
J. R. Jayewardene in the 1970s

The United National Party won the next election in 1965 and formed a national government with the Sri Lanka Freedom Socialist Party led by C. P. de Silva. Jayewardene was reelected from the Colombo South electorate uncontested and was appointed Chief Government Whip. Senanayake appointed Jayewardene to his cabinet as Minister of State and Parliamentary Secretary to the Minister of Defence and External Affairs thereby becoming the de facto deputy prime minister. No government had given serious thought to the development of the tourism industry as an economically viable venture until the United National Party came to power in 1965 and the subject came under the purview of J. R. Jayewardene. Jayewardene saw tourism as a great industry capable of earning foreign exchange, providing avenues of mass employment, and creating a workforce which commanded high employment potential globally. He was determined to place this industry on a solid foundation, providing it a 'conceptional base and institutional support.' This was necessary to bring dynamism and cohesiveness into an industry, shunned by leaders in the past, and ignored by investors who were inhibited by the lack of incentive to invest in projects which were uncertain of a satisfactory return. Jayewardene considered it essential for the government to give that assurance and with this objective in view, he tabled the Ceylon Tourist Board Act No 10 of 1966 followed by Ceylon Hotels Corporation Act No 14 of 1966. At present the tourism industry in Sri Lanka is a major foreign exchange earner with tourist resorts in almost all cities and an annual turnover of over 500,000 tourists enjoying the tropical climes and beaches.

== Leader of the opposition ==
In the general election of 1970, the UNP suffered a major defeat, when the SLFP and its newly formed coalition of leftist parties won almost 2/3 of the parliamentary seats. Once again elected to parliament J. R. Jayewardene took over as opposition leader and de facto leader of the UNP due to the ill health of Dudley Senanayake. After Senanayake died in 1973, Jayewardene succeeded him as UNP leader. He gave the SLFP government his fullest support during the 1971 JVP Insurrection and in 1972 when the new constitution was enacted proclaiming Ceylon a republic. However, he opposed the government in many moves, which he saw as short-sighted and damaging to the country's economy in the long run. These included the adaptation of the closed economy and nationalization of many private businesses and lands.

== Prime minister ==
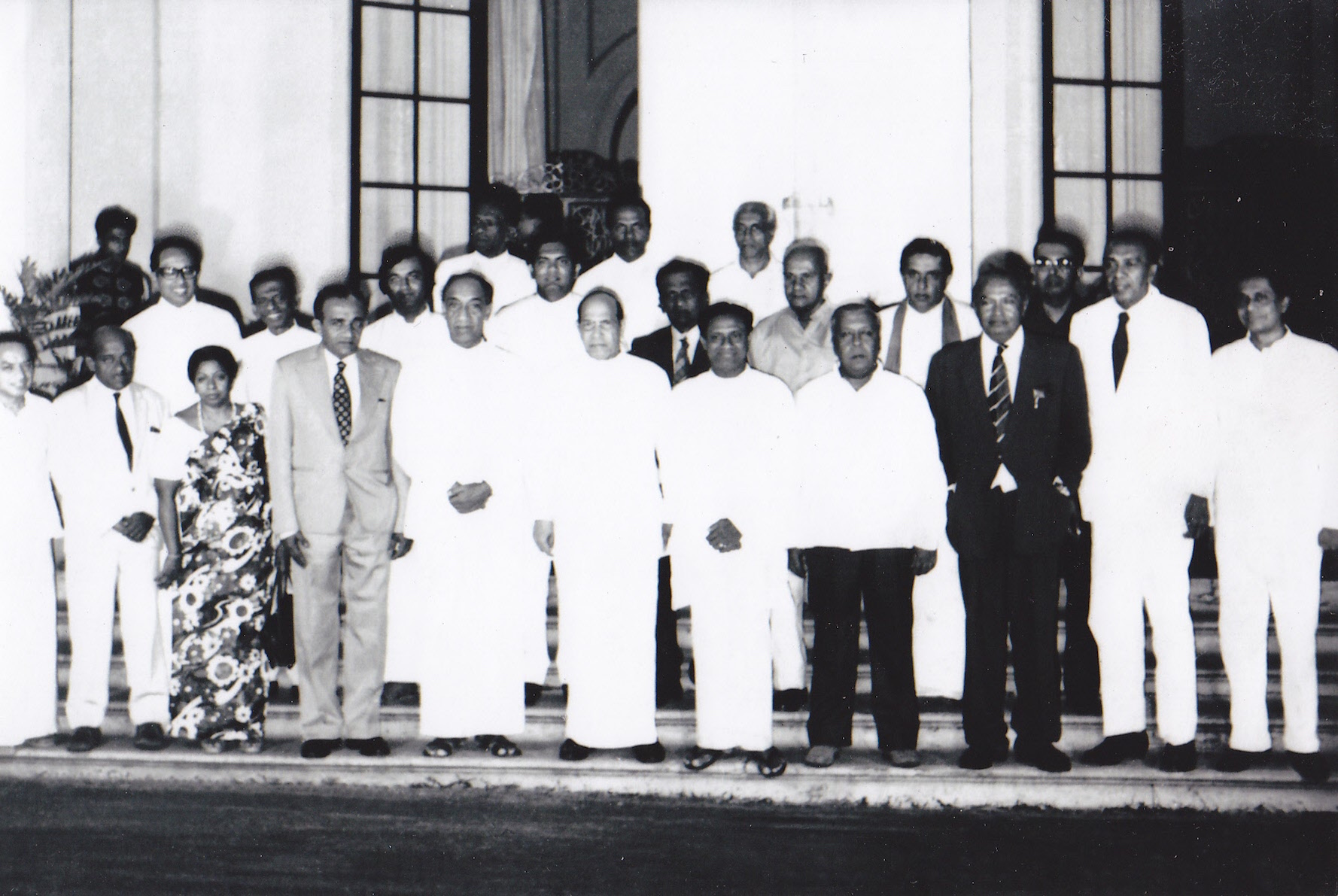
President William Gopallawa and Prime Minister J.R. Jayewardene with the cabinet of ministers in 1977 after being sworn in.

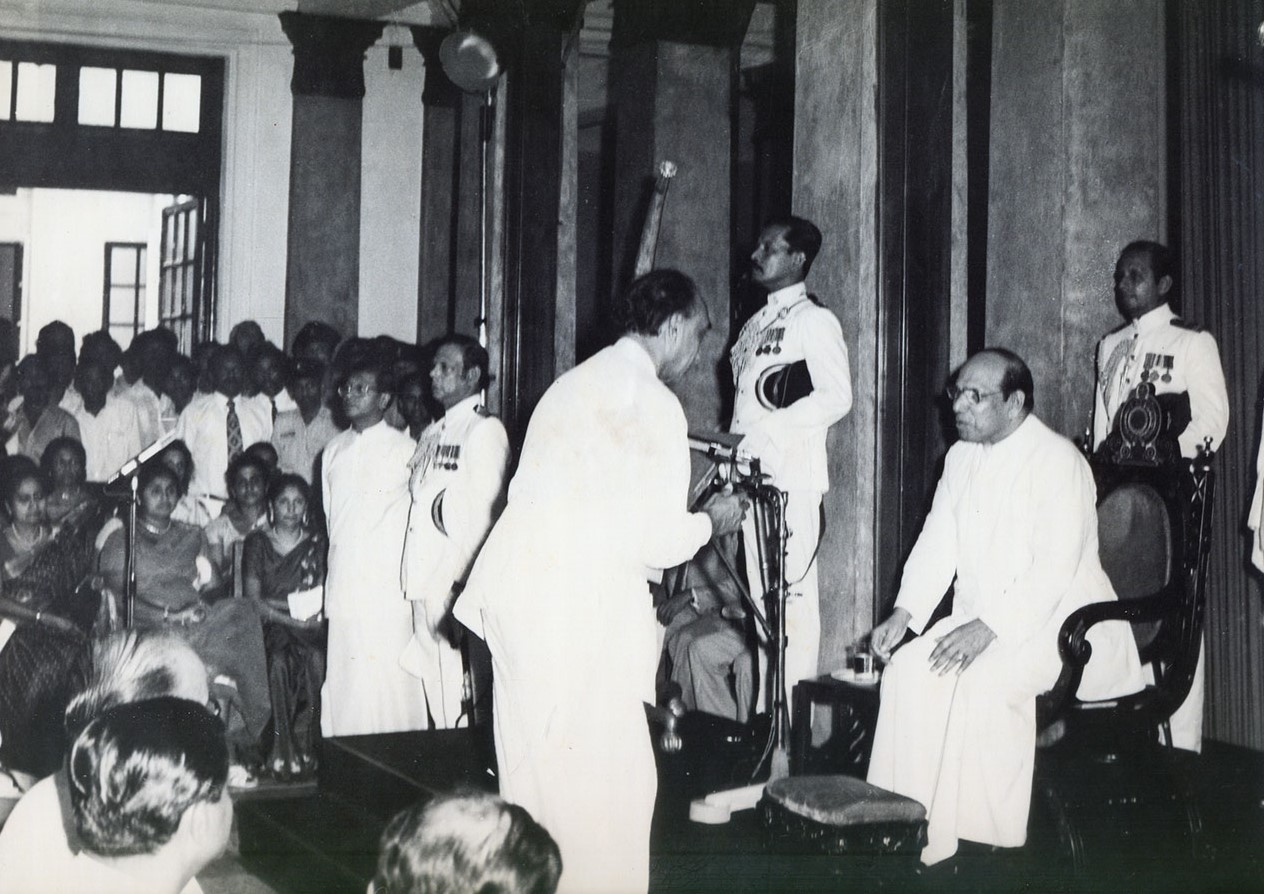
President William Gopallawa appoints Jayawardene as the Prime Minister on 23 July 1977, following the victory in the 1977 General election.

Tapping into growing anger with the SLFP government, Jayewardene led the UNP to a crushing victory in the 1977 election which held on 21 July 1977. The UNP won a staggering five-sixths of the seats in parliament—a total that was magnified by the first-past-the-post system, and one of the most lopsided victories ever recorded for a democratic election. Having been elected to parliament from the Colombo West Electoral District, Jayewardene was sowrn in as Prime Minister and invited to form a new government by President William Gopallawa on 23 July 1977.

Shortly after becoming Prime Minister, drafted the Second Amendment to the Constitution of 1972 to make the presidency an executive post. The Amendment was passed in the Parliament on 4 October 1977. The provisions of the amendment automatically made the incumbent prime minister—himself—president, and the transition was scheduled to take place on 4 February 1978, on the 30th anniversary of Sri Lanka's independence.

== Presidency ==
Presidential Standard of Junius Richard Jayewardene

Jayawardene was sworn as the 1st Executive President of Sri Lanka on 4 February 1978, at an Inauguration Ceremony held in the Galle Face Green in Colombo. His oath of office was administered by Chief Justice Neville Samarakoon. Two days later, he appointed Ranasinghe Premadasa as the New Prime Minister.

He passed a new constitution on 31 August 1978 which came into operation on 7 September of the same year, which granted the president sweeping—and according to some critics, almost dictatorial—powers. He moved the legislative capital from Colombo to Sri Jayawardanapura Kotte. He had likely SLFP presidential nominee Sirimavo Bandaranaike stripped of her civic rights and barred from running for office for seven years, to have a clear path to victory. This ensured that the SLFP would be unable to field a strong candidate against him in the 1982 election, leaving his path to victory clear. This election was held under the 3rd amendment to the constitution which empowered the president to hold a Presidential Election anytime after the expiration of four years of his first term. He held a controversial referendum to cancel the 1983 parliamentary elections, and allow the 1977 parliament to continue until 1989, which was heavily criticised by the opposition parties. He also passed a constitutional amendment barring from Parliament any MP who supported separatism; this effectively eliminated the main opposition party, the Tamil United Liberation Front.

=== Economy ===
There was a complete turnaround in economic policy under him as the previous policies had led to economic stagnation. He opened the heavily state-controlled economy to market forces, which many credit with subsequent economic growth. He opened up the economy and introduced more liberal economic policies emphasizing private sector-led development. Policies were changed to create an environment conducive to foreign and local investment, to promote export-led growth shifting from previous policies of import substitution. To facilitate export-oriented enterprises and to administer Export Processing Zones the Greater Colombo Economic Commission was established. Food subsidies were curtailed and targeted through a Food Stamps Scheme extended to the poor. The system of rice rationing was abolished. The Floor Price Scheme and the Fertilizer Subsidy Scheme were withdrawn. New welfare schemes, such as free school books and the Mahapola Scholarship Programme, were introduced. The rural credit programme expanded with the introduction of the New Comprehensive Rural Credit Scheme and several other medium and long-term credit schemes aimed at small farmers and the self-employed.

=== Tamil militancy and civil war ===
Jayewardene moved to crack down on the growing activity of Tamil militant groups active since the mid-1970s. He passed the Prevention of Terrorism Act in 1979, giving police sweeping powers to arrest and detain. This only escalated the ethnic tensions. Jayewardene claimed he needed overwhelming power to deal with the militants. After the 1977 riots, the government made one concession to the Tamils; it lifted the policy of standardization for university admission that had driven many Tamil youths into militancy. The concession was regarded by the militants as too little and too late, and violent attacks continued, culminating in the ambush of Four Four Bravo which led to the Black July riots. Black July riots transformed the militancy into a civil war, with the swelling ranks of the militant groups.

In April 1985, Jayewardene sent M. H. Mohamed, along with his henchmen to attack Tamils in the village of Karaitivu (Ampara). Muslim youth with the support of the security forces killed several Tamils, raped several women and burned over 2000 Tamil homes, rendering 15,000 Tamils homeless.

Jayewardene previously granted a presidential pardon on 7 July 1981 to Gonawala Sunil, who was one of the most notorious criminal leaders in Sri Lanka and was associated with the United National Party (UNP). Sunil was serving a prison sentence for raping a 17-year-old girl. He was pardoned on the day Sri Lanka was celebrating the country's 50th Anniversary of gaining universal franchise. He was later involved in the massacre of 53 tamil prisoners at Welikada Prison during the 1983 Black July pogrom. Subsequently, he was made an all-island Justice of the Peace (JP).

By 1987, the LTTE had emerged as the dominant of the Tamil militant groups and had a free hand over the Jaffna Peninsula, limiting government activities in that region. Jayewardene's administration responded with a massive military operation codenamed Operation Liberation to eliminate the LTTE leadership. Jayewardene had to halt the offensive after pressure from India pushed for a negotiated solution to the conflict after executing Operation Poomalai. Jayewardene and Indian Prime Minister Rajiv Gandhi finally concluded the Indo-Sri Lanka Accord, which provided for devolution of powers to Tamil-dominated regions, an Indian peacekeeping force in the north, and the demobilization of the LTTE.

The LTTE rejected the accord, as it fell short of even an autonomous state. The provincial councils suggested by India did not have powers to control revenue, policing, or government-sponsored Sinhala settlements in Tamil provinces. Sinhala nationalists were outraged by both the devolution and the presence of foreign troops on Sri Lankan soil. An attempt was made on Jayewardene's life in 1987 as a result of his signing of the accord. Young, deprived Sinhalese soon rose in a revolt, organized by the Janatha Vimukthi Peramuna (JVP) which was eventually put down by the government by 1989.

=== Foreign policy ===
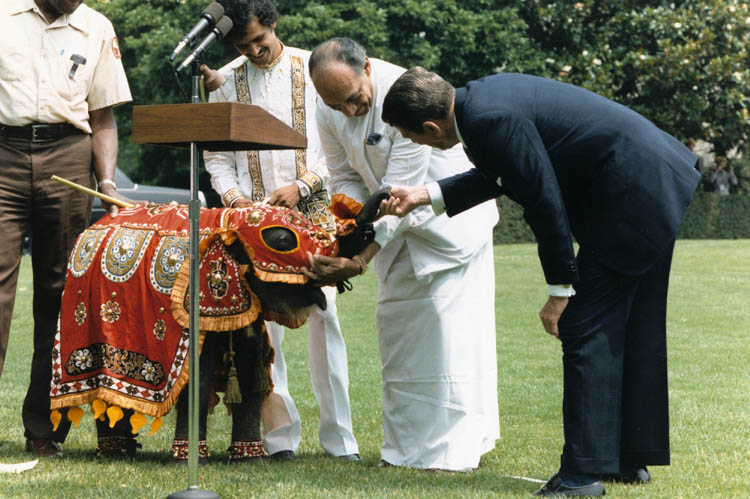
Jayewardene presenting a baby elephant to US President Ronald Reagan and the American people, 1984

In contrast with his predecessor, Sirimavo Bandaranaike, Jayewardene's foreign policy was aligned with American policies (earning him the nickname 'Yankie Dickie') much to the chagrin of India. Indian Prime Minister Indira Gandhi despised Jayewardene, referring to him as a "western puppet". Before Jayewardene's ascendency into the presidency, Sri Lanka had doors widely open to neighboring India. Jayewardene's tenure in the office restricted the doors to India several times; once an American company tender was granted over an Indian company tender.

Jayewardene hosted Queen Elizabeth II on a visit to Sri Lanka in October 1981.

In 1984, Jayewardene made an official State visit the United States; first Sri Lankan President to do so, upon the invitation of then US President Ronald Reagan.

== Later years ==
Jayewardene left office and retired from politics in 1989 after the conclusion of his second term as president at the age of 82; after his successor Ranasinghe Premadasa was formally inaugurated on 2 January 1989. He did not re-enter politics during his retirement even after the assassination of Premadasa in 1993.

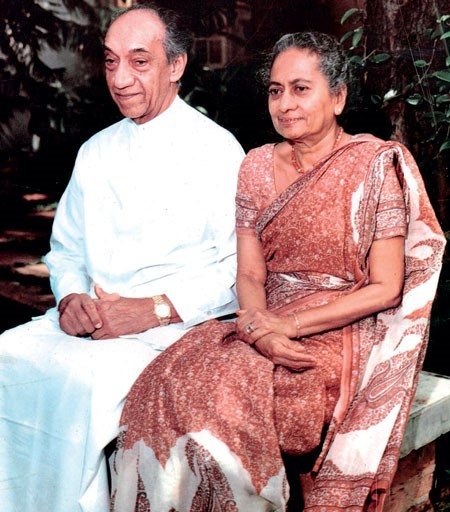
President Jayawardene with his wife and first lady, Elina, on their 50th Wedding Anniversary in 1985.

Death

Jayewardene died of colon cancer, on 1 November 1996, aged 90, at a hospital in Colombo. He was survived by his wife, Elina, and his son, Ravi. The government had announced that the state funeral would be held at Independence Square, a site of national significance where many of Sri Lanka's greatest leaders have been cremated. United National Party (UNP) leader Ranil Wickremesinghe also expressed his support for this location, honoring the late President's stature and legacy.

However, a compelling personal request emerged from the late President's only son, Ravi Jayewardene. He revealed a diary entry written by his father in 1991, in which the former president had clearly expressed his final wish. The note read:

"Please cremate my body within 24 hours of my death on the Kelaniya river bank."

This request reflected the President's deep connection to Kelaniya, his original political electorate, and highlighted his desire for a more personal and symbolic farewell.

== Legacy ==
On the economic front, Jayewardene's legacy is decisively a positive one. His economic policies are often credited with saving the Sri Lankan economy from ruin. For thirty years after independence, Sri Lanka had struggled in vain with slow growth and high unemployment. By opening up the country for extensive foreign investments, lifting price controls and promoting private enterprise (which had taken a heavy hit because of the policies of the preceding administration), Jayewardene ensured that the island maintained healthy growth despite the civil war. William K. Steven of The New York Times observes, "President Jayawardene's economic policies were credited with transforming the economy from one of scarcity to one of abundance."

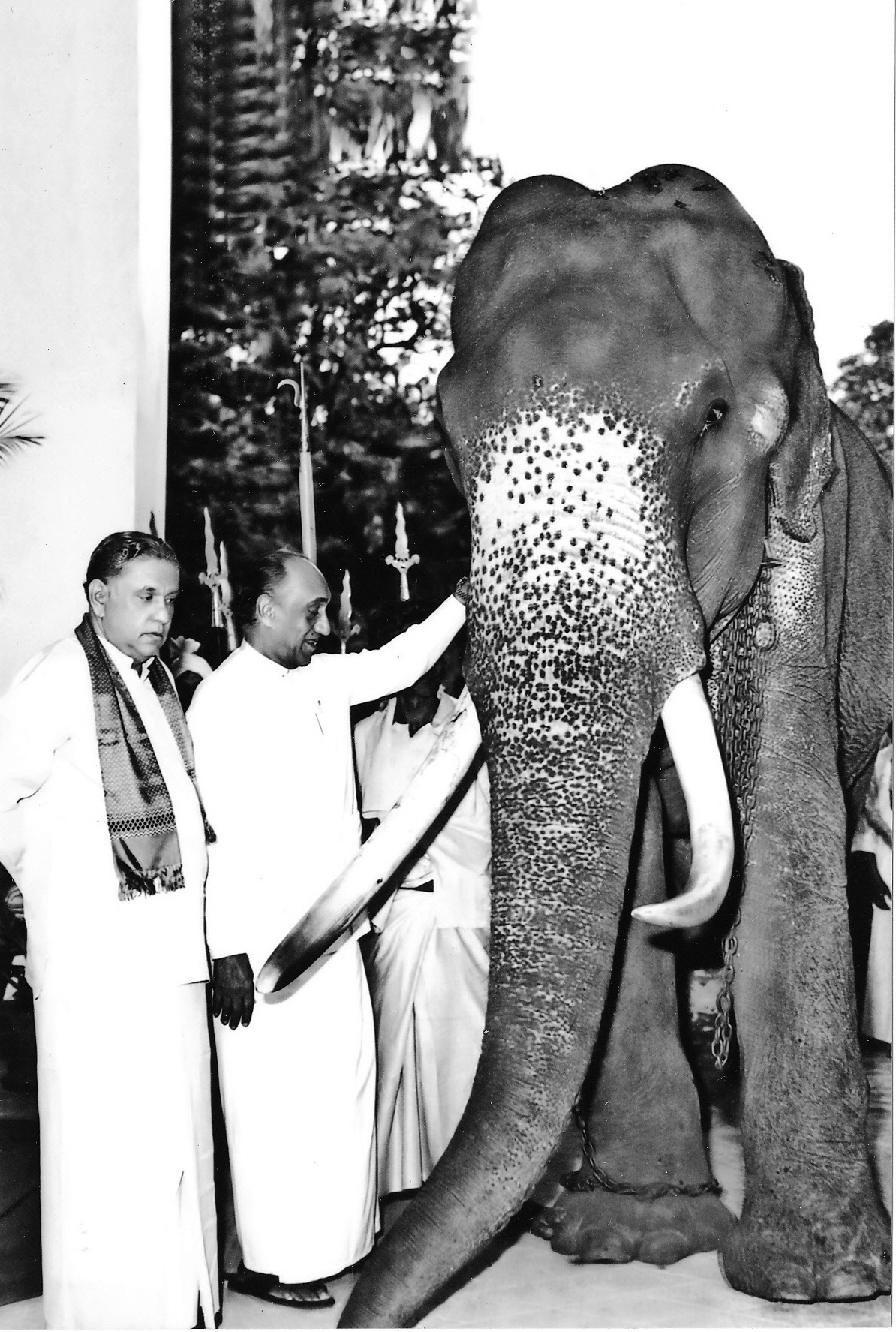
President J. R. Jayewardene and Diyawadana Nilame Dr. Nissanka Wijeyeratne with Raja

On the ethnic question, Jayewardene's legacy is bitterly divisive. When he took office, ethnic tensions were present in the country but were not overtly volatile. But relations between the two ethnicities heavily deteriorated during his administration and his response to these tensions and the signs of conflict has been heavily criticized. President Jayewardene saw these differences between the Sinhalese and Tamils as being ''an unbridgeable gap''. Jayewardene said in an interview with the Daily Telegraph, 11 July 1983, "Really, if I starve the Tamils out, the Sinhala people will be happy" about the widespread anti-Tamil sentiments among the Sinhalese at that time.

The Jaffna Public Library was burned by an organised mob of Sinhalese police and army on the night of 31 May 1981, on the orders of members of the ruling UNP party. The library's burning was one of the most violent examples of ethnically motivated biblioclasm of the 20th century. At the time of its destruction, the library was one of the biggest in Asia, containing over 97,000 books and manuscripts. The national newspapers did not report the incident. Later that year, Jayewardene admitted to the foreign press that the UNP had encouraged the anti-Tamil violence.

Highly respected in Japan for his call for peace and reconciliation with post-war Japan at the Peace Conference in San Francisco in 1951, a statue of Jayewardene was erected at the Kamakura Temple in the Kanagawa Prefecture in Japan in his honor. Former Singaporean premier, Lee Kuan Yew who was initially positive about Jayawardene, praising his pragmatic economic policies but ultimately considered that by the end of his presidency, he was a tired man who had run out of solutions.

=== J. R. Jayewardene Centre ===
In 1988, the J. R. Jayewardene Centre was established by the J.R. Jayewardene Centre Act No. 77 of 1988 by Parliament at the childhood home of J. R. Jayewardene Dharmapala Mawatha, Colombo. It serves as an archive for J. R. Jayewardene's library and papers as well as papers, records from the Presidential Secretariat and gifts he received in his tenure as president.

== See also ==
- Jayewardene cabinet
- Braemar, Colombo
- Vaijantha
- List of political families in Sri Lanka
- 1987 grenade attack in the Sri Lankan Parliament

Government offices
Preceded by William Gopallawa	President of Sri Lanka; 1978–1989	Succeeded by Ranasinghe Premadasa
Preceded by Sirimavo Ratwatte Dias Bandaranaike	Prime Minister of Sri Lanka; 1977–1978	Succeeded by Ranasinghe Premadasa
Political offices
Preceded by William Gopallawa	Secretary General of Non-Aligned Movement; 1978–1979	Succeeded by Fidel Castro
