= Eugene Wilfred Jayewardene =

Ceylonese judge, lawyer and politician (1874–1932)

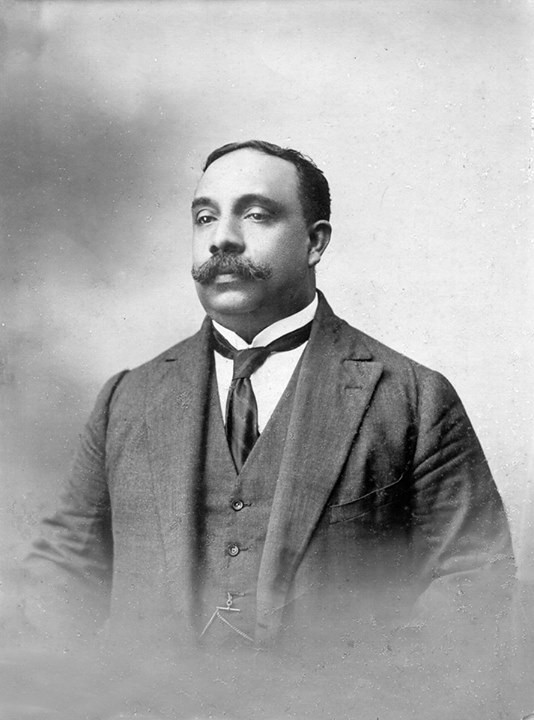
- Jayewardene, c. 1920s

Puisne Justice of the Supreme Court of Ceylon

Personal details
- Born: 11 June 1874 Kalutara, Sri Lanka
- Died: 23 November 1932 (aged 58) Colombo, Sri Lanka
- Education: Colombo Academy

Eugene Wilfred Jayewardene, KC (Sinhala:යුජින් විල්ෆ්‍රඩ් ජයවර්ධන; 11 June 1874 – 23 November 1932) was a Ceylonese (Sri Lankan) judge, lawyer and politician. He was a Judge of the Supreme Court of Ceylon and the father of J. R. Jayewardene, the first executive President of Sri Lanka.

== Early life and education ==
Born on 11 June 1874, to James Alfred Jayewardene, a proctor who was the Deputy Coroner of Colombo. Jayewardene was educated at the Colombo Academy. In 1897, he served as the acting private secretary to Justice Granier before leaving for England for his studies in law. After being called to the bar at the Inner Temple in 1908 as a barrister, he returned to Ceylon and started a legal career as an advocate. He was the president of the Law Students' Union. He joined the Ceylon Light Infantry, became a volunteer officer of the Ceylon Defence Force as second lieutenant and later made captain.

== Legal career ==
Jayewardene developed a successful legal practice in the unofficial bar. He served as an acting district judge (1910–1911) and later a police magistrate, he became the commissioner of requests in 1916 and was a member of the Legal Council of Education.

== Politics ==
In 1916, Jayewardene unsuccessfully sought nominations for the seat of Sinhalese representative to the Legislative Council of Ceylon. He then with his brother John Adrian St. Valentine Jayewardene joined the Ceylon National Congress and its congress committee in 1919. In 1920, he succeeded his brother Hector Alfred Jayewardene to the Colombo Municipal Council with the death of the latter. He contested the 1924 Legislative Council election and lost to Victor Corea, a distant relative who was backed by many of the leaders of the Ceylon National Congress. This effectively ended his political career.

== Personal life ==
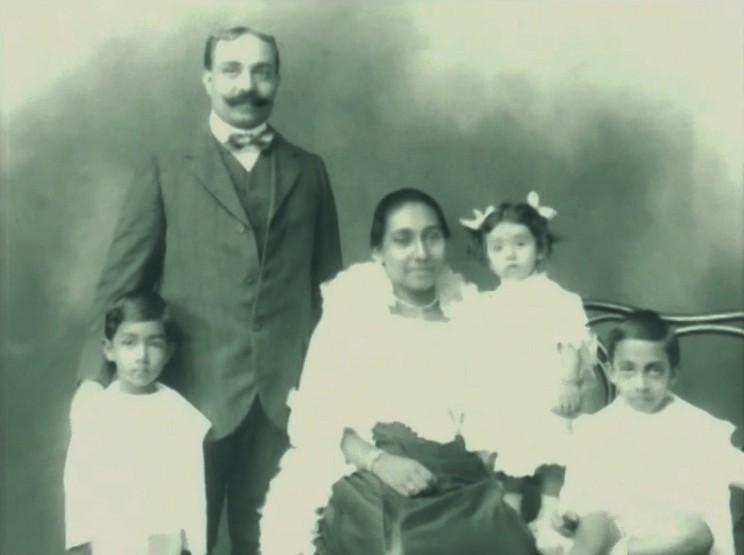
Wilfred Jayewardene with his family.

In 1905, Jayewardene married Agnes Helen Don Philip Wijewardena daughter of Muhandiram Tudugalage Don Philip Wijewardene and sister of D. R. Wijewardena. They had nine children, most notable of whom were J. R. Jayewardene and Hector Wilfred Jayewardene, QC. His brother Colonel T. G. Jayewardene was a Member of the State Council for Balangoda electorate. He died on 23 November 1932, aged 58, in Colombo.

== See also ==
- List of political families in Sri Lanka
