= List of Sri Lankan Malays =

This is a list of Sri Lankan Malays.

Sri Lankan Malay (Sinhala: (ශ්‍රී ලංකා) මැලේ ජනතාව Shri Lanka Mæle Janathava (Standard); මැලේ මිනිස්සු / ජා මිනිස්සු Mæle Minissu / Ja Minissu (Colloquially); Tamil: இலங்கை மலாய் மக்கள், romanized: Ilaṅkai Malāi Makkal) are Sri Lankans with full or partial ancestry from the Indonesian Archipelago, Malaysia, or Singapore. In addition, people from Brunei and the Philippines also consider themselves Malays. The term is a misnomer, as it is used as a historical catch-all term for all native ethnic groups of the Malay Archipelago who reside in Sri Lanka; the term does not apply solely to the ethnic Malays.

== Artists ==
- G. S. B. Rani – actress, singer, politician and media personality
- Ramzi Rahaman – fashion designer
- Umara Sinhawansa – singer
- Umaria Sinhawansa – singer
- Lakshmi Bhai – singer and sister of Devi Sakunthala
- Devi Sakunthala – singer

== Native headmen of ceylon ==
- Mudaliyar Baba Junoor Haji Bahar of Kalpitiya

=== Maniyagar ===
Maniyagar had several Udayars under his supervision

- Raden Matchjam Boorah Abu Cassim Miangar of Mannar

=== List of Prominent Malay Gate Mudaliyar ===
- Gate Mudaliyar Baba Hakim Muthaliph (1779–1839) of Magampattuwa
- Gate Mudaliyar Baba Thajul Arifin Doole (1834–1909) of Hambantota

== Politicians ==
=== Legislative Council of Ceylon (1833–1931) ===
- Tuan Burhanudeen Jayah (T. B. Jayah), member of Legislative Council (1924–1931), nominated member of the State Council of Ceylon (1936–1947), member for Colombo Central (1947–1950)

=== State Council of Ceylon (1931–1947) ===
- Mohamed Khalid Saldin (1870–1944), nominated member of the State Council of Ceylon (1931–1935)

=== House of Representatives (Ceylon) (1947–1972) ===
- M. P. Drahaman (born November 5, 1889, Colombo, d. 1963, Mecca) was a Ceylonese Malay medical doctor and politician. He was the leader of the All Ceylon Malay Congress, and was appointed as Member of Parliament in 1956 and 1960.
- Baba Zahiere Lye (1900–1969), nominated member of the Parliament of Ceylon (1963–1965)
- M. D. Kitchilan, appointed member of the Senate of Ceylon (1965–1971)

=== Parliament of Sri Lanka (1978–present) ===
- M. H. Amit, nominated member of the Parliament of Sri Lanka (1989)

== Judges and lawyers ==
=== Judges ===
- Justice Maas Thajoon Akbar KC (June 15, 1880 – April 22, 1944) – He was the 58th (1st Malay) Justices of the Supreme Court of Sri Lanka. He was the 8th (1st Malay) Solicitor General of Sri Lanka. He was appointed as the Solicitor General in 1925 and held the office until 1928.

== Physicians ==
- Dr. A R Deane (1918–2003)
- Dr. Anvar Hamdani

== Defence ==
=== Sri Lanka Army ===
- Brigadier T. S. B. Sally – Brigadier Tuan Samayraan Buhary Sally, SLSR was a Sri Lankan military leader, he was the Chief of Staff of the Sri Lanka Army and was the first Malay in the country to reach this rank and post.
- Brigadier T. M. Bohoran – SLE was a Sri Lankan military leader, he was the General Officer Commanding 56 Offensive Infantry Division during operations Jaya Sikurui, He was also the Commander, Engineer Brigade, Commanding Officer 1 Field Engineer Regiment and Aide De Camp (ADC) to Lt Gen GADGN Senewiratne, 10th Commander of the Sri Lanka Army.
- Brigadier T. B. Morseth RWP RSP – GR was a Sri Lankan military leader, He commanded the prestigious 3rd Gajaba Regiment and 8th Gajaba Regiment during many offensive operations conducted in the North & East in Sri Lanka. He was also the Centre Commandant of Gajaba Regiment and Commandant, Army Training Centre, Maduru Oya before migrating to Australia in 2005.
- Major General Tuan Fadyl Meedin RSP (Twice), Ldmc, MMS (Osm. Ind), MIT (C.Sturt, Aus), CSMP, M.ISMI (UK), 6th Colonel Commandant, Sri Lanka Signal Corps, 1st Chief Signal Officer, Chief Innovations Officer, 14th Signal Brigade Commander of Sri Lanka Army, 8th Centre Commandant, Sri Lanka Signal Corps and 1st Chief Controller, Centre for Research & Development, Ministry of Defence, Sri Lanka. Most senior rank signaller among Malays to have ever served the armed forces in Sri Lanka. He was promoted to the substantive rank of Major General with effective from 28 February 2011. He is also the 1st Sri Lankan CSMP Laureate from ISMI, UK.
- Major General M. Z. R. Sallay – He held the appointment of Colonel Commandant of the Sri Lanka Army Ordnance Corps from 2009 to 2014. He was promoted to the rank of Major General on 28 November 2013 marking the date in Sri Lankan Malay history books as the day our community produced its first ever Major General of the Sri Lanka Army.
- Major General Tuan Suraj Bangsajayah RWP RSP VSV USP ndu, Colonel of the Regiment, Gemunu Regiment, Commandant, Sri Lanka Army Volunteer Force, Director General General Staff, Army Headquarters, Commandant, Infantry Training Centre, Minneriya, Deputy General Officer Commanding, 58 Infantry (Offensive) Division during the last phase of the operation conducted to liberate North & East from LTTE terrorists.
- Colonel Tuan Rizly Meedin (27 July 1966 – 30 October 2005) General Staff Officer 1 of the Military Intelligence Directorate. (Rana Sura Padakkama (RSP), Sri Lanka Army 50th Anniversary Medal, Sri Lanka Armed Forces Long Service Medal, 50th Independence Anniversary Commemoration Medal, Deshaputhra Sammanaya, North and East Operational Medal, Purna Bhumi Padakkama, Vadamarachchi Operational Medal and Riviresa Campaign Service Medal.) Former Commanding Officer of the 2nd Battalion Military Intelligence Corps. (MIC)
- Colonel Tuan Nizam Muthaliff RWP, MI (July 12, 1966 – May 31, 2005) (O/60727) was the former Commanding Officer of the 1st Battalion Military Intelligence Corps. (MIC)
- Colonel Tuan Nizam (Raja) Dane RWP, (Killed in action – June 24, 1997 during Operation Jaya Sikurui) was the former Commanding Officer of the 10th Battalion, Vijayabahu Infantry Regiment of the Sri Lanka Army
- Captain Akmal Hamza ( Sinha Regiment )
- Captain B.Haroon Preena ( Mechanized Infantry Regiment )
- 2nd Lt. Jehan Sheriffdeen

=== Sri Lanka Air Force ===
- Wing Commander Retired Tuan Rajioon Singalaxana (RCyAF/SLAF)
- Wing Commander Faizal Cassiere died in SLAF Shanxi Y8 aircraft crash at Iyakachchi 5 July 1992
- Flying Officer A. M. A Packeer died in Aircraft Crash on 22 January 1997
- Sergeant T. H. Sherifdeen died in Aircraft Crash on 29 April 1995

=== Sri Lanka Navy ===
- Captain TP Marso (Logistics Branch & Chairman Sri Lanka Navy Muslim Association 2016 – 2021)
- Lieutenant Amrit Singalaxana (Navy Engineering)
- Lieutenant Tuan Azwan Cader (Navy Infantry)
- Captain Tuan Zackhairoon Bagus (Deceased 3 March 2020)
- Lieutenant Commander Shanthi Bahar – a pioneer to lead a small team of specially trained sailors seeking LTTE hideouts in the jungles and thickets of Trincomalee. Killed in action.

=== Sri Lanka Police ===
==== Pre 1947 ====
- Inspector of Police (IP) B.H.Dole
- Police Constable (PC) Sabhan – The origin of annual Police Day commemoration dates back to March 21, 1864, when Constable Sabhan died of gunshot injuries received during a police raid to apprehend the notorious bandit Utuwankande Sura Saradiel.

==== Post 1947 ====
- Senior Deputy Inspector General of Police (SDIG) M.R. Latiff – 11th (1st Muslim & Malay) Commandant of the Special Task Force
- Deputy Inspector General of Police (DIG) B. M. N. Jurangpathy
- Deputy Inspector General of Police (DIG) T. M. Miskin
- Deputy Inspector General of Police (DIG) Akbar Packeer (23 August 1934 – 14 February 2009)
- Senior Superintendent of Police (SSP) Baba Ram Dole (Son of Inspector of Police B.H.Dole) – The first Muslim & Malay to reach the rank of Superintendent of Police. He joined the Police as a young Sub Inspector in the year 1934 during the British rule. He retired in the year 1972 as the Head of the Colombo Crimes Division.
- Senior Superintendent of Police (SSP) Baba Mahil Dole (Son of Chief Inspector Baba Muhajireen Dole, Grandson of Inspector of Police B.H.Dole)
- Senior Superintendent of Police (SSP) T. M. B. Mahath
- Senior Superintendent of Police (SSP) M. C. Mahamoor
- Sergeant Tuan Asikun
- Senior Superintendent of Police (SSP) – Tuan Faisal Hadji (Hadgie)
- Tuan Ahmed Harin Sourjah - Sub-Inspector(Worked for Ministry Security Dep. & Bribery & Corruption Department).

== Sports ==
=== Cricket ===
- Baba Roshan Jurangpathy (born 25 June 1967) is a Sri Lankan former Test cricketer. He played his debut Test against India in 1985 at Asgiriya Stadium.
- Tillakaratne Dilshan is a Sri Lankan former Test cricketer and captain.
- Tillakaratne Sampath is a Sri Lankan former first-class cricketer.

=== Football ===
- Muzammil Hassimdeen
- Subhani Hassimdeen
- Naheem Hassimdeen
- Farook Hassimdeen
- Thuwan Raheem (born 11 September 1979) is a Sri Lankan footballer in the Sri Lanka national football team
- Roomie Packeerally. B.R.A.Preena
- M.I Sourjah (born 1971) is a former Sri Lankan footballer who represented the Sri Lanka national football team and played club football for Java Lane Sports Club in Colombo. He served as captain of Java Lane Sports Club and was regarded as one of the club's notable players. During his playing career, Sourjah was involved in Sri Lankan domestic football and represented the country at international level. Following his playing career, he has remained associated with Sri Lankan football through his involvement in the football community.

=== Rugby Football ===
- Fazil Marija (born 2 December 1985) – Served as the Vice Captain of the Sri Lanka National Rugby Teams of 2011 and 2013

=== Swimming ===
- Ghefari Dulapanda – He captained the Sri Lankan swimming team for eight years from 1992 – 2000
- Kimiko Raheem
- Machiko Raheem
- Mayumi Raheem

== Other ==
- Yahiya ( Sri Lanka Army ) Boxer

== See also ==
- Sri Lankan Malays
- Sri Lankan Malay language
- Islam in Sri Lanka
- Sri Lankan Moors
- List of Sri Lankan Moors
- Indian Moors
- Memons in Sri Lanka
- Malayisation
- List of Sri Lankans
