= List of Sri Lankan Moors =

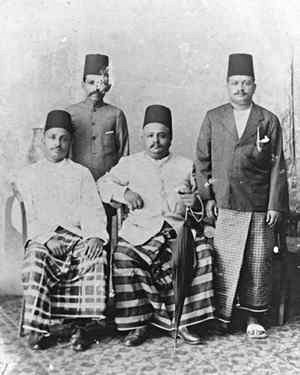
20th century Sri Lankan Moors

This is a list of Sri Lankan Muslims. Sri Lankan Moors (Tamil: இலங்கைச் சோனகர், romanized: Ilaṅkaic Cōṉakar; Sinhala: ලංකා යෝනක, romanized: Lanka Yonaka formerly Ceylon Muslims; colloquially referred to as Moors or Muslims ) are a minority ethnic group in Sri Lanka, comprising 9.3% of the country's total population. They are mainly native speakers of the Tamil language with influence of Sinhalese and Arabic words, however, some of them use Sinhalese as their native tongue. They are predominantly followers of Islam.

The Moors trace their ancestry to Arab traders who settled in Sri Lanka in waves beginning from the 8th century. The population of Moors are the highest in the Ampara, Trincomalee and Batticaloa districts.

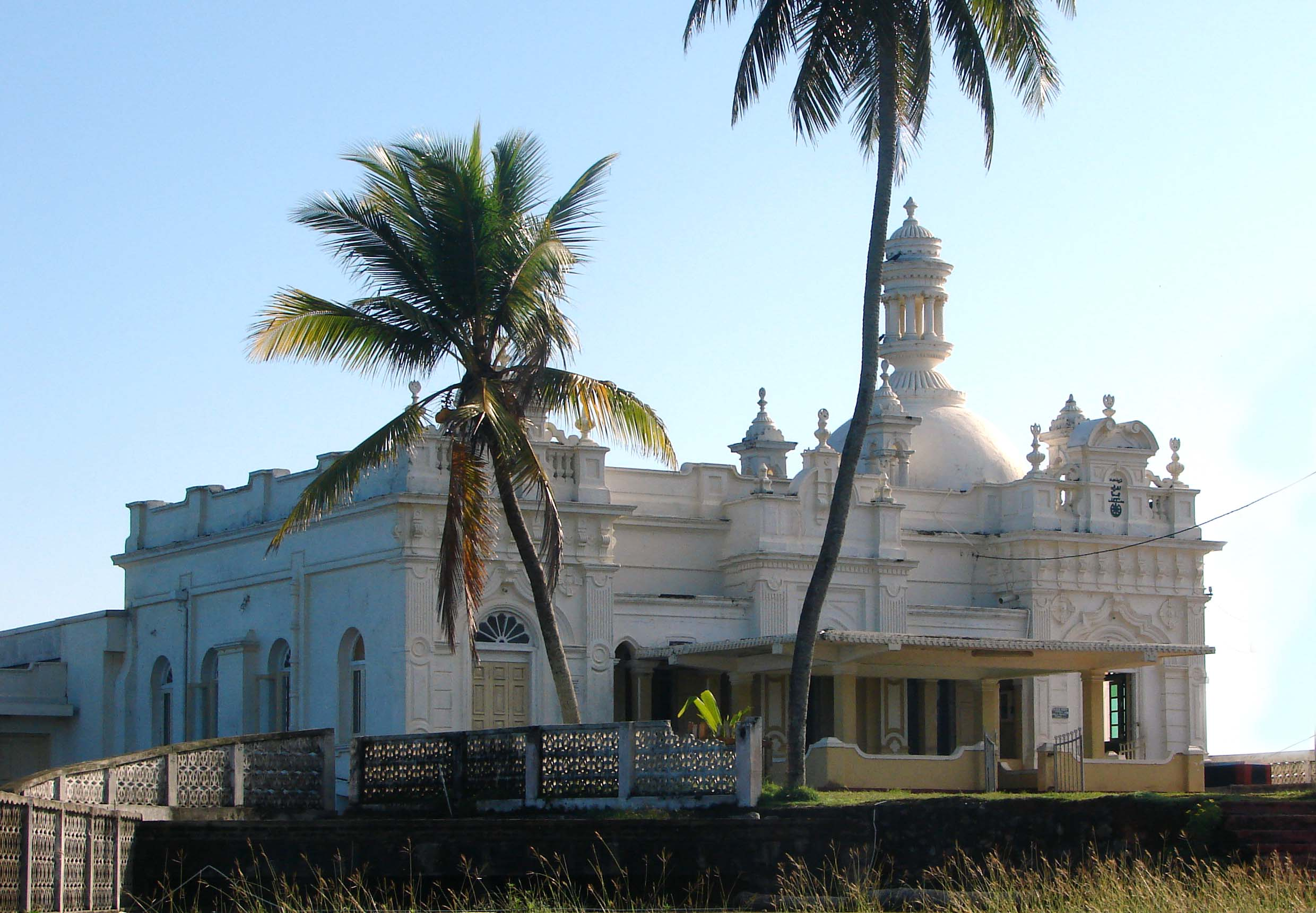
Kechimalai Mosque, Beruwala. One of the oldest mosques in Sri Lanka. It is believed to be the site where the first Arabs landed in Sri Lanka

The Portuguese named the Muslims in India and Sri Lanka after the Muslim Moors they met in Iberia. The word Moors did not exist in Sri Lanka before the arrival of the Portuguese colonists. The term 'Moor' was chosen because of the Islamic faith of these people and was not a reflection of their origin.

The Tamil term for Moors is Sonakar, which is thought to be derived from the word sunni. The Tamil term Sonakar along with the Sinhalese term Yonaka have been thought to have been derived from the term Yona, a term originally applied to Greeks, but sometimes also Arabs.

== Demographics ==
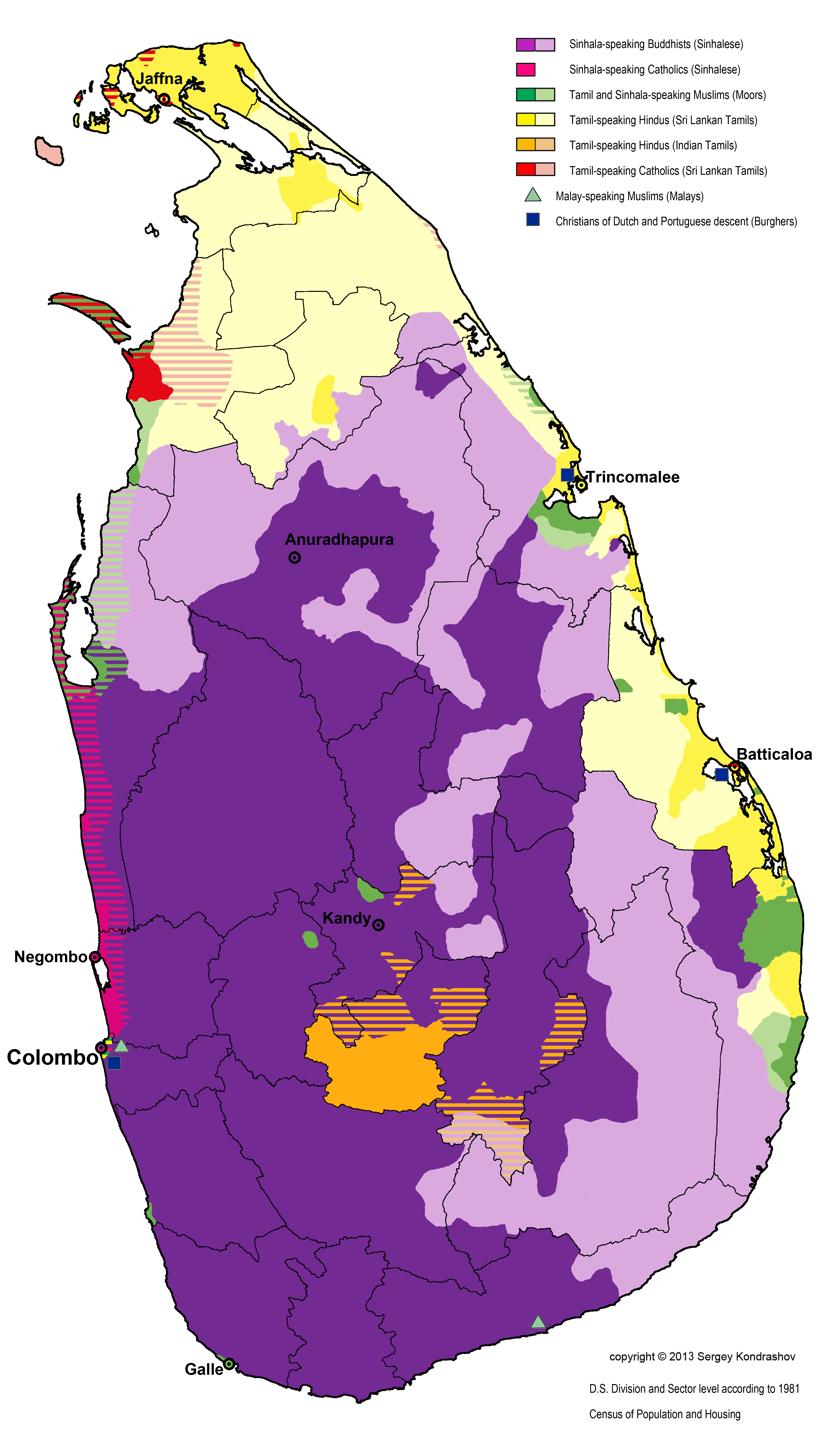
Distribution of languages and religious groups of Sri Lanka on D.S. division and sector level according to the 1981 Census of Population and Housing

Census	Population	Percentage
1881	184,500	6.69%
1891	197,200	6.56%
1901	228,000	6.39%
1911	233,900	5.70%
1921	251,900	5.60%
1931 Estimate	289,600	5.46%
1946	373,600	5.61%
1953	464,000	5.73%
1963	626,800	5.92%
1971	855,724	6.74%
1981	1,046,926	7.05%
2011	1,892,638	9.2%

== Pioneers and early accounts ==
- Yusuf bin Ahmad al-Kawneyn – Arab traveller said to have founded Beruwala
- One tradition names a Prince Jamal-ud-din, son of Sultan Alaa-uddin of Konya, Turkey, to have arrived in Beruwala in the 10th century and introduced the Unani medicine system to the island.
- Another tradition states that four vessels sailed from Yemen with three Sultans, Bad-ur-din, Salah-ud-din and Mohamed. They landed at Mannar and settled there. Sad-ur-din, the son of Mohamed, sailed further south along the West coast and settled in Beruwela.
- The earliest physical evidence to a Muslim presence in Colombo is an Arabic tombstone marking the death in 948 A.D. of a Muslim preacher named In Abu Bakasa sent by the caliph of Baghdad
- Ibn Battuta, during his 1341–1344 visit to the island, recounts a regional Muslim ruler in Colombo named Jalasthi, who is reported to have been served by a garrison of 500 Abyssinians. Ibn Battuta also recalls being entertained by a "Ship Captain Ibrahim" in Galle.
- Tradition states that during the reign of a certain "Raja Sinha", three Arabs travelled inland to Kandy. The king allowed them to take three native wives, and the three Arabs settled Akurana. Those three Arabs became the ancestors of the Moors of Akurana.

== Native headmen of Ceylon ==
The native headmen system was an integral part of the administration of the island of Ceylon (now known as Sri Lanka) under the successive European colonial powers, namely the Portuguese Empire, the Dutch East India Company and the British Empire. Native headmen or leaders were appointed by the European colonial administrators to function as intermediates between the Europeans and the native populace. During different periods through this system these headmen functioned in military, policing, administrative and ceremonial capacities. They served as translators and revenue collectors, and wielded quasi-judicial powers. Much of the system evolved and changed over time until some of the last vestiges of it were removed in the post-independent Ceylon.

With the onset of British rule, Governor North restructured the native headmen system. The system was transformed into a salaried system with land grants and tenured service abolished. They became the second tier of the civil administration of the island with appointments made by the Government Agent of the Province. Appointments were non-transferable and usually hereditary, made to locals, usually from wealthy influential families loyal the British Crown. The holder had much control over the people of the area and had limited police powers since he was responsible to keep the peace, carry out revenue collection and assist in judicial functions. Over the next century, the headmen grew to be a powerful and affluent class consolidating economic power through land ownership and marriage. Gradually functions of headmen were transferred to various departments that were established by the British administration.

Following the formation of the State Council of Ceylon in 1931, one of its members, H. W. Amarasuriya, called for an inquiry into the Native Headman System. A commission was formed made up of retired civil servants and lawyers headed by H.M. Wedderburn. The commission reported on reforming the headman system or replacing it with transferable District Revenue Officers. The Native Headman System was abolished as an administrative system, with the titles of Mudaliyar (Mudali – මුදලි) and Muhandiram retained by government to be awarded as honors. This practice remained until suspension of Celanese honors in 1956. The minor headman positions were retained, surviving well into the 1970s when the posts of Vidane (විදානේ) in Low Country / Tamil Area and Town Arachchi (ටවුන් ආරච්චි) / Gan Arachchi (ගන් ආරච්චි) in Kandyan Area were replaced with the transferable post of Grama Niladhari (Village Officer).

"Peace Officer" includes Police Officer and the Headman of an area appointed in writing to perform police duties by the Government Agent of the Province by virtue of the powers vested in him by His Excellency the Governor.

== List of prominent headmen in the low country ==
The headmen system in the coastal and low country evolved over time under the colonial administration of the Portuguese, the Dutch and then the British.

=== Head Mudaliyar Maha Mudaliyar (මහ මුදලි) ===
Head Mudaliyar was the head of the low country native headmen and native aide-de-camp to the Governor of Ceylon.

- Chief Mudaliyar Sheikh Abdul Cader Marikar Muhammad Cassim Lebbe Marikar (1805–1877) – Chief Mudaliyar Eastern Province

=== Korale Mudaliyar (Korale Mudali – කෝරලේ මුදලි) ===
Korale Mudaliyar was in charge of an area known as a Korale and had several Muhandiram's under his supervision

=== Muhandiram (මුහන්දිරම්) ===
A Muhandiram had several Vidane Arachchies under his supervision

- Haji Marikkar Muhandiram (d:1817) of Wellassa
- Galagaha Vidanalagegedara Seyed Mohamed Lebbe Marikar Madige Muhandiram (1840–1939) of Kandy
- M. K. Abdul Hameed Madige Muhandiram of Kurunegala
- Mohammed Salie Muhandiram Madige Aarachchi of Kotiyakumbura
- Ibra Lebbe Sulaiman Lebbe Muhandiram (1893–1964) of Kurikotuwa Maddeketiya Korale
- Muhandiram M. K. Mahmood Lebbe a.k.a Thalama (1910–1981) of Ibbagamuwa.

=== Vidane Arachchi (විදානේ ආරච්චි) ===
A Vidane Arachchi had several Vidanes under his supervision

- Muhammedh Thamby Samsudheen Vidane Arachchi a.k.a Dheen Arachchi (1860–1915) of Negombo – Dheen Junction in Negombo is named after him
- Ali Thambi Abbas Lebbe Vidane Arachchi of Kal-Eliya
- I. L. M. Usuph Vidane Arachchi of Hanmbantota

=== Vidane (විදානේ) ===
A village or a group of small villages placed under his administration. Vidane was a Low Country headman ranking immediately below that of a Vidane Arachchi in Low Country and below that of a Udayar in Tamil Area in the Native Headmen System. A Vidane was equivalent in ranking to the Kandyan Areas headmen Town Arachchi or a Gan Arachchi

==== Vidane ====
- Arrasi Marikkar a.k.a Sinna Thamby Vidane of Malwana
- Muhammad Hajie Marikar Vidane of Alutgama
- Maththicham Saleem Lebbe Muhammed Thamby Vidane (1819–1879) of Negombo – Udayar Thoppuwa Mosque at Dheen Junction in Negombo was built by him in 1846. This Masjid is maintained by his descendants who continue to preserve the original building.
- Avoo Lebbe Marikar Vidane (1836–1906) of Thihariya

==== Police Vidane ====
in charge of police duties in the Village under the supervision of the vidane

- Hassan Meera Lebbe Police Vidane of Kahatovita

==== Vel Vidane ====
In charge of distributing water from the wewa (tank) to villagers for cultivation under the supervision of the vidane

==== Seeni Vidane ====
In charge of distributing Sugar under the supervision of the vidane

== List of prominent headmen in Tamil areas ==
The Northern and Eastern provinces had the following classes of native headmen:

=== Atikar ===
Source:

=== Vanniyar (වන්නියා) (பண்டாரத்தார்) ===
Vanniar or Vanniyar had several Maniyagar under his supervision.

- Abdul Kareem Kariapper Vanniah of Eravur Pattu and Koralai Pattu
- Kos Mohamed Abdul Majeed Vanniah of Karaivahu https://www.worldgenweb.org/lkawgw/gen203.htm
- Abdul Latheef Kariapper Vanniah of Sammanthurai Pattu
- M. M. Abdul Majeed Vanniah of Kalmunaikudy
- Meera Lebbe Podi Vanniah of Karaivahu

=== Maniyagar ===
Maniyagar had several Udayar's under his supervision

=== Udayar ===
Udayar had several Vidane's under his supervision

- Mohamed Saleem Kariapper Udayar a.k.a Salin Udayar of Eravur

=== Vidane ===
==== Vidane ====
A village or a group of small villages placed under his administration. Vidane was a Low Country headman ranking immediately below that of a Vidane Arachchi in Low Country and below that of a Udayar in Tamil Area in the Native Headmen System. A Vidane was equivalent in ranking to the Kandyan Areas headmen Town Arachchi or a Gan Arachchi

- Mohammed Mohideen Kariapper Vidane of Karaivahu

==== Police Vidane ====
in charge of police duties in the Village under the supervision of the vidane

==== Vel Vidane ====
In charge of distributing water from the wewa (tank) to villagers for cultivation under the supervision of the vidane

==== Seeni Vidane ====
In charge of distributing Sugar under the supervision of the vidane

- Mohammed Meera Lebbe Seeni Vidane of Kalmunaikudy

== List of prominent headmen in the Kandyan areas ==
Following the Uva Rebellion in 1818 and changes to the administrative divisions of the island with the creation of Districts, British Government Agents (GA) took over the duties of the Dissava (with the remaining and newly appointed Dissavas being mere honorary titles), with Rate Mahatmaya becoming a subordinate to the local Government Agents and Assistant Government Agents. In the same way, after 1818 the position of the remaining and newly appointed Adigar (Maha Adigar or 1st Adigar) became mere honorary titles.

=== Adigar ===
An honorary appointment

=== Dissava ===
British Government Agent of the Province took over the duties of a Dissava (with the remaining and newly appointed Dissavas being mere honorary appointments) in 1818. Rate Mahatmayas under his supervision

=== Rate Mahatmaya (රටෙි මහත්තයා) ===
Rate Mahatmaya had several Korale Mahatmayas under his supervision.

=== Korale Mahaththaya (කෝරලේ මහත්තයා) ===
Korale Mahattaya was in charge of an area known as Korale and had several Gran Arachchis / Town Arachchis under his supervision.

=== Town Arachchi (ටවුන් ආරච්චි) ===
A Town Arachchi had a Town or group of small villages placed under his Administration

- Samsudeen Town Arachchi (1892–1956) of Danowita
- Unus Ibunu Muhammed Abdul Razzak Town Arachchi (1895–1972) of Nelundeniya
- Ahamed Lebbe Muhammed Junaid Town Arachchi (1914–1995) of Thulhiriya

=== Gan Arachchi (ගන් ආරච්චි) ===
A Gan Arachchi had a village or group of small villages placed under his Administration

- Meerakkandu Muhandiramala Abdul Rahiman Lebbe Gan Arachchi of Udatalawinna
- Dambagolle Vidanele Omerudeen Lebbe Gan Arachchi of Udatalawinna
- Galagaha Vidanalage Gedara Ismail Marikkar Grama Aarachchi of Mawanella
- Galagawa Vidanele Seyado Mabammado Lebbe Gan Arachchi of Madawalamadige

== List of prominent headmen Peace Officers ==
"Peace Officer" includes police officers and headmen appointed by a Government Agent in writing to perform police duties.

- Peace Officer Muhammad Ghany of Galloluwa
- Peace Officer Sidar Muhannad Ali Thamby of Kal-Eliya
- Peace Officer Iburahim Lebbe of Illawatura
- Peace Officer Ahamadu Lebbe Mohammadu Lebbe Markan of Kadiyawatta
- Peace Officer Khalid Ahamed Unus Ibunu (1845–1905) of Nelundeniya
- Peace Officer Unus Ibunu Muhammed Ismail (1873–1918) of Warakapola
- Peace Officer Ali of Polgahawela

== List of prominent head Moorman ==
=== Head Moorman appointments made prior to 1824 ===
- Dr. Oduma Lebbe Marikar Sheikh Abdul Cader Marikar alias Shaikady Marikar (1772–1847) – Head Moorman of Colombo
- Cader Shahib Marikar – Kariapper, or Head Moorman over the Temple at Welasse
- Neina Marikar, – Head Marikar of the Moormen in the jurisdiction of Tricomalie
- Cader Sahib Marikar – Head Moorman under the collector of Galle
- Slema Lebbe Samsy Lebbe – Head Moomen of Gindura
- Sekadi Marikar Sekadi Lebbe Marikar – Head Moomman of Matara
- Kasi Lebbe Sinne Lebbe Marikar – Head Moorman of Weligama
- Omer Marikar Sego Lebbe Marikar – Head Moorman under the Collectors of Chilaw
- Neina Lebbe Bawa Marikar – Head Moorman of Puttalam
- Sinna Tamby – Head Moorman of Kalpentyn (Presently called Kalpitiya)

=== Head Moorman appointments made after 1824 ===
- Muhammad Lebbe Siddi Lebbe – Head Moorman of Kandy. Appointed in 1833

== Awarded as an honor (titular) ==
=== List of orominent Gate Mudaliyar ===
- Gate Mudaliyar Casie Lebbe Maestriyar Oduma Lebbe of Kandy
- Gate Mudaliyar Ahamath Ibrahim Jainu-Deen (1864–1924) of Badulla
- Gate Aboobucker Mudaliyar of Galle
- Gate Mudaliyar Muhammad Ismail Abdul Rahman of Colombo

=== List of prominent Moor Gate Arachchi ===
- Pawalkodi Ismail Lebbe Marikar Mathicham Muhammad Abdullah Headman, Titular Arachchi of Matara

== Leading businesspersons ==
=== During British Ceylon ===
==== 1815–1832 ====
- Oduma Lebbe Marikar Ahmed Lebbe Marikar Alim (OLMALM Alim) d. 1917 – He established O.L.M.A.L.M. Alim & Sons (Import of hardware & household items) in 1820 at 3rd Cross Street, Colombo 11. He was one of the wealthy among the Ceylon Moors in Colombo. He did extensive hardware business and was possessed of several immovable properties. He had several sons who managed each department of his businesses. He died in 1917 and his estate was valued at approximately two million rupees.

==== 1833–1930 ====
- Idroos Lebbe Marikar Noordeen Hajiar – He established I.L.M. Noordeen Hajiar & Company (Import of iron, steel, metal, hardware, small arms, ammunition & electrical good) in 1840 at 236 Main Street, Colombo 11
- S.M. Assena Marikar – He established S.M. Assena Marikar & Company (Import of hardware & household items) in 1840 at 6 &14 China Street, Colombo 11.
- Yusuf Lebbe Idroos Lebbe Marikar Hajiar – He was General Merchant and Landed Proprietor. He was the Trustee of the Grand Mosque and had donated a valuable property in Pettah for the Mosque.
- Arasi Marikar Wapchie Marikar (1829–1925) – His name will be long remembered as the builder of the General Post Office in Colombo, the Colombo Museum, Colombo Customs, Old Town Hall in Pettah, the Galle Face Hotel, Victoria Arcade, Finlay Moir building, the Clock Tower, Batternburg Battery etc. In January 1877, the completed building of the Colombo Museum was declared open by His Excellency, Governor Gregory, in the presence of a large crowd, amongst which there were many Muslims present. At the end of the ceremony His Excellency asked Arasi Marikar Wapchi Marikar what honour he wished to have for his dedication. The same question was asked by His Excellency from the carpenter who assisted Wapchi Marikar with the wood work of the Museum who desired a local Rank and was honoured accordingly. Wapchi Marikar, noticing the large number of Muslims present, feared that they would spend their time at the Museum on Friday during the Islamic congregation prayer, and requested that the Museum be closed on Fridays. This request has been adhered to by all authorities in charge of the Museum to this day.
- M.C. Joonoos – He established M.C. Joonoos & Company (Export of Jewelry & Gems) in 1855 at 12 Grand Orient Hotel, Colombo 01
- O.L.M. Macan-Markar (d. 1901) – He established O.L.M. Macan-Markar & Company (Export of Jewellery & Gems) in 1860 at Grand Orient Hotel, Galle Face Hotel, Hotel Taprobane, Galle Face Courts Colombo 03
- Cassim Lebbe Marikkar Bawa – He Established C.L. Marikar Bawa & Sons (Import of Diamonds & Silk, Export of Jewelry & Gems) in 1869 at 90 Chatham Street, Colombo 01. Bawa Place in Colombo 08 is named after him
- Ismail Lebbe Marikar Muhammad Cassim – He established Abdul Rahims (Import of household items, hardware, furniture & electrical goods) in 1872 in the name of his eldest son Muhammad Cassim Abdul Rahim
- Assen Ali Muhammad Nagoor Meera – He established AM Nagoor Meera & Company in 1886 at Gas Works Street, Colombo 11. He died in 1923 and left behind an estate valued at 21 million Rupees, a vast and unbelievable fortune at that time
- A.H. Hamid – He established A.H. Hamid & Company (Import of Diamonds, Export of Pearls, Jewelry & Gems) in 1886 at 9/10 Bristol Building, Colombo 01
- Abdul Latife – He established Abdul Latife & Company (Import of household items) in 1887 at 23/25 3rd Cross Street, Colombo 11
- Sulaiman Lebbe Naina Marikar Hajiar (1868–1926) – He established S.L. Naina-Marikar & Company [Import of textiles & automobiles (1920)] at 188 Keyzer Street, Colombo 11
- Noordeen Hajiar Abdul Gaffoor Hajiar (1875–1948) – He established N. D. H. Abdul Gaffoor & Sons (Export of Gems, Pearls, & Jewelry, Import of Diamonds) in 1895 at Gaffoor Building, Bristol Street, Colombo. He had special permission to board the ships that called at the Colombo harbour and sell his gems and jewellery to the sailors. By special command, Abdul Gaffoor was allowed the privilege of exhibiting pearls, diamonds, rubies and sapphires and art works to the Prince and Princess of Wales at the Kandy Pavilion, during their Royal visit in 1901. His stall was given a prominent place at the Wembley Exhibition in 1924 and Her Majesty Queen Mary personally visited his pavilion and made purchases. It was by sheer merit that he achieved success. In 1932, he established a Muslim Theological Institute, known as the Ghaffooria Arabic College, for the study of Arabic, at Maharagama. Abdul Caffoor Mawatha in Colombo 03 is named after him
- Wapu Marikar Hassim JP (1880–1960) – He attended Wesley College, Colombo, and was preparing to appear for the Notary's examination when his elders recommended that he take up to trade and business. He established W. M. Hassim & Sons (Import of hardware & household items) in 1906, at No. 77, Main Street, Colombo 11. His charity knew no bounds for both Muslim and non-Muslim causes. The state, acknowledging his philanthropy and educational activity, honoured him with the title of Justice of the Peace on the occasion of the 25th Anniversary of the accession to the throne of His majesty King George V
- Levana Marikar Uvais Hajiar – He established Mackie Stores in 1921 at 256 Main Street Colombo 11
- Teruwa Neginde Marikar Devoe Neyandi Marikar – Trader and Tamil Speaking Jury from Kotuwegoda, Matara as per The Ceylon Government of No. 5,207 dated March 10, 1893. He was known to have owned at least 84 businesses in and around Matara. Owner of many acres of land in Matara, Galle and Hambantota districts. Kammala Watta and many other properties in Old Tangalle Road are still unclaimed by his family. The land of Majmathul Khairath Takkiya in St Servatius Road, Matara was donated by his family. The real extent of his wealth is unknown to his family members until today.

==== 1931–1947 ====
- A.M.M Rajabdeen - He established A.M.M Rajabdeen & Sons in 1935 (Importers of Sanitaryware, Ceramic, Bathroom Fittings & Accessories, Tiles, P.V.C, Pipes and Hardware) in 1960 at 125 Messenger Street Colombo 12, Rajabdeen & Sons Currently it is run by their grandson ( or Great Grandson) Adnan Rajabdeen and is located at 192 Nawala Road, Narahenpita, Colombo 05
- S. M. M. Hussain (1916–1991) – He established The Colombo Picture Palace (picture framing and sheet glass) in 1942

=== During Dominion of Ceylon ===
==== 1948–1971 ====
- M.I.M. Mohideen– He established M.I.M. Mohideen & Company (Importersof Sanitaryware, Ceramic, Bathroom Fittings & Accessories, Tiles, P.V.C, Pipes and Hardware) in 1960 at 110, 114 Messenger Street Colombo 12
- A.W.M. Makeen Hajiar (1933–2014) – He established Macksons Holdings (parent Company of Multilac Paints) in 1970
- M.L.M Naeem Hajiar – He established Ali Brothers in 1970

=== During Republic of Sri Lanka ===
==== 1972–1977 ====
- Mohamed Ismail Mohamed Naleem Hajiar (1932–2006) – Gem Merchant, Founder of Bairaha Group in 1975.
- Mohamed Haniffa Abdul Razzak Hajiar- He established Asian Hardware in 1975, current head office at No.144, Messenger Street, Colombo 12
- Zainul Abdeen Marikar Mohamed Refai Hajiar – He established Zam Gems in 1976

==== 1978 to present ====
- N.L.M. Mubarack – He established the leading fashion retail chain French Corner in 1992 which was rebranded in 2005 as NOLIMIT
- Rizwi Thahar – He established the leading fashion retail chain Cool Planet in 2006

== Politicians ==
=== During British Ceylon ===
==== Legislative Council of Ceylon (1833–1931) ====
- Muhammad Cassim Abdul Rahman (1829–1899) – He was nominated to a seat in the Colombo Municipal Council in 1876 to look after and promote the interest of the local Ceylon Moors (Muslims). He made such an impressive mark, that, while a Counsellor he was also appointed as an unofficial Municipal Magistrate. The Moors of Ceylon of the time, incoherent though, yet made calls for representation in the Legislative Council to which Abdul Rahman was appointed on October 29, 1889, as the first Mohammedan member, by Governor Gordon. His indispensability received such recognition, that, at the end of his five-year term, he was re-appointed for a further five years by Governor Havelock. However, he did not live long enough to fulfil that extended term.
- Wapchie Marikar Abdul Rahman (1868–1933) – He was nominated to the Legislative Council as the Muslim member in 1900
- Proctor Noordeen Hajiar Muhammad Abdul Cader (1879–1938) – He was one of the leading proctors of the day. He succeeded W.M.Abdul Rahman as the Muslim Member of the Legislative Council in 1915 and represented the Muslims in the Legislative Council for fifteen years.

==== State Council of Ceylon (1931–1947) ====
- Sir Mohamed Macan Markar (7 September 1877 – 10 May 1952) was a Sri Lankan, prominent colonial era legislator and businessmen. He was Minister of Home Affaires of the State Council, member of the Legislative Council and Senator
- Sir Razik Fareed OBE, JP, UM (29 December 1893 – 23 August 1984), was a Ceylonese (Sri Lankan) landed proprietor, politician, diplomat and philanthropist. He was the former Cabinet Minister of Trade, Senator, member of parliament and the state council. He had also served as Ceylon's High Commissioner to Pakistan.

=== During Dominion of Ceylon ===
==== House of Representatives (Ceylon) (1947–1972) ====
- Proctor Hameed Hussain Sheikh Ismail (19 May 1901 – 3 August 1974) – He was the 5th (First Muslim) Speaker of the Parliament of Sri Lanka (19 April 1956 – 5 December 1959). and first elected Member of Parliament in the first general election held for the Parliament of Independent Ceylon in 1947. Founder of Ceylon Baithul Mal Fund
- Mudaliyar Ahamedlebbe Sinnalebbe (b 1902) – At the time of gaining political freedom the question of the national flag became an issue among the political leaders of the day. On Friday January 16, 1948 when the parliament met after lunch A. Sinnalebbe (Batticaloa) rose in parliament and moved, "That this house is of opinion that the Royal Standards of King Sri Wickrama Raja Sinha depicting a yellow lion passant holding a sword in its right paw on a red background, which was removed to England after the Convention of 1815, should once again be adopted as the official flag of free Lanka."
- Gate Mudaliyar M. S. Kariapper (1899– 1989) – He was a Sri Lankan politician and Member of Parliament. He was elected to Parliament at the 1947 parliamentary election to represent Kalmunai, as a United National Party candidate. In the 1956 general election, Kariapper was elected on Federal Party ticket, and within six months deserted Federal Party.
- C.A.S. Marikkar (5 July 1911 –18 Nov 1970 ) founder member of SLFP. Minister for Post, Broadcasting and Communication during the 1956 cabinet. Member of Parliament from 1952 to 1960.
- Proctor M. M. Musthapa (1924–2000) – Minister of Fiancé from 22 November 1959 to 5 December 1959 A son in law of M.S. Kariapper; in 1956 general election, he was elected on Federal Party ticket, and like his father in law, deserted Federal Party.
- Proctor I. A. Cader (1917–1979) – Ibrahim Adaham Abdul Cader, known as I. A. Cader was the Deputy Speaker of the Parliament of Sri Lanka (22 May 1970 – 18 May 1977)

=== During Republic of Sri Lanka ===
==== National State Assembly of Sri Lanka (1972–1978) ====
- Dr Badi-ud-din Mahmud (23 June 1904 – 16 June 1997) – He was a Sri Lankan politician. He served 10 years [(23 July 1960 – 28 May 1963) and (31 May 1970 – 23 July 1977)] as Minister of Education and also held the office of Minister of Health and Housing.

==== Parliament of Sri Lanka (1978–present) ====
- Deshamanya Mohammed Abdul Bakeer Markar – (12 May 1917 – 10 September 1997) was a Sri Lankan politician. He was the 12th (second Muslim) Speaker of the Parliament of Sri Lanka (21 September 1978 – 30 August 1983) and Governor of the Southern Province.
- A. C. S. Hameed (10 April 1927 – 3 September 1999) – He served as Minister of Foreign Affairs of Sri Lanka from 1977 to 1989; and from 1993 to 1994. In the intervening period he was Minister of Justice & Higher Education of Sri Lanka.
- M. H. Mohamed (15 June 1921 – 26 April 2016) – was a Sri Lankan politician. Mohamed served as the 14th (Third Muslim) Speaker of the Parliament of Sri Lanka (9 March 1989 – 24 June 1994) as well as being a former member of Parliament and government minister. Mohamed was the first Muslim and Sri Lankan Moor to hold office as Mayor of Colombo
- M. H. M. Naina Marikar – He was the minister of Finance from 10 January 1988 to 3 January 1989
- Imthiaz Bakeer Markar – is a Sri Lankan politician. He is the current Chairman of the National Media Centre and former Cabinet Minister of Media, Postal and Telecommunications from 2001 to 2004 and State Minister of Housing from 1989 to 1993. He was also a member of the parliament from the Kalutara District from 1989 to 2004. Bakeer Markar is a former Vice President of the United National Party (UNP).
- M. H. M. Ashraff – Leader of the Sri Lanka Muslim Congress (SLMC), Minister of Ports Development and Eastern Rehabilitation and Reconstruction
- Rauff Hakeem – Leader of the Sri Lanka Muslim Congress (SLMC), Minister of Justice
- Rishad Bathiudeen – Leader of the All Ceylon Makkal Congress (ACMC), Minister of Resettlement & Disaster Relief Services
- Ali Sabry – is a Sri Lankan lawyer and a National list M.P of the SLPP party in 2020 parliamentary election.He is the current Foreign Minister (2022–Present) and He previously served as the Minister of Finance (2022) and Minister of Justice (2020–2022).

== Diplomats ==
=== Career diplomats ===
- Izzeth Hussain – He was the first ever Muslim to join the Ceylon Overseas Service and the first ever Muslim career diplomat to rise to the highest position in the Foreign Service by holding the position of Director General of Foreign Relations in the Ministry of Foreign Affairs in the 1980s. He was also the Ambassador to the Russian Federation and the Commonwealth of Independent States, based in Moscow.
- A.M.J. Sadiq – Sri Lankan Ambassador to The Kingdom of Netherlands

== Civil servants ==
- A. M. A. Azeez – first Moor civil servant; former GA of Eastern Province (present Amparai); late Zahira College (Colombo) Principal
- Deshamanya Dr. A. M. M. Sahabdeen – Ceylon Civil Service, Founder of the A.M.M. Sahabdeen Foundation, Former Chairman of Sifani Group of Companies, Former Director of National Savings Bank, Visiting Head of Department of Western Philosophy at the Vidyodaya University

== Judges ==
- Justice Izadean Mohamed Ismail – He was the 127th [1st Moor (2nd Muslim)] Justices of the Supreme Court of Sri Lanka. He was appointed on 1 January 1974 and held the office until 18 December 1981
- Justice Abdul Cader – He was the 141st [2nd Moor (3rd Muslim)] Justices of the Supreme Court of Sri Lanka. He was appointed on 8 December 1982 and held the office until 28 May 1985
- Justice M. Jameel – Supreme Court
- Justice Ameer Ismail – He was appointed as a Justices of the Supreme Court in 1999 and held the office until 2002
- Justice Saleem Marsoof PC – He was appointed as a Justices of the Supreme Court in 2005 and held the office until 2014
- Justice S. I. Imam – He was appointed as a Justices of the Supreme Court on 9 January 2009 and held the office until 20 February 2013
- M. T. Mohammed Laffar – Judge and the Acting President of the Court of Appeal of Sri Lanka
- Ahsan Marikar – Judge of the Court of Appeal of Sri Lanka

== Lawyers ==
- Proctor Muhammad Cassim Siddi Lebbe (1838–1898) – First Muslim Lawyer in Sri Lanka, and National Hero.
- Advocate Abdul Caffoor Mohamad Ameer QC – He was the 32nd (First Muslim) Attorney General of Ceylon. He was appointed in 1966 and held the office until 1970.
- Advocate Shibly Aziz PC – He was the 35th [1st Moor (2nd Muslim)] Solicitor General of Sri Lanka appointed in 1992 and held the office until 1992. He was the 37th (Second Muslim) Attorney General of Ceylon appointed in 1995 and held the office until 1996. President of the Bar Association of Sri Lanka

== Physicians ==
=== Allopathic medicine ===
- Dr Colenda Marikar Muhammad Zubair – First Muslim to qualify as a Doctor
- Dr S.M Jabir – Second Muslim to qualify as a Doctor
- Deshamanya Dr M. C. M. Kaleel (3 February 1900 – 19 October 1994) – He was a Ceylonese physician (Third Muslim to qualify as a Doctor), social worker and politician.
- Dr A.C.M. Sulaiman – Founder of The Grandpass Maternity & Nursing Home (Sulaiman's Hospital) in 1942
- Deshamanya Professor A. H. Sheriffdeen – A Sri Lankan surgeon, academic and voluntary worker. He is best known for introducing Vascular Surgery and also for establishing Transplant Surgery in Sri Lanka in partnership with Professor Rezvi Sheriff
- Vidya Jyothi Professor Rezvi Sheriff – FRCP (Lon), FRCP (Edin), FRACP, FCCP, FSLCGP, FNASSL is a Sri Lankan academic and physician. He is the Director of the Postgraduate Institute of Medicine; Senior Professor of Medicine; Head of the Department of Clinical Medicine at the Faculty of Medicine, University of Colombo. He is widely regarded as the Father of Nephrology or either hailed as Father of Modern Nephrology and Dialysis in Sri Lanka as he masterminded and pioneered kidney transplantation in Sri Lanka

=== Ayurveda medicine ===
- Dr. M. M. Abdul Azeez – Orthopedic Physician

=== Homeopathy medicine ===
- Dr. M. Abdul Latif

=== Unani medicine ===
- Dr. A. L. M. M. Hameem

== Engineers ==
=== Civil engineer ===
- S. Mufees R. Rafeek – Head of Projects Airport & Aviation Services (Sri Lanka) Ltd

=== Electrical engineer ===
- Mohamed Idroos Aziez
- S. A. C. M. Zubair

=== Electronic and telecommunication engineering ===
- Dr. Mohamed Fazil Mohamed Firdhous – Senior Lecturer in Information Technology at the University of Moratuwa, Sri Lanka.

== Accountants ==
- Alavi Ibrahim Macan-Markar (1919–1998) – Founder of A I Macan Markar & Co (Chartered Accountants). A I Macan Markar & Co (AIMM) was founded in 1946
- Abdul Rahman Muhammed Hathy (d:8 Oct 2002) – Senior Partner – BDO Burah Hathy and Co (Chartered Accountants). Burah Hathy & Co, was established in 1958
- S. M. Sabry (1940–2008) – The 35th (First Muslim) Auditor General of Sri Lanka. He was appointed on 26 January 1993 and held the office until 13 August 2000.
- Reyaz Mihular – He is the Managing Partner of KPMG in Sri Lanka and is a board member of KPMG's Middle East & South Asia (MESA) Regional Cluster

== Other professionals ==
- Rushdi Jabir (1977) – Motivational Speaker, educated at Prince of Wales College and University of Southern Queensland (MBA). As a Muslim, he has spoken/motivated the highest number of military staff (Army, Navy, Air Force, STF and Police) in Sri Lanka.

== Military ==
=== Sri Lanka Army ===
- Major General M. G. Muthalib USP – Commanding officer, Sri Lanka Electrical and Mechanical Engineers
- Brigadier Azad Izadeen - Director Rehabilitation
- Major Farook Fikri (d 1997) – Muhammed Farook Muhammed Fikiri was killed in Action in Nineteen Ninety Seven (1997).
- Major Usham Subair – Research Officer – Sri Lanka Army.

=== Sri Lanka Air Force ===
- Flying Officer M. J. M. Aathque died in Aircraft Crash on 26 June 1998

=== Sri Lanka Navy ===
- Captain Akram Alavi – Navy Media Spokes Person
- Commander A.S Fazal Mohamed - Former Training Commander of the Trincomalee Naval Academy

== Police ==
=== Sri Lanka Police ===
- Deputy Inspector General of Police (DIG) A. C. Abdul Gafoor
- Deputy Inspector General of Police (DIG) M.S.M Nizam

== Sports ==
=== Cricket ===
- Mohamed Abdal Hassain " Abu Fuard " (6 December 1936 – 28 July 2012) was a Sri Lankan cricketer who played first-class cricket for Ceylon from 1957 to 1970 and served for many years as a national cricket administrator
- Farveez Maharoof – Sri Lankan cricketer, in the 2004 World Cup in which he captained the Sri Lankan under 19 team
- Naveed Nawaz – Sri Lankan Test and ODI cricketer, former Sri Lanka 'A team captain and coach of Bangladesh Under-19 cricket team that won the 2020 Cricket World Cup.
- Jehan Mubarak – Sri Lankan Test and ODI cricketer.

=== Rugby football ===
- Inthisham Marikar – The former Trinity rugby ‘Lion’ led the 1996 double champions Kandy outfit. He represented the national sevens and fifteens teams from 1987 to 1992, and later again in 1996 and 1997. He led the national sevens team tour to Italy. Earlier in his career he led the Under-24 team in 1990 when they toured Hong Kong. He took up coaching in 2000 and has been accredited as level 3 coach by the World Rugby in 2018 becoming only the second Sri Lankan to receive that certificate
- Haris Omar – He led Trinity College Kandy in 1995, he also had the privilege of captaining the Sri Lanka Under 19 and Under 21 rugby teams. He led the Kandy Sports Club in 1999, and became the youngest captain. It was the first time that a father and son captained Kandy SC. (Isphan captained in 1975 and the son after 24 years)

=== Snooker ===
- Muhammad Junaid Muhammad Lafir (27 May 1930 – 26 April 1981) was a former World Champion snooker player from Sri Lanka. Lafir became the world champion in billiards in December 1973 World Amateur Billiards Championship by defeating Satish Mohan of India in the finals held in Mumbai. Lafir became the first Sri Lankan to win a billiards world championship. This was also the first time that a Sri Lankan has won a world championship title in any form of sports competition.

== Artists ==
- Mohideen Baig – popular Sri Lankan musician
- Aslam Marikar – Stage Writer and Director. Founder of the Sri Theatre Company.
- Hussain S.Mohamed – First conductor of the Symphony Orchestra of Sri Lanka with its first concert on 13 September 1958, and the repertoire Geminiani's Second Concerto Grosso, Haydn's Symphony no. 92 "Oxford" and Beethoven's Fourth Piano Concerto with Malinee Jayasinghe-Peris as soloist.
- Sajjad Hassan – Sri Lankan pop singer. Starting as a child Artiste in 1999 he entered the mainstream music industry in 2007 as an adult artist

== See also ==
- Islam in Sri Lanka
- Sri Lankan Moors
- Sri Lankan Malays
- List of Sri Lankan Malays
- Indian Moors
- Memons in Sri Lanka
