= Sri Lanka Malay =

Sri Lanka Malay may refer to:

- Sri Lankan Malays, Sri Lankans with ancestry from the Indonesia, Malaysia, or Singapore
- Sri Lanka Malay language
