= Chandrasiri Kodithuwakku =

Sri Lankan actor (1949–2016)

Chandrasiri Kodithuwakku චන්ද්‍රසිරි කොඩිතුවක්කු
- Born: Kodithuwakku Arachchige Chandrasiri; 27 December 1949; Kelaniya, Sri Lanka
- Died: 15 January 2016 (aged 66); Gampaha Base Hospital, Gampaha
- Other names: Abilin
- Education: Sambodhi College, Kelaniya
- Occupations: Actor, dramatist
- Years active: 1969–2016

Kodithuwakku Arachchige Chandrasiri (born 27 December 1949 – died 15 January 2016 as චන්ද්‍රසිරි කොඩිතුවක්කු) [Sinhala]), popularly known as Chandrasiri Kodithuwakku, was an actor in Sri Lankan cinema, stage drama and television. He played "Abilin" in the television serial Kopi Kade.

== Personal life ==
He was born on 27 December 1949 in Pethiyagoda, Kelaniya. He was educated at Sambodhi College, Kelaniya. Before entering drama, he went to work in a chili powder mill.

He was married to Daya Stella Kodituwakku and the couple has two sons, Janaka.

Kodithuwakku had been treated for kidney and breathing related illnesses for a long period of time. In 2016, he was admitted to Gampaha Base Hospital due to respiratory and cardiovascular problems. He died on 15 January 2016 at 7:20 SLST, while receiving treatment in the ICU. His remains were kept at his residence at No. 2, Meegahawatte, Delgoda. The funeral took place on 17 January 2016 at Gonahena Public Cemetery.

== Career ==
After finishing school times, he wished to join the theater school conducted by Dhamma Jagoda. However, due to economic hardship, he could not join the theater school. In the meantime, he followed an acting course at the German Cultural Institute. He then participated in the short drama festival conducted by "Moratuwa Nawa Magaka Yanno". His short drama won the awards for best script and best make up.

He made his acting debut in 1969 with the stage drama Sokkano Rajano produced by Sathischandra Edirisinghe. Then he acted in many stage plays such as Kekille, Deshapaluwa, Manape, Bedde Goranaduwa, Baka Thapas, Devlo Doni and Uthure Rahula. In 1973, he accompany by Jayasekara Aponsu and Ranjith Perera started miming art.

In 1981, Kodithuwakku studied acting under the supervision of Thevis Guruge. Then he was selected to the television serial Kopi Kade by Guruge. His role as "Abilin" became highly popularized among the public and he was usually known by his character name rather than real name. He appeared in the series from the beginning which first aired on 1 April 1987. He continued to act in the series for 30 consecutive years. Due to his character as a village gossiper, named "Abilin" he was nickname for those who speak gossip in Sri Lanka.

He was also a B-Grade singer at Sri Lanka Broadcasting Corporation. He sang duet songs with fellow actresses Susila Kuragama such as Lanka Lanka, Oba Dakkoth Hari, Lassana Sande and Esuru Kala Kalaye.

He made his maiden cinematic appearance in the 1973 film Hondata Hondai directed by J. Selvarathnam. Since then, he acted a few minor roles in cinema.

== Filmography ==
Year	Film	Role	Ref.
1973	Hondata Hondai		
1977	Sudu Paraviyo		
1978	Selinage Walawwa	Evicted resident	
1984	Kekille Rajjuruwo	Puwak Badilla	
1993	Juriya Mamai		
1995	Edath Chandiya Adath Chandiya	Neighbour	
1996	Naralowa Holman	Mortuary casket purchaser	
1996	Hitha Hondanam Waradin Na		
1999	Seetha Samire		
2001	Oba Magema Wewa		
2009	Leader		
