= Srilal Abeykoon =

Sri Lankan actor and singer (1953–2020)

Srilal Abeykoon ශ්‍රීලාල් අබේකෝන්
- Born: Tissa Srilal Abeykoon; December 31, 1953; Rajagiriya, Sri Lanka
- Died: April 16, 2020 (aged 66); Mirigama
- Other names: Appuwa
- Education: Diyawanna Vidyalaya; Hewavitharana Vidyalaya; Walisingha Harischandra College, Anuradhapura
- Occupations: Actor, singer
- Years active: 1978–2020
- Spouse: Dominica Wasana Meethani Wijenayake
- Children: 2

Tissa Srilal Abeykoon (31 December 1953 – 16 April 2020 as ශ්‍රීලාල් අබේකෝන්) [Sinhala]), was an actor in Sri Lankan cinema, theater and television. One of the most popular television actors in Sri Lanka, he is most known for the role "Appuwa" in the television serial Kopi Kade. A talented singer, Abeykoon is the only Sri Lankan singer to sing 500 songs for cassette after singer Nihal Nelson.

== Personal life ==
He was born on 31 December 1953. Born in Rajagiriya, he was educated at Diyawanna Vidyalaya and Hewavitharana Vidyalaya. He was also educated at Walisingha Harischandra Maha Vidyalaya, Anuradhapura.

He was married to Dominica Wasana Meethani Wijenayake and the couple has two children. He lived in Bothale area in Ambepussa before his death.

Abeykoon had been ill for nearly five years and received treatment at Mirigama and Ragama hospitals. He who had been receiving treatment at the Ragama General Hospital for five days, ad returned to his home at Tawalampitiya, Mirigama on 13 June. He was admitted to the Meerigama Hospital on 15 April where he died on next day 16th at the age of 66. The funeral took place on Saturday 17 April 2020 at the Malwatta cemetery in Nittambuwa.

== Career ==
Abeykoon was in charge of theatrical costumes of the Tower Hall Theater Foundation at the beginning of his career. Later he performed on many stage dramas such as Sri Wickrama, Athula V. Samaraweera's plays Sooty Gamrala and Raigam Banda before entering television serials.

In 1981, Abeykoon was cast on the television serial Kopi Kade by Thevis Guruge. His role as "Appuwa" became highly popularized among the public and he was usually known by his character name rather than real name. He appeared in the series from the beginning; it first aired on 1 April 1987. He continued to act in the series for more than 30 consecutive years even with illness.

He was a Noorthi singer of the Sri Lanka Broadcasting Corporation. He also released many music cassettes in the mid-1990s. He sang his popular songs for the drama Suuti Gamarala which include, Daskam Vismithai, Maa Premige, Mage Bhaari Obai and Sith Santhoosen. He played a prominent role in outdoor musical shows island wide during the 1980s and 1990s.

During that time, he also released cassettes with popular bands around the country including Sunflower. His cassette titled Raja Kolam consists of 10 songs. His next cassette Appuwa 2, contained 12 songs. Abeykoon sang the song "Kopi Kade Appu, Mama Wen Na Kulappu", which became highly popularized in musical shows.

He made his maiden cinematic appearance in the 1994 film Sanda Madala, directed by Malini Fonseka. He had a few other few minor acting roles in cinema.

== Filmography ==
Year	Film	Role	Ref.
1994	Sanda Madala	Kiri Banda 'Kira'	
1995	Chandiyage Putha	Boarder	
1995	Edath Chandiya Adath Chandiya	Neighbour	
1996	Mana Mohini	Rajiv's friend	
1996	Mal Hathai		
1997	Puthuni Mata Wasana		
1999	Ayadimi Sama	Tikiri Banda	
2002	Sansara Prarthana		
2017	Sellam Nethnam Lellam		
