= Ceylon Malay Youth League =

The Ceylon Malay Youth League was a Malay youth organization in Ceylon (present-day Sri Lanka). The organization was founded in 1957, and was active for about 15 years. Kartini Mohamed, the daughter of M.P. Drahaman, served as the president of the Ceylon Malay Youth League. The organization published the journal Suara Pemuda Malay ('Voice of Malay Youth').
