= Kopi Kade =

Sri Lankan comedy-drama television series

- Created by: Thevis Guruge; Andrew Jayamanne
- Directed by: Janaka Mahalpath
- Opening theme: Chandana Welikala
- Country of origin: Sri Lanka
- Original language: Sinhala
- No. of episodes: 2,150

Production
- Running time: 30 minutes

Original release
- Network: ITN
- Release: 1 April 1987 – present

Kopi Kade (Coffee Shop) (Sinhala:කෝපි කඩේ) is a Sri Lankan comedy-drama television series broadcast on the Independent Television Network. Kopi Kade is the most popular program at its time-slot, according to Survey Research Lanka. The 2,000th uninterrupted weekly episode was broadcast on October 20, 2024.

== Plot ==
ITN director Thevis Guruge developed the program as a platform to discuss social issues and convey them to the general public. The series would revolve around a village "kopi kade," because small shops that serve coffee, food and groceries generally serve as the center of town life. Women frequent such establishments to obtain the groceries they need, and men join to play games like draughts while discussing matters of interest.

== Cast and characters ==
=== Current ===
- Rathna Sumanapala as Kopi Kade Hamine
- Rathna Lalani Jayakody as Sunimal wife
- K.D. Siripala as Dingi Mahaththaya
- Geetha Bulathsinghala as Geetha Naga
- Upasena Subasinghe as Pala
- Jayarathna Rupasinghe as Sirisena
- Saman Gunawardena as Banda
- Sena Gunawardana as Kiri Hoda
- Upali Silva as Sugathan
- Wasantha Kumarasiri as Sunimal
- Ariyasena Handuwela as Village Officer
- Niluka Rekhani as Kamala
- Roopa Gomes as Gramasevaka hamine
- Shamadara Ariyawansha as doti
- Eddie Amarasinghe as Piyum Mahathaya
- Awantha Somasiri as Jason
- Udaya Kumari Ranasingha as piyawathi
- Milinda Perera as Senarath
- Lahiru Dilshan Dharmasena as manthri
- Padma perera as poli siriya

=== Retired ===
- Udeni Chandrasiri as kapu Mahaththaya
- Wickrama Seneviratne as Aron goiya
- Boniface Jayashantha as Puttuwa
- Kumara Siriwardena as Nimal
- Rodney Fraser as Gajan lamaya
- Susila Kottage as Dayawathi
- Nanda Wilegoda as Alis
- Damayantha Perera as Suwanda
- Rahal Bulathsinghala as Podi Mahaththaya
- Ganga Nadee Withana as Tikiri Naga
- Saranapala Jayasuriya as Kade Mudalali
- Dilip Rohana as Kade Hamine's son
- Victor Fernando as Loku Hamuduruvo Chief Monk at the Village Temple
- Jerad Moraes as Kopi Kade Suda
- K A Piyakaru as Kurun gurun
- Thilak Kumara Rathnayake as Somadasa
- Princy Fernando as Violet

=== Deceased ===
- Denawaka Hamine as Loku Hamine
- Martin Gunadasa as Poli Mudalali
- Chandrasiri Kodithuwakku as Abilin Maama
- Susila Kuragama as Ensina
- Damitha Saluwadana as Asilin
- Premadasa Vithanage as Minee Petti Mudalali (Town's Undertaker)
- Lal Senadheera as Annasiwatte Rathnapala (Rathne Lamaya)
- Ranjith Amarasekara as Iskole Mahaththaya
- Raja Sumanapala as Ali Jamis
- Devi Sakunthala as Suwanda's Mother - Angu Hami
- Wimal Wickramarachchi as Samel Appu
- Thusith Pathiraja as Monk at temple
- Kusum Kondegama as Sirisena's mother
- Sunil Hettiarachchi as Giran
- Elson Divithurugama as Lee Mudalali
- Nanasiri Kaluarachchi as Kaluwa
- Chitra Wakishta as Somi Nona
- Wimaladharma Vitharana as Weda mahaththaya
- Srilal Abeykoon as Appuwa
- Kumari Perera as Malini, Kopi Kade duwa
- Prashanna Fonseka as Weda Mahaththaya
- Kumara Ranepura

== Production ==
Andrew Jayamanna was the first director of the program. By 2006, the show had seen six directors, including the Saman Fernando. Sudam Dayarathna and Janaka Mahalpath joined the directing crew after the death of Andrew Jayamanna. Sumith Dias directed the program from 1992 to 1996. Chandika Wijesena and Prabath Dushyantha are now the directors.
