= Martin Gunadasa =

Sri Lankan actor

- මාටින් ගුණදාස
- Born: Sawunda Hannadige Martin Gunadasa; 12 February 1930; Matara, Sri Lanka
- Died: 9 February 2010 (aged 79); Colombo
- Resting place: Borella cemetery
- Occupations: Actor, producer, director, Singer
- Years active: 1965–2009

Sawunda Hannadige Martin Gunadasa (12 February 1930 – 9 February 2010 as මාටින් ගුණදාස) [Sinhala]), popularly known as Martin Gunadasa, was an actor in Sri Lankan cinema, stage drama and television. His most popular role was that of Polee Mudalali in the television serial Kopi Kade.

== Personal life ==
Martin Gunadasa was born on 12 February 1930 in Matara.

Gunadasa died on 9 February 2010 at the age of 79 after a brief illness. His remains were buried in Borella cemetery on 11 February 2010.

== Career ==
He acted in Vesak and Poson stage dramas during school times. Later he arrived Colombo to succeed his ambition to be an actor. Meanwhile, he worked in the government press. Then he became a trade unionist and lost the job during 1981 July strike. After losing his job, he started to produce stage dramas.

In 1965, Gunadasa made his maiden cinema appearance in the film Saaravita. However, his second film Sudo Sudu screened before his first film. Then he acted in many supportive roles particularly as the arrogant "Mudalali" in many films including, Hatha Maha Nidhanaya, Hathara Wate, Kapatikama, Pickpocket, Indunila, Kalana Mithuro and Sinawai Inawai. He also worked as a singer and musician. In 2007, he acted in the stage play Weyan Piyambahi, which centers around HIV/AIDS disease discussing the effects of the disease.

In 1987, Gunadasa was selected to the television serial Kopi Kade by Thevis Guruge. His role as "Poli Mudalali" became highly popularized among the public and he was usually known by his character name rather than real name. He appeared in the series from the beginning which first aired on 1 April 1987. He continued to act in the series for more than 20 consecutive years in 1192 episodes.

== Filmography ==
Year	Film	Role	Ref.
1965	Sudo Sudu	Cow return suggester	
1965	Saaravita		
1965	Hathara Maha Nidhanaya		
1966	Kapatikama	Street Mudalali	
1967	Hathara Kendare		
1968	Indunila		
1969	Pickpocket	Abusive Mudalali	
1970	Lakseta Kodiya	Gate closing guard	
1971	Kesara Sinhayo	Mudalali with flat tire	
1972	Ada Mehemai		
1972	Hathara Wate	Mudalali	
1973	Sinawai Inawai		
1974	Surekha		
1976	Deviyange Theenduwa	Mr. Ranatunga	
1976	Nilla Soya		
1984	Bambara Patikki		
2004	Jolly Boys	Umpire	
2008	Ali Pancha Mage Mithura		
