= Susila Kuragama =

Sri Lankan actress

Susila Kuragama සුසිලා කූරගම
- Born: October 14, 1943; Colombo, British Ceylon
- Died: February 1, 2016 (aged 72); Sri Jayawardenepura Kotte, Sri Lanka
- Other name: Ensina
- Education: Sri Parakramabahu College, Narahenpita
- Occupations: Actress, Dramatist
- Years active: 1950–2016
- Spouse: M. P. Gnanatilake
- Children: 4

Kala Bhushana Susila Kuragama (සුසිලා කූරගම, [Sinhala]; 14 October 1943 – 1 February 2016), was an actress in Sri Lankan cinema, stage drama and television. She became very popular with the role "Ensina" she played in the television serial Kopi Kade.

== Personal life ==
She was born on 14 October 1943 in Thimbirigasyaya, Narahenpita, Colombo. She completed education from Sri Parakramabahu College, Narahenpita.

She was married to M. P. Gunathilake, a retired police constable. The couple has 4 children.

She had been seriously ill for some time and had been receiving treatment at the Sri Jayewardenepura Hospital since 22 January 2016. Kuragama died on 1 February 2016 at the age of 72 while receiving treatment at Sri Jayewardenepura General Hospital. The funeral took place on 3 February 2016 at the Colombo cemetery.

== Career ==
She started acting at the age of 7 in several Nadagam and Noorthi dramas. She made first stage drama appearance with the play Sakkara Wattan produced by GDL Perera. Then she acted in the stage dramas Natabun, Manape, Avanhala, Elara Dutugemunu, Hemamali and Saradiel.

Kuragama made her maiden cinema appearance with the 1978 film Deepanjali directed by Dharma Sri Caldera. Since then, she has acted in many comedic supportive roles in the commercial films such as Muwan Pelessa, Ajasaththa, Gimhane Gee Nade, Vijay Saja Ajay, Naralowa Holman and Juriya Mamai. She has been involved in theater, drama, theater and film production, acting and drama. She produced the stage plays Sarapinage Walawwa, Silin Bilin, Sathmuthu, Diyasena, Upadinna Sakunthala and Rodi Kella.

In 1981, Kuragama was selected to the television serial Kopi Kade by Thevis Guruge. Her role as "Ensina" became highly popularized among the public and she was usually known by his character name rather than real name. She appeared in the series from the beginning which first aired on 1 April 1987.

She sang duet songs with fellow actor Chandrasiri Kodithuwakku such as Lanka Lanka, Oba Dakkoth Hari, Lassana Sande and Esuru Kala Kalaye. She also held the one-man concert "Ensinage Sapirina".

== Filmography ==
Year	Film	Role	Ref.
1978	Deepanjali		
1979	Muwan Palessa	Vadhi dance watcher	
1979	Visihathara Peya		
1980	Raktha		
1981	Ajasaththa		
1986	Gimhane Gee Nade	Agnes	
1987	Hitha Honda Chandiya		
1988	Ko Hathuro		
1990	Madhu Sihina		
1990	Chandi Raja		
1990	Hitha Honda Puthek		
1991	Suwandena Suwandak		
1992	Ranabime Veeraya		
1992	Salli Thibunata Madi		
1992	Bajar Eke Chandiya		
1992	Rajek Wage Puthek		
1993	Bambasara Bisaw		
1993	Juriya Mamai	Ensina	
1995	Wasana Wewa		
1995	Vijay Saha Ajay	Lucy	
1995	Rodaya		
1995	Deviyani Sathya Surakinna	Minister's wife	
1995	Demodara Palama	Rosilin	
1995	Chandiyage Putha	Chutti	
1996	Naralowa Holman	Komarika's mother	
1996	Hitha Hondanam Waradin Na		
1996	Mal Hathai		
1996	Cheriyo Darling	Nurse	
1999	Anduru Sevaneli		
2000	Thisaravi		
2006	Rana Hansi		
2007	Hai Master		
2010	Thank You Berty	Kuri	
TBD	Adda Lanuwa Damma Kodiya		
