= M. P. Drahaman =

Sri Lankan politician and doctor

Hon. Dr M. P. Drahaman MBE

Member of the Ceylon Parliament for Appointed member
- In office 1956–1963
- Succeeded by: Baba Zahiere Lye

Personal details
- Born: Mohamed Purvis Drahaman; 5 November 1889 Colombo, Ceylon
- Died: April 1963 (aged 73) Mecca, Saudi Arabia
- Citizenship: Ceylonese
- Party: All Ceylon Malay Congress
- Spouse: Hazelyn née Saldin
- Children: Sylvion (Siva) Sajurdeen; Werono (Wero) Nizamudin; Revelion (Revo) Soetomo; Georgina Kartini; Mohamed Soekarna
- Education: All Saints College, Galle; Wesley College, Colombo; Colombo Medical School
- Occupation: doctor, politician

Al-Haj Mohamed Purvis Drahaman (5 November 1889 - April 1963) was a Ceylonese Malay medical doctor and politician. He was the leader of the All Ceylon Malay Congress, and was appointed as Member of Parliament in 1956 and 1960.

Born in 1889 in Colombo, Drahaman was educated at All Saints College, Galle and Wesley College, Colombo. He graduated from the Ceylon Medical College in 1928 and entered the Ceylon Medical Service. Five years later he established a private medical practice with after setting up his surgery and dispensary at Rifle Street, Slave Island in 1933. He led several Malay organisations, such as the Ceylon Malay Youth League, the Malay Progressive Association and the All Ceylon Malay Association, the All Ceylon Malay Congress and the Ceylon Malay Cricket Club. Drahaman supported the struggle for Indonesian independence. He was made a Member of the Most Excellent Order of the British Empire in 1953. He was appointed a member of the Order of the British Empire in the 1953 New Year Honours for his services to the Malay community.

He died in Mecca in April 1963, whilst performing Hajj for the second time.
