= Ramzi Rahaman =

Sri Lankan fashion designer and hairdresser

- Born: January 11, 1954 (age 72); Colombo, Sri Lanka

Ramzi Rahaman (born January 11, 1954) is a well known Sri Lankan fashion designer and hairdresser born to a Sri Lankan Malay family.

== Early life ==
Ramzi grew up with his parents, his father, an accountant, and his devoted mother Florine. At age of five a skill for art, which gradually enhanced his makeup and hairstyling abilities. In his younger days his father sent him for lessons to Ivor Baptist, a renowned landscape artist. He loves oil painting and sketching and in school was also very attentive during Arts and English lessons.

== Career ==
Ramzi is one of the founding member of "Sri Lanka Association of Hairdressers and Beauticians (SLAHAB)", which affiliated with the government of Sri Lanka and in conjunction with several professional hairstylists in the country, are presently working on the development of a comprehensive new study syllabus equipped with a skills development program to elevate hairdressing in Sri Lanka to an international level.
