= All Ceylon Malay Political Union =

Political party in Ceylon

The All Ceylon Malay Political Union (Persekutuan Politics Melayu Lankapuri) was a political party in Ceylon (present-day Sri Lanka). The party was founded in 1944 as the All Ceylon Malay Congress. The party sought to promote the rights of the Malay minority and gain parliamentary representation for the community. The party was led by M.P. Drahaman.

During the British rule, the party argued that Malay's should be given a separate (from the Moors) parliamentary representation. The party supported the independence struggle in Indonesia.

The party leader M.P. Drahaman was appointed as Member of Parliament in 1956 (serving until 1959) and again in 1960.

The All Ceylon Malay Political Union published a quarterly journal called Khabar Khabaran.
