= Sellam Nethnam Lellam =

- Sinhala: සෙල්ලම් නැත්නම් ලෙල්ලම්
- Directed by: Tissa Dias
- Written by: Tissa Dias
- Produced by: Sathjaya Films
- Starring: Jayasekara Aponso; Tissa Dias; Wimal Kumara de Costa
- Cinematography: G. Nandasena
- Edited by: Sajeewa Sankalpa
- Music by: Sajeewa Sankalpa
- Release date: 6 September 2017
- Country: Sri Lanka
- Language: Sinhala

Sellam Nethnam Lellam (Sinhala: සෙල්ලම් නැත්නම් ලෙල්ලම්) is a 2017 Sri Lankan Sinhala comedy, family film directed by Tissa Dias and co-produced by Mangala Madugalla and Piyumika Wijeratne for Sathjaya Films. It stars Jayasekara Aponso, and director Tissa Dias in lead roles along with Wimal Kumara de Costa and Mercy Edirisinghe. According to the producer Mangala Madugalla, the film finished its production four years ago, however with the competition to release the film, it took four years to screen the film. It is the 1286th Sri Lankan film in the Sinhala cinema. This is the last film of popular TV actor Srilal Abeykoon before his death on 16 April 2020.

== Cast ==
- Jayasekara Aponso as Robaa
- Tissa Dias as Obaa
- Wimal Kumara de Costa
- Mercy Edirisinghe
- Harry Wimalasena
- Chanchala Warnasuriya
- Ronnie Leitch
- Jeevan Handunnetti
- Premadasa Withanage
- Manel Wanaguru
- Miyuri Samarasinghe
- Srilal Abeykoon
