= Thilak Kumara Rathnayake =

Sri Lankan actor and announcer

Thilak Kumara Rathnayake තිලක් කුමාර රත්නායක
- Born: Rathnayake Mudiyanselage Thilak Kumara Rathnayake; December 16, 1960 (age 65); Kolonnawa, Sri Lanka
- Education: Terrence N. De Silva Maha Vidyalaya
- Occupations: Actor, announcer, politician
- Years active: 1982–present

Deshashakthi Deshabandu Rathnayake Mudiyanselage Thilak Kumara Rathnayake (born 16 December 1960 as තිලක් කුමාර රත්නායක) [Sinhala]), popularly known as Thilak Kumara Rathnayake, is an actor in Sri Lankan cinema, stage drama and television. One of the most popular television actors in Sri Lanka, Rathnayake is most notable for the trade mark role "Somadasa" in the television serial Kopi Kade. Apart from acting, he is a well known announcer and host in outdoor musical shows.

== Personal life ==
He was born on 16 December 1960 in Kolonnawa. He completed education from Terrence N. De Silva Maha Vidyalaya, Kolonnawa.

He also worked as a member of the Colombo Municipal Council. He worked as the media secretary in the Ministry of Productivity Promotion from 2013 to 2019 as well as Media Secretary to Minister Daya Gamage. He also worked as a consultant to the National Youth Services Council, to conduct workshops for the students who follow the Advanced Levels.

In 2012, Rathnayake crashes into a three-wheeler and his right arm was broken near the elbow. However he continued to act in Kopi Kade with the banded arm.

Rathnayake is married to Anusha nimali and the couple has two sons – Anjana, Harshana – and one daughter, Tharushi.

== Career ==
He started to act in several village outdoor plays since child age in 1976. Later he received a job in stage plays as a prompter as well as food supplier under the guidance of B. Siritunga Perera. After few months, he was selected to the stage play Gini Kandu. In 1984, he won the award for the Best supporting actor at State Drama Festival for the play Pathalaye Soldaduwa. His maiden television acting came through Sath Hiru Paya. However, it was not telecast.

In 1987, Rathnayake was selected to the television serial Kopi Kade by Janaka Mahalpath. His role as "Somadasa" became highly popularized among the public. He appeared in the series from the beginning which first aired on 1 April 1987 and continued to act in the series for more than 30 consecutive years up to date.

Apart from Kopi Kade he has acted in many notable roles in the television serials such as, Himi Ahimi, Rail Peeli and Dimuthu Muthu. In 2011, he played the role "Galawatte Jinadasa" in the popular television serial Ama which gained enormous popularity. His maiden cinema appearance came through 1982 blockbuster Hello Shyama directed by M. S. Ananda.

He has directed two television serials, Gavven Gavva and Gimanata Pawana. Then he worked as a script writer for many episodes in Kopi Kade series. Rathnayake also wrote the screenplay of the 2001 film Wasanthaye Kunatuwak. In 2012, he was award the honorary title "Siri Sarasavi Prasadini Kolonnawa Abhimani" by the Kolonnawa Urban Council.

Apart from acting, Rathnayake is a popular announcer in outdoor musical stage as well as television. His first television hosting was for "Shanida Wasanawa" lottery along with popular singer and announcer Charitha Priyadarshani. Since then, he worked as the announcer in many television programs such as "Ayubowan", "Shanida Ayubowan" and lottery programs. He was the announcer when LTTE made a bomb blast to assassinate Gamini Dissanayake in 1994. Luckily, he survived the bomb.

=== Selected stage plays ===
- Ahasin Watunu Minissu
- Deyyoth Danne Na
- Ee Gawa Ge
- Gini Kandu
- Kalani Palama
- Malwadam Anawashyay
- Pathalaye Soldaduwa

=== Selected television serials ===
- Boradiya Kandura
- Ektam Ge
- Gavven Gavva
- Gimanata Pawana
- Kopi Kade
- Labendiye
- Pawena Yakada
- Rathu Ira
- Sudu Anguru
- Uma

== Filmography ==
Year	Film	Role	Ref.
1982	Hello Shyama		
1982	Kele Mal		
1983	Karate Joe		
1985	Varsity Kella		
1989	Badulu Kochchiya		
1990	Pem Raja Dahana		
1990	Wana Bambara		
1991	Obata Pamanai Adare		
1991	Salambak Handai		
1992	Sinhayangeth Sinhaya		
1995	Deviyani Sathya Surakinna	Jeevani's boyfriend	
1997	Punaruthpaththiya		
1999	Re Ru		
2001	Wasanthaye Kunatuwak		
2003	Sundarai Adare	Lionel Dissanayake	
2012	Vijaya Kuweni	Juthindar Senadhipathi	
