= Ali Pancha Mage Mithura =

Ali Pancha Mage Mithura අලි පැංචා මගේ මිතුරා
- Directed by: Luvis Vanderstraaten
- Written by: Luvis Vanderstraaten
- Produced by: SPM Films
- Starring: Wasantha Kumaravila; Anusha Damayanthi; Wilson Karunaratne
- Cinematography: Nimal Nakandala; Dinesh Kumara
- Edited by: M. S. Aliman
- Music by: Asokaa Peiris
- Release date: 27 June 2008
- Country: Sri Lanka
- Language: Sinhala

Ali Pancha Mage Mithura (Sinhala: අලි පැංචා මගේ මිතුරා) is a 2008 Sri Lankan Sinhala thriller film directed by Luvis Vanderstraaten and produced by Judy Muthaiyya for SPM Films. It stars Wasantha Kumaravila and Anusha Damayanthi in lead roles along with Wilson Karunaratne and Ronnie Leitch. Music composed by Asokaa Peiris.

== Cast ==
- Wasantha Kumaravila
- Anusha Damayanthi
- Wilson Karunaratne
- Ronnie Leitch
- Martin Gunadasa
- Sarath Dikkumbura
- Vinoja Nilanthi
