= Devi Sakunthala =

Sri Lankan actress (died 2019)

Devi Sakunthala දේවී සකුන්තලා
- Born: Ummu Salma; Kalutara, Sri Lanka
- Died: 1 March 2019; Colombo, Sri Lanka
- Other names: Angu Hami; R. A. Premavathi
- Occupation: Actress
- Spouse: Piyadasa Perera
- Children: 5
- Relatives: Lakshmi Bai (sister)

Ummu Salma (died 1 March 2019 as දේවී සකුන්තලා) [Sinhala]), popularly known by her stage name Devi Sakunthala, was an actress in Sri Lankan cinema, stage drama and television. She is most notable for the role 'Angu Hami' in the television serial Kopi Kade.

== Personal life ==
Devi Sakunthala was born in Neboda, Kalutara, Sri Lanka to a Malay Muslim family. Her birth name is Ummu Salma. She is also known as R. A. Premavathi. Her sister Lakshmi Bai was a popular actress and singer who sung the song 'Pita Deepa Desha Jaya Gaththa'. Lakshmi went to Tower Hall to perform in stage along with 40-day old Devi. Her parents tried to send Devi to school when she was young, but she did not want to go to school. So she couldn't read or write Sinhala.

She was married to popular comedian in Tower Hall, Piyadasa Perera who played the other main role along with Devi in the stage play Amma. The couple has one daughter and four sons. Her youngest son is Sisira Perera.

== Career ==
When she was seven years old, she played the role of a boy in the play Sweet Honeymoon which was performed at Tower Hall. Devi played many child characters in the early days and later played young characters in the plays such as Sri Vikrama, Vidura, Sathyavadi Harishchandra, Ramayana, Angulimala, Chinthamani, Samudra Devi, Gahala Kella, Sooty Gamarala and Raigama Banda from 1940 to 1958. Later, she played the main character 'Swarna' in Sirisena Wimalaweera's play Amma. She learned dance from Boota Bai who came to Sri Lanka from Bombay and Sarala Bai who was considered as the beacon of the Tower Theater at that time. For the first time, she performed her dance on a huge stage in the center of Kandy during a concert called 'Bombay Dance' which was held in the center of Kandy.

Devi along with her husband Piyadasa Perera, sister Lakshmi Bai and sister's husband Upasena Suryakumar and T. A. P. Almeida, performed the special short comedy drama series on the Sri Lanka Broadcasting Corporation and as well as throughout the country. During this period, she was invited to act in the film Surangani. In the film, she played a major role as 'Ranjani's mother'. Then she made contributions in films such as Pitisara Kella, Siri Sangabo and Sapathak Soya. Meanwhile, she traveled all over the country every day with carnival programs, comedy shows and dramas.

After a brief break from the drama, she returned to the pantheon in the 1980s. In 1981, Devi was selected to the television serial Kopi Kade by Thevis Guruge. Her role as "Angu Hami: Suwanda's mother" became highly popularized among the public and she was usually known by his character name rather than real name. She first appeared in the series from the beginning which first aired on 1 April 1987. and continued to act in the series for 25 consecutive years. Later, she received numerous awards, including the Silver Jubilee Award for her service in the teledrama.

As a Tower Hall actress, she performed in the plays such as Louis Rodrigo's Josie Baba and Ogan Rodrigo's Balagathu Kasiya which became very popular. In 2000, she acted in the concert Tower Hall Nurti Jawanika co-produced by Stanley Master and Victor Wickramage. She has also acted in the play Sooty Gamarala and Raigama Banda for a record fifty years. To mark the 70th anniversary of her acting career, the drama troupe of Sooty Gamarala and Raigama Banda paid homage at the Tower Theater. Then in 2007, she was honored with Lifetime Achievement by Prime Minister Ratnasiri Wickremanayake at The Temple Trees on the occasion of the 97th Anniversary of the Tower Theater as well as Honorary Award from Sri Lanka National Arts Forum in the same year.
