= Southern Province =

South Province or Southern Province may refer to:

- South Province, Cameroon
- South Province, Maldives
- South Province, New Caledonia
- South Province (Western Australia), a former electoral province of Western Australia
- Southern Province, Afghanistan
- Southern Province (Canadian Shield), a physiographic unit in North America
- Southern Province (IMCRA region), a marine biogeographic region of Australia
- Southern Province, Rwanda
- Southern Province, Sierra Leone
- Southern Province, Sri Lanka
- Southern Province (Victoria), a former electoral province of Victoria, Australia
- Southern Province, Zambia
- Moroccan-occupied Western Sahara, which Morocco refers to as its "southern provinces"
- Province of Canterbury, an ecclesiastical province of the Church of England
