= Naleem Hajiar =

- Born: Mohamed Naleem; April 4, 1933; Beruwala
- Died: September 26, 2005 (aged 72)
- Spouse: Rafeeka
- Children: 5
- Parents: Mohamed Ismail (father); Shareefa Umma (mother)

Mohamed Ismail Mohamed Naleem Hajiar (4 April 1933 - 26 September 2005) was a Sri Lankan gem merchant and philanthropist. He was the founder of the Founder of Bairaha Group and known for his social service. In the height of the foreign exchange crisis in 1974, he donated foreign exchange worth Rupees 1.5 million to the Government of Sri Lanka.

Born to an impoverished family on 4 April 1933 at China Fort, Beruwala. His parents were Muhammad Ismail and Sharifa Umma. Leaving school at the fifth standard to seek employment to support his family, Naleem Hajiar entered the gem trade and became one of the leading gem merchants in the country. He married Rafeeka from China Fort, Beruwala. They had four sons and a daughter.

Naleem Hajiar gained prominence in the 1970s when he assisted Dr. N. M. Perera, the Finance Minister to establish the State Gem Corporation to regulate gem exports in 1972. When Sri Lanka faced a severer foreign exchange crisis in 1974, he donated foreign exchange worth Rupees 1.5 million to the government of Prime Minister Sirimavo Bandaranaike. He supported the government of President J. R. Jayewardene by gifting the "Sri Lankan Blue Sapphire" together with Nimal Pathirana and J. Guruge to the government so that it could be gifted to Queen Elizabeth II on her state visit to Sri Lanka in 1981. He donated the Sucharitha building. He established several schools, including the Jamiah Naleemiah and the Iqra Technical Institute. He build the Naleem Hajiar Stadium in his home town, the Bairaha Pavilion at the Singhalese Sports Club Cricket Ground and donated funds to construct the Sugathadasa Indoor Stadium. He turned down offers by President Jayewardene to appoint him to the Colombo Economic Commission and by President Premadasa to award him the title of Deshamanya.
