= All Saints College, Galle =

All Saints' College Galle
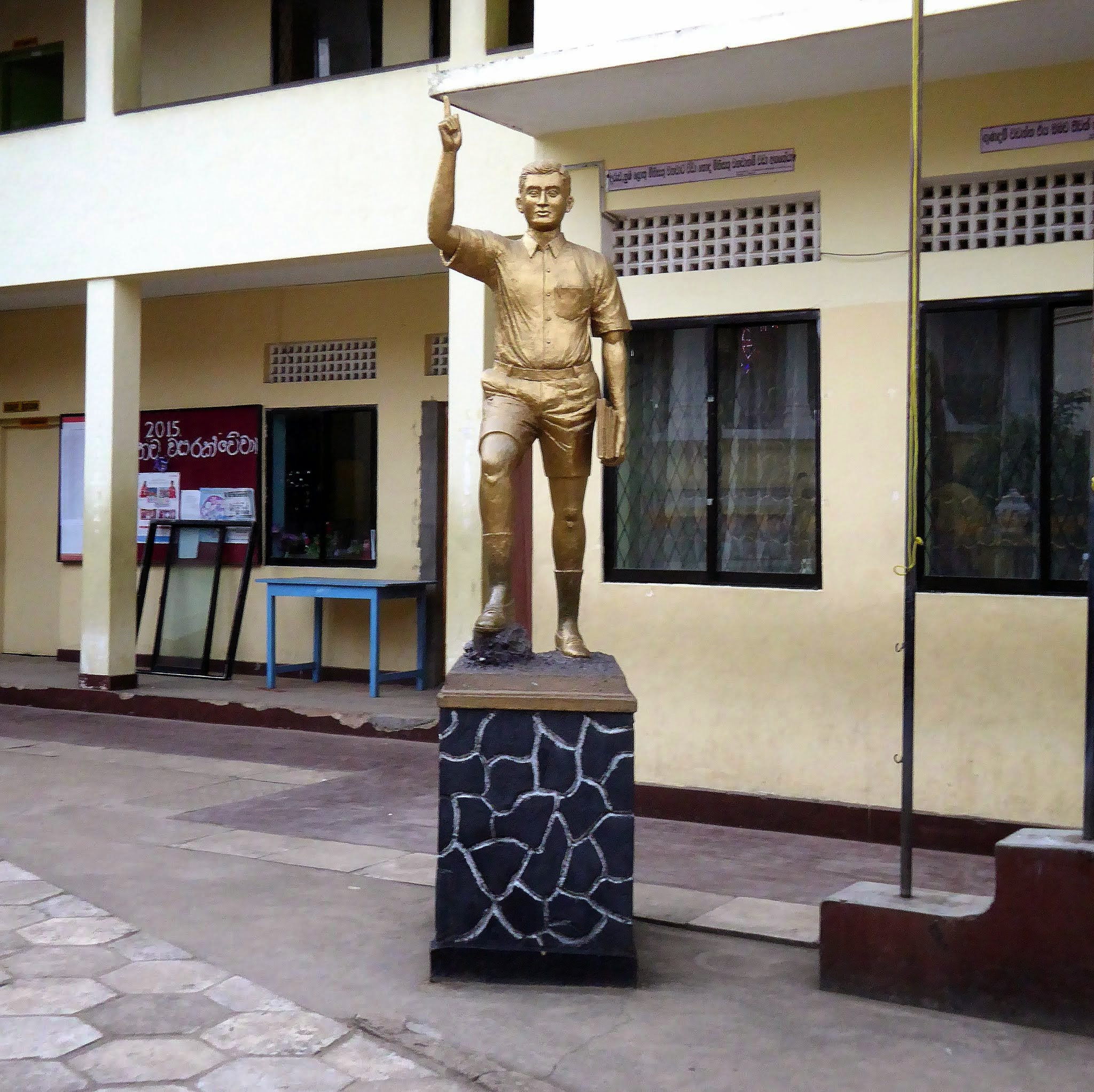

Location
- 19 Lighthouse Street; Galle Fort; Sri Lanka
- Coordinates: 6°01′42.2″N 80°12′58″E

Information
- Former name: Galle Central School
- Type: Government public school
- Established: 1867; 159 years ago
- Principal: Rohitha Nandasena
- Grades: Primary to G.C.E. (A/L)
- Gender: Boys
- Age: 6 to 19
- Enrollment: 1750
- Campus size: 1,594 m^{2} (17,160 sq ft)
- Colours: Purple and gold
- Affiliation: Church of Ceylon, Anglican

All Saints' College is a primary and secondary school located in Galle Fort, Galle, Sri Lanka. The original school, known as Galle Central School, was established by James Millar in 1843. In 1867 it was taken over by the second Bishop of Colombo, Piers Claughton, and the Anglican Church, and renamed the All Saints English School, with 137 students enrolled.

On 9 January 1959 management of the school was transferred to the state, and later renamed All Saints College. The principal at the time was E. P. Silva.

In November 2017 the government, through the Ministry for Southern Development and the Ministry for Law and Order, issued a directive for the school, and a number of other government institutions, to vacate their buildings in the historic fort precinct by the end of December. The directive implied that vacating order was in accordance with UNESCO guidelines. This led to protests by parents and past pupils. It was then found that the government had not consulted the Department of Archaeology, the Ministry for Education or the Sri Lanka National Commission for UNESCO. Subsequently the Department of Archaeology and the Galle Heritage Foundation negotiated for the school to remain in the fort.

== Notable alumni ==
- Richard Lionel Spittel, writer, anthropologist and surgeon
- Sir Oliver Goonetilleke, Governor-General of Ceylon
- Maumoon Abdul Gayoom, President of the Maldives
- D. K. Podi Mahattaya, national footballer
- Sir Mohamed Macan Markar
