= Sri Lanka Malay language =

Sinhala-Tamil creole language of Sri Lanka

Sri Lankan Malay
- A Sri Lankan Malay speaker from Colombo talking about the 18th-century immigration of his ancestors from Java.
- Pronunciation: [mə.la.ju ʃri lə.ŋka]
- Native to: Sri Lanka
- Region: Nationwide, especially in the Hambantota and Matara Districts
- Ethnicity: Sri Lankan Malays, also spoken by some Javanese Sri Lankans and Sinhalese in the Southern Province
- Native speakers: 46,000 (2006)
- Language family: Malay-based creole: Sri Lankan Malay

Language codes
- ISO 639-3: sci
- Glottolog: sril1245
- ELP: Sri Lanka Malay

Sri Lankan Malay ([mə.la.ju ʃri lə.ŋka]), also known as Sri Lankan Creole Malay, Bahasa Melayu, Ja basawa, or Java moli, is a Malay-based creole language spoken in Sri Lanka, formed as a mixture of Sinhala and Shonam (Sri Lankan Muslim Tamil), with Malay being the major lexifier. It is traditionally spoken by the Sri Lankan Malays, Javanese Sri Lankans, and among some Sinhalese in the Southern Province. Today, the number of speakers of the language have dwindled slightly but it has continued to be spoken notably in the Hambantota District of Southern Sri Lanka, which has traditionally been home to many Sri Lankan Malays.

== History ==
During the 17th and 18th centuries, the Dutch government who had occupied Batavia in Java exiled native rebels and royalty to Sri Lanka, and they made their first settlements in Hambantota and Kirinde. Later on, the Dutch also garrisoned their military, composed of Malays, in other parts of Sri Lanka. As a result, some scholars even believe that SLM is closely associated with the Batavian dialect of Malay. Others have proposed that Sri Lankan Malay originates from Eastern Indonesia Malay varieties, based on similarities with Manado Malay and North Moluccan Malay (Ternate Malay).

Today, Sri Lankan Malay, is spoken in the Central (Kandy), Southern (Hambantota and Kirinde), and Western (Slave Island) provinces of the country. The Malay population living in Kinniya and Mutur no longer speak Malay and have resorted to either Sri Lankan Tamil or Sri Lankan Moor Tamil. The majority of the speakers today reside in northern Colombo. The exact number of speakers is unknown and there are no linguistic statistics available on the number of speakers living in or outside of Sri Lanka. Based on the ethnic statistics of Sri Lankan Malays, the estimation of the number of Sri Lankan Malay speakers is probably between 30,000 and 40,000.

== Variation ==
As the language has been influenced by Sinhala, Tamil and English, SLM speakers constantly code-switch between SLM and either one or two of the other mentioned languages. As a result, SLM has a distinct character in each of the provinces mentioned. Sebastian Nydorf has produced “A Grammar of Upcountry Malay” highlighting the said regional variations, however, his efforts have been criticised for having widening disparities within the language. Due to these differences, there are contesting opinions among the SLM speakers themselves: while some speakers say that Malay in Kirinde and Hambantota is of higher status due to its closeness to archaic Malay, others claim that Malay of Slave Island is more vibrant in its evolution, especially in its use of slang which has even been adopted by the Moors. A result of this variation within spoken SLM is a call for standardisation in the written variety, following Bahasa Kumpulan (standardised Malay in Malaysia and Indonesia).

Malays who first arrived in Sri Lanka, keeping with their customs and practices, used the gundul alphabet for writing, which was the Arabic script with five additional letters. This practice had survived until the mid-1940s, and had only been used among specific individuals (such as religious/communal figures) and served limited and exclusive purposes as a minority language within the country. For instance, Malay bills of marriage (kavin) were drawn in gundul. Presently, however, both “Standard Malay” (SM) and SLM use the Romanised script for writing purposes. Some of the advocates of the Romanised script claim that using English following (their interpretation of) Standard British English must be the only way of writing Malay. For instance, using ‘ch’ instead of the letter ‘c’ for the /ch/ sound (failing to realise that ‘ch’ could also produce the /k/ sound). Other users and scholars of SLM claim that Sinhala, being a phonetical alphabet, would be better suited for writing Malay as it would better capture Malay pronunciation. Much studies have not been done on the particular variety of SLM but there are debates that SLM is endangered. “ Much work remains to be done on the various varieties of SLM”. In Colombo community, parents encourage their children to speak in English therefore SLM is endangered in that community . Concerning the Cosmopolitan Colombo community, where the level of education is high, the community typically shows strong linguistic vitality in SLM in the oldest to middle generations and rapidly decreasing linguistic competence (to nil) in the vernacular in the young generation. In sharp contrast is the speech community of Kirinda, with low education and employment levels who still have SLM as a dominant language. The current thrust in the SLM community is that some segments of the community especially those in Kirinda, believe that SLM language must be encouraged, taught, and strengthened while others in the Colombo community believe that Malaysian or Indonesian Malay should be taught as means of revitalising SLM by converging it with a more standardised variety. The Kirinda community in Hambantota is one of the few communities that speak Sri Lankan Malay as their dominant language. Although children in the Kirinda community remain, monolingual speakers of Sri Lankan Malay, before they enter primary school, the speakers of Sri Lankan Malay today are insufficient to maintain the language in future generations. In some communities, Sri Lankan Malay is clearly endangered but there is a debate about whether it is endangered overall since some communities have robust first language speakers.

Trilingualism is achieved by the SLM community due to contact with the larger group of Tamil and the majority of Sinhalese speakers because Sinhala and Tamil were adstrates. Therefore, the restructuring process that occurs in SLM has several grammatical categories that are absent from other Malay varieties, but are found in both Sinhala and Tamil. Considering that mixed languages typically show lexical items predominantly from one source, and grammatical material predominantly from another, the SLM lexicon is primarily of PMD origin while grammatical features are derived from Sinhala and Tamil. Therefore, the use of inflections is largely due to a process of typological congruence of Lankan adstrates. Dative and accusative are marked by suffixes attached to a noun (naƞ-DAT yaƞ-ACC). The verb-final order follows the Sinhala and Tamil typology. This is illustrated as follows:

ni aanak-naƞ baek buku-yaƞ attu aada
This student-DAT good book-ACC one exist
'This student has a good book.'

As in Tamil, accusative tends to mark definiteness in SLM.

Inni kendera-yaƞ bapi
This chair-ACC takes.go
'Take this chair away.'

A direct influence of Sinhala is seen in Ablative syncretism marker (to indicate source) -riƞ.

Market-riƞ ais-tra baaru ikkaƞ billi bawa
market-ABL ice-NEG new fish buy bring
Get me some fresh fish from the market

The SLM possessive case suffix is -pe, derived form of Malaya punya “to possess” distinguishes a feature of contact Malay varieties such as Bazaar Malay and Baba Malay.

goppe tumman go-yaƞ e-tolak
My friend pushed me

As an archaic feature of Malay lingua franca, it is most likely that this feature was maintained from the original varieties of the SLM community and its adaptation led to the development of a new case that distinguishes SLM from its adstrates.
