= Sri Lankan Malays =

Asian ethnic group

Sri Lankan Malays Orang Melayu Langkapuri Orang Melayu Sri Lanka
ශ්‍රී ලංකා මැලේ ජනතාව இலங்கை மலாயர்
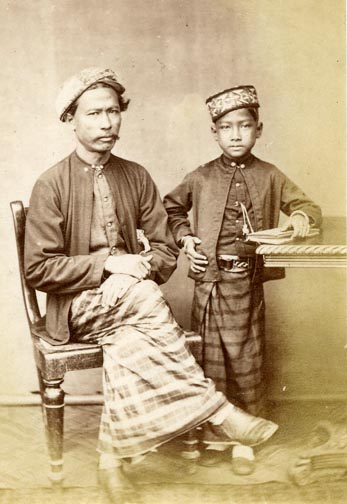
- Sri Lankan Malay man and child, 19th century

Total population
- 40,189 (0.2% of the population) (2012) Significant portion of the Sri Lankan population with partial Malay ancestry (Note: The long history of contact between Maritime Southeast Asia and Sri Lanka has resulted in extensive research on the peopling and genealogical and cultural development of the modern Sri Lankan population.Cultural elements, place names, family names, Sri Lankan royal history, and anthropology have been used as early indicators in understanding the extent of the genealogical impact of early Malays on the Sri Lankan population. There is an extensive history of genetic mixing between native Sri Lankans and ancient waves of Malay and Javanese migrants who settled in Sri Lanka during and prior to the 13th century, particularly in the southeast of the country. Additionally, intermarriage of Ambonese and Balinese male settlers with Sinhalese and Tamil women was common during Dutch rule.Continuous contact through seafaring, conquests, religious connections, and later by colonialism, has resulted in a fair amount of the non-Malay Sri Lankan population, particularly Sinhalese people, having partial Malay admixture.)

Regions with significant populations
- Provinces of Sri Lanka
- Western: 24,718
- Southern: 8,343
- Central: 2,889
- North Western: 1,675

Languages
- Sri Lanka Malay language Sinhala; Some Tamil and English

Religion
- Sunni Islam

Related ethnic groups
- Javanese; Malays; Sri Lankan Moors; Bugis; Peranakan Chinese; Pribumis

Sri Lankan Malays (Sinhala: (ශ්‍රී ලංකා) මැලේ ජනතාව Śrī Laṅkā Mælē Janatāva (Standard); colloquially මැලේ මිනිස්සු / ජා මිනිස්සු Mæle Minissu / Ja Minissu; Tamil: இலங்கை மலாயர், romanized: Ilaṅkai Malāyar), historically known as Ceylon Malays, are an ethnic group in Sri Lanka descended primarily from Southeast Asians who were brought to or settled in Ceylon during Dutch and British colonial rule from the late seventeenth to the nineteenth centuries.

Their ancestors included political exiles, soldiers, convicts, servants and their families from various parts of the Indonesian archipelago. The population was ethnically diverse and included people of Javanese, Bugis, Ambonese, Bandanese, Balinese and Madurese origin. The designation Malay was used broadly in colonial Ceylon to refer to Southeast Asians of diverse ethnic origins, rather than exclusively to ethnic Malays. Dutch and British records applied broader collective labels to Southeast Asians of different regional origins, and the designation Malay became established for the community in Ceylon.

Sri Lankan Malays are predominantly Muslim. The community traditionally speaks Sri Lanka Malay, a distinct contact variety whose grammar has been extensively restructured through prolonged interaction with Sinhala and Tamil. The language has been linked to historical varieties of Malay used as a lingua franca, including Bazaar Malay, Batavian Malay, and eastern Indonesian varieties, particularly Moluccan Malay.

Sri Lankan Malays have played an important role in shaping Sri Lankan culture and identity through cultural diffusion, having contributed to many areas of Sri Lankan culture and society including cuisine, cultural traditions, and place names.

In the 2024 Census of Population and Housing, 26,650 people identified as Malay, representing 0.12% of Sri Lanka's population.

== History ==
=== Precolonial contacts ===
Sri Lanka had documented contacts with maritime Southeast Asia before the formation of the present Sri Lankan Malay community. In the thirteenth century, Chandrabhanu, a ruler of Tambralinga, invaded Sri Lanka. He is described in the Cūḷavaṃsa as a ruler of the Javakas. Modern historical and linguistic scholarship identifies no demographic continuity between these medieval military campaigns and the contemporary Sri Lankan Malay population.

=== Dutch period (1640–1796) ===
The foundational population of the modern Sri Lankan Malay community arrived under Dutch East India Company (VOC) administration beginning in the mid-seventeenth century. The VOC transported Southeast Asians across several administrative categories: political exiles and their retinues, soldiers, convicts, and enslaved laborers. Documented points of origin spanned the Indonesian archipelago, including Java, Madura, Ambon, the Banda Islands, Bali, Bugis-speaking areas of Sulawesi, the wider Moluccas, Bacan, Tidore, Timor, and Sumatra.

Ceylon served as a place of exile for political opponents of Dutch rule in Southeast Asia. Earliest deportees originated in the Moluccas and the Lesser Sunda Islands, followed by Javanese aristocrats and royal exiles from Madura and South Sulawesi. Most aristocratic deportees arrived with family members, retainers, and domestic servants, with many remaining permanently on the island after their sentences expired.

Political exiles included members of ruling families from Java and other parts of the Dutch East Indies. Soldiers formed the largest component of the Southeast Asian population in Ceylon during the Dutch period. In Batavia's multilingual military environment, vehicular Malay served as an interethnic lingua franca, a practice maintained by troops deployed to Ceylon. By the end of Dutch rule, Malay had become the primary language of daily communication across these varied groups, and incoming British administrators subsequently adopted Malay as the standard collective ethnonym for the community.

=== British period (1796–1948) ===
Following the 1796 British takeover of Dutch Ceylon, early military reinforcement continued to rely heavily on the Indonesian archipelago:

- In 1813, Governor Robert Brownrigg enlisted 412 soldiers from Java, who arrived in Ceylon with 214 women and 208 children; contemporary records indicate that many of the recruits were Madurese.
- In 1816, a further 228 Javanese recruits arrived with their families from Semarang and Gresik.

=== Nineteenth and early twentieth centuries ===
Under British administration, the collective designation Malay superseded earlier Dutch-era classifications such as Javaans in official records. While the 1871 census of Ceylon grouped Malays under the category of "Others", the 1881 census was the first to enumerate them separately, recording a population of 8,895.

During the nineteenth century, Sri Lankan Malays maintained a Malay manuscript and literary tradition, including religious and theological texts, stories and poetry. In 1869, Baba Ounus Saldin began publishing Alamat Langkapuri, a Malay-language newspaper in Colombo. It was printed by lithography in gundul, the local term for a modified form of Jawi script. Saldin later published Wajah Selong in 1895, also a lithographed Jawi newspaper.

== Society ==
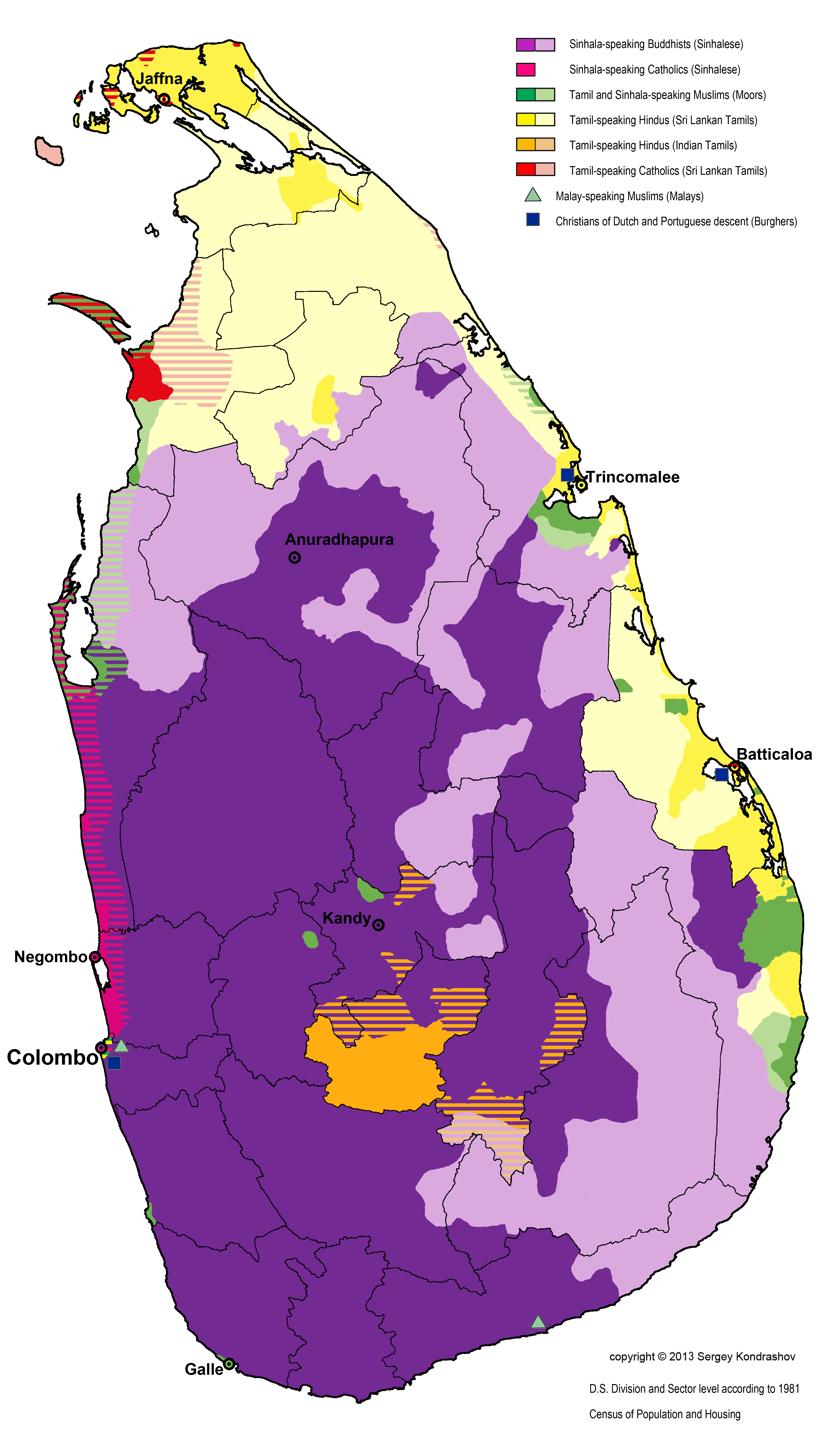
Distribution of languages and religious groups of Sri Lanka on D.S. division and sector level according to the 1981 Census of Population and Housing

=== Demographics ===
Sri Lankan Malays have been separately enumerated in national censuses since 1881. The Department of Census and Statistics recorded 26,650 Malays in the 2024 census, out of a total Sri Lankan population of 21,781,800. Malays therefore accounted for 0.12% of the population.

Population by census year
Census year	Population
1881	8,895
1891	10,133
1901	11,902
1911	12,990
1921	13,402
1931	15,977 (Note: In 1931, ethnicity was not fully enumerated throughout the island; for much of the country the ethnic distribution was estimated using the 1921 census distribution.)
1946	22,500
1953	25,400
1963	33,400
1971	43,459
1981	46,963
2012	44,130
2024	26,650

=== Language ===
A Sri Lankan Malay speaker from Colombo talking about the 18th-century immigration of his ancestors from Java

Depending on where they live in the country and other socio-economic factors, Sri Lankan Malays speak Sinhala, Tamil, and/or English. According to the 2012 census, 79.2%, or 28,975 Sri Lankan Malays also spoke Tamil and 66.2%, or 24,202 also spoke English.

=== Religion ===
Like their ancestors in present-day Indonesia and Malaysia, Sri Lankan Malays are Muslim. Mosques were erected by the local Malays along the coasts of Sri Lanka in places like Hambantota, Beruwela, and Galle. The Jawatte mosque in Colombo and Masjidul Jamiya, the military mosque on Slave Island, are renowned for their architecture and long history. The first two storeys of the Grand Mosque in Sri Lanka was built by Mohammed Balankaya, an exiled Malay noble of the royal house of Gowa (in present-day Sulawesi, Indonesia). Today, the mosque is of great significance and is a symbol of Muslims in Sri Lanka; it is the Grand Mosque of Sri Lanka, where decisions affecting the lives of the island's Muslim population are made.

During Dutch rule, the religious makeup of Sri Lankan Malays was diverse and consisted not only of Muslims but also Christians and Hindus who belonged primarily to the Ambonese and Balinese communities, respectively. Due to skewed migration patterns of Ambonese and Balinese settlers to Sri Lanka, which consisted only of men, intermarriage with Sinhalese and Tamil women was common and resulted in the phasing out of the Christian and Hindu communities that existed in the community early on.

Evidence has demonstrated that certain customs, such as marriage rites, performed by Sri Lankan Malays, fuse Islamic practices with Hindu and Buddhist elements. However, their close connection to Wahhabi thought has resulted in the emergence of a clear Muslim identity, with many of these pre-Islamic practices facing extinction in the community. Sri Lankan Malays are Muslims religiously but not by ethnicity.

=== Genetics ===
A 2015 genome-wide study by Deng et al. of 27 Sri Lankan Malays found that the sampled population was genetically intermediate between South Asian and Southeast Asian populations, with greater genetic affinity to South Asians. An unsupervised ancestry analysis identified an approximately 34% South Asian-associated component, the highest among the four populations examined. In a separate supervised analysis using contemporary Sri Lankan and Malay populations as reference proxies, the authors estimated 55–61% Sri Lankan-related and 39–45% Southeast Asian-related ancestry.

=== Sri Lankan Malay names ===
First and last names among Sri Lankan Malays are mostly of Sanskrit origin and are similar (including equivalents) to names used by Sinhalese people. Common last names include Jayah, Weerabangsa, Sinhawangsa/Sinhawansa, Jayawangsa, Singalaxana, Bangsa Jayah, and Wangsa. Nusantara origin last names include Lye, Samath, Cuttilan, Chunchie, Preena, Hannan, Sallay, Doole, Kitchilan, Kutinun, Kanchil, Sainon, Bongso, Bohoran, Kuppen, and Lappen. Arabic names are also used by Sri Lankan Malays, including Saldin, Assan, Rahman, Drahaman, Bucker, Ramlan, Rajap, Jumat, and Mannan. Honorific prefixes of Javanese and Nusantara origin such as Tuan, Maas, and Raden for males and Gnei, Nona, Sitti Nona, and Gnonya for females are commonly used as first names among Sri Lankan Malays.

== Legacy ==
=== Organisations ===
- All Ceylon Malay Political Union
- Colombo Malay Cricket Club
- Sri Lanka Malay Association
- Malay Association Kolonnawa Electorate (MAKE)
- Conference of Sri Lanka Malays
- Dunia Melayu Dunia Islam
- Kurunegala Malay Association

=== Malay place names in Sri Lanka ===
Some place names in Sri Lanka have references indicating the presence of Javanese and Malay communities or their contribution to the location. Some of these are:

- Ja Goda
- Ja Kotuwa
- Thavasikulam
- Hambanthota (Sampan- Thota)
- Taiyiddi
- Thachathopu
- Jawatte
- Kartel(Slave Island)
- Ja-Ela
- Javakachcheri(Chavakachcheri)
- street names such as Malay Street, Java Lane, Jalan Padang

== See also ==
- Islam in Sri Lanka
- Sri Lankan Malay language
- List of Sri Lankan Malays
- Malayisation
- Malay invasions of Sri Lanka
