= Sri Lankan Muslims (ethnic group) =

இலங்கைச் சோனகர் ලංකා යෝනක اَیلَیچْ چٗونَكَرْ
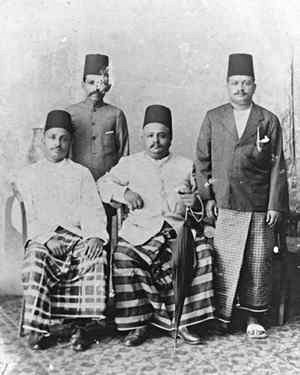
- Sri Lankan Muslim men wearing fez in early 20th century

Total population
- 2,283,246 (10.5% of the Sri Lankan population; 2024)

Regions with significant populations
- Province
- Western: 709,992
- Eastern: 575,936
- North Western: 268,709
- Central: 263,874
- North Central: 101,958

Languages
- Tamil (majority); Sinhala

Religion
- Predominantly Sunni Islam

Related ethnic groups
- Marakkar; Malabar Muslims; Beary; Nawayath; Maldivians; Tamils; Sinhalese

Sri Lankan Muslims (Tamil: இலங்கைச் சோனகர், romanized: Ilaṅkaic Cōṉakar; Arwi: اَیلَیچْ چٗونَكَرْ; Sinhala: ලංකා යෝනක, romanized: Lanka Yonaka; also known as Sri Lankan Moors (formerly Ceylon Moors)) are an ethnic minority group in Sri Lanka, comprising 10.5% of the country's total population.

Most Sri Lankan Muslims are native speakers of the Tamil language and followers of Sunni Islam, as understood by the Shafi'i school of jurisprudence. They are ethnically differentiated from Sri Lankan Tamils and Sri Lankan Malays. The majority of ethnic Muslims residing outside of Sri Lanka's Northern and Eastern provinces also speak Sinhalese as a second language.

== Etymology ==
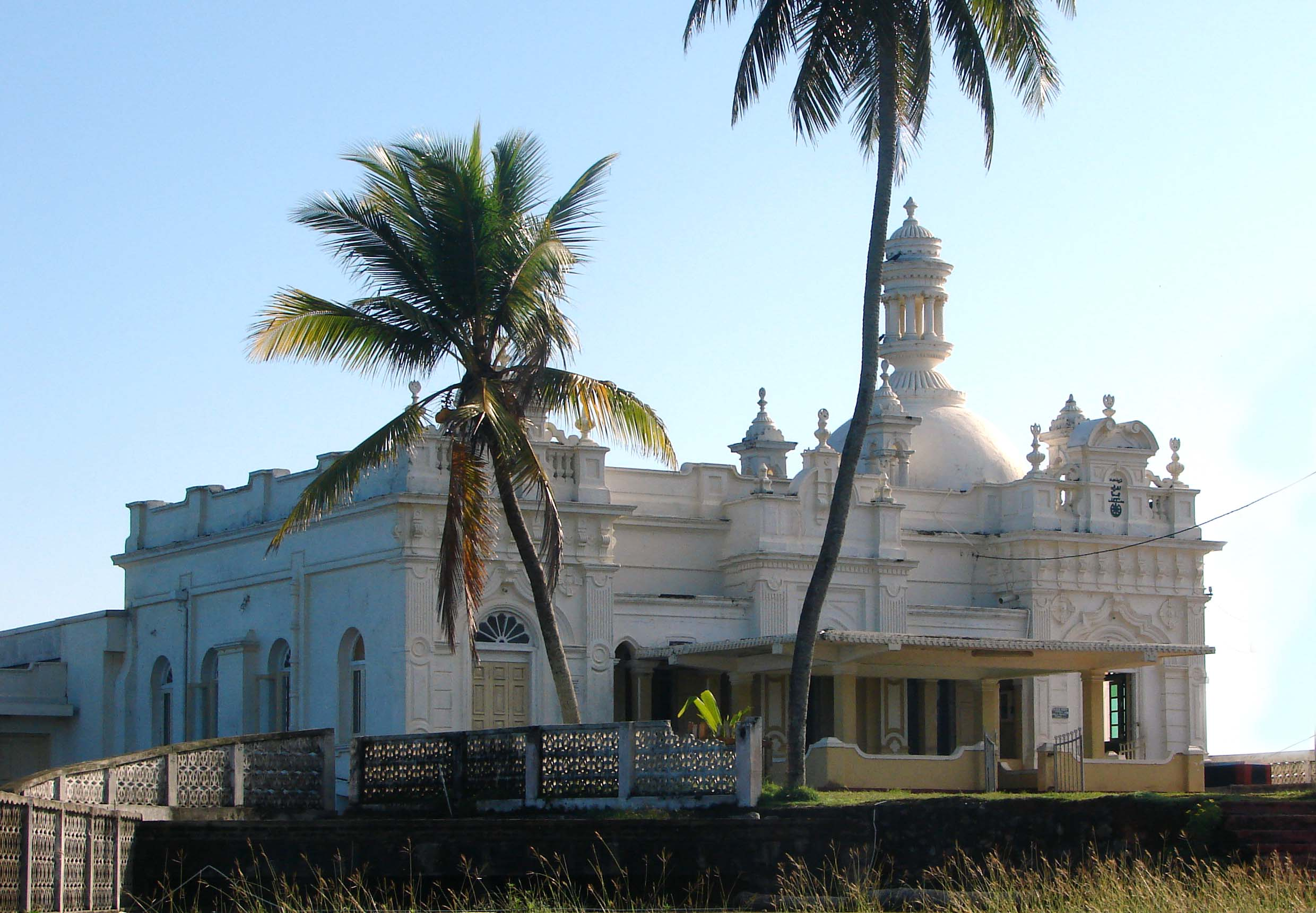
Kechimalai Mosque, Beruwala. One of the oldest mosques in Sri Lanka. It is believed to be the site where the first Arabs landed in Sri Lanka.

The Portuguese called the Muslims in India and Sri Lanka Mouros, after the Muslim Moors known to them in Iberia. The word Moors did not exist in Sri Lanka before the arrival of the Portuguese colonists. The term "Moor" was chosen because of the Islamic faith of these people and was not a reflection of their origin.

The Tamil term Sonakar along with the Sinhala term Yonaka, has been thought to have been derived from the term Yona, a term originally applied to Greeks, but sometimes also Arabs and other West Asians. Historically, all Tamil speaking Muslim communities in India and Sri Lanka were known as the Sonakar.

== Sub-Divisions of Muslims ==
In present day, the ethnic Muslim population is broadly divided into three sections. The most numerous are the West Coast Muslims, comprising about 1,522,164 individuals (67% of the total Muslim population), who inhabit Sinhalese majority cities like Colombo, Kandy, Galle, Matara and Negombo, and are primarily engaged in trading and commerce. According to the most recent Lankan census of 2024, West Coast Muslims make up 42.9% of the population of the capital city of Colombo. Accordingly, about half of all Mayors of Colombo since independence have been Muslim.

The Coast Moors, also known as Indian Moors, number 182,660 (8%) and are Tamil-speaking Marakkars from South India concentrated in commercial ports such as Colombo, Galle, and Matara. Since both the native Sri Lankan Muslim population and the British-era Indian Muslim population originate from the Marakkar caste, extensive intermarriage between the two communities has occurred since independence. Consequently, the Coast Moor population has been largely absorbed into the West Coast Muslim population, with many members of the younger generation of mixed descent.

The East Coast Muslims comprise about 761,082 individuals (33%), form a geographically concentrated population in the Batticaloa (26.9%), Trincomalee (46.1%) and Ampara Districts (46.1%). they are primarily engaged in irrigated rice cultivation, and to a lesser extent, in retail trade.

== History ==
=== Origins theories ===
Many Sri Lankan Muslims are Marakkars, and share the same history with Tamil Nadu Marakkars in particular, and Marakkars from Kerala. This can be seen from the large number of prominent Sri Lankan Muslims who hold the surname of Marikkar (and its variations) and through the extremely strong linguistic and cultural similarities held by these communities. It is said there has been a strong relationship between Marakkar communities through endogamous marriages. The similarities have been described as "enormous" by M. M. M. Mahroof.

The Sri Lankan Muslims are of diverse origins with some tracing their ancestry to Arab traders who first settled in Sri Lanka around the 9th century, and who intermarried with local Tamil and Sinhala women. Recent genetic studies, however, have suggested a predominant Indian origin for Muslims compared to the Arab origin speculated by some. Perera et al. (2021) in their genetic analysis of the Muslims stated the following in their report: "In contrast, Sri Lankan Muslims have descended exclusively from Muslim male merchants of either Arabic or of Indian origin, who came to Sri Lanka for trading. During the fourteenth century, they started to settle in coastal areas in Sri Lanka and espoused local women, who were either Sinhalese or Sri Lankan Tamil". The concentration of Muslims is the highest in the Ampara, Trincomalee and Batticaloa districts.

Some scholars hold the view that the Sri Lankan Muslims in general are descended from the Marakkar, Mappilas, Memons, Lebbes, Rowthers and Pathans of South India.

Sri Lankan Muslim scholar Dr. Ameer Ali in his summary of the origin history of Sri Lankan Muslims states the following:

'In actual fact, the Muslims of Sri Lanka are a mixture of Arab, Persian, Dravidian and Malay blood of which the Dravidian element, because of centuries of heavy Indian injection has remained the dominant one.'

Historian Patrick Peebles states by the end of the 19th century Sri Lankan Muslims comprised about 6–7 percent of the population, and that "the majority of Muslims were of South Indian origin and spoke Tamil."

Another view suggests that the Arab traders, however, adopted the Sinhalese and Tamil languages only after settling in Sri Lanka. The cultural practices of the Muslims also vary significantly from the other communities on the island, but share much in common with the Tamil Muslims of Tamil Nadu. This view is dominantly held by the Sinhalese-favouring section of the Muslims, as well as the Sri Lankan government, which lists the Muslims as a separate ethnic community.

Although the caste system is not observed by the Muslims as it is by the other ethnic groups in Sri Lanka, their kudi system (matriclan system) is an extension of the Tamil tradition.

=== Medieval era ===
The Sri Lankan Muslims along with Mukkuvar dominated once in medieval era the pearl trade in Sri Lanka. Alliances and intermarriages between both communities were observed in this period. They held close contact with other Muslims of Southern India through coastal trade.

The Muslims had their own court of justice for settling their disputes. Upon the arrival of the Portuguese colonisers in the 16th century, a large population of Muslims was expelled from cities such as the capital city Colombo, which had been a Muslim-dominated city at that time. The Muslims migrated to the eastern part of the island, and settled there through the invitation of the Kingdom of Kandy. Robert Knox, a British sea captain of the 17th century, noted that the Kings of Kandy built mosques for the Muslims. Sri Lanka being a predominately agricultural economy, International trade was underdeveloped during the medieval period. The arrival and settlement of Arab-Muslim merchants on the island's coastal regions initiated overseas trade and helped unlock the country's economic potential.

=== Sri Lankan Civil War ===
The Sri Lankan Civil War was a 26-year conflict fought on the island of Sri Lanka between the government and the separatist Tamil militant Liberation Tigers of Tamil Eelam (LTTE). The LTTE attempted to create an independent Tamil state called Tamil Eelam in northeast Sri Lanka.

Since 1888, under the initiative of Ponnambalam Ramanathan, the Sri Lankan Tamils launched a campaign to classify Tamil-speaking Sri Lankan Muslims as Tamils, primarily to bolster their population numbers for the impending transition to democratic rule in Sri Lanka. Their view holds that the Sri Lankan Muslims were mainly Tamil converts to Islam. According to some Tamil nationalists, the concept of Arab descent amongst the Tamil-speaking Muslims was invented just to keep the community separate from the Tamils, and this 'separate identity' intended to check the latter's demand for the separate state of Tamil Eelam and to flare up hostilities between the two groups in the broader Tamil–Sinhalese conflict.

The expulsion of the Muslims from the Northern Province was an act of ethnic cleansing carried out by the Liberation Tigers of Tamil Eelam in October 1990. In Northern Sri Lanka, the LTTE forcibly expelled the Muslim population from the Northern Province at gunpoint and confiscated their properties. Yogi, the LTTE's political spokesman, claimed that this expulsion was carried out in retaliation for atrocities committed against the Tamils in the Eastern Province by Muslims, who were seen by the LTTE as collaborators of the Sri Lankan Army.

Sri Lanka's Muslims still hold a bitter grudge for their forced expulsion from the North by the LTTE. In 2002, LTTE leader Vellupillai Prabhakaran formally apologized for the expulsion of the Muslims from the North. There has been a stream of Muslims travelling in and out of Jaffna since the end of the war. Some families have returned and the re-opened Osmania College, a public school in Jaffna which was once a prominent educational institution for the city's Muslim community. According to a Jaffna Muslim source, there is a floating population of about 2,000 Muslims in Jaffna. Around 1,500 are Jaffna Muslims, while the rest are Muslims from outside of Jaffna. About 10 Muslim shops are functioning and the numbers are slowly growing.

=== Genetic studies ===
Genetic studies undertaken in the year 2021 by University of Colombo and Genetech Molecular Diagnostics led by Dr Gayani Galhena, made the following observation in paragraph 6, in the faculty of science web publication based on the latest X chromosome fingerprint analysis: "Sinhalese and Muslims are genetically closer to each other compared to Sinhalese and Sri Lankan Tamils"

Dr Sarabjit Mastanain found in 1996 based on genetic analysis of human blood group systems from 508 individuals that the cophenetic correlation was 0.8956 which indicates Sinhalese & Tamil as native population. Also, he reflected on the genetic distance among five populations of Sri Lanka as per given below eigenvector plot of the R-matrix.

- Genetic distance (Papiha, Mastana, Jayasekara, 1996) (5 populations of Sri Lanka)
  - - Burgher
  - - Malay
    - - Muslim
      - - Tamil
        - Sinhalese

According to a study published in 2021 using 16 X-chromosomal short tandem repeat markers (STRs) conducted on 838 unrelated individuals from the four major ethnicities, there is a sex biased demographic history among Sri Lankan ethnicities. According to analysis of molecular variance, Sinhalese, Sri Lankan Tamils and Muslims are highly panmictic but Indian Tamils had statistically significant genetic subdivision from both Sinhalese and Muslims. According to the genetic distance calculated the Muslims were closest to Sinhalese and then Sri Lankan Tamil with a significant distance from Indian Tamils. The Nei genetic distance for Sinhalese and Muslims is 0.0123, SL Tamil and Muslims is 0.0233 while Indian Tamil and Muslims 0.0293. The study was carried on the X-STRs DXS10148, DXS10135, DXS8378, DXS7132, DXS10079, DXS10074, DXS10075, DXS6801, DXS6809, DXS6789, DXS7424, DXS101, DXS7133, DXS9902, HPRTB and DXS7423. The researchers said this reflected descent from Indian Muslim merchants who married local Sinhalese and Sri Lankan Tamil women.

== Society ==
Historical population
Year	Pop.	±%
1911	233,900	—
1921	251,900	+7.7%
1931	289,600	+15.0%
1946	373,600	+29.0%
1953	464,000	+24.2%
1963	626,800	+35.1%
1971	855,724	+36.5%
1981	1,046,926	+22.3%
2012	1,892,638	+80.8%
2024	2,283,246	+20.6%

=== Demographics ===
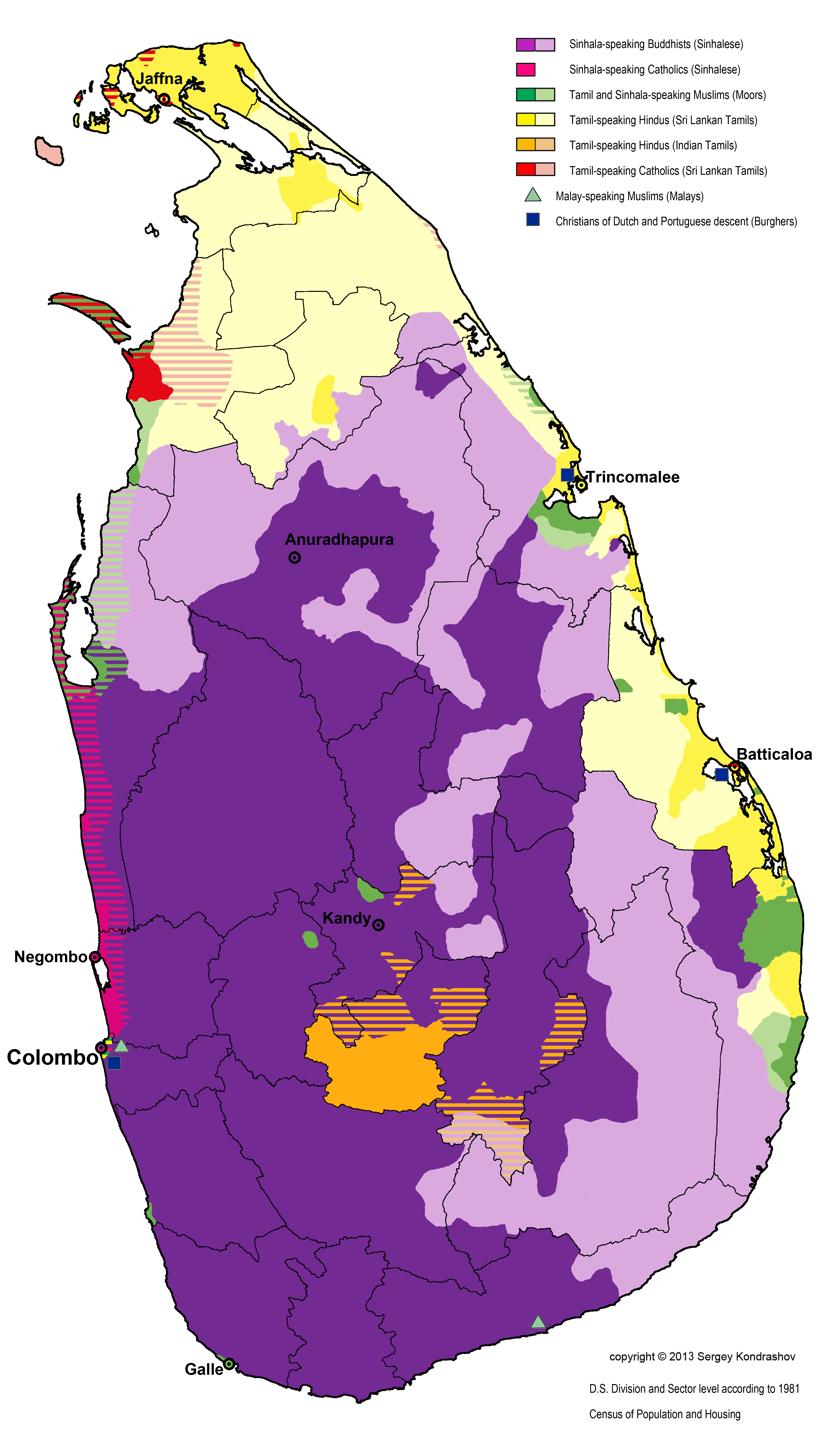
Distribution of languages and religious groups of Sri Lanka on D.S. division and sector level according to the 1981 Census of Population and Housing

Percentage of Sri Lankan Muslim people in Sri Lanka by district according to the 2012 census.

Sri Lankan Muslim Population and Percentage

Census	Population	Percentage
1881	184,500	6.69%
1891	197,200	6.56%
1901	228,000	6.39%
1911	233,900	5.70%
1921	251,900	5.60%
1931 Estimate	289,600	5.46%
1946	373,600	5.61%
1953	464,000	5.73%
1963	626,800	5.92%
1971	855,724	6.74%
1981	1,046,926	7.05%
2011	1,892,638	9.2%

=== Language ===
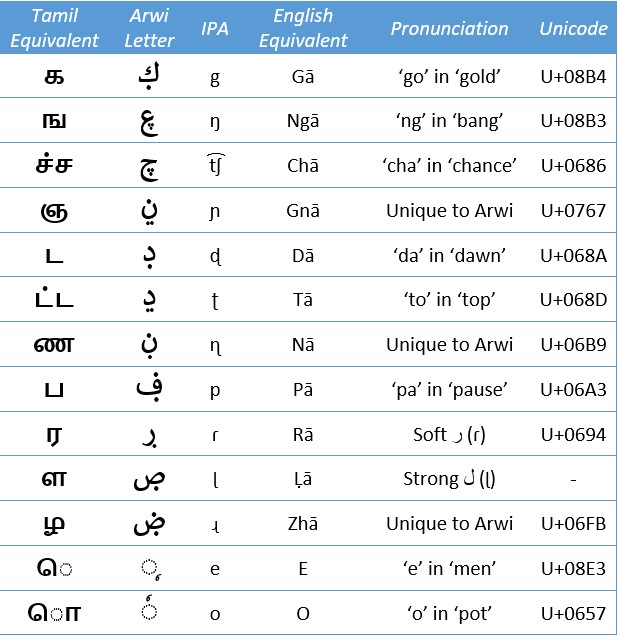
Letters of the Arwi alphabet and their equivalent Tamil letter

Depending on where they live in the country, they may also additionally speak Tamil, Sinhala and or English. According to the 2012 Census 58.7% or 862,397 Sri Lankan Muslims also spoke Sinhala and 30.4% or 446,146 Sri Lankan Muslims also spoke English. Sri Lankan Muslim Tamil bears the influence of Arabic.

==== Sri Lankan Muslim Tamil ====
The vast majority of Sri Lankan Muslims speak Tamil as their native language. Religious sermons are delivered in Tamil even in regions where Tamil is not the majority language.

The Tamil dialect spoken by Muslims in Sri Lanka is identified as Sri Lankan Muslim Tamil (SLMT). It is a social dialect of Sri Lankan Tamil that falls under the larger category of the colloquial variety of Tamil. SLMT has distinct phonological, morphological and lexical differences in comparison to other varieties of SLT since it is influenced by the Arabic language. Due to this, we can see the use of several Persian-Arabic loan words in SLMT vocabulary. This distinctiveness between SLMT and other spoken varieties of SLT brings out the different religious and cultural identities of the Tamil speaking ethnic groups.

As an example, the SLT term for the corpse is ‘caavu’ but the SLMT uses the Arabic term ‘mayyatu’. Another example is the verb ‘pray’ which is ‘vanaku’ in SLT and ‘tholu’ in SLMT. The kinship terms used by Muslims in the country are also different when compared with the SLT terms, but are shared with Tamil Muslims of Tamil Nadu. The following are some terms that show the difference between SLMT and most varieties of SLT/Tamil.

Kinship Term	SLT/Tamil	SLMT
Father	appa	vaapa
Mother	amma	umma
Brother	anna	naana/kaaka (older)
Sister	akka	dhaatha (older)
Younger sister	thangachchi	thangachchi
Son	makan	mavan
Daughter	makal	maval

Interestingly, one can also notice ethno-regional variations in SLMT and categorise them into two major sub-dialects such as North-Eastern Muslim Tamil (NEMT) and Southern Muslim Tamil (SMT). SMT is found in the Southern, Western, and Central provinces with some variations and other linguistic features within it. As an example, Muslims in the Western province, especially in Colombo tend to code-mix their speech with Tamil and English terms.

On the other hand, NEMT is found in Northern and Eastern provinces. One phonological variation between these two sub-dialects is that SMT replaces the Tamil sound /sa/ with /sha/. Another phonological variation is that SMT uses voiced plosives such as /b, d, j, g/ whereas NEMT uses voiceless plosives such as /v, p, t, c, k/ instead of them.

English Term	SMT	NEMT
Drain	gaan	kaan
Fear	bayam	payam
Money	shalli	salli
Sky	banam	vaanam
Item	Shaaman	saaman
Well	genar	kinar

Another symbolic representation of the Southern variety is the shortening of Tamil verbs. As an example, the verb ‘to come’, known as ‘varukhudu’ in SLT/NEMT, would be shortened and pronounced as ‘varudu.’

Furthermore, the Muslims like their counterparts in Tamil Nadu, use the Arwi which is a written register of the Tamil language with the use of the Arabic alphabet. The Arwi alphabet is unique to the Muslims of Tamil Nadu and Sri Lanka, hinting at erstwhile close relations between the Tamil Muslims across the two territories.

However, SLMT is only a spoken variety that is limited to the domestic sphere of the community members and is something shared with the Marrakar community of Tamil Nadu. In addition, they frequently tend to code-switch and code-mix when they communicate with a non-Muslim or a fellow Muslim in a different region.

== Culture ==
The Sri Lankan Muslims have been strongly shaped by Islamic culture, with many customs and practices according to Islamic law. While preserving many of their ancestral South Asian customs, the Muslims have over time adopted several Arabic-Islamic practices.

The Muslims practice several customs and beliefs which they closely share with the Arab, Sri Lankan Tamil, and Sinhalese People. Tamil and Sinhala customs such as wearing the Thaali or eating Kiribath were widely prevalent among the Muslims. Arab customs such as congregational eating using a large shared plate called the 'sahn' and wearing of the North African fez during marriage ceremonies feed to the view that Muslims are of mixed Sinhalese, Tamil, and Arab heritage.

The late 19th century saw the phase of Islamization of Sri Lankan Muslims, primarily under the influence of M. C. Siddi Lebbe. He was a leading figure in the Islamic revival movement, and strengthened the Muslim identity of the Sri Lankan Muslims. He was responsible for the ideological framework for the Muslim ethnicity in Sri Lanka.

Sri Lankan Muslims are officially categorized as a separate ethnicity separate from Sri Lankan Tamils and Sri Lankan Malays.

== See also ==
- Islam in Sri Lanka
- Indian Moors
- List of Sri Lankan Muslims
- Sri Lankan Malays
- Memons in Sri Lanka
