= Thevis Guruge =

Sri Lankan broadcaster (died 1989)

Thevis Guruge තේවිස් ගුරුගේ
- Died: 23 July 1989
- Occupation: Radio Journalist

Thevis Guruge (died 23 July 1989) was a distinguished broadcaster with Radio Ceylon and subsequently the Sri Lanka Broadcasting Corporation. He was the first Sinhala Announcer with Radio Ceylon, the oldest radio station in South Asia.

== Iconic status ==
He enjoyed iconic status alongside other announcers of the station, Guruge was one of the early pioneers particularly where the Sinhala service was concerned. Millions tuned into Radio Ceylon. He was the second announcer in Radio Ceylon, who joined in 1949. He retired in 1983.

== Chairman of ITN ==
In the 1980s Thevis Guruge was appointed Competent Authority of ITN in Sri Lanka after it was acquired by the government. Guruge was assassinated in 1989 by the JVP, whose youth squad had threatened him the week before.

== Assassination ==
On July 23, 1989, Guruge was killed by the rebels when he was going to a shop in the morning on the bridge at Polhengoda Road in Narahenpita. He was shot five times with a T-56 assault rifle. The funeral took place on 25 July 1989 at Borella cemetery.

== See also ==
- Sri Lankan civil war
