= 2016 in Sri Lanka =

- Decades: 1990s; 2000s; 2010s; 2020s
- See also: Other events of 2016; Timeline of Sri Lankan history

The following lists notable events that occurred during 2016 in Sri Lanka.

== Incumbents ==
- President – Maithripala Sirisena
- Prime Minister – Ranil Wickremesinghe
- Chief Justice – K. Sripavan

=== Governors ===
- Central Province – Surangani Ellawala (until 14 March); Niluka Ekanayake (starting 14 March)
- Eastern Province – Austin Fernando
- North Central Province – P. B. Dissanayake
- Northern Province – H. M. G. S. Palihakkara (until 16 February); Reginald Cooray (starting 16 February)
- North Western Province – Amara Piyaseeli Ratnayake
- Sabaragamuwa Province – Marshal Perera
- Southern Province – Hemakumara Nanayakkara
- Uva Province – M. P. Jayasinghe
- Western Province – K. C. Logeswaran

=== Chief Ministers ===
- Central Province – Sarath Ekanayake
- Eastern Province – Ahamed Nazeer Zainulabdeen
- North Central Province – Peshala Jayarathne
- Northern Province – C. V. Vigneswaran
- North Western Province – Dharmasiri Dassanayake
- Sabaragamuwa Province – Maheepala Herath
- Southern Province – Shan Wijayalal De Silva
- Uva Province – Chamara Sampath Dassanayake
- Western Province – Isura Devapriya

== Events ==
=== January ===
- 13 January – Commission to Investigate Allegations of Bribery or Corruption investigations: Former MP Duminda Silva, who had been arrested for failing declare assets in 2011, 2012 and 2013, is released on bail.
- 19 January – United National Front for Good Governance (UNFGG) National List MP A. R. A. Hafeez resigns from Parliament.
- 21 January – Financial Crimes Investigation Division investigations: Nalaka Godahewa, R. Ibrahim and Dhammika Manjira Perera, who had been arrested in December 2015 in connection with misappropriation of funds at the Securities and Exchange Commission, are released on bail.
- 25 January – Murder of K. Tharshan: Six year old K. Tharshan is raped and murdered in Sampur.
- 26 January – M. S. Thowfeek is sworn in as a UNFGG National List MP, replacing A. R. A. Hafeez who resigned on 19 January 2016.
- 30 January – Financial Crimes Investigation Division investigations: Carlton Sports Network (CSN) directors Yoshitha Rajapaksa, Nishantha Ranatunga, Kaushal Dissanayake, Ravinath Fernando and Rohan Welivita are arrested in connection with money laundering at CSN.

=== February ===
- 9 February – Democratic Party leader Sarath Fonseka is sworn in as a UNFGG National List MP, replacing minister M. K. A. D. S. Gunawardana who died on 19 January 2016.
- 16 February – Commission to Investigate Allegations of Bribery or Corruption investigations: Former minister Kumara Welgama, who had been arrested in connection with financial irregularities at the Sri Lanka Transport Board, is released on bail.
- 25 February – Democratic Party leader Sarath Fonseka is appointed to the Cabinet.

=== March ===
- 10 March – Financial Crimes Investigation Division investigations: Former minister Basil Rajapaksa and former director general of the Divi Neguma Department R. R. K. Ranawaka, who had been arrested in connection with misappropriation of state funds, are released on bail.
- 14 March – Financial Crimes Investigation Division investigations: Yoshitha Rajapaksa, Kaushal Dissanayake, Ravinath Fernando and Rohan Welivita, who had been arrested in January 2016 in connection with money laundering at CSN, are released on bail.
- 16 March – Financial Crimes Investigation Division investigations: Nishantha Ranatunga, who had been arrested in January 2016 in connection with money laundering at CSN, is released on bail.
- 29 March – A suicide kit, mines, explosives and ammunition are discovered at a house in Maravanpulavu near Chavakachcheri.
- 30 March – Former Liberation Tigers of Tamil Eelam (LTTE) cadre Ramesh (Edward Julian) is arrested in Iluppaikkadavai in connection with the Chavakachcheri explosives find.

=== April ===
- 11 April
  - A further state minister and two deputy ministers are appointed.
  - A 59-year-old woman and her 33-year-old daughter are killed when the autorickshaw they are traveling in is hit by a speeding military vehicle near Vigneswara College in Trincomalee.
- 20 April – Murder of Wasim Thajudeen: The former crime OIC of the Narahenpita Police, IP Sumith Champika, is arrested by the Criminal Investigation Department in connection with Wasim Thajudeen's murder.
- 22 April – Former president Mahinda Rajapaksa and former minister G. L. Peiris meet Udayanga Weeratunga, who is wanted in Ukraine in connection with supplying arms to pro-Russian rebels, in Udon Thani, Thailand.
- 23 April – Former LTTE cadre Damotharan Jayakanth is arrested by the Terrorist Investigation Division (TID) for not having undergone "rehabilitation".
- 24 April – Colonel Ram (Ethirmannasingham Harichandran), the LTTE's former commander for Ampara District, is abducted from his home in Thampiluvil by three unidentified men in a blue van. The abductors are later identified as the police's TID.
- 25 April – Holy Family Convent, Bambalapitiya students Yasara Perera and Sharon Schuilling are killed as they cross the railway line in Dehiwala.
- 26 April – Lieutenant Colonel Kalaiarasan (Ganeshapillai Arivalahan), the LTTE's chief of intelligence for Trincomalee District, is arrested in Trincomalee by the TID in connection with the Chavakachcheri explosives find.
- 27 April
  - V. S. Sivakaran, the leader of the Illankai Tamil Arasu Kachchi's youth wing and editor of the Puthiyavan, is arrested in Mannar by the TID in connection with the Chavakachcheri explosives find. He is released on bail the following day.
  - Lieutenant Colonel Nagulan (Kanapathipillai Sivamoorthy), the former commander of the LTTE's Charles Anthony Brigade, who was thought to have been killed by the military in 2007, is arrested in Kopay by the TID.

=== May ===
- 2 May – Lieutenant Colonel Praba (Krishnapillai Kalainesan), the LTTE's chief of intelligence for Batticaloa District, is arrested in Eravur.
- 3 May – A brawl in Parliament between Joint Opposition and government MPs results in UNFGG MP Sandith Samarasinghe being hospitalised.
- 14 May – Cyclone Roanu: Beginning of days of torrential rain across Sri Lanka which cause floods and landslides affecting half a million people, killing at least 82 and leaving more than 100 missing.
- 21 May – Jayanthi Kuru-Utumpala becomes the first Sri Lankan to reach the summit of Mount Everest.

=== June ===
- 2 June – British citizen Velauthapillai Renukaruban is assaulted and tortured after being detained by the police in Jaffna.
- 5 June – A fire at the Salawa army camp near Kosgama causes a series of explosions which results in the death of one soldier and the evacuation of thousands living nearby.
- 9 June – Pradeep Kumara Perera kills himself and two women (Walpola Mudiyanselage Buddhika Neelanyani and Sirimathi Walpola) using a hand grenade.
- 11 June – Murali (Sivarasa Sivakulan), a government backed paramilitary operative and close confidant of former Janna Commander Major General Mahinda Hathurusinghe, is arrested by the TID in connection with the Chavakachcheri explosives find.
- 30 June – Democratic Party leader Sarath Fonseka joins the United National Party.

=== July ===
- 11 July – Financial Crimes Investigation Division investigations: MP Namal Rajapaksa is arrested in connection with laundering Rs. 70 million given by Indian property development company Krrish Group for rugby development.
- 16 July – Violent clashes between Sinhalese and Tamil students at the University of Jaffna leads to the evacuation of all Sinhalese students and closure of the university.
- 18 July – Financial Crimes Investigation Division investigations: Former minister Basil Rajapaksa is arrested in connection with misappropriation of state funds from the Divi Neguma Department.
- 28 July – A protest march by the Joint Opposition (Jana Satana Pada Yatra) from Kandy to Colombo begins.

=== August ===
- 5–21 August – 2 athletes from Sri Lanka compete at the 2016 Summer Olympics in Rio de Janeiro, Brazil.
- 12 August – President of the Galle Cricket Association, Halambage Premasiri is murdered around Friday night by two individuals who were arrived in a white motor car near the residence of him at Manimulla area in Ambalangoda. Premasiri was shot dead by the unknown suspects while he was driving home with his 12-year old son.
- 15 August – Financial Crimes Investigation Division investigations: MP Namal Rajapaksa is arrested in connection with laundering Rs. 45 million through two companies he owns (NR Consultation Private Limited and Gowers Corporation Private Limited) and using it to buy shares in Hello Corp Private Limited.

=== September ===
- 8 September – Kolonnawa shootings: Sarath Bandara, Withanalage Anura Thushara de Mel, Janaka Bandara Galagoda, Chaminda Ravi Jayanath (Dematagoda Chaminda) and former MP Duminda Silva are convicted of the murder of Mohamed Azmi, Dharshana Jayathilake, Manivel Kumaraswamy and former MP Bharatha Lakshman Premachandra in October 2011 and sentenced to death.
- 9 September – Sri Lankan cricketer Tillakaratne Dilshan retires from all international cricket. He ends his 17-year career as 11th highest ODI scorer and 2nd highest T20I scorer of all time.

=== October ===
- 20 October – University of Jaffna students V. Sulakshan and N. Gajan are shot dead by police in Kokkuvil.

=== December ===
- 8 December – President Sirisena revokes and annuls the proclamation by Governor Robert Brownrigg on 10 January 1818 declaring the 19 leaders of the Uva Wellassa Rebellion to be traitors.
- 17 December – 11 people are killed and several injured in a head collision between a van and a bus in Sangathani near Chavakachcheri.
- 24 December – Assassination of Nadarajah Raviraj: All five defendants are acquitted by the all-Sinhala jury.

== Deaths ==
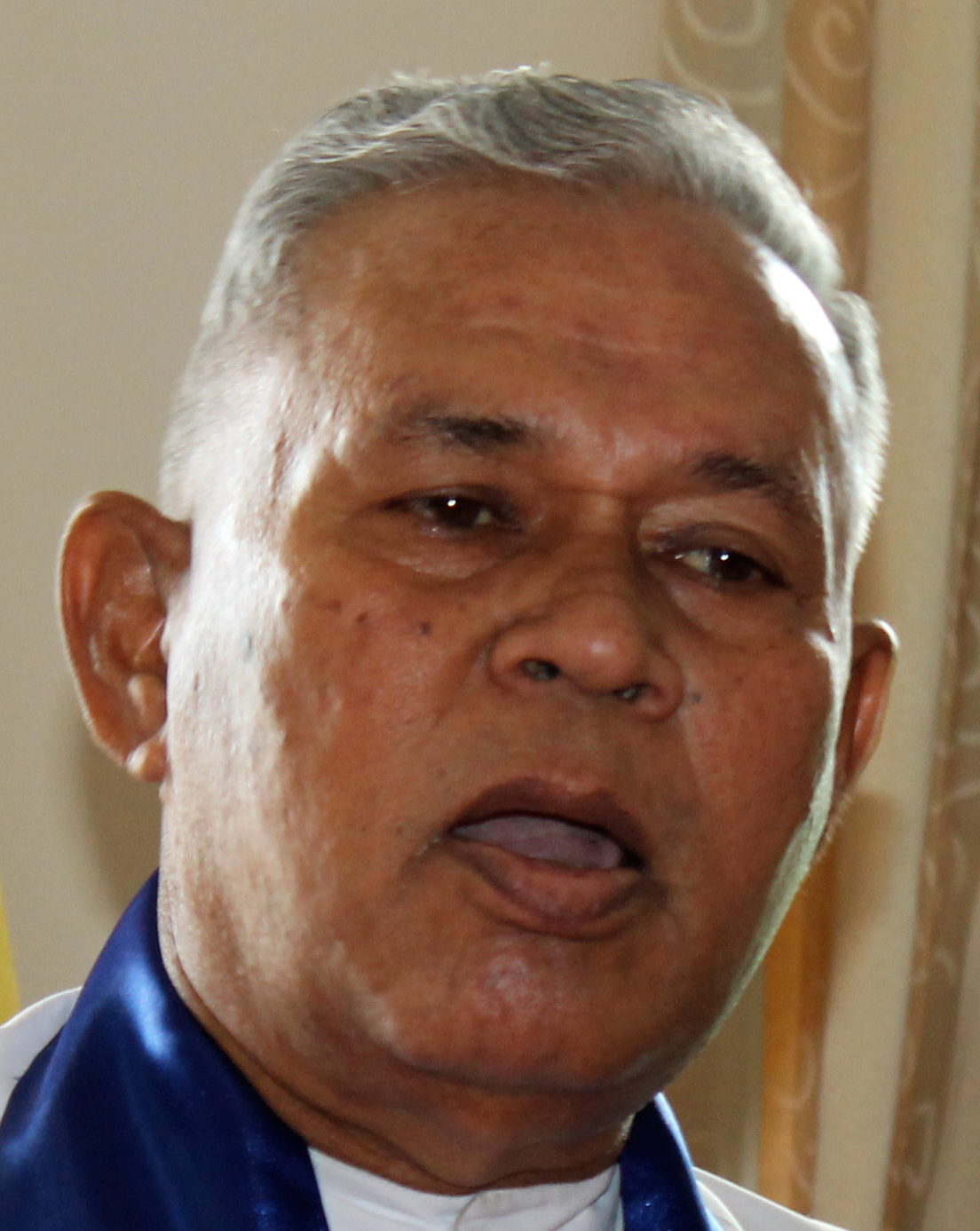
M. K. A. D. S. Gunawardana (b. 1947)

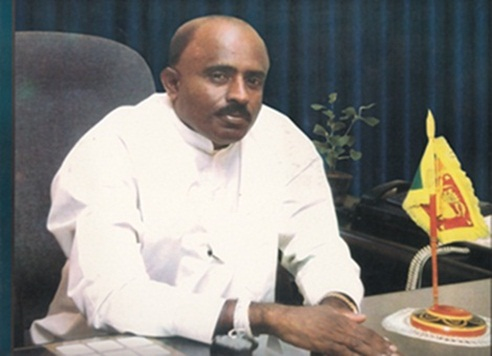
Suranimala Rajapaksha (b. 1949)

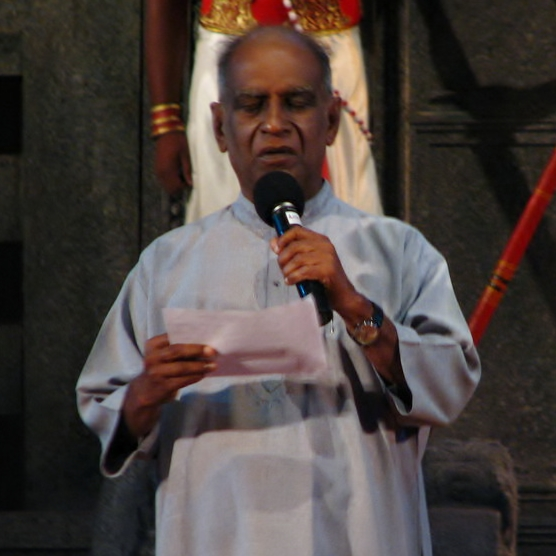
W. D. Amaradeva (b. 1927)

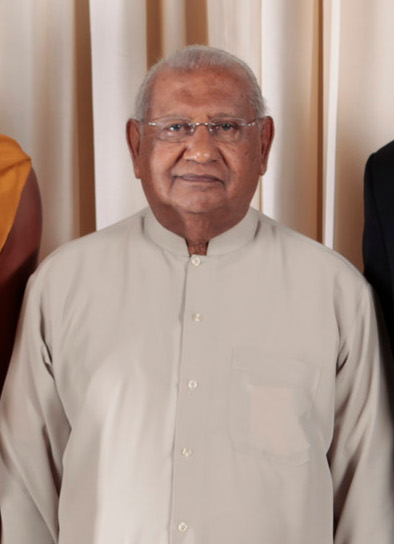
Ratnasiri Wickremanayake (b. 1933)

=== January ===
- 1 January – Ian Pieris, 82 (cricketer).
- 13 January – Sarath Silva, (actor)
- 15 January
  - Chandrasiri Kodithuwakku, 66 (actor)
  - Shantha Deshabandu, 64 (lyricist)
- 19 January – M. K. A. D. S. Gunawardana, 68 (politician).
- 20 January
  - Eileen Siriwardena, (author)
  - Athulasoma Atigala, (actor)

=== February ===
- 1 February – Susila Kuragama, 72 (actress)
- 12 February – Tissasiri Perera (musician)
- 20 February – H. D. S. Jayasekara, (musician)
- 21 February – Anton Jones, 78 (musician).
- 24 February – Dharmapala Abeywardena, (film producer)
- 27 February
  - Ajantha Ranasinghe, 74 (composer)
  - Wiswa Warnapala, 79 (politician).
- 28 February – Sengai Aaliyan, 75 (author).
- 29 February – Dotty Jayasekara (actress)

=== March ===
- 9 March – Galagama Sri Aththadassi Thera, 94 (Buddhist monk).
- 10 March – Nanda Mahawatta, (actress)
- 11 March – Prof. Susantha Mahaulpatha (author)
- 14 March
  - Surangani Ellawala, 76 (politician).
  - Suranimala Rajapaksha, 67 (politician).
- 15 March – K. A. Wijeratne, (filmmaker)
- 22 March – Tissa Udangamuwa, (actor)
- 30 March – Prasad Gunawardena, (journalist)

=== April ===
- 8 April – Albert Fernando, (singer)
- 11 April – A. R. Surendran, (lawyer).
- 12 April – Somapala Hewakapuge, (actor)
- 13 April – Ranjith Dayananda, (actor)
- 14 April – Mahinda Makalanda, (writer)
- 15 April – Sumana Saparamadu, (journalist)
- 19 April – Nalaka Adhikari, (program producer)
- 21 April – D. B. Nihalsinghe, 76 (filmmaker).
- 24 April – G. H. Stanley Perera (theater actor)
- 26 April – M. H. Mohamed, 94 (politician).

=== May ===
- 6 May – Dayaratne Ranepura, (poet)
- 9 May – Meegala Mudiyanse, (journalist)
- 15 May – Dr. Ashley Halpe, (author)
- 19 May – Wasantha Kumara Kethhena, (journalist)
- 24 May – Ishani Ranganath, (musician)

=== June ===
- 12 June – U. B. Wijekoon, 79 (politician).
- 15 June
  - Somawansa Amarasinghe, 73 (politician).
  - Alavi Moulana, 84 (politician).
- 23 June – Gamini Malwannage, (radio announcer)
- 25 June – M. S. Ananda, (musician)
- 28 June – Asoka Wanniarachchi, (journalist)
- 30 June – Dushyayantha Samarasena, 61 (journalist)

=== July ===
- 13 July – Rohana Dandeniya, (director)
- 19 July – Nimal Jayamuni, (actor)
- 22 July – Mangala Moonesinghe, 84 (politician).

=== August ===
- 1 August – Mervyn Benz, 76 (sound administrator)
- 2 August – Chinthana Jayasena, 68 (journalist)
- 8 August – Vijaya Nandasiri, 69 (dramatist).
- 10 August – Elmo Fernando, 75 (broadcaster).
- 11 August – Sri Lal Gomez, 61 (photographer)
- 12 August – Halambage Premasiri, 52 (cricket administrator)
- 15 August – Sarath de Abrew, 63 (judge).

=== September ===
- 4 September – Cyril C. Perera, 93 (translator).
- 6 September – Nauyane Ariyadhamma Mahathera, 77 (Buddhist monk).
- 22 September – Sujatha Thotawatte, (editor)

=== October ===
- 1 October – Anton Jeyanathan, 68 (politician).
- 16 October – Kaveesha Ayeshani, 23 (actress)
- 26 October – Vijaya Ramanayake, 71 (film producer)

=== November ===
- 3 November – W. D. Amaradeva, 88 (musician).
- 16 November – Siri Kularatne (filmmaker, lyricist)
- 17 November – Langani Abeydira, (author)
- 20 November – Wimal Kumara de Costa, 68 (dramatist).

=== December ===
- 7 December – Sunil Dayananda Konara, 64 (musician)
- 17 December – Anne Ranasinghe, 91 (author).
- 21 December – Nandana S. Kommalage, (photographer)
- 26 December – Milina Sumathipala, 81 (film producer)
- 27 December – Ratnasiri Wickremanayake, 83 (Former prime minister).
- 29 December – Sunil Wimalaweera (lyricist)
