= Hirunika Premachandra =

Sri Lankan politician

- හිරුණිකා ප්‍රේමචන්ද්‍ර ஹிருணிகா பிரேமச்சந்திரா

Member of Parliament for Colombo District
- In office 1 September 2015 – 3 March 2020
- Majority: 70,584 preferential votes

Member of the Western Provincial Council
- In office 2014–2015
- Majority: 139,034 preferential votes

Personal details
- Born: 14 October 1987 (age 38) Colombo, Sri Lanka
- Party: Samagi Jana Balawegaya (2020–present)
- Other political affiliations: United National Party (2015–2020); Sri Lanka Freedom Party (2014–2015)
- Spouse: Hiran Yattowita (m. 2015; sep. 2025)
- Children: 3
- Parent: Bharatha Lakshman Premachandra (father)
- Education: Visakha Vidyalaya
- Profession: Politician

Hirunika Eranjali Premachandra (Sinhala: හිරුණිකා එරංජලී ප්‍රේමචන්ද්‍ර; born 14 October 1987) better known as Hirunika Premachandra is a member of the Samagi Jana Balawegaya. She is a former Member of the Sri Lankan Parliament from the United National Party and a former member of the Western Provincial Council. Born to Bharatha Lakshman Premachandra, Hirunika was educated at Visakha Vidyalaya.

== Political career ==
Premachandra entered active politics following the assassination of her father, Bharatha Lakshman Premachandra, in October 2011 and thereafter campaigned publicly for justice for his killing. She accused UPFA politician Duminda Silva of being responsible for the incident.

In 2014, she joined the Sri Lanka Freedom Party (SLFP) and contested the Western Provincial Council election under the United People's Freedom Alliance (UPFA). She secured the highest number of preferential votes in the Colombo District and was elected to the council.

=== SLFP and Sirisena alignment (2014–2015) ===
During the split within the SLFP in 2014, Premachandra supported Maithripala Sirisena in the 2015 Sri Lankan presidential election. After Sirisena’s victory, she was appointed to the SLFP Central Committee.

=== United National Party — Member of Parliament (2015–2020) ===
Ahead of the 2015 general election, Premachandra left the SLFP in protest of former President Mahinda Rajapaksa being nominated by the UPFA. She joined the United National Party (UNP) and contested from the Colombo District under the United National Front for Good Governance (UNFGG) coalition. She was elected to Parliament in 2015. For contesting under a rival party, she was later expelled from the SLFP.

On 18 October 2017, she was appointed as the UNP organiser for Ratmalana by Prime Minister Ranil Wickremesinghe. During her parliamentary term, Premachandra was active on youth empowerment, women’s rights, and anti-corruption issues.

=== Samagi Jana Balawegaya (2020–present) ===
Following internal rifts within the UNP, Premachandra joined the Samagi Jana Balawegaya (SJB) led by Sajith Premadasa in 2020. Premachandra lost her parliamentary seat in the 2020 general election.

She remained active within the party’s women’s wing and organisational structure.

==== 2022 protests and public activism ====
Premachandra took part in the 2022 Sri Lankan protests, actively participating in demonstrations calling for accountability and the resignation of President Gotabaya Rajapaksa. Her participation led to several brief arrests during protest actions in Colombo.

She contested again in the 2024 parliamentary election from Colombo District but failed to secure a seat. On 16 October 2024, she resigned as National Organiser of the SJB’s women’s wing (Samagi Vanitha Balawegaya) to focus on her upcoming campaign while reaffirming her support for the party.

== Personal life ==
On 6 July 2015, Premachandra married model and actor Hiran Yattowita. They had three children. On 11 March 2025, she posted a message on her Facebook page stating that the couple had decided to separate.

== Electoral history ==
Provincial Elections
Year	Constituency	Party	Alliance	Votes	%	Result
2014	Western Province	Sri Lanka Freedom Party	United People's Freedom Alliance	139,034	31.37%	Elected

Parliamentary Elections
Year	Constituency	Party	Alliance	Votes	%	+/−	Result
2015	Colombo District	United National Party	UNF for Good Governance	70,584	11.01%	11.01	Elected
2020	Colombo District	Samagi Jana Balawegaya	Samagi Jana Sandhanaya	44,489	11.49%	▲0.48	Lost
2024	Colombo District	Samagi Jana Balawegaya	Samagi Jana Sandhanaya	36,139	17.35%	▲5.74	Lost

== Abduction case ==
On 21 December 2015, Premachandra was alleged to have kidnapped an aspiring model and cricketer Cheruka Weerakoon from a shop by her bodyguards and threatened to take pictures of him without his sunglasses. It is alleged that the Weerakoon was forcibly taken away in a black Defender jeep registered under Premachandra's name. The model, who was subsequently released from his enforced detention, lodged a complaint with the police giving a different narrative. The news rose out quickly in local media. Premachandra announced a press conference and denied any knowledge of this incident, claiming that she was at a function at the Colombo Municipal Council where President Maithreepala Sirisena was also in attendance. Weerakoon confirmed her presence at the said incident and some CCTV footage which showed her activity with him a few days earlier. As a result of the incident police jailed her bodyguards but not her. She has been sentenced to three years rigorous imprisonment by the Colombo High Court.

== Filmography ==
- No. denotes the Number of Sri Lankan film in the Sri Lankan cinema.

Year	No.	Film	Role
2018	1314	Udumbara	National head coach. First cinematic role

== See also ==
- List of political families in Sri Lanka
