= List of international presidential trips made by Ranil Wickremesinghe =

Ranil Wickremesinghe served as the 9th President of Sri Lanka from 21 July 2022 to 23 September 2024. This article documents all international presidential trips made by Wickremesinghe during his term in office.

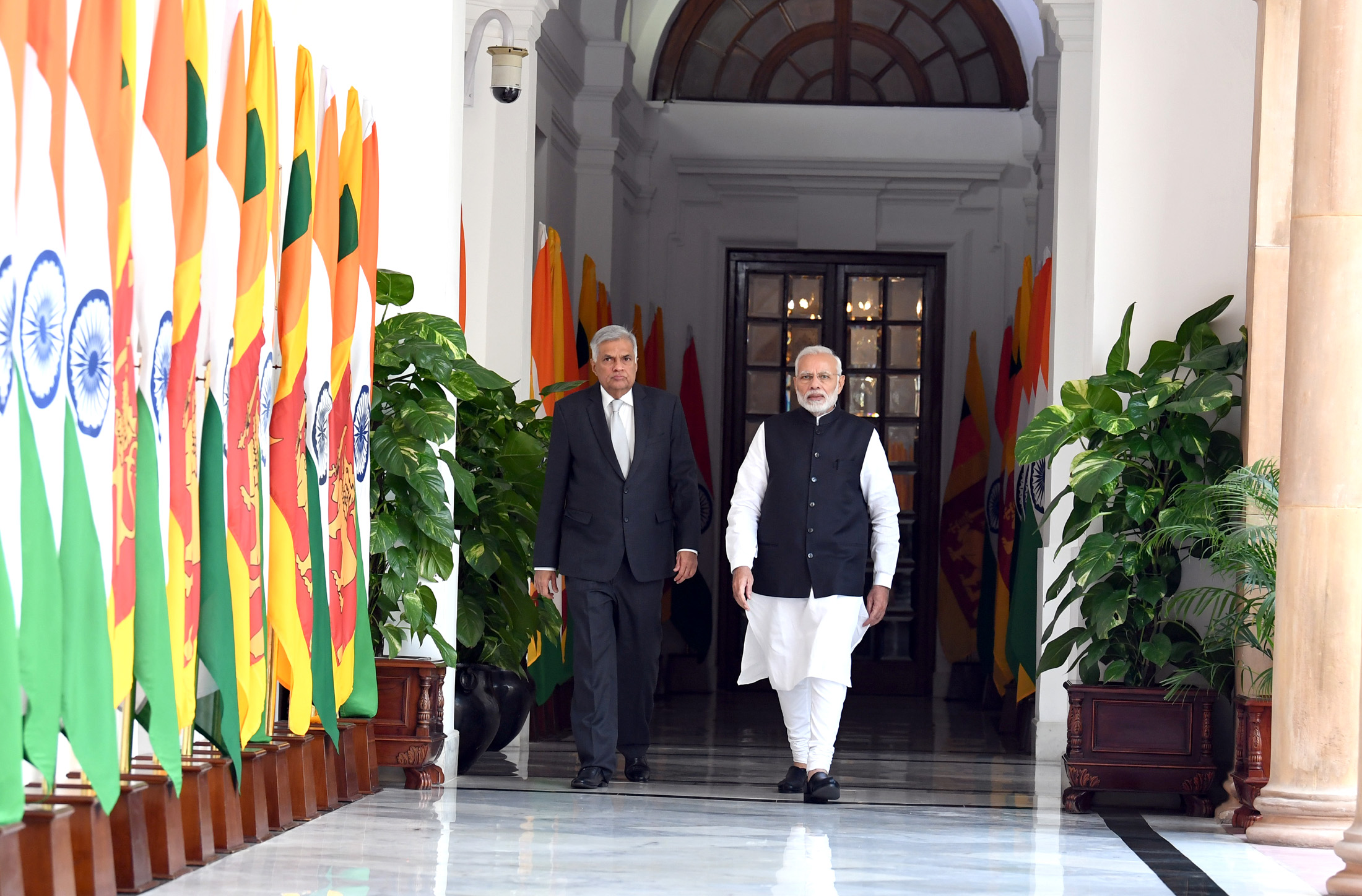
Wickremesinghe, then Prime Minister, meets with Narendra Modi in New Delhi, October 2018.

== Summary of international trips ==
During his term in office, Ranil Wickremesinghe made 16 foreign trips to 17 countries. Wickremesinghe never visited South America.

No. of visits	Country
3	United Kingdom
2	Japan, Singapore
1	Australia, China, Cuba, Egypt, France, Germany, India, Indonesia, Maldives, Philippines, Switzerland, Uganda, United Arab Emirates, United States

== 2022 ==
President Wickremesinghe, the First Lady and Sri Lankan High Commissioner to the United Kingdom Saroja Sirisena at Westminster Hall, paying their last respects to Queen Elizabeth II

	Country	Areas visited	Date(s)	Purpose(s)	Notes
1	United Kingdom	London	17–22 September	State funeral of Queen Elizabeth II	See also: Sri Lanka–United Kingdom relations Led an eight-member delegation to attend the state funeral of Queen Elizabeth II.
2	Japan	Tokyo	26–28 September	Official visit & State funeral of Shinzo Abe	See also: Japan–Sri Lanka relations Wickremesinghe traveled to Tokyo to attend the state funeral of former Japanese Prime Minister Shinzo Abe. Wickremesinghe held talks on debt restructuring with Japanese Prime Minister Fumio Kishida and was scheduled to have meetings with other leaders including Indian Prime Minister Narendra Modi and Singaporean Prime Minister Lee Hsien Loong. Wickremesinghe invited the Singaporean Prime Minister to visit Sri Lanka next year for the 75th Independence Anniversary.
2	Philippines	Manila	29–30 September	Official visit & bilateral meetings	See also: Philippines–Sri Lanka relations To attend the Asian Development Bank Governors’ meeting, where Wickremesinghe was to deliver a special address. Wickremesinghe also held talks with Philippine President Bongbong Marcos.
3	Egypt	Sharm El Sheikh	6–10 November	2022 United Nations Climate Change Conference & bilateral meetings	To attend the 2022 United Nations Climate Change Conference, where Wickremesinghe was to deliver a special address.

== 2023 ==
	Country	Areas visited	Date(s)	Purpose(s)	Notes
4	United Kingdom	London	4–7 May	Coronation of Charles III and Camilla	See also: Sri Lanka–United Kingdom relations Led an eight-member delegation to attend the coronation of Charles III and Camilla.
5	Singapore	Singapore	23 May	State visit	Official visit on the invitation of Singaporean Prime Minister Lee Hsien Loong.
5	Japan	Tokyo	23–26 May	State visit	See also: Japan–Sri Lanka relations Official visit on the invitation on the Japanese Prime Minister Fumio Kishida.
6	United Kingdom	London	17–21 June	40th Meeting of the International Democrat Union	No meeting with UK officials, attended the meeting of the International Democrat Union, and met the head of the Commonwealth.
6	France	Paris	22–23 June	1st Meeting of the New Global Finance Pact	World leaders attended a finance pact meeting in Paris.
7	India	New Delhi	20–21 July	State visit	See also: Sri Lanka–India relations Met with Indian President Ram Nath Kovind, Indian Prime Minister Narendra Modi and other Indian delegates.
8	Singapore	Singapore	20–21 August	State visit	Met with the Singaporean President Halimah Yacob, Singaporean Prime Minister Lee Hsien Loong and other Singapore delegates.
9	Cuba	Havana	15–16 September	G77 summit	Met Cuban President Miguel Díaz-Canel and addressed the G77 summit.
9	United States	New York City	18–24 September	UN General Assembly	Addressed the UN general assembly and met the leaders of Iran, Bangladesh, Nepal, South Korea and many other nations.
10	Germany	Berlin	26–29 September	State visit	See also: Germany–Sri Lanka relations Met German Chancellor Olaf Scholz and addressed the Berlin Global Dialog.
11	China	Beijing	15–18 October	State visit	See also: China–Sri Lanka relations Met Chinese President Xi Jinping and attended the Belt and Road Forum.
12	Maldives	Malé	17–18 November	State visit & Inauguration of Mohamed Muizzu	See also: Maldives–Sri Lanka relations Met outgoing Maldivian President Ibrahim Mohamed Solih and Maldivian President-elect Mohamed Muizzu and attended the inauguration of new president.
13	United Arab Emirates	Dubai	30 November–4 December	2023 United Nations Climate Change Conference & bilateral meetings	To attend the 2023 United Nations Climate Change Conference, where Wickremesinghe was to deliver a special address. Met with Indian Prime Minister Narendra Modi and Greek Prime Minister Kyriakos Mitsotakis.

== 2024 ==
	Country	Areas visited	Date(s)	Purpose(s)	Notes
14	Switzerland	Davos	13–18 January	World Economic Forum	To attend the annual meeting of the World Economic Forum.
14	Uganda	Kampala	18–23 January	19th Summit of the Non-Aligned Movement & 3rd South Summit of the Group of 77 and China	To attend the 19th Summit of the Non-Aligned Movement and the 3rd South Summit of the Group of 77 and China. Met with Ugandan President Yoweri Museveni.
15	Australia	Perth	8–10 February	Indian Ocean Summit	To attend the annual meeting of the Indian Ocean Summit. Wickremesinghe was the only head of state in attendance alongside foreign ministers of other nations.
16	Indonesia	Bali	19–21 May	10th Summit of the World Water Forum	To attend the annual meeting of the World Water Forum in Bali. Met with Indonesian President Joko Widodo and SpaceX CEO Elon Musk.

== Multilateral meetings participated in by Wickremesinghe ==
Group	Year		
Group	2022	2023	2024
ACD			
CHOGM			
G-15			
NAM			15–19 January, Kampala
SCO			
COP	6–10 November, Sharm El Sheikh	30 November–13 December, Dubai	
SAARC			
Others			
██ = Did not attend; ██ = Future event
