= Cyril Perera =

Cyril Perera may refer to:

- Cyril C. Perera (1923–2016), Sri Lankan author of Sinhala literature
- Cyril E. S. Perera (1892–1968), Sri Lankan politician
