= Murder of Seya Sadewmi =

2015 Sri Lankan child rape and murder

Seya Sadewmi
- Born: 16 September 2010
- Died: 12 September 2015 (aged 4); Kotadeniyawa, Gampaha District, Sri Lanka
- Body discovered: 13 September 2015

Seya Sadewmi (16 September 2010 – 12 September 2015), was a four-year-old Sri Lankan child who was abducted, raped and murdered. The girl went missing from her house on 12 September 2015 while sleeping with her mother. After an extensive search of the premises by the police K9 unit, the naked body was discovered on the morning of 13 September 2015 near a canal. The body was found 200 meters away from the house. An autopsy revealed that Sadewmi had been sexually assaulted and was strangled to death. Four arrests were made by the Kotadeniyawa police, and two of them were later exonerated after a DNA testing. Third suspect, Dinesh Priyashantha subsequently confessed to the crime. Later he revealed that his brother, Saman Jayalath, manipulated him into confessing. Once arrested, Jayalath concurred with Priysantha's allegations and was detained for further investigations.

A subsequent DNA test revealed that Jayalath's DNA samples match with those found at the crime scene, and he was indicted on four charges. On March 15, 2016, the Negombo High Court found Jayalath guilty on all charges and sentenced him to death.

== Incident ==
Prior to disappearance, Sadewmi was last seen around 8.30pm on 12 September 2015. According to her parents, she was sleeping with her mother at the time, and her father was not home. When he returned home and asked where the girl was, her mother told him that she might have gone to sleep in her grandmother's bed. This was not uncommon for her to do. They both decided not to investigate this before going back to sleep. She was reported missing the next morning and the Kotadeniyawa police called in for an investigation. The police K9 unit and Criminal Investigation Department (CID) later joined the search. It was reported that her clothes were found on the bed where she slept, which rendered K9 unit unable to trace her scent. The police speculated that she may have been abducted while sleeping with the mother. In the evening, Sadewmi's body was found near a canal 200 meters from her home. According to news reports, the body was naked and a piece of clothe was wrapped around the neck.

== Investigation ==
=== Wrongful arrests ===
After the investigation was handed over to the CID by the Inspector-general of police (IGP), Kotadeniyawa police arrested two individuals including a 17-years-old student, under reasonable suspicions. However, they were later exonerated as their DNA samples didn't match those recovered from the crime scene. They alleged that the police officers assaulted and tortured them while in custody; Kotadeniyawa police denied these allegations. Police Chief later ordered an inquiry into alleged human rights violations of the two suspects.

=== Third and fourth arrests ===
A third suspect, an individual named Dinesh Priyashantha was arrested by the police under suspicions of connection to the murder. After the first two suspects were exonerated, Priyashantha confessed to the murder of Sadewmi. However, he later retracted his confession and claimed that his brother, Saman Jayalath, manipulated him into a false confession. After being detained, Jayalath concurred with Priyashantha's allegations. Subsequent DNA testing revealed that Priyashantha's DNA samples do not match with those from the crime scene.

== Sentencing ==
It was later proven by The Genetech Molecular Diagnostics Research Institute (GMDRI) that Jayalath's DNA sample match with those found at the crime scene. On March 15, 2016, the Negombo High Court found Jayalath guilty on all charges and sentenced him to death.

== See also ==
- Murder of S. Vithiya
