= Murder of S. Vithiya =

Murder of a Sri Lankan schoolgirl

S. Vithiya
- Born: 25 November 1996; Mankulam, Sri Lanka
- Died: 13 May 2015 (aged 18); Pungudutivu, Sri Lanka
- Known for: Murder victim

Sivaloganathan Vithiya (25 November 1996 – 13 May 2015) was an 18 year old Sri Lankan Tamil schoolgirl who was gang raped and murdered on the island of Pungudutivu in northern Sri Lanka in May 2015.

== Background ==
Vithiya's family were displaced from Pungudutivu in 1990 as a result of the Sri Lankan Civil War and later ended up in Mallavi near Mankulam in the Vanni region. Vithiya was born on 25 November 1996 at the government hospital in Mankulam. She attended Nallaru Vidyalayam until grade 6.

During the final months of the civil war in 2009 Vithiya was studying in Colombo but her family, who were still in the Vanni, were caught in the brutal fighting and ended up in the Menik Farm internment camps. Vithiya and her family relocated to their native village in Pungudutivu in 2010. Vithiya was a pupil at Pungudutivu Maha Vidyalayam studying Advanced Level.

The islands off Jaffna Peninsula, including Pungudutivu, had been under the control of the Sri Lanka Navy since 1990. During this time the islands became notorious for numerous cases of rape and murder, most of which were blamed on the navy and the government backed Eelam People's Democratic Party paramilitary group. High-profile cases included the rape/murder of Sarathambal (1999), the rape/murder of Ilayathambi Tharsini (2005) and the Allaipiddy massacre (2006).

== Incident ==
Vithiya usually went to school, which was about 2 km from her home, by bicycle along with two other girls who lived close by. However, on the morning of 13 May 2015, the two girls were ill and Vithiya's brother Nishanthan, who would otherwise have taken her to school on his motorcycle, had gone out. Vithiya left for school alone on her bicycle at 7.25am.

School finishes at 2.00pm and normally Vithiya would be home by 3.00pm. When she failed to return home after school her mother Saraswathy and Nishanthan went to her school where they were told that she had not been school that day. A relative of the family who runs a boutique near the school also told them that he had not seen her that day. At 6.00pm Vithiya's family went to the police checkpoint at Kurikattavan, Pungudutivu to report her missing but according to Nishanthan and local residents the police weren't interested, instead making derogatory remarks about Vithiya insinuating that she had eloped with a lover. At 6.30 pm the family went to the police in Kayts, Velanaitivu to lodge a complaint about Vithiya's disappearance but it was not until 9.00pm that a female police officer took their complaint.

The family returned home but as the police weren't searching for Vithiya they, along with other villagers, started searching for her. The villagers resumed the search at 5.00am. A group including Nishanthan and the family's two dogs were searching along an isolated road about 1½km from Vithiya's home when the dogs started barking. Vithiya's bicycle was lying on the ground and one of the dogs found her shoes. Nishanthan discovered Vithiya's body in an isolated spot by a dilapidated building. She was barely clothed, her hands were bound behind her with her school tie, her mouth was gagged with a piece of cloth and her legs were spread apart and tied to two separate trees. Her school bag was nearby. Nishanthan called the police in Kayts at around 7.00am but they failed to arrive prompting Nishanthan to contact the police in Colombo using the 119 emergency telephone number. The police eventually arrived at the scene at 11.00am.

Vithiya's funeral, which took place on 15 May 2015 at Manakkadu Cemetery, was attended by hundreds of people including local politicians. Her family have decided to move to Vavuniya where they have relatives and Vithiya's sister Nishanthini is studying at the Faculty of Business Studies, University of Jaffna.

== Investigation ==
Three brothers, in their thirties and forties, were arrested on 15 May 2015. They had apparently been in a long running feud with Vithiya's family. According to the police Vithiya had been abducted as she went to school on the morning of 13 May 2015.

Five youths from Colombo were arrested in Poorikkattuvan on 17 May 2015. They had gone from Colombo to Pungudutivu on 13 May 2015 but later returned to Colombo, only to return to Pungudutivu for Vithiya's funeral. After the funeral they tried to return to Colombo but were arrested by the police.

A ninth suspect, Mahalingam Sasikumar or Swiss Kumar, was caught by villagers in Pungudutivu. He was admitted to Jaffna Hospital but managed to escape to Colombo in an attempt to flee to Switzerland. He was however arrested at a guest house in Wellawatte, Colombo on 18 May 2015. It has been alleged that Sasikumar filmed the gang rape.

Several senior police officers involved in the investigation were subsequently transferred. The police investigation was taken over by the Criminal Investigation Department.

== Prosecution ==
Poobalasingham Indrakumar alias Sinnappa, Poobalasingham Jeyakumar alias Ravi, Poobalasingham Navakumar alias Sendil, Mahalingam Shashidaren alias Shashi, Pillainandan Chandrakasan alias Chandra, Shivaderan Kushange alias Periyathamby, Palani Rubasingham Kuganathan alias Nishanthan, Jeyadaran Kokilan alias Kanna and Mahalingam Shashikumar alias Swiss Kumar were convicted and sentenced to death by the Jaffna High Court while Poobalasingham Indrakumar alias Sinnappa and Palani Rubasingham Kuganathan alias Nishanthan were acquitted due to insufficient evidence.

== Protests ==
The murder prompted widespread anger and demonstrations across the country, particularly in northern Sri Lanka. School pupils in Pungudutivu staged protests on 14 May 2015. Local residents on the island blockaded roads with logs and burning tyres. There were also protests in Kilinochchi, Mullaitivu and the University of Jaffna.

When eight of the suspects were brought to Jaffna Courts on 20 May 2015, a tense situation arose and stones were pelted at the courts as the protesters demanded that the suspects be handed over to them. The police were forced to use tear gas to disperse the protesters. 127 protesters were arrested. During the protest a Sinhalese police officer was heard blaming the protesters for the rape/murder, saying "You should make sure that your men behave".

A hartal was observed in northern Sri Lanka on 20/21 May 2015 as a protest against the murder. Shops, businesses, private transport and even government offices were shut across the Northern Province. On 23 May 2015, Jaffna Magistrate’s Court banned protests within the city limits of Jaffna.

== Subsequent events ==
One of the convicts J.Kokilan Kanna attempted to sexually assault a female doctor while being treated in the prison hospital in 2026 and was restrained by prison officials.

== See also ==
- Murder of K. Tharshan
- Murder of Seya Sadewmi
