= Financial Crimes Investigation Division =

Sri Lanka law enforcement unit

- මූල්‍ය අපරාධ විමර්ශන අංශය (Sinhala) நிதி குற்றம் புலனாய்வு பிரிவு (Tamil)
- Active: February 26, 2015; 11 years ago
- Country: Sri Lanka
- Agency: Sri Lanka Police
- Headquarters: Central Point Building, Chatham street, Colombo 01
- Motto: Righteously protect those who abide the Law
- Abbreviation: FCID

The Financial Crimes Investigation Division (FCID) (Sinhala: මූල්‍ය අපරාධ විමර්ශන අංශය) (Tamil: நிதி குற்றம் புலனாய்வு பிரிவு) is a law enforcement unit of the Sri Lanka Police tasked with investigating financial crimes.

== Overview ==
FCID was established by Minister of Public Order and Christian Affairs John Amaratunga on 26 February 2015 under the instructions from the Prime Minister Ranil Wickremesinghe and it is headed by the DIG Ravi Waidyalankara.

Financial Crimes Investigation Division is directly accountable for carrying out investigations throughout the island into serious financial fraud, misuse of state assets or funds, cases of a nature that require intellectual skills and complex detection. At times, the FCID carries out investigations pertaining to Government revenue. The FCID agencies are highly skilled in encountering the Major Financial Crimes, Frauds, Unsolicited Mega Projects, Major Financial Crimes against Public Property, Money Laundering, Terrorist financing and financial transaction, Illegal financial Transaction, Unlawful enrichments, and Offences on Financial Crimes against National Security.

The FCID has utmost powers to arrest civilians, government workers and legislator from anywhere in Sri Lanka without getting approval from Attorney General or DIG of this unit. The suspect can be remanded by a Magistrate Court until further hearings.

== History ==
The Financial Crimes Investigation Division was formed on 26 February 2015 under the purview of Sri Lanka Police Service.

FCID is directly responsible in handling the investigations on the corruption charges against the Rajapaksa Administration and the public service that involved in large-scale corruption which led to destabilize the Government revenue. However there was number of complaints against several high profile ministers of the Sirisena cabinet also.

FCID has also arrested several high profile ministers of Rajapaksa Administration including former Economy Development Minister Basil Rajapaksa.

The FCID also received training from UK's Serious Fraud Office after the Sri Lankan government requested international assistance against corruption in 2015.

In 2017 July, President Maithripala Sirisena expressed his disapproval on the FCID activities over investigations carried out against his cabinet members Minister A.H.M. Fowzi using a car belonging to another ministry and appointment given to his daughter by former state minister Priyankara Jayaratne. It is also revealed that government spends Rs.1.2 million monthly to maintain the FCID.

== Notable Arrests ==
Status	Suspect Name	Charge(s)	Date of Arrest	Occupation	Reference
In Custody _{Bail granted through High Court}	Basil Rajapaksa	Misappropriation of construction of public housing funds	22 April 2015	Former Minister of Economy Development	
Released on Bail	Johnston Fernando	Charged on looting Lanka Sathosa goods	5 May 2015	Former Minister of Co-operatives & Internal Trade	
In Custody	Nihal Jayatilake	Misappropriation of construction of public housing funds	22 April 2015	Former Secretary of Economy Development	
In Custody	R. R. K. Ranawaka	Misappropriation of construction of public housing funds	22 April 2015	Former Director General of Divineguma	
In Custody	Saliya Wickramasuriya	Misappropriation of Tsunami funds	9 May 2015	Former Chief Operating Officer of the Reconstruction and Development Agency	
