= Ian Pieris =

Sri Lankan cricketer (1933–2016)

Personal information
- Full name: Percival Ian Pieris
- Born: 14 March 1933; Colombo, British Ceylon
- Died: 1 January 2016 (aged 82); Colombo, Sri Lanka

Ian Pieris (14 March 1933 – 1 January 2016) was a Sri Lankan first-class cricketer and a former president of Sri Lanka Cricket.

== Education ==
Pieris was educated at S. Thomas' College, Mount Lavinia and then read economics at Queens' College, Cambridge, matriculating in 1955. Whilst in Cambridge he played cricket for the Cambridge University Cricket Club.
