= Ranil Wickremesinghe =

President of Sri Lanka from 2022 to 2024

- රනිල් වික්‍රමසිංහ ரணில் விக்கிரமசிங்க
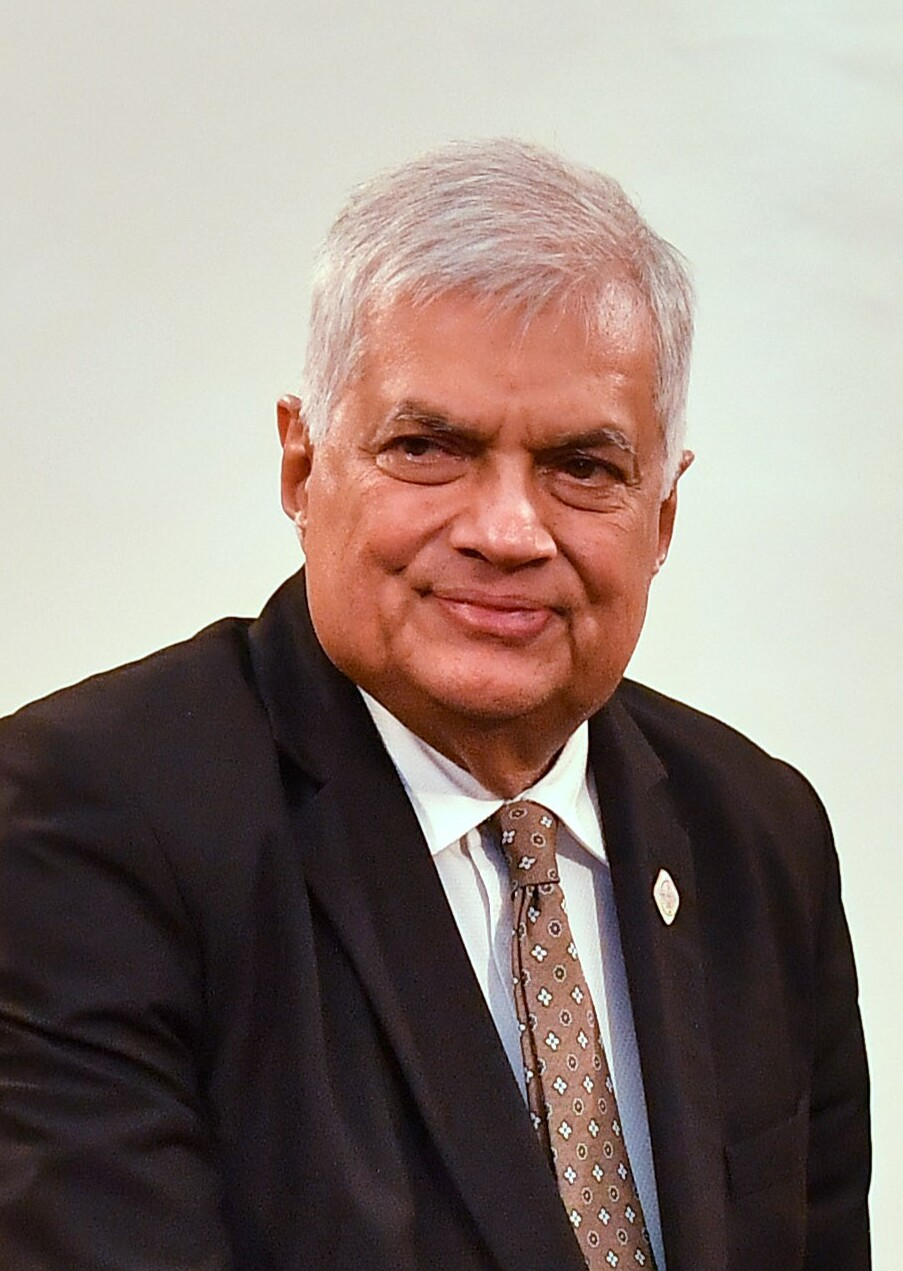
- Wickremesinghe in 2024

9th President of Sri Lanka
- In office 21 July 2022 – 23 September 2024; Acting: 14–21 July 2022
- Prime Minister: Dinesh Gunawardena
- Preceded by: Gotabaya Rajapaksa
- Succeeded by: Anura Kumara Dissanayake

13th Prime Minister of Sri Lanka
- In office 12 May 2022 – 21 July 2022
- President: Gotabaya Rajapaksa; Himself (acting)
- Preceded by: Mahinda Rajapaksa
- Succeeded by: Dinesh Gunawardena
- In office 15 December 2018 – 21 November 2019
- President: Maithripala Sirisena
- Preceded by: Mahinda Rajapaksa
- Succeeded by: Mahinda Rajapaksa
- In office 9 January 2015 – 26 October 2018
- President: Maithripala Sirisena
- Preceded by: D. M. Jayaratne
- Succeeded by: Mahinda Rajapaksa
- In office 9 December 2001 – 6 April 2004
- President: Chandrika Kumaratunga
- Preceded by: Ratnasiri Wickremanayake
- Succeeded by: Mahinda Rajapaksa
- In office 7 May 1993 – 18 August 1994
- President: Dingiri Banda Wijetunga
- Preceded by: Dingiri Banda Wijetunga
- Succeeded by: Chandrika Kumaratunga

10th Leader of the Opposition
- In office 22 April 2004 – 9 January 2015
- Prime Minister: Mahinda Rajapaksa; Ratnasiri Wickremanayake; D. M. Jayaratne
- Preceded by: Mahinda Rajapaksa
- Succeeded by: Nimal Siripala de Silva
- In office 28 October 1994 – 10 October 2001
- Prime Minister: Sirimavo Bandaranaike; Ratnasiri Wickremanayake
- Preceded by: Gamini Dissanayake
- Succeeded by: Ratnasiri Wickremanayake

Ministerial roles
- 2022–2024: Minister of Defence; Minister of Technology; Minister of Finance; Ministry of Women, Child Affairs and Social Empowerment
- 2015–2019: Minister of National Policies and Economic Affairs
- 1989–1993: Minister of Industry; Leader of the House
- 1980–1989: Minister of Education
- 1977–1980: Minister of Youth Affairs & Employment
- 1977: Deputy Minister of Foreign Affairs

Member of Parliament for National List
- In office 23 June 2021 – 21 July 2022

Member of Parliament for Colombo District
- In office 16 August 1994 – 3 March 2020

Member of Parliament for Gampaha District
- In office 15 February 1989 – 16 August 1994

Personal details
- Born: 24 March 1949 (age 77) Colombo, Dominion of Ceylon
- Party: United National Party
- Other political affiliations: New Democratic Front (since 2024)
- Spouse: Maithree Wickremesinghe (m. 1994)
- Parents: Esmond Wickremesinghe; Nalini Wickremesinghe
- Relatives: Wijewardene family
- Education: Royal College, Colombo; University of Ceylon
- Occupation: Lawyer; Politician

Ranil Wickremesinghe (Sinhala: රනිල් වික්‍රමසිංහ; Tamil: ரணில் விக்கிரமசிங்க; born 24 March 1949) is a Sri Lankan politician who served as the ninth president of Sri Lanka from 2022 to 2024. He has also served as Prime Minister of Sri Lanka from 1993–1994, 2001–2004, 2015–2018, 2018-2019 and in 2022. Wickremesinghe has held several ministerial roles, including Minister of Finance, Minister of Defence, Minister of Technology and Minister of Women, Child Affairs and Social Empowerment. Wickremesinghe has led the United National Party (UNP) since 1994. He is also the eighth executive president of Sri Lanka, a role established by the 1977 constitutional amendment that expanded presidential powers.

Born into a political family, Wickremesinghe graduated from the University of Ceylon and qualified as a lawyer from the Ceylon Law College in 1972. He entered politics in the mid-1970s with the UNP, first being elected to Parliament in 1977. Over the years, he held various ministerial positions, including Minister of Foreign Affairs, Youth Affairs and Employment, and Industry, Science and Technology. He first became prime minister in 1993 following the assassination of President Ranasinghe Premadasa.

Wickremesinghe ran for president as the UNP candidate in 1999 and 2005, but was defeated both times. In 2015, he was appointed prime minister by president Maithripala Sirisena, leading a national unity government until 2019. During his tenure, he was controversially sacked by Sirisena in 2018, triggering a constitutional crisis, but was reappointed prime minister after the Supreme Court declared his sacking as unconstitutional. He lost his parliamentary seat in 2020 but re-entered parliament in 2021 as a National List MP.

In May 2022, Wickremesinghe was appointed prime minister by president Gotabaya Rajapaksa amidst the then-ongoing political crisis. Following Rajapaksa's resignation in July 2022, Wickremesinghe assumed the presidency in an acting capacity and was subsequently elected as the 9th president and the 8th executive president of Sri Lanka by parliament on 20 July 2022. He took office the following day. He attempted to run for a full term in his own right in 2024 but failed to win reelection, finishing in third place with 17.27% of the vote.

== Early life and education ==
Born on 24 March 1949 in Colombo, Wickremesinghe was the second son of Esmond Wickremesinghe and Nalini Wickremesinghe née Wijewardena. His father was a lawyer who became a press baron taking over the Lake House Group of newspapers. His grandfathers were Cyril Wickremesinghe of the Ceylon Civil Service and the press baron, D. R. Wijewardhena.

Wickremesinghe was educated at the Royal Preparatory School and at the Royal College, Colombo where he was a classmate and friend of Anura Bandaranaike, son of then Prime Minister S. W. R. D. Bandaranaike; and Dinesh Gunawardena, son of socialist leader Philip Gunawardena. Wickremesinghe entered the Faculty of Law of the University of Ceylon at its Colombo Campus which is now the University of Colombo. After graduation, he completed the law exams at the Ceylon Law College and took oaths as an advocate in 1972 after having apprenticed under H. W. Jayewardene, QC. He became an Attorney at law following the changes to the legal profession in 1973. Wickremesinghe received an honorary doctorate from Deakin University in Australia on 14 February 2017 for his significant contributions in reforms in economy, education and human rights.

== Political career ==
Wickremesinghe joined the United National Party (UNP) and progressed through its ranks. He was appointed the chief organizer of the Kelaniya Electorate in the mid-1970s, and was later appointed the chief organizer of the Biyagama Electorate, which he won in the 1977 parliamentary elections and entered parliament. He was appointed Deputy Minister of Foreign Affairs in the new government of J. R. Jayewardene, and was soon promoted to the post of Minister of Youth Affairs & Employment on 5 October 1977, which made him the youngest cabinet minister of Sri Lanka. During his term as minister, he initiated the Sri Lanka National Guard and the National Youth Services Council (NYSCO), which provides vocational and career training to school leavers. Wickremesinghe was later made the Minister of Education on 14 February 1980.

Under the presidency of Ranasinghe Premadasa, Wickremesinghe was appointed the Minister of Industry on 18 February 1989, under which he initiated industrial reforms and established the Biyagama Special Economic Zone. In 1990, he was given the additional portfolios of Science and Technology. Wickremesinghe had competition from his senior colleagues in the UNP, Lalith Athulathmudali and Gamini Dissanayake, who had been rivals of President Premadasa. He was appointed Leader of the House in 1989.

=== First premiership (1993–1994) ===
On 7 May 1993, Wickremesinghe was sworn in as prime minister after President Ranasinghe Premadasa was assassinated by the Tamil Tigers and Prime Minister D. B. Wijetunga was appointed president. During his ephemeral term, he was credited with pushing the country through an impressive economic transformation and was generally backed by the business community.

=== Opposition (1994–2001) ===
In the 1994 parliamentary elections, the UNP lost to Chandrika Kumaratunga's People's Alliance (PA), and Kumaratunga was appointed Prime Minister of the country. Wickremesinghe was defeated in the race for Opposition Leader by two votes by fellow UNP member Gamini Dissanayake, who had re-joined the party. This gave Gamini Dissanayake the default leadership of the party and made him the presidential nominee of the UNP. The UNP was progressing well under Gamini Dissanayake's leadership when he too was assassinated by the Tamil Tigers. Gamini Dissanayake's widow, Srima Dissanayake replaced him as the candidate of the UNP in the 1994 election. Securing just 35% of the vote, she lost to Chandrika Kumaratunga in every electorate except Mahiyangana. Afterwards, Wickremesinghe was appointed the opposition leader as well as the UNP leader.

Wickremesinghe was seen as a cooperative opposition leader who gave the government a chance to carry out its agenda in its early days.

==== 1999 presidential election ====
In the 1999 presidential election, Wickremesinghe was nominated as the UNP presidential candidate. After a tense election campaign in the wake of the violent North Western Provincial Council election, the Tamil Tigers carried out a suicide bomb attack in an election campaign rally, in which President Kumaratunga lost her right eye. Voting was held two days later on 21 December 1999 and amidst a wave of sympathy, Kumaratunga was re-elected to a second term with 51% of the popular vote. After this electoral loss, Wickremesinghe unsuccessfully led his party in the 2000 parliamentary elections, again losing out to the PA.

=== Second premiership (2001–2004) ===
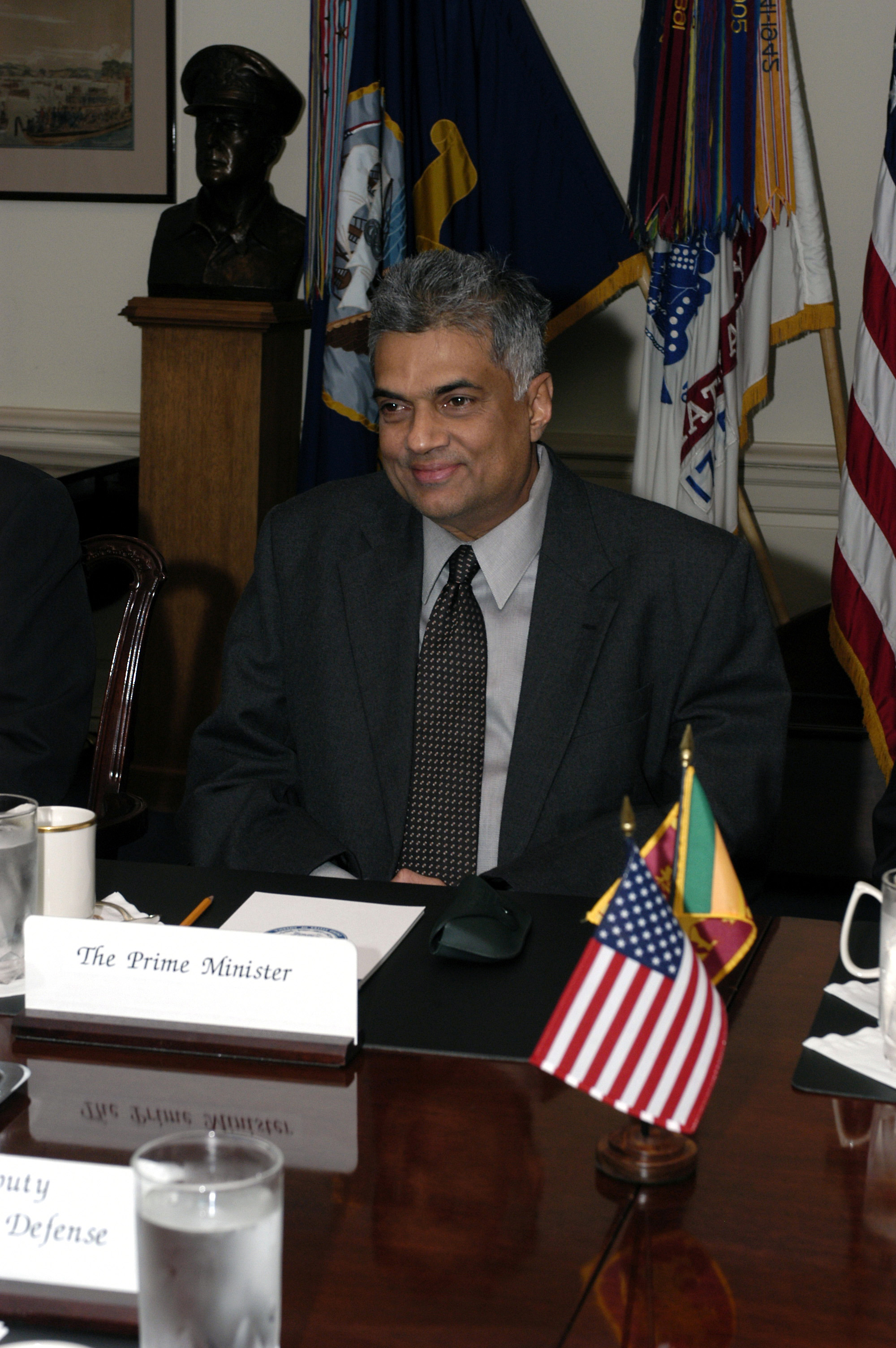
Prime Minister Ranil Wickremesinghe of Sri Lanka meets with Deputy Secretary of Defense Paul Wolfowitz in The Pentagon on 3 November 2003. The leaders are meeting to discuss defence issues of mutual interest.

In the 2001 parliamentary elections, Wickremesinghe led the newly formed United National Front (UNF) to victory, winning 109 seats compared to the PA's 77 seats. Consequently, Wickremesinghe was able to form a new UNF government and sworn as the 17th Prime Minister of Sri Lanka on 9 December 2001. Chandrika Kumaratunga still remained the president of the country. This led to a confusing situation where the president and the prime minister were from two opposing parties. Although, according to the constitution, the president was both head of state and head of government, Wickremesinghe was able to appoint his own cabinet and he had the actual control over the government. President Chandrika Kumaratunga also chaired cabinet meetings as de facto head, but her influence over decision making was strictly limited.

During his second premiership, Wickremesinghe proposed to initiate the "Western Region Megapolis" project. Planned with the assistance of architects and town planners of a Singaporean firm CESMA, it proposed to build a large new city in the western province that can rival major cities in the world. However, the project did not proceed after the end of his government. He also requested the international community to assist in development during the ceasefire – the Tokyo Donor Conference on Reconstruction and Development of Sri Lanka was held in June 2003, during which Sri Lanka received more than 4.5 billion dollars in reconstruction and development aid.

Wickremesinghe's foreign policy during his tenure as prime minister pushed closer relations with the West. He expected their economic backing to overcome the economic crisis. He also largely took assistance, especially from Norway, to resolve the ongoing ethnic conflict in Sri Lanka. In July 2002 he was able to meet United States President George W. Bush. It was the first time a Sri Lankan leader met the US president in the White House in 18 years. This visit was primarily focused on building new relationships based on economical links between United States and Sri Lanka. Furthermore, the US government pledged to support his peace efforts with LTTE. He also met the British Prime Minister Tony Blair, Japanese Prime Minister Junichiro Koizumi and Indian Prime Minister Atal Bihari Vajpayee. In September 2003, Wickremesinghe made his first official visit to Malaysia since taking office as prime minister. Over his two-day visit, he met with Malaysian Prime Minister Mahathir Mohamad in Putrajaya and urged Malaysian investors to explore opportunities in tourism, infrastructure, and agriculture. He also reassured them about the positive developments in the peace process.

==== Peace talks ====
Wickremesinghe believed a political solution based on a United Sri Lanka was the permanent solution to the civil war in the country. He also believed that such a solution could be reached through a peaceful negotiation process with LTTE. Three months after the election, Wickremesinghe's government entered a ceasefire agreement (CFA) with LTTE. The agreement was signed on 22 February 2002 at different locations in the war zone by both parties and the Norwegian Ambassador to Sri Lanka Jon Westborg acted as the facilitator. It was said that the main objective of this agreement was to find a negotiated solution to the ongoing ethnic conflict in Sri Lanka. Both parties agreed to halt all offensive military operations. An international monitoring mission called the Sri Lanka Monitoring Mission (SLMM) was formed to inquire into any instance of violation of the terms and conditions of this agreement. In the aftermath of signing the CFA, the island was deemed a safe place once again, after decades of war. The tourism industry in particular experienced a significant escalation where the number of tourists arriving in the country was suddenly increased. The A9 Highway was reopened up to Kilinochchi on 15 February 2002 after 18 years.

After signing the CFA, Wickremesinghe held a few rounds of peace talks with LTTE between 2002 and 2003. Prof. G. L. Peiris, minister Milinda Moragoda and minister Rauff Hakeem led the government delegation and LTTE theoretician Anton Balasingham, LTTE political wing leader S.P. Thamilselvan and military leader Karuna Amman led the LTTE faction during the peace talks. The Norwegian government acted as the chief facilitator during the peace talks. There were six rounds of peace talks which were held at different locations around the world:

1. 16–18 September 2002, Bangkok
2. 31 October-3 November 2002, Bangkok
3. 2–5 December 2002, Oslo
4. 6–9 January 2003, Bangkok
5. 7–8 February 2003, Berlin
6. 18–21 March 2003, Tokyo

After the Oslo round of peace talks in December 2003, a concluding statement was declared by the Norwegian facilitators which later became known as the Oslo Declaration. In this statement, it was stated that "both parties have decided to explore a political solution founded on internal self-determination based on a federal structure within a united Sri Lanka". This was considered one of the most significant incidents in the history of finding a political solution to the ethnic problem in Sri Lanka.

After the sixth round of peace talks in March 2003, the LTTE abruptly withdrew from the peace talks. In October 2003, the LTTE again showed some intentions of entering into the peace process, calling for an Interim Self Governing Authority (ISGA). The proposal was handed over to the government through Norwegian Ambassador Hans Brattskar.

Analysts saw Wickremesinghe was fanning the internecine feuds among the Tigers and systematically weakening them and a foreign policy intended to tighten the global dragnet against the LTTE. Agreements were signed with the US which allowed Sri Lanka to get assistance in terms of military training, military technology, intelligence, special training in counterterrorism and direct monetary assistance for military development. During the ceasefire period, the United States Pacific Command assessment team conducted a study from 12 September to 24 October 2002, which made several recommendations to strengthen the capabilities of the Sri Lanka Army, Sri Lanka Navy and Sri Lanka Air Force in case of the peace process failing. After studying the weakness of the military, the study recommended the use of cluster bombs (which unbanned until 2010 when the Cluster Munitions Convention came into effect) to destroy unarmoured area targets and recommended arming Kafirs and Mi-24 gunships with guided weapons in case of fighting close to enemy forces. The US also donated the SLNS Samudura during this time.

The opposition and nationalist movements of the country strongly opposed CFA and the overall peace process of Wickremesinghe's regime. They continuously criticized and protested against the CFA claiming it as a threat to the sovereignty of the country which would ultimately lead the way to the formation of a separate state for the LTTE, or Tamil Eelam. It was later claimed by Karuna Amman who defected from the LTTE during Wickremesinghe's regime that the LTTE dragged the peace talks to smuggle weapons and ammunition including aircraft.

The LTTE continuously violated the CFA on many occasions. In August 2007, the SLMM agreed that the LTTE had violated the CFA on a total of 3830 occasions while the government of Sri Lanka had violated CFA in only 351 occasions. Several Sri Lankan Army intelligence operatives were allegedly killed by the LTTE during this period.

=== Opposition (2004–2015) ===
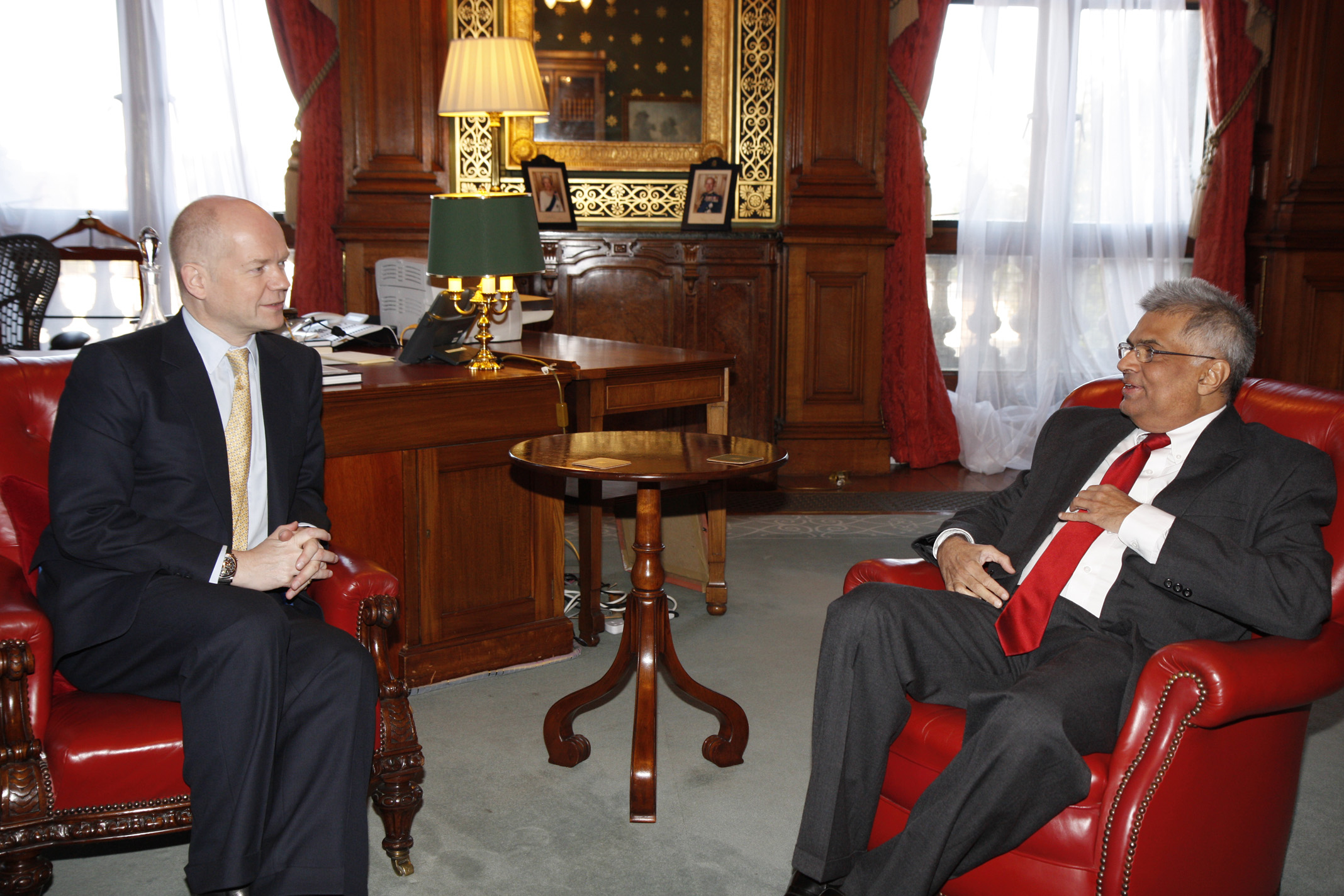
Opposition Leader Wickremasinghe meeting British Foreign Secretary William Hague, 2010

A few days after LTTE proposed the Interim Self Governing Authority (ISGA), President Chandrika Kumaratunga sacked three ministers of the cabinet and took over the ministries using her constitutional powers, ending the uneasy coalition between her and Wickremesinghe while he was out of the country. Addressing the nation she claimed that this decision was taken in the interest of national security. The Janatha Vimukthi Peramuna also allied with the PA to defeat Wickremesinghe's government, which they claimed to be a threat to the sovereignty of the country. President Chandrika Kumaratunga dissolved the parliament on 7 February 2004 which effectively ended Wickremesinghe's government.

President Kumaratunga unexpectedly dissolved the Parliament on 7 February 2004 and called for new parliamentary elections. In the 2004 parliamentary elections held on 2 April Wickremesinghe's UNF lost governmental office. Despite the expectation of a full six-year term, and planned projects cut short by the defeat, the UNP was optimistic that it could regain power in a future election. Within 14 months of UPFA's victory, the radical JVP wing's (composed of over 30 members) parting of ways with the government, left the UPFA's parliamentary composition well short of the required majority. He remained in the post of the Opposition Leader until 2015, when Maithripala Sirisena who was sworn in as the President, appointed him as the Prime Minister.

==== 2005 presidential election ====
In December 2004, Wickremesinghe was chosen by the United National Party as its presidential candidate for the presidential elections due in late 2005. The Supreme Court decided in August 2005 that the elections should be held that year despite the president's argument that her term would end in 2006. Mahinda Rajapaksa, then prime minister, was nominated as the presidential candidate of the Sri Lanka Freedom Party. In the presidential election held on 17 November 2005, Wickremesinghe was narrowly defeated by Mahinda Rajapaksa, who won 50.29% of the vote to Wickremesinghe's 48.43%. A large number of the minority Tamil population in the Northern and Eastern parts of the country, who were largely expected to vote for Wickremesinghe in the election, were prevented from voting by the LTTE which had enforced a boycott of the polls.

==== Dissent within the UNP ====
After the defeat in the 2004 parliamentary election, a senior member of UNP and a former minister of Wickremesinghe's prime ministerial government, Rohitha Bogollagama, crossed over to the UPFA government. Soon after the UNP's defeat in the 2005 presidential election, Mahinda Samarasinghe and Keheliya Rambukwella also defected to the government.

In 2007, Wickremesinghe established a memorandum of understanding (MOU) with the Mahinda Rajapaksa government agreeing to UNP's collaboration with the government on issues of national interest. However, shortly afterwards, 17 of the UNP's 60 members in parliament, including the group who had challenged Wickremesinghe's leadership, led by deputy leader Karu Jayasuriya crossed over to the governing UPFA ranks in parliament and were given ministerial appointments. The group consisted of senior members of UNP and many of them were former ministers of Wickremesinghe's 2001–2004 government: Karu Jayasuriya (Deputy Leader of UNP), M. H. Mohamed (former speaker of the parliament), Milinda Moragoda, G. L. Peiris, Bandula Gunawardane, Lakshman Yapa Abeywardena, Gamini Lokuge, P. Dayaratna, Mano Wijeyeratne, Rajitha Senaratne, R.A.D. Sirisena, Mahinda Wijesekara, Naween Dissanayake, Hemakumara Nanayakkara, R. M. Dharmadasa Banda, Neomal Perera and Chandrasiri Sooriyaarachchi. The defection of the party stalwarts to join the government continued thereafter with several members such as; Susantha Punchinilame, Mahinda Ratnatilaka, Nandimithra Ekanayake, Thilanga Sumathipala, R. Duminda Silva, Ravindra Randeniya and Ashoka Wadigamangawa. However, in late 2008, Jayasuriya crossed over once again to the opposition and was given back the deputy leader post.

In February 2008, Wickremesinghe was under pressure to step down from the party leadership to accept an advisory position, from a majority of the UNP's parliamentary group. In March, the UNP working committee decided to create a new post called Senior Leader of the party and appointed Wickremesinghe to the post. This was amid discussion with the UNP's parliamentary group about the need for Wickremesinghe to relinquish his post (of party leader) so that a new leader could be appointed. However, in late March the party working committee decided that he should remain as the party leader.

Wickremesinghe was accused of being a dictator in UNP during his time as opposition leader. Udugama Sri Buddharakkitha Thero said that Wickremesinghe was acting like a dictator. In 2010, UNP MP Dayasiri Jayasekara accused that within the constitution of the UNP, Ranil Wickremesinghe is not a democratic leader but a dictator. Former minister and UNP MP Mahinda Wijesekara commented that "We don't need a dictator in the party," saying that Wickremesinghe opposed party reforms.

More than 60 UNP MPs allegedly left the party during Wickremesinghe's leadership as opposition leader.

==== End of the civil war and 2010 presidential election ====
With the military defeat of the LTTE in the civil war, the government held a series of provincial elections in 2008 and 2009 for 8 provincial councils (Eastern, North Central, Sabaragamuwa, North Western, Central, Western, Uva, and Southern). On all occasions, the ruling UPFA soundly defeated the UNP in a landslide victory. Out of all the elections, the UNP obtained only 30% of the total vote and UPFA won 59% of the total polled. The UPFA won by a margin of 2,527,783, compared to 180,786 in the 2005 presidential election.

Wickremesinghe signed an Alliance Agreement with twelve other opposition parties in November 2009 and he announced that a common candidate would be fielded for the presidential election which would be held in 2010. Later, he announced that former Army Commander Sarath Fonseka had been selected as the common candidate and pledged to support him.

In August 2012, Minister of Health and SLFP general secretary Maithripala Sirisena alleged that during the 1994 presidential election campaign, all campaign details concerning the UNP presidential candidate Gamini Dissanayake had been secretly passed on to his opponent, Chandrika Kumaratunga by Wickremesinghe. Sirisena made this disclosure while addressing an election committee meeting held at Siripura, Polonnaruwa. Sirisena asserted that he had ample proof to validate his claim and allegations. Consequently, both parties started to challenge each other for open media debates.

=== Third, fourth and fifth premierships (2015–2019) ===
The UNP along with several other parties and civil organizations signed an Understanding Agreement and decided to field the then Secretary-General of Sri Lanka Freedom Party, Maithripala Sirisena as the common candidate for the 2015 presidential election. Sirisena pledged to appoint Wickremesinghe as Prime Minister if he won the election.

In the elections held on 8 January 2015, Maithripala Sirisena was elected as the 6th President of Sri Lanka, beating incumbent president Mahinda Rajapaksa in his bid for a third term. Sirisena appointed Wickremesinghe as Prime Minister of Sri Lanka during his inauguration on 9 January 2015.

Wickremesinghe's UNP-led UNFGG won the 2015 parliamentary elections held on 17 August 2015, thus he was officially inaugurated as the Prime Minister for a fourth time, with 106 seats in the 225-member Parliament (though short of 7 seats to secure the simple majority of the Parliament) defeating the political rivalry UPFA leader and former President Mahinda Rajapaksa in his bid to return as prime minister after his defeat as president. Wickremesinghe also scored the highest preferential votes in the election with 500,556 votes, beating his rival Rajapaksa by a considerable margin whilst setting a new record as the candidate with the highest number of preferential votes in Sri Lankas' elections history.

Wickremesinghe vowed to regain the majority in the Parliament and make it as the United National Party's Government, at the same time he also promised to secure the futures of younger generations and instantly confirmed that the Government will launch 1 million jobs for the youth as well advancement for the education and health sectors will maintain as promised. He also took steps to develop the former war-zones by touring the affected areas and met civil activists to discuss the issues faced by the Jaffna civilians and schools and to expedite investigations of missing persons. He also took steps to uplift Northern Province communities and to improve their standard of living.

Wickremesinghe also restarted the Megapolis plan which he started in when he was PM in 2001–2004. Surbana was consulted to revise the master plan to suit newer needs. The Ministry of Megapolis and Western development was created for project and the project which expects to convert the currently unplanned Western Province into a major megapolis by 2030 with an estimated population of 8.4 million and expects to solve the issues concerning traffic congestion, waste management and slum dwellers in urban areas. Wickremesinghe also showed interest in Surbana creating a similar plan for Trincomalee in the Eastern province and an agreement was later signed with Surbana for the purpose.

Wickremesinghe proposed major economic reforms and proposed a knowledge based social market economy which will be built on social justice principles that will also focus on the availability of global opportunities for education and strengthening of the health system to face health concerns of the 21st century. He also planned on reducing high income disparity levels in the domestic economy and increasing exports. He launched a plan to reform state-owned enterprise, enter into trade agreements with India and China to increase market access and regain GSP+ to regain EU markets, restructure key investment promotion agencies, develop tourism, attract high spending tourists, and develop the rural economy. Special economic zones and a special financial and business hub in Colombo were also proposed. Wickremesinghe also organized the Sri Lanka Economic Forum 2016 with the presence of international investor and Founder Chairman of Open Society George Soros and Nobel Laureate Economist Joseph Stiglitz and many other experts such as Ricardo Hausmann. The forum was seen as a boost to the Sri Lankan economy and during the forum Soros decided to invest in Sri Lanka the initial investments were expected to be around $300 Million. He also launched a loan and grant scheme for small and medium enterprises named "Swa Shakthi" empower rural entrepreneurs and develop the rural economy. However, in 2017, during his tenure Sri Lanka recorded just 3.1% economic growth rate, the lowest for 16 years.

During the Rajapaksa Administration which oversaw the rise of lawlessness and abuse of state power by Rajapaksa's government ministers and officers after the defeat of the Administration, Prime Minister Wickremesinghe decided to set up the Financial Crimes Investigation Division. This led to arrest Basil Rajapaksa the younger brother of Mahinda Rajapaksa and his political henchmen who were involved in large-scale corruption also were arrested within months after forming the committee. However several family members and friends of Rajapaksa were questioned by the FCID, Rajapaksa fears that his entire family and friends could be prosecuted and brought down to justice. Former President Rajapaksa asked President Sirisena over the pending charges against his family members and political associations be dropped. However, President Sirisena refused to drop the charges that were ongoing, The meeting between President Sirisena and former President Rajapaksa ended up unsuccessful over the President's refusal to consider the key demands of Rajapaksa to be appointed as prime ministerial candidate and the charges against his family members and close associations to be dropped. Rajapaksa's faction in SLFP criticised that the FCID was used as a tool to revenge on his associations and threatened to take legal action against FCID.

The United National Party led by Wickremesinghe suffered a landslide defeat in the 2018 local authority elections. His party was only able to secure 34 councils out of 340 total councils. Mahinda Rajapaksa’s proxy Sri Lanka Podujana Peramuna won 231 councils. After the election defeat some MPs of UNP and party members asked Wickremesinghe to resign from the party leadership and prime minister position. Some media reported that President Maithripala Sirisena also urged Ranil Wickremesinghe Rajapaksa to resign from his position. On the evening of 26 October 2018, President Maithripala Sirisena appointed Mahinda Rajapaksa as prime minister after the United People's Freedom Alliance withdrew from the unity government. He also informed Wickremesinghe was removed from office. Wickremesinghe said he refused to accept the dismissal claiming that it was unconstitutional which triggered a constitutional crisis. Following rulings by the Supreme court and the Appeal court, Rajapaksa backed down and Wickremesinghe was re-instated at prime minister on 16 December 2018.

Following many internal party negotiations Wickremesinghe agreed to back Sajith Premadasa as the party candidate for the 2019 Sri Lankan presidential election. Premadasa was defeated by Gotabaya Rajapaksa who gained 52.25% of the votes against 41.99% by Premadasa.

==== Foreign policy ====
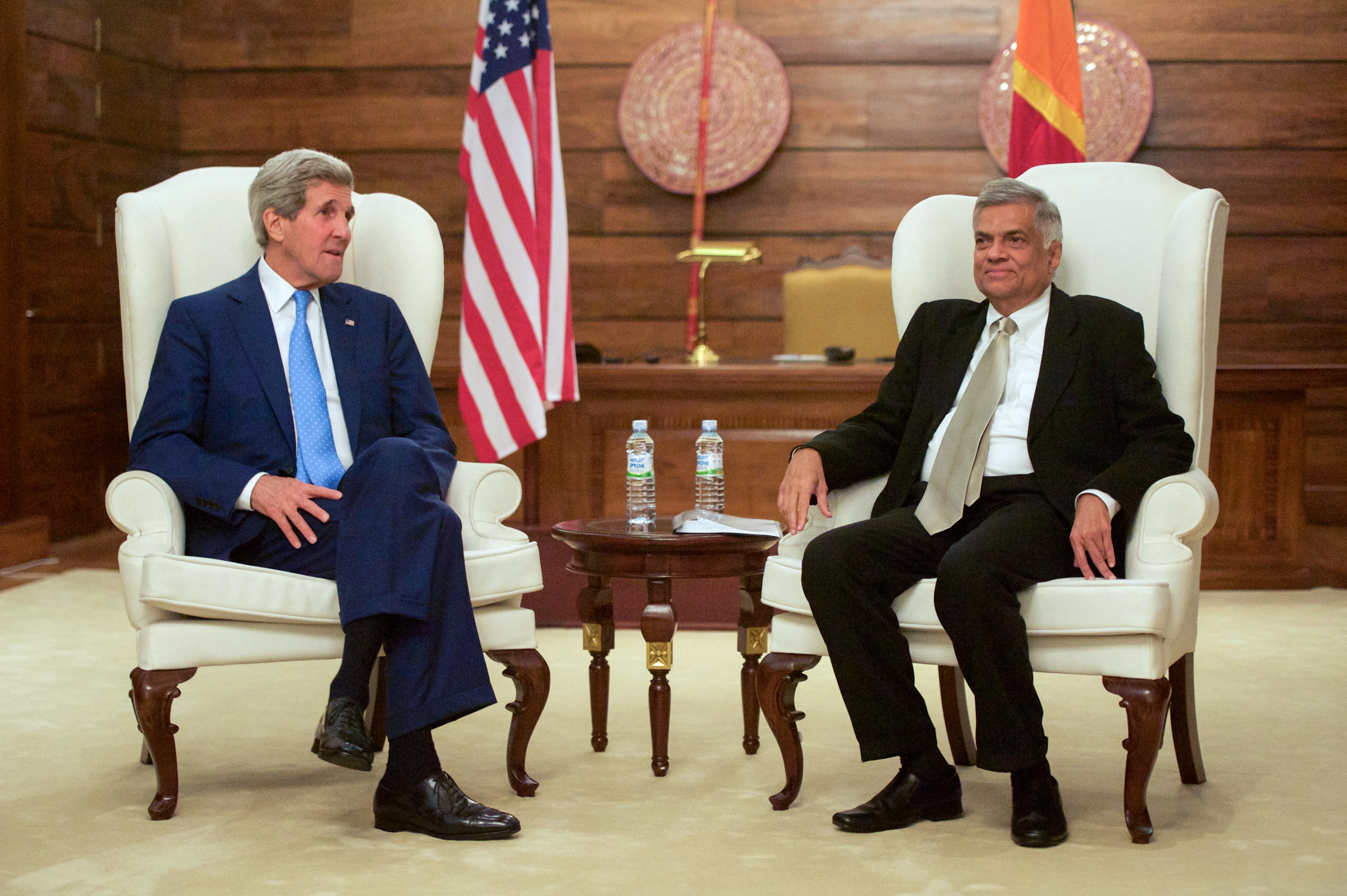
Prime Minister Wickremasinghe with U.S. Secretary of State John Kerry, 2015

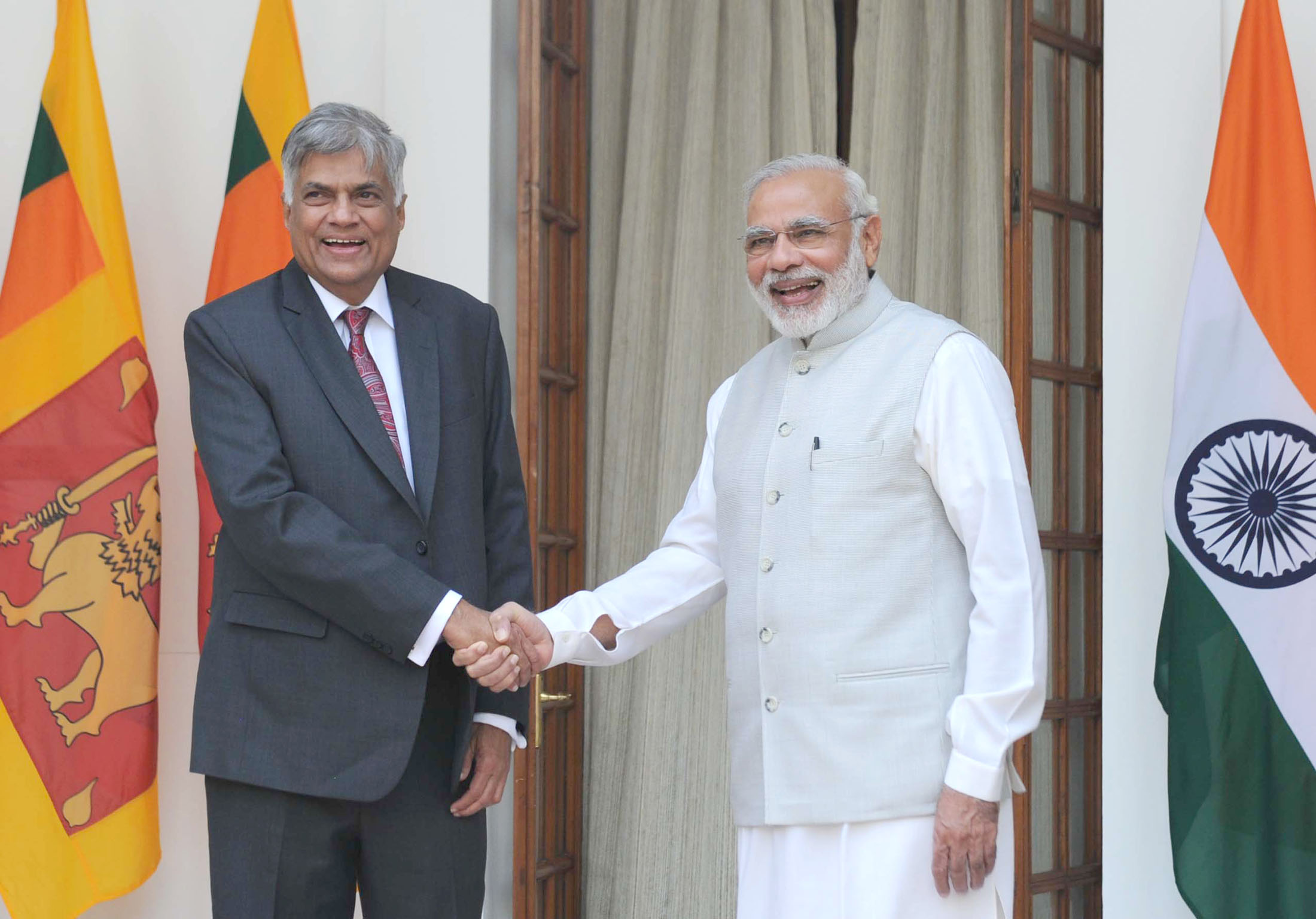
Prime Minister Ranil Wickremesinghe with Indian Prime Minister Narendra Modi, 2015

Wickremesinghe's foreign policy in his third premiership was aimed at re-balancing relations with India and the West that were strained during the previous regime while sustaining good relations with China as well. He also chose to restart discussions to solve the Indo-Sri Lanka fishing dispute but strongly defended the Sri Lankan navy's right to shoot Indian fishermen that fish in Sri Lankan waters, stating:

If someone tries to break into my house, I can shoot. If he gets killed... Law allows me to do that.

— Ranil Wickremesinghe, interview with Thanthi TV

His foreign policy was seen as moving away from the Rajapaksa government's isolationist policies, which distanced Sri Lanka from the Western world. His policies were seen to attract investments and financial aid.

His government allowed a 99-year lease of a port to a Chinese company which caused protests in 2017.

He also worked to develop relations with Japan and Singapore, choosing them as his second and third foreign state visits after being elected as prime minister. During his visit to Japan, he promised to support Japan's bid to secure a seat on the United Nations Security Council and entered to a "comprehensive partnership" with Japan covering political, economic and security issues. During his visit to Singapore, in an interview with The Straits Times he invited Singaporean submarines and frigates to visit Sri Lanka.

=== Opposition (2019–2022) ===
Following his defeat, Premadasa left the party to form his own party, Samagi Jana Balawegaya from which he contested the 2020 Sri Lankan parliamentary election. Wickremesinghe led the remaining party members in the parliamentary election which was delayed by the COVID-19 pandemic. The 2020 parliamentary elections resulted in a landslide victory of the Sri Lanka Podujana Peramuna led by Mahinda Rajapaksa gaining 59.09% of the votes and securing 145 seats in parliament and the Samagi Jana Balawegaya gained 23.90% of votes and 54 seats. The United National Party suffering the worst defeat in its history received a total of 249,435 votes, which was 2.15% of votes cased. For the first time in its history, it failed to win a single seat in parliament, having only gained one national list seat. Wickremesinghe was sworn in as the national list member of parliament of the UNP on 23 June 2021.

Wickremesinghe actively continued to serve as vice chairman of the International Democrat Union and chairman of the Asia Pacific Democrat Union.

=== Fifth premiership (2022) ===
By May 2022, the country was in sovereign default and facing hyperinflation, leading to political and social unrest. With events leading to Mahinda Rajapaksa's resignation on 9 May 2022, due to the 2022 Sri Lankan protests, President Gotabaya Rajapaksa appointed Wickremesinghe as prime minister on 12 May 2022. He was assured the support of the Sri Lanka Podujana Peramuna members of parliament, while other parties refused to join his cabinet initially.

Reuters described Wickremesinghe as an "economic liberal who has experience dealing with the International Monetary Fund". Wickremesinghe has stated that he intends to form a national government with the participation of all political parties in the parliament and lead the country through the worst economic crisis in its history with less than one million USD in foreign reserves and unable to import essential fuel, food, and medicines, calling the months to come the most difficult in the country's history.

On 25 May, Wickremesinghe was appointed Minister of Finance, Economic Stability and National Policies.

On 9 July, the Prime Minister's office announced that Wickremesinghe was ready to resign to make way for an all-party government as protesters stormed and burned his residence that day. Later in the evening, protesters broke into the 115 Fifth Lane, Wickremesinghe's private residence in Colombo, and set it on fire.

== Presidency (2022–2024) ==
On 13 July, President Gotabaya Rajapaksa fled the country to the Maldives, with Wickremesinghe taking charge of the presidency in an acting capacity due to his premiership and imposing a state of emergency in Sri Lanka. Following Rajapaksa's official resignation, Wickremesinghe was sworn in as the acting president of Sri Lanka before Chief Justice Jayantha Jayasuriya on 15 July. Wickremesinghe, who had formerly been a National List MP with his party represented by only one seat in the Parliament, became the President, Prime Minister, Minister of Defense, Minister of Technology, and Minister of Finance all at the same time. Upon becoming the acting president, Wickremesinghe prohibited the usage of "His Excellency" as an honorific prefix for the President and officially abolished the usage of a presidential flag.

On 20 July, he was elected as the 9th President of Sri Lanka by the Parliament of Sri Lanka in a secret ballot to serve the remainder of Rajapaksa's term, which was supposed to end in November 2024. He defeated his main rival, Dullas Alahapperuma, with 134 votes to 82. On 21 July, he was sworn in as the ninth (eighth executive) President of Sri Lanka at the Parliament premises before Chief Justice Jayantha Jayasuriya. A day later, he appointed Dinesh Gunawardena as prime minister.

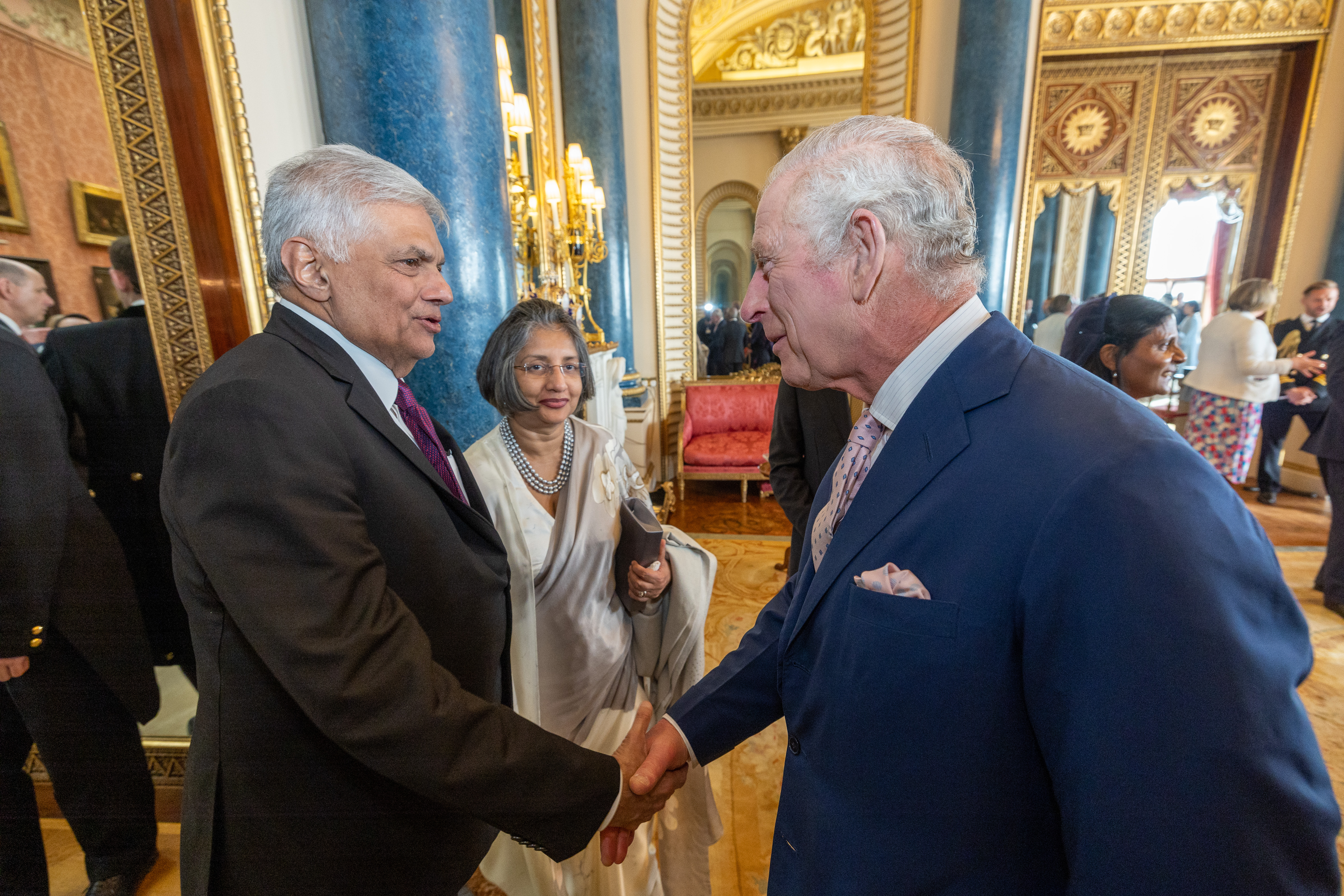
Wickremesinghe meets with Britain's King Charles III at a Reception held at the Buckingham Palace on 5 May 2023.

In September 2022, Wickremesinghe visited the UK as the head of state to attend the funeral of Queen Elizabeth II, at the invitation of King Charles III.

=== Crackdown on anti-government protests ===
Soon after he was appointed the president, Wickremesinghe vowed to crack down on the 2022 anti-government protests. Wickremesinghe denounced the protestors as "fascists". Security forces raided the protest site in Galle Face Green in the early hours of 22 July, a day after Wickremesinghe was sworn in. 50 protestors were injured and two were hospitalised. BBC journalists were also attacked during the raid. Saliya Pieris, president of the Bar Association of Sri Lanka, condemned the raid. British High Commissioner to Sri Lanka, Sarah Hulton, also expressed concerns.

=== Handling of economic crisis ===
Wickremesinghe continued the government policies for economic recovery initiated during the last few days of his predecessor's term. His administration continued power rationing and introduced fuel rationing to control the country's energy crisis, while increasing direct taxes with the aim of increasing government revenue to secure an IMF bailout package by late 2022. These tax increases were largely unpopular and triggered protests organized by the affected sectors. Sri Lanka saw a contraction of 11% of its economy in 2022, with inflation peaking at 54% in December 2022. Wickremesinghe was criticized for hosting celebrations of the 75th anniversary of Sri Lankan independence on 4 February 2023, while the country was amidst an economic crisis.

A significant milestone was achieved by the Wickremesinghe administration in early March 2023, when Wickremesinghe announced to parliament that the IMF has approved the first tranche of US$330 million of its bailout package for Sri Lanka. The IMF bailout was expected to open up additional support of over US$3.75 billion from the World Bank, the Asian Development Bank and other lenders; paving the way for Sri Lanka to rework a substantial part of its $84bn worth of public debt. Under the IMF program, his administration initiated a number of economic reforms including enforcing cost reflective pricing for state owned Ceylon Electricity Board (CEB) and Ceylon Petroleum Corporation (CPC), enacting the Central Bank (CB) Act of Sri Lanka to give freedom to the Central Bank of Sri Lanka in its decision making, enacting several other key economic bills such as Economic Transformation Bill, and improving the relationship with Japan which soured under Gotabaya Rajapaksa over the cancellation of the LRT project. Furthermore, his administration was able to complete most of the debt restructuring process including local and international debt.

=== 2023 local government elections ===
In August 2024, the Supreme Court delivered a landmark judgement which held that Wickremesinghe as the Minister of Finance, former Chairman and members of the Election Commission and the Attorney General, violated the fundamental rights guaranteed under the Sri Lankan Constitution of Dr Harini Amarasuriya, MP of the National People's Power; Ranjith Madduma Bandara, General Secretary of the Samagi Jana Balawegaya; and the Centre for Policy Alternatives and People’s Action for Free and Fair Elections (PAFFREL); by arbitrary and unlawful conduct which led to the 2023 local government elections not taking place at the time that they should have been held. In response, Wickremesinghe acknowledged the Supreme Court's ruling that citizens’ basic rights were violated by the postponement of the local government elections, however stated that he does not regret the decision, stating that he was "dedicated to ensuring the people’s right to live and in maintaining their safety" at the time.

=== 2024 presidential election ===
Since the start of 2024, there were many speculations whether Wickremesinghe would run for a term of his own right in the 2024 presidential election. By mid-2024, Wickremesinghe himself was hinting that he would run for re-election. As the election was called in August 2024, Wickremesinghe announced that he would run for re-election as an independent candidate. He was endorsed by the United National Party and a breakaway faction of Sri Lanka Podujana Peramuna. He was also endorsed by the Ceylon Workers' Congress, Eelam People's Democratic Party, and Mahajana Eksath Peramuna. This was Wickremesinghe's third bid for the presidency, and his first time not running as a candidate of the UNP.

Wickremesinghe was eliminated at the end of the first phase of the vote counting, finishing in third place with only 17.27% of the vote. As no candidate secured a majority of the vote in the polls, the elections moved on to a second phase of preferential vote counting where only the two leading candidates remained in the competition. The eliminated candidates' second and third preferences were counted to elect the president between the top two candidates, Anura Kumara Dissanayake and Sajith Premadasa. As the second preferences count concluded, Anura Kumara Dissanayake was declared the 9th Executive President of Sri Lanka.

Wickremesinghe left the Presidential Secretariat on 23 September 2024, allowing for a peaceful transition of power to Dissanayake, who succeeded him as President.

== Post-presidency ==
Following Wickremesinghe's electoral defeat, UNP deputy leader Ruwan Wijewardene stated that Wickremesinghe would not contest in the upcoming parliamentary elections. However, Wickremesinghe actively campaigned for the New Democratic Front, a political coalition of parties that supported him during his presidential campaign.

== Controversies ==
=== Batalanda Commission ===
In the lead up to the 1994 general election it was alleged by the People's Alliance government that Wickremesinghe, as the Member of Parliament for the Kelaniya electorate, was the political authority behind an illegal detention centre in the Batalanda housing and industrial complex outside Colombo between 1988 and 1990 which was allegedly run by a police counter-subversive unit as part of the state's operation to put down an armed insurgency by the JVP. The People's Alliance government of President Chandrika Kumaratunga appointed a Commission of Inquiry to investigate activities of Batalanda and on 3 September 1997 Wickremesinghe was summoned to testify before the commission. The Commission's report was released on 12 April 1998. The commission was a fact-finding mission and had no judicial powers; however, it recommended the government to "bring the guilty to book". One of its findings was that "Wickremesinghe and the SSP Nalin Delgoda, are indirectly responsible for the maintenance of places of unlawful detention and torture chambers in houses at the Batalanda Housing Scheme". It further stated that Wickremesinghe held "unauthorised meetings of police officers involved in counter-insurgency operations in the housing complex, and that as such, he had abused his authority". No criminal proceedings took place thereafter.

In 2025, during an interview with Mehdi Hasan on Al Jazeera, Wickremesinghe addressed several allegations related to the Batalanda Commission Report which was shared by Frances Harrison, Director of the International Truth and Justice Project, and reiterated that he had no involvement in the alleged incident. Government spokesman Nalinda Jayatissa stated that a decision on further action would be taken during a Cabinet discussion. The Leader of the House, Bimal Rathnayake tabled the report in Parliament in March, stating that it would be forwarded to the Attorney General for further legal action and called for a parliamentary debate in April. Wickremesinghe responded that he rejects the report claiming that it was politically motivated and that it is unprecedented to debate tabled report 25 years after its publication.

=== Government bonds controversy ===
In February 2015 CBSL advertised the sale of Rs. 1 billion in 30 year government bonds at a coupon of 12.5%, though several accounts erroneously cite an indicative rate of 9.5%. The sale was oversubscribed with 36 bids totaling Rs. 20 billion. The majority of bidders, 26, bidded for Rs. 100 million or less at a rate of 9.5%–10.5%. However, a few bidders, including Perpetual Treasuries Limited, wanted interest rates of 11%–12%. On 27 February 2015 the CBSL accepted Rs. 10 billion in bids at rates of 9.5%–12.5%. The issuing of ten times the advertised bonds, and at a higher than expected rate, was alleged to cost the Sri Lankan government an additional Rs. 1.6 billion ($10.6 million), though this was disputed by the Leader of the House of Parliament. A petition was lodged in the Supreme Court of Sri Lanka contesting the methodology used to allege such a loss. Perpetual Treasuries was issued, directly and indirectly, with Rs. 5 billion in bonds at 12.5%. Perpetual Treasuries was one of the primary dealers in the sale and is owned by son-in-law of the Governor of the Central Bank of Sri Lanka Arjuna Mahendran, who was appointed by Wickremesinghe.

On 28 October 2016 the Committee On Public Enterprises, after a lengthy investigation, found Mahendran responsible for the bond issue scam and recommended legal action be taken against him. However, President Maithripala Sirisena announced that he had appointed a Special Presidential Commission of Inquiry to further investigate the case. The commission handed over the report on Central Bank bond issuance to Sirisena on 30 December 2017, and the Presidential Secretariat made available the full report in PDF form from its website for public viewing. During the investigation Wickremesinghe had to appear before the Special Presidential Commission of Inquiry. A group of ministers from the President's party along with opposition MPs failed in a recent attempt to pass a motion of no-confidence against the Prime Minister in Sri Lanka's Parliament. On 15 March 2018 Colombo Fort Magistrate's Court issued an arrest warrant on Arjuna Mahendra on charges of criminal breach of trust for allegedly providing confidential information of the Central Bank of Sri Lanka to Perpetual Treasuries Limited.

=== Emergency regulations and human rights concerns ===
In July 2022, as Acting President, Wickremesinghe imposed emergency regulations to disperse peaceful protesters during the "Aragalaya" movement. The Supreme Court of Sri Lanka later ruled that these regulations violated fundamental human rights.

=== Legal challenges and bribery allegations ===
Wickremesinghe has been summoned multiple times by the Commission to Investigate Allegations of Bribery or Corruption (CIABOC). In May 2025, he raised concerns over submissions made against him in court, alleging they were misleading. Legal proceedings continue to scrutinize his involvement in various matters.

=== Controversial internet regulation ===
Under his presidency, the government passed a law granting authorities the power to remove online posts and pursue legal action against internet users. Critics viewed this as an attempt to suppress freedom of expression.

=== Allegations of misappropriating state funds and arrest ===
On 22 August 2025, Wickremesinghe was arrested by the Criminal Investigation Department (CID) of the Sri Lanka Police in connection with allegations of misappropriation of state funds.

Authorities alleged that Wickremesinghe misused approximately Rs16.9 million (about US$50,000) in public funds for a visit to London in September 2023, which coincided with his wife Maithree Wickremesinghe's PhD graduation at the University of Wolverhampton. No official government meetings were held during this period. Investigators stated that the visit was appended to Wickremesinghe's official travel to Cuba for the Group of 77 summit and to the United States for the general debate of the seventy-eighth session of the United Nations General Assembly. The CID commenced inquiries into the matter in June 2025, recording statements from his former presidential secretary Saman Ekanayake and private secretary Sandra Perera.

Wickremesinghe was taken into custody and produced before the Colombo Fort Magistrate on 22 August. This was the first instance of a former Sri Lankan head of state being arrested. He was subsequently remanded until 26 August. Later that day, due to declining health conditions, he was transferred to the prison hospital and on the following day to the intensive care unit (ICU) of the National Hospital of Sri Lanka in Colombo. He was granted bail by the court on 26 August. The opposition called the arrest politically motivated by the government.

== Electoral history ==
Presidential Elections
Year	Constituency	Party	Votes	%	+/−	Result
1999	Sri Lanka	United National Party	3,602,748	42.71%	42.71	Lost
2005	Sri Lanka	United National Party	4,706,366	48.43%	▲5.72	Lost
2022	Parliament	United National Party	134 (E.V.)	61.19%	61.19	Elected
2024	Sri Lanka	Independent	2,299,767	17.27%	▼31.16	Lost

Parliamentary Elections
Year	Constituency	Party	Votes	%	+/−	Result
1977	Biyagama	United National Party	22,045	57.50%	57.50	Elected
1989	Gampaha District	United National Party	86,477	22.42%	22.42	Elected
1994	Colombo District	United National Party	291,194	75.62%	▲53.20	Elected
2000	Colombo District	United National Party	363,668	82.52%	▲6.90	Elected
2001	Colombo District	United National Party	415,686	76.07%	▼6.45	Elected
2004	Colombo District	United National Party	329,524	74.57%	▼1.50	Elected
2010	Colombo District	United National Party	232,957	68.56%	▼6.01	Elected
2015	Colombo District	United National Party	500,566	78.12%	▲9.56	Elected
2020	Colombo District	United National Party	-	-	-	Lost

== Family and personal life ==
Wickremesinghe married Maithree Wickremesinghe, a Sri Lankan academic and Professor of English in 1994. Wickremesinghe has made several efforts to keep his private life out of politics. His personal life is rarely publicized or discussed. Maithree Wickremesinghe avoided the political spotlight until Wickremesinghe's re-election as prime minister in 2015.

His paternal grandfather was Cyril Leonard Wickremesinghe, of the Ceylon Civil Service who was the first Sinhalese Land Commissioner and his grandmother was Esme Moonemalle Goonewardene, daughter of Proctor Edward Goonewardene and Ada Moonemalle of Moonemalle Walawwa, Kurunegala whose brother was Theodore Barcroft L. Moonemalle Proctor and Member of the Legislative Council of Ceylon.

His maternal grandfather was D. R. Wijewardena son of Muhandiram Tudugalage Don Philip Wijewardena and Helena Wijewardena née Dep Weerasinghe. His grandmother was Alice Ruby Meedeniya, daughter of J. H. Meedeniya Adigar of Meedeniya Walawwa, Ruwanwella and Corneliya Magdleine Senanayake whose mother was Corneliya Regina Senanayake née Obeyesekere, sister of Lambertus Obeyesekere Maha Mudaliyar of Kataluwa Walawwa.

A number of Wickremesinghe's close relations were active in the government. Of his cousins Ruwan Wijewardene was the State Minister of Defence, Wasantha Senanayake was the State Minister of Foreign Affairs and his aunt Amari Wijewardene was the Sri Lanka High Commissioner to the United Kingdom.

== Honours ==
- Robert E. Wilhelm Fellow – Massachusetts Institute of Technology (2014)
- Doctor of Laws (honorary) – Deakin University (2017)

== Works ==
- Wickremesinghe, Ranil (2005). Dēśapālanaya saha dharmaya (in Sinhala). Sarasavi Prakāśanayō. ISBN 978-955-573-378-6.

== See also ==
- List of political families in Sri Lanka
- List of international prime ministerial trips made by Ranil Wickremesinghe
- List of international presidential trips made by Ranil Wickremesinghe

Political offices
Preceded by Nissanka Wijeyeratne	Minister of Education; 1980–1989	Succeeded by W. J. M. Lokubandara
Preceded by Dingiri Banda Wijetunge	Prime Minister of Sri Lanka; 1993–1994	Succeeded by Chandrika Kumaratunga
Preceded by Gamini Dissanayake	Leader of the Opposition; 1994–2001	Succeeded by Ratnasiri Wickremanayake
Preceded by Ratnasiri Wickremanayake	Prime Minister of Sri Lanka; 2001–2004	Succeeded by Mahinda Rajapaksa
Preceded by Mahinda Rajapaksa	Leader of the Opposition; 2004–2015	Succeeded by Nimal Siripala de Silva
Preceded by D. M. Jayaratne	Prime Minister of Sri Lanka; 2015–2018	Succeeded by Mahinda Rajapaksa
Preceded by Mahinda Rajapaksa	Prime Minister of Sri Lanka; 2018–2019	Succeeded by Mahinda Rajapaksa
Preceded by Mahinda Rajapaksa	Prime Minister of Sri Lanka; 2022	Succeeded by Dinesh Gunawardena
Preceded by Ali Sabry	Minister of Finance; 2022–2024	Succeeded by Anura Kumara Dissanayake
Preceded by Gotabaya Rajapaksa	President of Sri Lanka; 2022–2024	Succeeded by Anura Kumara Dissanayake
Preceded by Gotabaya Rajapaksa	Minister of Defence; 2022–2024	Succeeded by Anura Kumara Dissanayake
Preceded by Gotabaya Rajapaksa	Minister of Technology; 2022–2024	Succeeded by Harini Amarasuriya
Parliament of Sri Lanka
Preceded by Ranasinghe Premadasa	Leader of the House; 1989–1993	Succeeded by Wijayapala Mendis
Party political offices
Preceded by Dingiri Banda Wijetunga	Leader of the United National Party; 1994–present	Incumbent
