= Murder of K. Tharshan =

2016 murder of a child in Sri Lanka

K. Tharshan
- Born: November 2, 2009
- Died: 25 January 2016 (aged 6); Sampur, Sri Lanka
- Cause of death: Drowning
- Known for: Murder victim

Kugathas Tharshan (died 25 January 2016; also spelled Kugadas Darshan) was a 6-year-old Sri Lankan Tamil boy who was raped and murdered near the Sampur High Security Zone in eastern Sri Lanka in January 2016.

== Background ==
Tharshan's family resettled in Sampur in 2015. He had enrolled at Sampur Maha Vidyalayam in the first grade, in January 2016. Eyewitnesses had seen Sri Lanka Navy personnel from a nearby sentry point grooming Tharshan with chocolates and other food.

== Incident ==
On 25 January 2016 Tharshan had been playing with his brother and another boy. Later Tharshan's father Selvaratnam Kugathas had seen him playing in front of their home. He then disappeared. Tharshan's mother Kugathas Jeyavani went to find him but could not locate him. He was reported missing at around 5:30 p.m. Locals started searching for him and discovered his body in an abandoned well, approximately 30 m (98 ft) from his house, near the "Vidura" navy camp. Locals initially thought that Tharshan had slipped and fell into the well. Coroner A. J. A. Noorullah arrived at the scene after a while and instructed a person to retrieve the body. When the body was recovered from the well at around midnight, it was discovered that Tharshan's body had been tied to a stone weighing more than 3 kg (6.6 lb), using shoe laces before being thrown into the well. According to locals there were signs that Tharshan had been sexually abused before being murdered.

Tharshan's body was sent to Trincomalee Hospital for a post-mortem. According to Judicial Medical Officer W. R. A. S. Rajapakshe the preliminary post-mortem has revealed that Tharshan died of drowning. Rajapakshe's report was submitted to Muttur Magistrate I. N. Rilwan for further investigation. The police returned Tharshan's body to his family following the post-mortem. According to the police there were no signs of sexual assault.

== Investigation ==
A fifteen-year-old boy was arrested on 2 February 2016 in connection with the murder. However, locals have alleged that navy personnel were responsible for raping and murdering Tharshan and that the police were protecting them.

== See also ==
- Murder of S. Vithiya
