= Killing of V. Sulakshan and N. Gajan =

2016 shooting in Kokkuvil, Sri Lanka

Shooting of V. Sulakshan and N. Gajan
- Date: 20 October 2016
- Venue: Kokkuvil, Sri Lanka
- Participants: V. Sulakshan, N. Gajan and Sri Lanka Police
- Deaths: Two

Sri Lankan Tamil students V. Sulakshan and N. Gajan were shot dead by police in Kokkuvil in northern Sri Lanka on the night of 20 October 2016.

== Background ==
Vijayakumar (Note: Also Sukantharajah, Sundiraja.) Sulakshan (Note: Also Sulaxan.) was 24 years old and from Kandarodai. Nadarajah (Note: Also Nadarasa.) Gajan was 23 years old and from Iranaimadu. Both men were third year students at the University of Jaffna's Faculty of Arts and were studying political science and journalism.

== Incident ==
On the night of 20 October 2016 Gajan attended a social event at Sulakshan's house in Jaffna. After the event Sulakshan was returning Gajan to his student hostel in Chunnakam on a motorcycle when, at around 11.30pm, the pair were shot by police at Kulapiddy junction on the Jaffna-KKS Road in Kokkuvil. According to the police the students had failed to stop at a police roadblock at the junction and sped off. The police opened fire, hitting the rider, Sulakshan, twice in the head and killing him. The motorcycle rammed into a parapet wall on the roadside which resulted in serious injuries to the passenger, Gajan. The police claimed that the students were under the influence of alcohol.

Sulakshan and Gajan were rushed to Jaffna Teaching Hospital where Sulakshan was pronounced dead whilst Gajan succumbed to his injuries shortly afterwards.

== Aftermath ==
A tense situation prevailed in the area after the incident as other students surrounded the hospital's mortuary. The news of the shooting was suppressed by the police and it was not until the following night that the event was reported in Sri Lanka's national media. The police initially denied that there was a shooting, claiming that the two deaths were accidental. This led to accusations of a police cover-up.

On the morning of 21 October 2016, Jaffna Magistrate S. Satheeshkaran arrived at the scene of the shooting to begin a magisterial inquiry. Post-mortems were carried out that afternoon and initial reports suggested that bullets were found in the victims' bodies. Sulakshan was reported to have been shot three times and had injuries to his chest, neck and spine. Gajan was reportedly shot at least once. According to the official Judicial Medical Officer's report, Sulakshan was killed by a shot in the chest and Gajan died of head injuries sustained during the crash into the wall. The students bodies were returned to their parents but they were ordered to bury them rather than cremate.

After the post-mortem contradicted the police's earlier statement, officers from the Criminal Investigation Department were sent to take over the investigation. On 22 October 2016 five police personnel, a sub-inspector, a sergeant, two constables and a driver, were arrested and remanded until 4 November 2016.

Expressing grief over the deaths, President of Sri Lanka Maithripala Sirisena ordered an impartial inquiry and compensation for the students' parents. The shooting was condemned by the Tamil National Alliance, the largest political party representing Sri Lankan Tamils.
