= 19th Summit of the Non-Aligned Movement =

2023 Munyonyo summit conference

- The summit's official logo
- Host country: Uganda
- Dates: January 2024
- Motto: 'Deepening Cooperation for Shared Global Affluence'
- Cities: Kampala
- Follows: 18th Summit (Baku, Azerbaijan)
- Precedes: to be determined
- Website: nam.go.ug

The 19th Summit of the Non-Aligned Movement was held in January 2024 in Kampala, Uganda. Out of 120 member states around 90 participated in the summit including 30 heads of state. The event was marked by strong criticism of Israel's actions during the Gaza war by many participating delegations. It was the first time since 2009 (Sharm El Sheikh) that the NAM summit was organized in Africa and first time since 1998 (Durban) it was organized in Sub-Saharan Africa.

The hosting of the event coincided with the hosting of the Group of 77 summit later that year, marking the first instance where both summits were organized by the same country. This dual hosting initiative aimed to enhance the country's global standing, particularly amidst strong criticism from Western nations regarding the significant downturn in LGBT rights in Uganda.

== Overview ==
The Non-Aligned Movement (NAM) is a forum that is not formally aligned with or against any major power bloc. After the United Nations, it is the largest grouping of states worldwide.

Drawing on the principles agreed at the Bandung Conference in 1955, the NAM was established in 1961 in Belgrade, Yugoslavia through the initiative of President of Yugoslavia Josip Broz Tito, President of Egypt Gamal Abdel Nasser, Prime Minister of India Jawaharlal Nehru, President of Indonesia Sukarno, and President of Ghana Kwame Nkrumah.

After the breakup of Yugoslavia, a founding member, its membership was suspended in 1992 at the regular ministerial meeting held in New York during the regular annual session of the United Nations General Assembly.

As of October 2019, the organization consists of 120 member states, including the non-UN member state of Palestine, as well as 17 other observer countries and 10 observer organizations.

Approximately, two-thirds of the United Nations' members are represented at the Non-Aligned Movement, and they comprise 55% of the world's population.

== Arrangement ==
The 19th Summit was decided to be conducted in the capital of Uganda, Kampala as the 18th Non-Aligned Movement (NAM) Summit was held in Azerbaijan. The summit took place between 15 and 20 January 2024 at Speke Resort Munyonyo.

== Participants ==
Out of 120 full member states of the movement, 93 of them actively participated in the event in Kampala. South Africa was represented by president Cyril Ramaphosa. India, one of the founding and core members of the movement that more recently tended to distance itself from NAM due to controversial chairmen selection, was represented by Minister of External Affairs S. Jaishankar. In the backdrop of strong criticism of Israel by many participants, Jaishankar avoided explicit condemnation of any side in Gaza war and underlined the substantial humanitarian assistance that his country has extended to the Palestinians while underlining the need for a two-state solution. In reference to Russian invasion of Ukraine he stressed how war "anywhere has consequences everywhere." The delegation of Nepal included Prime Minister Pushpa Kamal Dahal and Minister of Foreign Affairs Narayan Prakash Saud.

Among the observer countries of the Non-Aligned Movement, Presidency of Bosnia and Herzegovina, three-member collective head of state, was represented by Bosnian Serb member Željka Cvijanović. She stated that the policy of non-alignment has stood the test of time, and its principles and values are just as crucial to the world today as they were 60 years ago at the time of the 1st Summit of the Non-Aligned Movement in SFR Yugoslavia. Serbia was represented by Minister of Foreign Affairs Ivica Dačić who highlighted the significance of the movement for his country as most of NAM members are ″countries that are friendly to us″ and with majority of them not recognising Kosovo effectively preventing its membership in the United Nations.

Guest countries included Turkey which was represented by Vice President of Turkey Cevdet Yılmaz who criticised the United Nations Security Council for failing to call for a ceasefire in Gaza Strip.

== See also ==
- Seventy-ninth session of the United Nations General Assembly
