= Trial at bar =

A trial at bar is a trial before two or more judges. The procedure was often used in cases which raised novel points of law or for high-profile trials. Among famous trials at bar are the trials of Sir Roger Casement and Dr Leander Starr Jameson.

In England and Wales, in civil cases where the Crown is interested, the Attorney General's right to claim a trial at bar is expressly preserved by Section 40(2)(g) of the Crown Proceedings Act 1947, but the practice seems to have fallen into disuse.
