= Cyril C. Perera =

- Born: 3 June 1923; Colombo, Sri Lanka
- Died: 4 September 2016 (aged 93); Colombo, Sri Lanka
- Education: Colombo Technical College
- Writing career
- Language: Sinhalese
- Notable awards: Sahithya Rathna (සාහිත්‍ය රත්න)

Cyril C. Perera (3 June 1923 – 4 September 2016) was a Sri Lankan author of Sinhala literature who was well known for his translations of world literature into Sinhalese. His translations included novels, short stories, poems, stage plays, and children's literature.

Perera was born in Colombo and attended various schools there. He studied art, architecture, and building engineering at Colombo Technical College and later joined government service. He worked as a building designer in the Ministry of Health.

== Publications ==
Title	Original author	Original work
Novels
යුද්ධය හා සාමය	Leo Tolstoy	War and Peace
පෙමතො ජායති සොකො	Leo Tolstoy	
මිනිසා ජීවත් වන්නේ කුමකින්ද?	Leo Tolstoy	The Kreutzer Sonata
මෛත්‍රී කරුණාව	Leo Tolstoy	
මළ මිනිස්සු	Nikolai Gogol	Dead Souls
පෙරළුැ නැවුම් පස	Mikhail Sholokov	Virgin Soil Upturned
ගැඹුරු මුහුද	Arthur C. Clarke	The Deep Range
ධවල තල්මසාගේ කතා පුවත	Herman Melville	Moby-Dick
වෘකයන් අතර නග්නව	Bruno Apitz	Naked Among Wolves
එමා බෝවාරි	Gustav Flaubert	Madame Bovary
මහල්ලා සහ මුහුද	Ernest Hemingway	The Old Man and the Sea
