= Duminda Silva =

Sri Lankan politician

Duminda Silva MP

Member of Parliament for Colombo
- In office 22 April 2010 – 26 June 2015
- Majority: 146,336 Preferential Votes

Member of Western Provincial Council
- In office 2004–2010

Personal details
- Born: Arumadura Lawrence Romelo Duminda Silva; 3 December 1974 (age 51) Colombo, Sri Lanka
- Party: Sri Lanka Podujana Peramuna
- Website: rdumindhasilva.com
- Criminal information
- Penalty: Death penalty

Arumadura Lawrence Romelo Duminda Silva (born 3 December 1974: as Sinhala :දුමින්ද සිල්වා), popularly known as Duminda Silva or R. Dumindha Silva, is a Sri Lankan politician and a former Member of Parliament. He is the brother of Raynor Silva, owner of the Asia Broadcasting Corporation. On 8 September 2016 he was sentenced to death by the High Court of Sri Lanka for the murder of Sri Lankan politician Bharatha Lakshman Premachandra, a political rival.

On 24 June 2021 he was released under a special presidential pardon by President Gotabaya Rajapaksa. However, the Supreme Court has issued an interim order suspending the pardon and he was later re-arrested.

== Political career ==
In the July 2004 provincial council election, Silva was elected to represent Colombo District in the Western Provincial Council. He defected from the United National Party to the United People's Freedom Alliance in November 2007. The UNP accused Silva of defecting to the UPFA in the hope that the criminal cases against him would not be pursued and the Asia Broadcasting Corporation's broadcasting licence would be restored.

Silva was re-elected in the April 2009 provincial council election.

In the April 2010 parliamentary election Silva was elected to represent the Colombo District in Parliament.

== Shooting and Trial ==
During the 2011 local elections, Silva sustained injuries from a shooting and was hospitalized. As a result of the gunfire, former MP Bharatha Lakshman Premachandra and three others were killed. On 15 November 2011, a magistrate ordered Silva's arrest for the killing of Premachandra.

President's Counsel Anil Silva appeared for eleventh accused; Duminda Silva, and Senior Counsel Asoka Weerasooriya appeared for the second, fourth, sixth, eighth and ninth accused. Anuja Premaratne PC appeared for the first accused, Nalin Indatissa PC, Nalin Weerakoon, and Asela Rekawa appeared for the other accused.

The prosecution consisted of a team of lawyers from the Attorney General's Department led by Deputy Solicitor General Thusith Mudalige. About 42 witnesses testified in Court, while 126 documents, including JMO reports and Government Analyst's reports were produced. The proceedings concluded on 14 July 2016.

On 8 September 2016, the High Court of Sri Lanka found Silva and four of his associates guilty and imposed the maximum penalty, the death sentence, on all of them for the killing of Bharatha Premachandra and three of his supporters. The decision of the three judge High Court Trial-at-Bar was divided with Judges Padmini Ranawake and Charith Morais deciding on a guilty verdict on five of the suspects and Judge Shiran Gooneratne acquitting all suspects of all charges.

It was alleged, before the verdict was announced, that Judge Gooneratne was involved in a conspiracy to acquit the main suspect Duminda Silva. Details of Judge Gooneratne's alleged involvement in this case have been reported in the Sri Lankan press soon after the verdict was announced.

=== Appeal to Supreme Court ===
The Trial-at-bar High Court decision was later appealed at the Supreme Court. A five-judge bench of the Supreme Court presided over by the then Chief Justice Priyasath Dep, included Justices Buwaneka Aluvihare, Priyantha Jayawardena, Nalin Perera and Vijith Malalgoda. The Supreme Court was unanimous in their decision, and rejected the appeal and upheld the conviction unanimously. The Supreme Court ruling was issued on 11 October 2018.

=== Special Presidential Pardon ===
On 24 June 2021 he was released under a special presidential pardon by President Gotabaya Rajapaksa. Michelle Bachelet, the UN High Commissioner for Human rights conveyed her displeasure over the release of Duminda and insisted that Sri Lanka is giving another example for preferential selective granting of pardons.

On 30 May 2022, The Supreme Court suspended the pardon and he was later re-arrested.
