= List of Archaeological Protected Monuments in Matara District =

This is a list of Archaeological Protected Monuments in Matara District, Sri Lanka.

Monument	Image	Location	Grama Niladhari Division	Divisional Secretary's Division	Registered	Description	Refs
Agrabodhi Raja Maha Vihara		Weligama		Weligama			
Aarachchi Walawwa (bearing Assessment number 26)			Bazaar East	Matara	6 July 2007	At Dharmapala Mawatha	
'Rendagedara' building (bearing Assessment Number 40)			Number 433c	Devinuwara	6 July 2007	At Devinuwara Sinhasana Mawatha	
Rampart and ammunition store, adjacent to Matara Star Fort		Matara town	Uyanwatta	Matara	6 July 2007		
Wall built during Dutch period		Urubokka	Urubokka South	Pasgoda	25 March 2016		
Asmagoda Purana Vihara		Asmagoda		Akuressa	1 November 1996	Image house	
Aththadassa Raja Maha Vihara		Radawela		Hakmana	1 November 1996	Image house	
Bamunugama Raja Maha Vihara			Bamunugama-East	Mulatiyana	24 July 2009	The Drip-ledged Cave Temple (Len Vihara)	
Devinuwara Raja Maha Vihara		Devinuwara		Devinuwara			
Devinuwara Upulwan Devalaya			Number 433c Devinuwara	Devinuwara	8 April 2009	Dewinuwara Upulwan Dewale Premises and its buildings and other Archaeological remains situated in the Sinhasana Devale Premises within the limits	
Dutch Reformed Church			No. 416C, Fort	Matara	15 April 2016	In the premises of Matara Fort	
Elamaldeniya Raja Maha Vihara		Elamaldeniya		Pitabeddara	1 November 1996	Image house	
Elgiriya Raja Maha Vihara		kahavilgoda	Elgiriya	Akuressa	15 April 2016	Inner shrine with frescoes and sculptures of the shrine	
Emaladeniya Raja Maha Vihara		Asmagoda		Akuressa			
Ethkanda Purana Vihara		Galagoda	kamburugamuwa North	Weligama	15 April 2016	Ruins of buildings and other archeological evidences found in the lands situated in the West and South West and drip ledged cave in the premises	
Galkanda Purana Vihara		Bambrenda	No. 441, Bambarenda West	Dickwella	15 April 2016	Shrine in the premises	
Gandara Maha Walawwa			Gandara-Central	Devinuwara	17 May 2013		
Gandara Raja Maha Vihara		Gandara		Devinuwara	1 November 1996	Image house	
Godapitiya Mohideen Jumma Mosque			No. 308 Godapitiya	Athuraliya	30 December 2011	The ‘Dharga’ part	
Kalugala Purana Vihara		Deiyandara		Mulatiyana	1 November 1996	Image house	
Kamburupitiya Sri Sudharmarama Purana Vihara		Ganetenna	Narandeniya	Kamburupitiya	24 July 2009	Sanghavasa (dwelling house)	
Kanuketigoda Poorwarama Vihara		Kanuketigoda		Thihagoda	1 November 1996	Image house	
Kirthi Sri Thejovanarama Vihara		Pallawela	Kithsiripura	Mulatiyana	24 July 2009	The Pirith Mandapaya (Pirith chanting chamber) and the two Sanghavasa (dwelling house) Buildings	
Kolawenigama Raja Maha Vihara			No. 240A, Kolawenigama	Kotapola	24 July 2009	Image house, Bodhighara (Bodhi Tree shrine) and the Vihara Maluwa with the wall now in ruins	
Kowilakanda Purana Vihara		Weligama	Palalla	Welipitiya	6 July 2007	Image House	
Kushtarajagala				Weligama		This colossal image of Avalokiteshvara	
Matara square wall		Matara town		Matara	18 January 1974		
Old Nupe Market		Nupe		Matara		Colonial open-sided market building	
Padinnoruwa Vihara		Ranchagoda		Mulatiyana	1 November 1996	Image house	
Polwatta Gangarama Vihara		Polwatta		Weligama	5 February 1965	Image house	
Rajakula Wadana Raja Maha Vihara		Weligama		Weligama	23 February 2007	Image house with paintings, sculptures and chethiya	
Rajjura Bandara Devalaya				Athuraliya	24 July 2009	Drip-ledged cave temple (Len Viharaya) with rock inscription	
Rotumba Budugala Raja Maha Vihara			Galketa Kanda	Pasgoda	24 July 2009	Two Drip-Ledged cave temples	
Ruwankanda Raja Maha Vihara		Hakmana	Dangala-West	Pitabeddara	24 July 2009	The Drip-ledged Cave Temple (Len Vihara)	
Sarammudali Walauwa		Nupe		Matara	18 October 1996	At Rahula College premises	
Star fort		Matara town		Matara	18 January 1974		
Sri Chethiyarama purana vihara		Penatiyama	No. 394-B-Penatiyama West	Welipitiya	6 June 2008	Buddha shrine	
Sri Sudharmarama Vihara, Hikgoda		Hikgoda		Akuressa	12 June 2015	Chaityaand Shrine	
Sri Sudharshanarama Vihara		Godapitiya	Thibbotuwawa North	Athuraliya	24 July 2009	Image house with paintings	
Sudarshanabimbharama Vihara		Kottegoda		Dickwella	7 December 2001	Image house	
Building in Gelisvenaroy watte			Fort (GND No. 416/C)	Matara	17 May 2013	Located in the land known as Gelisvenaroy watte Central Road in Fort	
The Archaic House bearing Assessment No. 31			Matara Fort	Matara	24 July 2009	Wilfred Gunasekara Mawatha	
The Archaic house bearing Assessment No. 42			Matara Fort	Matara	24 July 2009	Wilfred Gunasekara Mawatha	
The Archaic Walawwa			Matara Fort	Matara	24 July 2009	Siri Dharmarama Mawatha	
The building in which Matara Land Registry is housed			Matara Fort	Matara	22 July 2011		
The coast view building			Matara Fort	Matara	24 July 2009	At Fort Cross Road	
The Governor's Official Residence			Matara Fort	Matara	24 July 2009	At the Army Camp Premises, Wilfred Gunasekara Mawatha	
The house in which female Poet Gajaman Nona lived			Veragampita	Matara	30 December 2011		
The special detention cell of the Prison			Matara Fort	Matara	22 July 2011		
The VIP Bungalow at the venue called ‘Jamson Gaha Gedara”			Matara Fort	Matara	24 July 2009	At Sri Dharmarama Road	
Thorawita Raja Maha Vihara		Hakmana	Narawelpita-South	Hakmana	24 July 2009	The Tampita Viharaya (Viharaya built on stone piles) and Avasa Geya (dwelling house) with paintings and sculptures	
Umangala Raja Maha Vihara		Hakmana	Gangodagama	Hakmana	6 June 2008	The stone well, dagoba and two inscriptions	
Vidyanikethana Piriven Vihara		Sapugoda		Kamburupitiya	1 November 1996	Image house	
Vilayaya Purana Raja Maha Vihara		Dampahala	Dampahala West	Pasgoda	24 July 2009	Tampita (built on stone piles) Image house	
Weluwanarama Purana Vihara		Wehella	No. 445 A, Wehella North	Dickwella	15 April 2016	Shrine with frescoes in the premises	
Weragampita Raja Maha Vihara		Weragampita	No. 417, Uyanwaththa North	Matara	15 April 2016	Grave monument of Koratota thera and shrine in the premises	
Wijayabahu Raja Maha Vihara		Molokgamuwa, Thunbewula		Pasgoda	24 July 2009	The Drip-ledged cave temple (Len Viharaya)	
