= List of Mahinda College alumni =

This is a list of notable Old Mahindians, they being the alumni of Mahinda College, Galle, Sri Lanka.

== Politics ==
Name	Notability	Reference
W. D. S. Abeygoonawardena	member parliament (Galle 1960), Mayor of Galle (1965–1966)	
Lakshman Yapa Abeywardena	member parliament (Matara 1994–2015, National List 2015–present)	
Vajira Abeywardena	member parliament (Galle 1994–2010, 2015–present)	
Henry Woodward Amarasuriya	Deputy Speaker (1948), member parliament (Baddegama 1948–1952), member State Council of Ceylon (Udugama 1931–1935, Galle 1936–1947) Founder member and First General Secretary of United National Party	
Thomas Amarasuriya	member Senate of Ceylon (1953–1965), President of the Senate of Ceylon (1963–1965)	
P. Gamini Ariyatilake	member parliament (Maskeliya 1970–1977)	
I. A. Cader	member parliament (Beruwala 1960–1965, 1970–1977), Deputy Speaker(1970–1977)	
Mohamed Shums Cassim	member of Senate of Ceylon 1953–1954	
Wijaya Dahanayake	member parliament (Matara 2010–present)	
Albert de Silva	member parliament (Galle 1977–1979, Kamburupitiya 1979–1983)	
D. S. Goonesekera	member parliament (Udugama 1956–1960, Habaraduwa 1960–1964)	
Sirisena Hettige	member parliament (Hakmana 1965–1970)	
Leslie Mervyn Jayaratna	Governor of Southern Province (1993–1994)	
Rupa Karunathilake	member parliament (Bentara-Elpitiya 1977–2000)	
Ananda Kularatne	member parliament (Hambantota 1983–2004)	
Semage Salman Kulatileke	member parliament (1972–1977)	
M. G. Mendis	member parliament (Rathgama 1970–1977), pioneer Trade Union Leader	
Nishantha Muthuhettigamage	member parliament (Galle 2010–present)	
Manusha Nanayakkara	member parliament (Galle 2010–present)	
Eranga Weeraratne	member parliament (2024–present), Deputy Minister of Digital Economy (2024–present)	
Lionel Premasiri	member parliament (Galle 2004–2010), Mayor of Galle (1997–2001, 2002–2004)	
V. G. W. Ratnayake	member parliament (Deniyaya 1947 –1956)	
S. A. Wickramasinghe	member State Council of Ceylon (Morawaka 1931–1936), founder Communist Party of Sri Lanka (1943)	
Justin Wijayawardhene	member parliament (Matara 1960) Founder Member of the United National Party	

== Education ==
Name	Notability	Reference
Vini Vitharana	Sri Lankan linguist, academic and scholar	
Harishchandra Abeygunawardena	Vice Chancellor University of Peradeniya (2006–2009)	
M. B. Ariyapala	Emeritus Professor, President/Vice Chancellor University of Colombo (Colombo Campus) (1972–1977)	
Lionel Edirisinghe	Vice Chancellor University of the Visual & Performing Arts (1953-?)	
Kapila Gunasekara	Vice Chancellor University of Peradeniya (2000–2006) First Vice Chancellor University of Vocational Technology	
David Kalupahana	Senior Professor of Philosophy, University of Hawaii	
Nandadasa Kodagoda	Vice Chancellor University of Colombo (1994)	
G. P. Samarawickrama	Vice Chancellor University of Ruhuna (1984–?)	

== Religion ==
Name	Notability	Reference
Mitirigala Dhammanisanthi Thera (formerly known as Asoka Weeraratna)	Buddhist missionary, founder German Dharmaduta Society (1952), Berlin Buddhist Vihara (1957), Mitirigala Nissarana Vanaya (1967)	
Katukurunde Nanananda Thera	Buddhist monk/scholar, abbot of Pothgulgala Aranya	
Madihe Pannaseeha Thero	Buddhist monk, head of Amarapura Nikaya (1969–2003)	

== Military ==
Name	Notability	Reference
Basil Gunasekara	Admiral, Commander of the Navy (1973–1979)	
Monath Perera †	Squadron leader, No. 10 Squadron SLAF	
Lucky Wijayaratne †	Major General, Commander 22 Brigade (Sri Lanka Light Infantry)	

== Sports ==
Name	Notability	Reference
Douglas Dias Jayasinha	All Ceylon cricket player (1937–1945), Chairman Selection Committee Sri Lanka Cricket (1963–1973)	
Kosala Sahabandu	Olympic athlete (1980 4 × 400 relay), Asian Games athlete (1974 4 × 400 relay - gold medal)	
Lasith Malinga	international cricket player (2004–2020), Sri Lanka ODI and T20 captain	
Marvan Atapattu	international cricket player (1990–2007), Sri Lanka ODI and Test captain	
Athula Samarasekera	international cricket player (1983–1994)	
Jayananda Warnaweera	international cricket player (1986–1994)	
Upul Chandana	international cricket player (1994–2007)	
Premachandra de Silva	All Ceylon cricket player (1961–1969)	
Somachandra de Silva	international cricket player (1982–1984), Chairman Sri Lanka Cricket (2009–2011)	
Stanley de Silva	One Day International cricket player (1979)	
Thikshila de Silva	Twenty20 International cricket player (2017)	
Dandeniya Hemachandra de Silva	first class cricket player (1968–1974)	
Rumesh Buddika	first class cricket player (2010–present)	
Nisala Tharaka	first class cricket player (2011–present)	
Dileepa Wickramasinghe	first class cricket player (1985–1996)	
Dinura Kalupahana	first class cricket player & Sri Lanka Under-19s Captain	

== Arts and Media ==
Name	Notability	Reference
Gunadasa Amarasekara	poet, author	
Edwin Ariyadasa	journalist, newspaper editor	
D. B. Dhanapala	journalist, author	
Siri Gunasinghe	poet, author	
Dhamma Jagoda	theater/television director, actor	
Buddhi Wickrama	film, theater and television actor	
Vimukthi Jayasundara	film director, screenwriter, visual artist	
Lionel Deraniyagala	actor	

== Science ==
Name	Notability	Reference
Athula Attygalle	Sri Lankan American Scientist	
Bandula Wijay	Sri Lankan American inventor businessman, and diplomat	

== Others ==
Name	Notability	Reference
Ranjit Abeysuriya	Chairman National Police Commission, Director Public Prosecutions Attorney General's Department	
Anil Jasinghe	medical administrator, Secretary to the Ministry of Environment of Sri Lanka	
A. T. Ariyaratne	founder/president Sarvodaya Shramadana Movement (1958), peace activist	
C. G. Uragoda	physician, medical researcher, author, folklorist, historian, conservationist	
Saman Weerasinghe	ambassador to Russian Federation	
A. P. de Zoysa	social reformer, buddhist scholar	
