= David Wanigasekera =

Ceylonese businessman and politician

David Wanigasekera (1860 - 1955) was Ceylonese businessman and politician.

Wanigasekera was educated at Rahula College in Matara. In 1912 he established the Nandana Tea Plantation in Akuressa, near the Nilwala River. In 1920 he established the Uruwala Tea Factory in Thalahagama, which is one of the country's oldest operating low country tea factories .

In 1931 he was elected to the 1st State Council of Ceylon representing Weligama. On 29 February 1936 he was re-elected to the 2nd State Council of Ceylon, where he served as a member of the Executive Committee on Education.

Wanigasekera ran as the United National Party candidate at the 1st parliamentary election in 1947 for the seat of Akuressa. He lost to W. Wickremasinghe, the brother of Dr. S. A. Wickremasinghe (leader of the Communist Party of Ceylon), by 7,326 votes (only securing 28.4% of the total vote).

His son, D. C. Wanigasekera, also unsuccessfully contested the seat of Akuressa at the 3rd parliamentary election in April 1956, the 4th parliamentary election held on 19 March 1960 and the 5th parliamentary election held on 20 July 1960 for the United National Party. Losing on all three occasions to Dr. S. A. Wickramasinghe.
