= List of St Joseph's College, Colombo alumni =

This is a list of notable Josephian, alumni of St. Joseph's College, Colombo, Sri Lanka.

== Politicians ==
Name	Notability	Reference
Ranasinghe Premadasa	President of Sri Lanka (1989–1993), Prime Minister of Sri Lanka (1978–1979), member parliament – Colombo Central (1965–1985)	
Mohamed Amin Didi	First President of the Maldives (1953)	
Nirj Deva	Member of the European Parliament – South East England (1999–2019), member of the British parliament – Brentford and Isleworth (1992–1997)	
Albert Peries	Speaker of the Parliament of Sri Lanka	
Lalitha Rajapakse	First Minister of Justice In Sri Lanka (1947-1953), Member of the Senate of Ceylon	
K. W. Devanayagam	Minister of Justice (1977-1980)	
M. V. P. Peiris	Minister of Health (1960)	
G. G. Ponnambalam	Minister of Industries, Industrial Research and Fisheries (1948-1953) Member State Council of Ceylon (1934–1947), member parliament – Jaffna (1947–1960, 1965–1970)	
Edwin Wijeyeratne	Minister of Home Affairs (1948-1951), Member Senate of Ceylon (1947–1951)	
M. Sivasithamparam	Deputy Speaker/ Member of Parliament (1968-1970)	
C. Suntharalingam	Minister of Trade and Commerce (1947)	
Hector Fernando	Member parliament – Negombo (1956–1960)	
A. Ekanayake Gunasinha	Mayor of Colombo (1940-1943)	
C.E. Attygalle	Member Parliament- Ratnapura	
Naganather Canaganayagam	Mayor of Kandy (1942)	
Mahanama Samaraweera	Minister of Local Government and Housing (1960-1964)	
Velusami Radhakrishnan	State Minister of Education (2015)	
Alfred Thambiayah	Member of Parliament- Kayts (1947-1956)	
Don Roy Rajapakse	Member of Parliament - Hakmana (1960-1965)	
Doric de Souza	Trotskyist Politician and Senator (1914-1987)	
V. A. Kandiah	Member of Parliament (1956-1963)	
C. H. Z. Fernando	Member of the Legislative Council of Ceylon (1924-1929)	
Bernard Jayasuriya	Ceylonese businessman and politician	
Neal de Alwis	Deputy Minister of Public Administration, Local Government and Home Affairs(1970-75)	
Neomal Perera	Deputy Minister of External Affairs (2010-2015)	
John Amaratunga	Minister of Tourism (2015-2019), Minister of Land (2016-2017), Minister of Interior (2001-2003)	
Harin Fernando	Minister of Tourism and Lands (2022–Present) Member parliament – Badulla (2010–2014, 2015–2019), Chief Minister of Uva Province (2015)	

== Legal ==
Name	Notability	Reference
Hugh Norman Gregory Fernando	Chief Justice Of Ceylon (1966-1973)	
Mohan Peiris	Chief Justice (2013–2015), (Note: Although Peiris studied partially at St. Joseph's College is not a member of the Old Boys Union. In January 2015 Peiris' appointment was declared void by government of Sri Lanka) Attorney General (2008–2011)	
Priyasath Dep	Chief Justice (2017–present) Solicitor General (2007–2011), Justice of the Supreme Court (2011–present)	
Sir Francis Soetsz	Acting Chief Justice (1946)	
P. Ramanathan	Puisne Justice Of the Supreme Court of Sri Lanka	
K. Palakidnar	President Of the Court Of Appeal of Sri Lanka (1987)	
Mark Fernando	Supreme Court Judge (1988–2005)	
Dappula De Livera	Attorney General of Sri Lanka (2019-2021)	
A. W. H. Abeyesundere	former acting Attorney General of Sri Lanka and judge of the Supreme Court of Sri Lanka	
N. Nadarajah	Supreme Court Judge	

== Religion ==
Name	Notability	Reference
Thomas Cooray	Cardinal (1965–1988), Archbishop of Colombo (1947–1976)	
Oswald Gomis	Archbishop of Colombo (2002–2009), Chancellor University of Colombo (2002–present)	
Edmund Pieris	Bishop of Chilaw (1940–1972)	
Anthony de Saram	Bishop of Galle (1964–1982)	

== Academics ==
Name	Notability	Reference
Oswald Gomis	Chancellor University of Colombo	
Cyril Ponnamperuma	Vidya Jyothi, Professor, Scientist, Chemist at NASA	
Don Carlin Gunawardena	Botanist, Head of the Department of Science Vidyodaya University	
Eric Karunanayake	Founder & First Director of the Institute of Molecular Biology and Biochemistry in Sri Lanka(IBMBB) Chairman National Research Council of Sri Lanka (2005-2013)	
Roland Silva	Former Commissioner of Archaeology (1983-1990),Pioneer Founder Director General of the Central Cultural Fund, former Chancellor of the University of Moratuwa	
William Arthur Edward Karunaratne	Former Dean of Faculty of Medicine, University of Ceylon	
Carlo Fonseka	Former Dean Faculty of Medicine University of Kelaniya	
Mahasara Gunaratne	Former Dean Faculty of Medicine University of Peradeniya	
Doric de Souza	politician, Senator, Professor of English and Marxist theoretician	
W. L. Jeyasingham	Former Dean of the Faculty of Arts, University of Jaffna	
C.J. Eliezer	Professor of mathematics at University of Ceylon	
Philip Nehri Mullegama	Corporate trainer, personality development coach	

== Medicine ==
Name	Notability	Reference
Carlo Fonseka	Professor, PresidentSri Lanka Medical Council (2013–2018),	
Neville Cooray	Surgeon, doctor in the field of radiotherapy, served as Vice President of the Sri Lanka Cancer Society.	

== Arts ==
Name	Notability	Reference
Arthur Basnayake	Ceylon's High Commissioner to India	
Marcelline Jayakody	Lyricsist, Composer	
J. P. de Fonseka	Essayist, editor	
Dayan Jayatilleka	Academic, diplomat, author	
Annesley Malewana	Singer, composer	
Daya Wimalaweera	Filmmaker, producer	
Roy de Silva	Actor, filmmaker, producer	
Shesha Palihakkara	Actor, dancer, producer	
J. P. Chandrababu	Actor	
Roshan Ranawana	Actor	
Mark Samaranayake	Actor	
Laddie Ranasinghe	Actor	
Annesley Dias	Actor	
Nihal De Silva	Author	
Gratien Ananda	Singer	
Lionel de Fonseka	Author	
Sajitha Anthony	Actor	

== Military ==
Name	Notability	Reference
Anton Muttukumaru	Major General, First Ceylonese Commander of the Army (1955–1959)	
Royce De mel	Rear Admiral, First Ceylonese Commander of the Navy (1955-1961)	
Maurice de Mel	Chief of Staff of the Sri Lanka Army and Commandant of the Volunteer Force	
Mohan Jayamaha	Rear Admiral Sri Lanka Navy	
H. W. G. Wijeyekoon	Major General Commander of the Army (1960–1963)	
Janaka Perera	Major General Chief of Staff (2000–2001)	
G. H. De Silva	Major General Commander of the Army (Sri Lanka) (1994–1996)	
Hugh Fred Rupasinghe	Senior Sri Lanka Army officer,Former Commander Security Forces Headquarters - Jaffna	
Tyron Silvapulle	Wing Commander Sri Lanka Air Force (1986 – 1999) (The only recipient of the Parama Weera Vibhushanaya award from the Sri Lanka Air Force.)	

== Police ==
Name	Notability	Reference
Ernest Perera	Inspector General of Police (Sri Lanka) (1988–1993)	
Lakdasa Kodituwakku	Inspector General of Police (Sri Lanka) (1998–2002)	

== Business ==
Name	Notability	Reference
Merrill J. Fernando	Founder of the global tea company Dilmah	
Asoka Peiris	CEO, Singer plc	
Roshan Perera	Entrepreneur, Business Magnate, Investor, Philanthropist	
Dharshan Munidasa	Sri Lanka's most renowned chef-restaurateur, and the mastermind behind some of the best restaurants in the country including Nihonbashi and Ministry of Crab	

== Sports ==
Name	Notability	Reference
Ashley de Silva	International cricket player (1993)	
Don Jayasundera	Ceylon cricket player	
Malcolm Spittle	Captained Ceylon Cricket team	
Chaminda Vaas	International cricket player (1994–2009)	
Angelo Mathews	International cricket player (2009–present)	
Thisara Perera	International cricket player (2009–present)	
Dimuth Karunaratne	International cricket player (2012–present)	
Norton Fredrick	First-class cricket player (Note: Fredrick played for the All Ceylon team before Sri Lanka obtained Test status)	
Dunith Wellalage	International cricket player (2022–present)	
Michael Vandort	International cricket player (2001-2008)	
Sadeera Samarawickrama	International cricket player (2017–present)	
Priyamal Perera	International cricket player	
Ajith Weerakkody	International cricket player	
Peter Ranasinghe	Former Captain of Sri Lanka national football team	
Shevon Daniel	International cricket player	
