= Akuressa Electoral District =

Electoral district of Sri Lanka

Akuressa electoral district was an electoral district of Sri Lanka between August 1947 and February 1989. The district was named after the town of Akuressa in Matara District, Southern Province. The 1978 Constitution of Sri Lanka introduced the proportional representation electoral system for electing members of Parliament. The existing 160 mainly single-member electoral districts were replaced with 22 multi-member electoral districts. Akuressa electoral district was replaced by the Matara multi-member electoral district at the 1989 general elections, the first under the proportional representation system.

== Members of Parliament ==
Key

Independent UNP Communist Party

Election	Member	Party	Term
1947	W. Wickremasinghe	Independent	1947-1952
1952	D. Y. Wickremasinghe	Communist Party of Ceylon	1952-1956
1956	S. A. Wickramasinghe	Communist Party of Ceylon	1956-1960
1960 (March)	S. A. Wickramasinghe	Communist Party of Ceylon	1960
1960 (July)	S. A. Wickramasinghe	Communist Party of Ceylon	1960-1965
1965	S. A. Wickramasinghe	Communist Party of Ceylon	1965-1970
1970	S. A. Wickramasinghe	Communist Party of Ceylon	1970-1977
1977	Dayananda Wickremasinghe	United National Party	1977-1989

== Elections ==
=== 1947 Parliamentary General Election ===
Results of the 1st parliamentary election held between 23 August 1947 and 20 September 1947:

Candidate	Party	Symbol	Votes	%
W. Wickremasinghe	Independent	Elephant	13,458	62.34
David Wanigasekera	United National Party	Cartwheel	6,132	28.40
H. P. D. Karunaratne	Independent	Hand	1,453	6.73
Valid Votes			21,043	97.47
Rejected Votes			546	2.53
Total Polled			21,589	100.00
Registered Electors			45,886	
Turnout				47.05

=== 1952 Parliamentary General Election ===
Results of the 2nd parliamentary election held between 24 May 1952 and 30 May 1952:

Candidate	Party	Symbol	Votes	%
D. Y. Wickremasinghe	Communist Party of Ceylon	Star	16,626	50.92
C. Wijesinghe	United National Party	Elephant	15,625	47.85
Valid Votes			32,251	98.78
Rejected Votes			400	1.22
Total Polled			32,651	100.00
Registered Electors			43,234	
Turnout				75.52

=== 1956 Parliamentary General Election ===
Results of the 3rd parliamentary election held between 5 April 1956 and 10 April 1956:

Candidate	Party	Symbol	Votes	%
S. A. Wickramasinghe	Communist Party of Ceylon	Star	20,867	58.35
D. C. Wanigasekera	United National Party	Elephant	14,639	40.94
Valid Votes			35,506	99.29
Rejected Votes			254	0.71
Total Polled			35,760	100.00
Registered Electors			51,365	
Turnout				69.62

=== 1960 (March) Parliamentary General Election ===
Results of the 4th parliamentary election held on 19 March 1960:

Candidate	Party	Symbol	Votes	%
S. A. Wickramasinghe	Communist Party of Ceylon	Star	13,191	55.15
D. C. Wanigasekera	United National Party	Elephant	10,290	43.02
K. F. Ratnasekera		Umbrella	270	1.13
Valid Votes			23,751	99.30
Rejected Votes			167	0.70
Total Polled			23,918	100.00
Registered Electors			29,973	
Turnout				79.80

=== 1960 (July) Parliamentary General Election ===
Results of the 5th parliamentary election held on 20 July 1960:

Candidate	Party	Symbol	Votes	%
S. A. Wickramasinghe	Communist Party of Ceylon	Star	12,488	54.34
D. C. Wanigasekera	United National Party	Elephant	10,038	43.68
N. H. Ariyasiri Yapa		Cartwheel	337	1.47
Valid Votes			22,863	99.48
Rejected Votes			120	0.52
Total Polled			22,983	100.00
Registered Electors			29,973	
Turnout				76.68

=== 1965 Parliamentary General Election ===
Results of the 6th parliamentary election held on 22 March 1965:

Candidate	Party	Symbol	Votes	%
S. A. Wickremasinghe	Communist Party of Ceylon	Star	16,096	52.54
C. A. Dharmapala	United National Party	Elephant	13,722	44.79
M. Karunadasa		Cartwheel	672	2.19
Valid Votes			30,490	99.52
Rejected Votes			147	0.48
Total Polled			30,637	100.00
Registered Electors			36,263	
Turnout				84.49

=== 1970 Parliamentary General Election ===
Results of the 7th parliamentary election held on 27 May 1970:

Candidate	Party	Symbol	Votes	%
S. A. Wickremasinghe	Communist Party of Sri Lanka	Star	20,007	57.86
V. P. A. Abeysinghe	Sri Lanka Freedom Party	Hand	14,466	41.83
Valid Votes			34,473	99.69
Rejected Votes			107	0.31
Total Polled			34,580	100.00
Registered Electors			40,078	
Turnout				86.28

=== 1977 Parliamentary General Election ===
Results of the 8th parliamentary election held on 21 July 1977:

Candidate	Party	Symbol	Votes	%
Dayananda Wickremasinghe	United National Party	Elephant	25,739	57.05
S. A. Wickremasinghe	Communist Party of Sri Lanka	Star	16,436	36.43
H. G. Sirisena	Sri Lanka Freedom Party	Hand	2,836	6.29
Valid Votes			45,011	99.76
Rejected Votes			108	0.24
Total Polled			45,119	100.00
Registered Electors			50,778	
Turnout				88.86
