= Hakmana =

Hakmana may refer to the following topics in Sri Lanka:

- Hakmana, Kandy
- Hakmana, Matara
  - Hakmana Electoral District, 1947-1989
