= Agarawala Grama Niladhari Division =

Agarawala
- Grama Niladhari Division
- Interactive map of Agarawala
- Coordinates: 5.989862°N 80.603879°E
- Country: Sri Lanka
- Province: Southern Province
- District: Matara District
- Divisional Secretariat: Devinuwara Divisional Secretariat
- Electoral District: Matara Electoral District
- Polling Division: Devinuwara Polling Division

Area
  - Total: 2.2 km^{2} (0.85 sq mi)
- Elevation: 75 m (246 ft)

Population (2012)
  - Total: 700
  - Density: 318/km^{2} (820/sq mi)
- ISO 3166 code: LK-3245040

Agarawala

Agarawala Grama Niladhari Division is a Grama Niladhari Division of the Devinuwara Divisional Secretariat of Matara District of Southern Province, Sri Lanka. It has Grama Niladhari Division Code 448C.

Agarawala is surrounded by the Uda Aparekka, Beddegammedda, Kokawala, Kekanadura East, Deeyagaha East and Palle Aparekka Grama Niladhari Divisions.

== Demographics ==
=== Ethnicity ===
The Agarawala Grama Niladhari Division has a Sinhalese majority (100.0%). In comparison, the Devinuwara Divisional Secretariat (which contains the Agarawala Grama Niladhari Division) has a Sinhalese majority (98.4%)

Ethnicity in Agarawala
1. Sinhalese (100.0%)
2. Other (0.00%)

=== Religion ===
The Agarawala Grama Niladhari Division has a Buddhist majority (99.7%). In comparison, the Devinuwara Divisional Secretariat (which contains the Agarawala Grama Niladhari Division) has a Buddhist majority (98.1%)

Religion in Agarawala
1. Buddhist (99.7%)
2. Other (0.30%)
