= Horagala West (Kotapola) Grama Niladhari Division =

Horagala West
- Grama Niladhari Division
- Interactive map of Horagala West
- Coordinates: 6.263542°N 80.537676°E
- Country: Sri Lanka
- Province: Southern Province
- District: Matara District
- Divisional Secretariat: Kotapola Divisional Secretariat
- Electoral District: Matara Electoral District
- Polling Division: Deniyaya Polling Division

Area
  - Total: 6.23 km^{2} (2.41 sq mi)
- Elevation: 507 m (1,663 ft)

Population (2012)
  - Total: 1,693
  - Density: 272/km^{2} (700/sq mi)
- ISO 3166 code: LK-3206170

Horagala West

Horagala West Grama Niladhari Division is a Grama Niladhari Division of the Kotapola Divisional Secretariat of Matara District of Southern Province, Sri Lanka. It has Grama Niladhari Division Code 256D.

Horagala West is a surrounded by the Ilukpitiya, Horagala East, Paragala, Uvaragala, Waralla, Koodaludeniya, Kotapola South and Lindagawahena Grama Niladhari Divisions.

== Demographics ==
=== Ethnicity ===
The Horagala West Grama Niladhari Division has a Sinhalese majority (86.3%). In comparison, the Kotapola Divisional Secretariat (which contains the Horagala West Grama Niladhari Division) has a Sinhalese majority (80.9%) and a significant Indian Tamil population (12.6%)

Ethnicity in Horagala West
1. Sinhalese (86.3%)
2. Sri Lankan Tamil (7.50%)
3. Indian Tamil (6.10%)
4. Other (0.10%)

=== Religion ===
The Horagala West Grama Niladhari Division has a Buddhist majority (86.0%) and a significant Hindu population (10.3%). In comparison, the Kotapola Divisional Secretariat (which contains the Horagala West Grama Niladhari Division) has a Buddhist majority (80.9%) and a significant Hindu population (14.9%)

Religion in Horagala West
1. Buddhist (86.0%)
2. Hindu (10.3%)
3. Other Christian (2.50%)
4. Roman Catholic (1.10%)
5. Other (0.10%)
