= Percy Wickremasinghe =

Sri Lankan politician (1960–1987)

Hon. Percy Wickremasinghe MP

Member of the Ceylon Parliament for Kamburupitiya District
- In office 1960–1970
- Preceded by: seat created
- Succeeded by: A. M. Nanayakkara

Personal details
- Born: 27 March 1918
- Died: 26 November 1987 (aged 69)
- Party: Ceylon Communist Party
- Relations: Sugiswara Wickramasinghe (brother)

Percy Abeywardhana Wickremasinghe (27 March 1918 – 26 November 1987) was a Sri Lankan politician.

Wickremasinghe first contested for parliament at the 3rd parliamentary election in 1956, representing the Ceylon Communist Party in the Hakmana Electoral District but was defeated by the United National Party candidate, C. A. Dharmapala.

Wickremasinghe was elected at the 4th parliamentary election in March 1960, in the newly created seat of Kamburupitiya, polling 9,442 votes (41%). He retained the seat in the subsequent elections in July that year, increasing his margin by 20% securing 61% of the vote. He ran again at the parliamentary elections in 1965 holding on to the seat with a reduced margin of 57% of the vote, however he did not contest the 1970 parliamentary elections.
