= Aththa =

Newspaper of the Communist Party of Sri Lanka

Aththa ඇත්ත
- Type: Weekly
- Founder(s): B.A. Siriwardena, H.G.S. Ratnaweera
- Publisher: Pragathi Press (Pvt.) Ltd
- Editor-in-chief: Jinadasa Kankanamge
- Associate editor: Aga Jayasena, Bennette Rupasinghe, Richard Wijesiri, Sirilal Kodikara
- Staff writers: Jiffrey Yoonoos, Saman Jayakody, Dakshina Kankanamge, Widuneth Siyambalapitiya, Chalaka Lunuwilage, Saalani Abeysundara, Danushi Jayawardhana
- Founded: 1964
- Ceased publication: 1995
- Relaunched: 2016
- Political alignment: Communism; Marxism–Leninism
- Language: Sinhala
- Headquarters: Colombo
- Circulation: 5,000 (Now) (41,000 in 1971)
- Sister newspapers: Forward, Deshabhimani
- Website: www.aththa.lk

Aththa (Sinhala: ඇත්ත, 'Truth') was a Sinhala-language daily newspaper, published from Colombo by the Communist Party of Sri Lanka between 1964 and 1995. The name was borrowed from the Russian newspaper Pravda. As of 1971, it had an edition of around 41,000. It had a special Sunday edition. As of the early 1970s, B.A. Siriwardena served as editor-in-chief of the newspaper, Newton Seneviratne as its news editor and Surath Ambalangoda as its features editor. As of the mid-1980s, H.G.S. Ratnaweera was the editor-in-chief of Aththa.

== History ==
Aththa emerged as an important new element of Sinhala journalism. The financial backing the publication received from the Communist Party was an important reason behind its impact. But the style of journalism and coverage of day-to-day affairs were also notably different from other contemporary publications, and won respect well beyond the party ranks. According to Mervin de Silva, Prime Minister Dudley Senanayake was a frequent reader of Aththa.

The Sunday edition of Aththa in particular became known as a prominent example of vocal journalism. Aththa was known for its "vigorous writing and pithy headlines". Aththa editor H.G.S. Ratnaweera explained that the newspaper was successful because: "[u]nlike many bourgeois publications with their pseudoscholarly and grandiloquent style, Aththa speaks in the simple, direct and pithy language of workers. In many schools, teachers use it as the model of modern Sinhala newspaper style."

Using eye-catching headlines and sensationalist exposés, Aththa ridiculed corruption amongst high-level politicians. When governments censored articles in Aththa, the newspaper responded by leaving vast white spaces in the place of the censored texts. The blank fields would include a small commentary, saying "this news was eaten by dogs". During the time of the United Front government (in which the Communist Party participated), the wording used in a blank space on the front was "our own dogs have chewed us up". At the time, Aththa was controlled by the faction inside the Communist Party which was critical of the United Front coalition.

Aththa was the sole Sinhala-language newspaper to cover the burning of Jaffna library. An Aththa photographer captured the event. Following the publication of the photograph, the government decided to shut down Aththa and Communist Party members were arrested. Soon, however, the government did a volte face and decided to blame the Left for the destruction of the library instead.

Aththa suffered from pressure from governments and also faced persecution: companies were threatened with bad consequences if they advertised in the newspaper and newspaper dealers were pressured not to sell it. In 1992, Aththa cartoonist Jiffrey Yoonoos was stabbed and threatened with death if he did not stop drawing caricatures of President Ranasinghe Premadasa. In the same year, following publication of a testimony regarding the killings by the pro-government 'Black Cat' paramilitary group, a lawsuit was launched against Aththa. The article was based on a list of 830 people who, according to the former head of the Bureau of Special Operations, Deputy Inspector General of Police Premadasa Udugampola, had been killed by the 'Black Cats' between July and November 1989.
