= Wickremasinghe =

Wickremasinghe, Wickremesinghe or Wickramasinghe (Sinhala: වික්‍රමසිංහ, romanized: Vikramasiṁha) is a Sinhalese surname. Notable people with the surname include:

== Surname ==
- Chandra Wickramasinghe (born 1939), British mathematician and astronomer
- Don Martino de Zilva Wickremasinghe (died 1937), Ceylonese epigraphist and archeologist
- Doreen Young Wickremasinghe, Ceylonese politician
- Gamini Wickremasinghe (born 1965), Sri Lankan cricketer
- Jagath Wickramasinghe (born 1966), Sri Lankan musician
- Kumudini Wickremasinghe, Sri Lankan puisne justice of the Supreme Court
- Lakshman Wickremasinghe (1927–1983), Sri Lankan priest
- Maitree Wickramasinghe, Sri Lankan academic
- Martin Wickramasinghe (1890–1976), Ceylonese author
- Mendis Wickramasinghe (born 1976), Sri Lankan herpetologist
- Neela Wickramasinghe (1954–2022), Sri Lankan singer
- Neranjan Wickremasinghe (1961–2015), Sri Lankan politician
- Nira Wickramasinghe (born 1964), Sri Lankan academic
- Pramodya Wickramasinghe (born 1971), Sri Lankan cricketer
- Rajika Wickramasinghe (born 1973), Sri Lankan politician
- Ranil Wickremesinghe (born 1949), Sri Lankan politician
- S. A. Wickramasinghe (1901–1981), Ceylonese politician
- Shelley Wickramasinghe (1926–2011), Sri Lankan cricket official
- Sunitha Wickramasinghe, British physician and academic
- Udaya Wickramasinghe (1939–2010), Sri Lankan cricket official
- Umayangana Wickramasinghe (born 1980), Sri Lankan actress
- W. Wickremasinghe (1899-?), Ceylonese politician

== As a forename ==
- Wickramasinghe Archchilage Chandrawathi (born 1981), Sri Lankan cricketer
- Wickremasinghe Rajaguru (born 1938), Sri Lankan police officer
- Wickremasinghe Wimaladasa (born 1943), Sri Lankan athlete

== See also ==
- Wickramasinghapura, suburb of Colombo, Sri Lanka
