= Pasgoda Grama Niladhari Division =

Pasgoda
- Grama Niladhari Division
- Interactive map of Pasgoda
- Coordinates: 6.243713°N 80.618368°E
- Country: Sri Lanka
- Province: Southern Province
- District: Matara District
- Divisional Secretariat: Pasgoda Divisional Secretariat
- Electoral District: Matara Electoral District
- Polling Division: Hakmana Polling Division

Area
  - Total: 8.0 km^{2} (3.1 sq mi)
- Elevation: 333 m (1,093 ft)

Population (2012)
  - Total: 2,662
  - Density: 333/km^{2} (860/sq mi)
- ISO 3166 code: LK-3209150

Pasgoda

Pasgoda Grama Niladhari Division is a Grama Niladhari Division of the Pasgoda Divisional Secretariat of Matara District of Southern Province, Sri Lanka . It has Grama Niladhari Division Code 254.

Pasgoda is a surrounded by the Saputhanthirikanda, Thalapathkanda, Bengamuwa East, Bengamuwa South, Dampahala East, Napathella and Andaluwa Grama Niladhari Divisions.

== Demographics ==
=== Ethnicity ===
The Pasgoda Grama Niladhari Division has a Sinhalese majority (99.1%) . In comparison, the Pasgoda Divisional Secretariat (which contains the Pasgoda Grama Niladhari Division) has a Sinhalese majority (97.1%)

Ethnicity in Pasgoda
1. Sinhalese (99.1%)
2. Other (0.90%)

=== Religion ===
The Pasgoda Grama Niladhari Division has a Buddhist majority (99.5%) . In comparison, the Pasgoda Divisional Secretariat (which contains the Pasgoda Grama Niladhari Division) has a Buddhist majority (97.1%)

Religion in Pasgoda
1. Buddhist (99.5%)
2. Other (0.50%)
