= Kamburupitiya Electoral District =

Electoral district of Sri Lanka

Kamburupitiya electoral district was an electoral district of Sri Lanka between March 1960 and February 1989. The district was named after the town of Kamburupitiya in Matara District, Southern Province. The 1978 Constitution of Sri Lanka introduced the proportional representation electoral system for electing members of Parliament. The existing 160 mainly single-member electoral districts were replaced with 22 multi-member electoral districts. Kamburupitiya electoral district was replaced by the Matara multi-member electoral district at the 1989 general elections.

== Members of Parliament ==
Key

UNP Communist Party

Election	Member	Party	Term
1960 (March)	Percy Wickremasinghe	Communist Party of Ceylon	1960
1960 (July)	Percy Wickremasinghe	Communist Party of Ceylon	1960-1965
1965	Percy Wickremasinghe	Communist Party of Ceylon	1965-1970
1970	Aelian Mahanaga Nanayakkara	Communist Party of Ceylon	1970-1977
1977	Don Edwin Malawaraarachchi	United National Party	1977-1978
1979 by-election	Albert Silva	United National Party	1979-1983
1983 by-election	Chandrakumara Wijeya Gunawardena	United National Party	1983-1989

== Elections ==
=== 1960 (March) Parliamentary General Election ===
Results of the 4th parliamentary election held on 19 March 1960:

Candidate	Party	Symbol	Votes	%
Percy Wickremasinghe	Communist Party of Ceylon	Star	9,442	41.37
Archie Abeywardena	United National Party	Elephant	6,036	26.45
S. P. Jayawardane	Sri Lanka Freedom Party	Hand	4,414	19.34
Yapa Surasena		Key	2,414	10.58
M. G. Sriyapala		Umbrella	315	1.38
Valid Votes			22,621	99.12
Rejected Votes			202	0.88
Total Polled			22,823	100.00
Registered Electors			29,927	
Turnout				76.26

=== 1960 (July) Parliamentary General Election ===
Results of the 5th parliamentary election held on 20 July 1960:

Candidate	Party	Symbol	Votes	%
Percy Wickremasinghe	Communist Party of Ceylon	Star	14,022	62.19
Archie Abeywardena	United National Party	Elephant	8,433	37.40
Valid Votes			22,455	99.58
Rejected Votes			94	0.42
Total Polled			22,549	100.00
Registered Electors			29,927	
Turnout				75.35

=== 1965 Parliamentary General Election ===
Results of the 6th parliamentary election held on 22 March 1965:

Candidate	Party	Symbol	Votes	%
Percy Wickremasinghe	Communist Party of Ceylon	Star	16,955	57.57
Justin Wijayawardhene	United National Party	Elephant	12,379	41.93
Valid Votes			29,334	99.36
Rejected Votes			189	0.64
Total Polled			29,523	100.00
Registered Electors			36,438	
Turnout				81.02

=== 1970 Parliamentary General Election ===
Results of the 7th parliamentary election held on 27 May 1970:

Candidate	Party	Symbol	Votes	%
Aelian Mahanaga Nanayakkara	Communist Party of Ceylon	Star	21,685	62.95
C. A. Dharmapala	United National Party	Elephant	12,439	36.11
Buddhadasa Rasaputram		Lamp	216	0.63
Valid Votes			34,340	99.69
Rejected Votes			107	0.31
Total Polled			34,447	100.00
Registered Electors			40,548	
Turnout				84.95

=== 1977 Parliamentary General Election ===
Results of the 8th parliamentary election held on 21 July 1977:

In September 1978 Malawaraachchi resigned from the United National Party with the party appointing Albert Silva to the parliamentary seat in November 1979.

Candidate	Party	Symbol	Votes	%
Don Edwin Malawaraarachchi	United National Party	Elephant	22,306	52.30
Aelian Mahanaga Nanayakkara	Communist Party of Ceylon	Star	12,630	29.60
Percy Wickremasinghe	Sri Lanka Freedom Party	Hand	7,539	17.70
Valid Votes			42,475	99.57
Rejected Votes			183	0.43
Total Polled			42,658	100.00
Registered Electors			49,592	
Turnout				86.02

=== 1983 Parliamentary By-Election ===
On 10 February 1983 Albert Silva resigned and a by-election was subsequently conducted. Results of the 1983 Parliamentary by-election, held on 18 May 1983:

Candidate	Party	Symbol	Votes	%
Chandrakumara Wijeya Gunawardena	United National Party	Elephant	22,707	54.66
Aelian Mahanaga Nanayakkara	Communist Party of Ceylon	Star	16,081	38.71
Premachandra Munasinghe		Bell	2,062	4.96
D. E. Arachchi Malawara		Scales	499	1.20
Samsan Mallikarachchi		Eye	106	0.26
Valid Votes			41,455	99.79
Rejected Votes			86	0.21
Total Polled			41,541	100.00
Registered Electors			49,592	
Turnout				83.77
