= Vikram Singh =

Vikram Singh may refer to:

- Vikram Singh (actor) (born 1979), Indian film actor
- Vikram Singh (air marshal) (born 1963), Indian Air Force
- Vikram Singh (composer) (born 1983), Indian singer, composer, director and producer
- Vikram Singh (police officer) (born 1950), Indian educationist and Indian Police Service officer
- Vikram Singh (producer), Indian film producer
- V. R. V. Singh (born 1984), Indian cricketer
- Vikramjit Singh (born 2003), Dutch cricketer
- Vikram Pratap Singh (born 2002), Indian footballer
- Vikram Singh Rathore, fictional character played by Akshay Kumar in the 2012 Indian film Rowdy Rathore
- Vikram Singh (Uttar Pradesh politician), Indian politician from Uttar Pradesh
- Vikram Singh (Madhya Pradesh politician), Indian politician from Madhya Pradesh

== See also ==
- Bikram Singh (disambiguation)
- Vikramsinh Balasaheb Sawant, Indian politician
- Vikramsinh Patankar (born 1943), Indian politician
- Vikramsinhrao Pawar or Shahaji II, Maharaja of Kolhapur from 1947 to 1983
- Wickremasinghe, a Sinhalese name
- Vikrama-simha, a character in the 11th-century Indian story collection Shringara-manjari-katha
- Vikramasimha, a character in the 11th-century Indian story collection Kathasaritsagara
- Vikram Singh Rao II Puar, 10th Maharaja of Dewas State, India
- Kochadaiiyaan, a 2014 Indian Tamil-language film by Soundarya Rajinikanth, titled Vikrama Simha in Telugu
- Vikrama Simhapuri University, Andhra Pradesh, India
