= Jayasinha =

Jayasinha is a surname. Notable people with the surname include:

- Dilruk Jayasinha (born 1985), Sri Lankan Australian comedian
- Douglas Dias Jayasinha (1915–2006), Ceylonese cricketer
