= C. A. Dharmapala =

Sri Lankan politician (1907–1989)

Colonel C. A. Dharmapala OBE, ED

Member of the Ceylon Parliament for Hakmana
- In office 1952–1960
- Preceded by: Premalal Kumarasiri
- Succeeded by: Don Roy Rajapakse

Personal details
- Born: Candauda Arachchige Dharmapala; 4 August 1907 Matara, British Ceylon
- Died: 6 July 1989 (aged 81)
- Party: United National Party
- Relations: Tissa De Silva
- Education: Nalanda College Colombo
- Occupation: Businessmen

Military service
- Allegiance: Sri Lanka
- Branch/service: Ceylon Volunteer Force
- Years of service: 1931-1969
- Rank: Colonel
- Unit: Gemunu Watch

Colonel Candauda Arachchige Dharmapala, OBE, ED (Sinhala: සී.ඒ. ධර්මපාල; 4 August 1907 – 6 July 1989) was a Sri Lankan politician. He was a Parliamentary Secretary to the Minister of Industries, Housing and Social Services and Member of Parliament for Hakmana. He also served as the permanent secretary to the Ministry of Defence, and as Security Adviser to President J. R. Jayewardene.

== Early life ==
Born on 4 August 1907 in Matara to Candauda Arachchige Odiris de Silva and Nonahami Nanayakkara from Dangedara, Galle. His father was a wealthy oil mill owner and a prominent philanthropist having founded Rahula College and Sujatha Vidyalaya. He had four brothers and six sisters. His brothers were C. A. Edvin de Silva, C. A. Ariyathilaka, C. A. Dhanapala and C. A. Harischandra. Harischandra founded Harischandra Mills.

Dharmapala was educated at Rahula College and Nalanda College Colombo, after completing his schooling he joined the family business.

== Military service ==
Dharmapala was commissioned as a Second Lieutenant in the Ceylon Light Infantry, a volunteer regiment in the Ceylon Defence Force in 1931. In 1940, he was mobilised for World War II, serving as Chief Security Officer of the Ratmalana Airport. In 1949, when the Ceylon Army was formed, Captain Dharmapala transferred to the Ceylon Volunteer Force into the 2 (Volunteer) Battalion, Ceylon Light Infantry. In 1950, volunteer detachments were established in Galle and Matara, Captain Dharmapala was put in command of the detachments. In 1954, the Ruhunu Regiment was formed with Captain Dharmapala in command of the B Company based in Galle and Matara. When the Ruhunu Regiment was disbanded by Prime Minister S.W.R.D. Bandaranaike, troops of the B Company were transferred to the newly formed Ceylon Sinha Regiment forming the C Company, 2 (V) Battalion, Ceylon Sinha Regiment which later formed the short-lived Gemunu Regiment which was commanded by Major Dharmapala. The Gemunu Regiment was disbanded and in September 1965 the 3 (V) Battalion, Gemunu Watch was raised in the Matara Fort with Lieutenant Colonel Dharmapala as its Commanding Officer and he served until August 1968, when he retired from the army with the honorary rank of Colonel. He was made an Officer of the Order of the British Empire (OBE) (Military Division) in the 1956 New Year Honours and for his long service as a volunteer officer he received the Efficiency Decoration.

== Political career ==
As a founding member of the United National Party, Dharmapala contested the 1947 general election from the Hakmana electorate but lost to P. Kumarasiri of the Communist Party of Ceylon. On his second attempt he was successful as Dharmapala entered parliament in 1952, having been elected from the Hakmana electorate in the 1952 general election and was appointed as Parliamentary Secretary to the Minister of Industries, Housing and Social Services. He was re-elected in the 1956 general election, becoming only one of eight United National Party members to be elected to parliament after the landslide victory of S.W.R.D. Bandaranaike and his Sri Lanka Freedom Party. Dharmapala was re-elected in the March 1960 general election from the Devinuwara electorate, however, he lost to P. P. Wickremasuriya in the July 1960 general election. He contested the 1965 Ceylonese general election from the Akuressa electorate and lost to S. A. Wickramasinghe and the 1970 general election from the Kamburupitiya electorate, but lost to Aelian Mahanaga Nanayakkara. In the early 1970s, he backed J. R. Jayewardene in his leadership bid for the United National Party against Dudley Senanayake. He was appointed by Prime Minister Jayewardene as Permanent Secretary of the Ministry of Defence on 1 September 1977 and he served until 15 August 1983. Serving as the Security Adviser to President Jayewardene. His tenure saw the start of the Sri Lankan Civil War and the Black July riots. He was succeeded by General D. S. Attygalle.

== See also ==
- List of Sri Lankan non-career Permanent Secretaries
- March 1960 Ceylonese parliamentary election
