= Matara Electoral District (1947–1989) =

Electoral district of Sri Lanka

Matara electoral district was an electoral district of Sri Lanka between August 1947 and February 1989. The district was named after the city of Matara in Matara District, Southern Province. The 1978 Constitution of Sri Lanka introduced the proportional representation electoral system for electing members of Parliament. The existing 160 mainly single-member electoral districts were replaced with 22 multi-member electoral districts. Matara electoral district was replaced by the Matara multi-member electoral district at the 1989 general elections, the first under the proportional representation system, Matara continues to be a polling division of the multi-member electoral district.

== Members of Parliament ==
Key

Independent SLFP UNP Communist Party

Election	Member	Party	Term
1947	H. D. Abeygoonewardane	CCP	1947–1952
1952	Mahanama Samaraweera	CCP	1952–1956
1956	Mahanama Samaraweera	SLFP	1956–1960
1960 (March)	Justin C. Wijayawardhene	UNP	1960
1960 (July)	Mahanama Samaraweera	SLFP	1960–1965
1965	B. Y. Tudawe	CCP	1965–1970
1970	B. Y. Tudawe	CCP	1970–1977
1977	S. K. Piyadasa	UNP	1970–1989

== Elections ==
=== 1947 Parliamentary General Election ===
Results of the 1st parliamentary election held between 23 August 1947 and 20 September 1947:

Candidate	Party	Symbol	Votes	%
H. D. Abeygoonewardane	Communist Party of Ceylon	Pineapple	11,970	57.31
W. Gunasekera		Umbrella	5,279	25.27
G. Weeratunga		Scales	2,261	10.83
K. K. D. Silva		Cartwheel	442	2.12
Valid Votes			20,352	97.44
Rejected Votes			535	2.56
Total Polled			20,887	100.00
Registered Electors			39,930	
Turnout				52.31

=== 1952 Parliamentary General Election ===
Results of the 2nd parliamentary election held between 24 May 1952 and 30 May 1952:

Candidate	Party	Symbol	Votes	%
Mahanama Samaraweera	Communist Party of Ceylon	Star	11,861	42.41
Edward Benjamin Senaratne		Umbrella	10,785	38.56
Suriya Patabendige Albert de Silva		Elephant	2,565	9.17
Yapa Sirisena Rajapaksa		Hand	2,265	8.10
Valid Votes			27,476	98.23
Rejected Votes			494	1.77
Total Polled			27,970	100.00
Registered Electors			41,166	
Turnout				67.94

=== 1956 Parliamentary General Election ===
Results of the 3rd parliamentary election held between 5 April 1956 and 10 April 1956:

Candidate	Party	Symbol	Votes	%
Mahanama Samaraweera	Sri Lanka Freedom Party	Hand	18,571	59.83
D. H. Pandita Gunawardene	United National Party	Elephant	7,342	23.65
E. H. P. Gawrapala		Star	4,894	15.77
Valid Votes			30,807	99.25
Rejected Votes			232	0.75
Total Polled			31,039	100.00
Registered Electors			47,068	
Turnout				65.95

=== 1960 (March) Parliamentary General Election ===
Results of the 4th parliamentary election held on 19 March 1960:

Candidate	Party	Symbol	Votes	%
Justin C. Wijayawardhene	United National Party	Elephant	8,409	36.56
Mahanama Samaraweera	Sri Lanka Freedom Party	Hand	6,533	28.41
B. Y. Tudawe	Communist Party of Ceylon	Star	5,702	24.79
K. K. de Silva		Umbrella	2,151	9.35
Dayananda Kumarapperuma		Eye	204	0.89
Valid Votes			22,999	99.35
Rejected Votes			151	0.65
Total Polled			23,150	100.00
Registered Electors			30,640	
Turnout				75.55

=== 1960 (July) Parliamentary General Election ===
Results of the 5th parliamentary election held on 20 July 1960:

Candidate	Party	Symbol	Votes	%
Mahanama Samaraweera	Sri Lanka Freedom Party	Hand	13,105	56.0
Justin C. Wijayawardhena	United National Party	Elephant	10,200	43.59
Valid Votes			23,305	99.59
Rejected Votes			96	0.41
Total Polled			23,401	100.00
Registered Electors			30,640	
Turnout				76.37

=== 1965 Parliamentary General Election ===
Results of the 6th parliamentary election held on 22 March 1965:

Candidate	Party	Symbol	Votes	%
B. Y. Tudawe	Communist Party of Ceylon	Star	15,207	51.27
Mahanama Samaraweera		Sun	14,287	48.17
Valid Votes			29,494	99.44
Rejected Votes			167	0.56
Total Polled			29,661	100.00
Registered Electors			37,399	
Turnout				79.31

=== 1970 Parliamentary General Election ===
Results of the 7th parliamentary election held on 27 May 1970:

Candidate	Party	Symbol	Votes	%
B. Y. Tudawe	Communist Party of Ceylon	Star	20,764	58.37
S. K. Piyadasa	United National Party	Elephant	14,580	40.98
E. P. Wijethunga		Bell	160	0.45
Valid Votes			35,504	99.80
Rejected Votes			70	0.20
Total Polled			35,574	100.00
Registered Electors			41,751	
Turnout				85.21

=== 1977 Parliamentary General Election ===
Results of the 8th parliamentary election held on 21 July 1977:

Candidate	Party	Symbol	Votes	%
S. K. Piyadasa	United National Party	Elephant	23,222	55.96
B. Y. Tudawe	Communist Party of Ceylon	Star	12,585	30.33
Bandula Abeysuriya	Sri Lanka Freedom Party	Hand	4,781	11.52
V. P. S. Abeysinghe		Eye	623	1.50
Nandasiri Hettiarachchi		Flower	201	0.48
Valid Votes			41,412	99.80
Rejected Votes			84	0.20
Total Polled			41,496	100.00
Registered Electors			48,354	
Turnout				85.82
