= Karaputugala =

Coordinates: 6°05′N 80°36′E

Karaputugala is a village in Matara District, Sri Lanka, 22 kilometers away from Matara. It is about 4 kilometers from Kamburupitiya.
