= Hakmana Electoral District =

Electoral district of Sri Lanka

Hakmana electoral district was an electoral district of Sri Lanka between August 1947 and February 1989. The district was named after the town of Hakmana in Matara District, Southern Province. The 1978 Constitution of Sri Lanka introduced the proportional representation electoral system for electing members of Parliament. The existing 160 mainly single-member electoral districts were replaced with 22 multi-member electoral districts. Hakmana electoral district was replaced by the Matara multi-member electoral district at the 1989 general elections, the first under the proportional representation system.

== Members of Parliament ==
Key

Independent SLFP UNP

Election	Member	Party	Term
1947	P. Kumarasiri	Ceylon Communist Party	1947–1952
1952	C. A. Dharmapala	United National Party	1952–1956
1956	C. A. Dharmapala	United National Party	1956–1960
1960 (March)	Don Roy Rajapakse	Mahajana Eksath Peramuna	1960
1960 (July)	Don Roy Rajapakse	Sri Lanka Freedom Party	1960–1965
1965	Sirisena Hettige	United National Party	1965–1970
1970	Don Roy Rajapakse	Sri Lanka Freedom Party	1970–1977
1977	Harshanath Wanigasekera	United National Party	1977–1989

== Elections ==
=== 1947 Parliamentary General Election ===
Results of the 1st parliamentary election held between 23 August 1947 and 20 September 1947:

Candidate	Party	Symbol	Votes	%
P. Kumarasiri	Ceylon Communist Party	Hand	9,958	39.47
C. A. Dharmapala	United National Party	Elephant	6,152	24.39
Percy Wickremasinghe	Ceylon Communist Party	Star	5,056	20.04
A. F. Wijemanne		Chair	2,365	9.37
C. J. Ranatunga		Cup	816	3.23
P. L. D. W. de Silva		Key	414	1.64
Valid Votes			24,751	98.11
Rejected Votes			476	1.89
Total Polled			25,227	100.00
Registered Electors			44,414	
Turnout				56.8

=== 1952 Parliamentary General Election ===
Results of the 2nd parliamentary election held between 24 May 1952 and 30 May 1952:

Candidate	Party	Symbol	Votes	%
C. A. Dharmapala	United National Party	Elephant	15,762	49.84
S. A. Wickramasinghe	Ceylon Communist Party	Star	12,601	39.84
Leelaratne Ubayawansa Jayasinghe		Hand	2,981	9.43
Valid Votes			31,344	99.10
Rejected Votes			284	0.90
Total Polled			31,628	100.00
Registered Electors			42,077	
Turnout				75.17

=== 1956 Parliamentary General Election ===
Results of the 3rd parliamentary election held between 5 April 1956 and 10 April 1956:

Candidate	Party	Symbol	Votes	%
C. A. Dharmapala	United National Party	Elephant	13,298	38.58
Percy Wickremasinghe	Ceylon Communist Party	Star	10,591	30.72
P. P. Wickremasuriya	Sri Lanka Freedom Party	Hand	10,250	29.74
Valid Votes			34,139	99.04
Rejected Votes			332	0.96
Total Polled			34,471	
Registered Electors			47,502	
Turnout				72.57

=== 1960 (March) Parliamentary General Election ===
Results of the 4th parliamentary election held on 19 March 1960:

Candidate	Party	Symbol	Votes	%
Don Roy Rajapakse	Mahajana Eksath Peramuna	Cartwheel	9,083	41.80
Victor Ratnayake	United National Party	Elephant	6,884	31.68
P. Somawathie Mathew		Umbrella	2,758	12.69
Sepala Ratnayaka		Cockerel	1,500	6.90
Tudor Wakista	Communist Party of Ceylon	Star	1,318	6.06
Valid Votes			21,543	99.13
Rejected Votes			189	0.87
Total Polled			21,732	100.00
Registered Electors			27,277	
Turnout				79.67

=== 1960 (July) Parliamentary General Election ===
Results of the 5th parliamentary election held on 20 July 1960:

Candidate	Party	Symbol	Votes	%
Don Roy Rajapakse	Sri Lanka Freedom Party	Hand	11,949	55.92
Sirisena Hettige	United National Party	Elephant	9,340	43.71
Valid Votes			21,289	99.63
Rejected Votes			80	0.37
Total Polled			21,369	100.00
Registered Electors			27,277	
Turnout				78.34

=== 1965 Parliamentary General Election ===
Results of the 6th parliamentary election held on 22 March 1965:

Candidate	Party	Symbol	Votes	%
Sirisena Hettige	United National Party	Elephant	15,450	52.35
Don Roy Rajapakse	Sri Lanka Freedom Party	Hand	13,427	45.49
H. S. D. Samarasekera	Mahajana Eksath Peramuna	Cartwheel	232	0.79
M. G. Sriyadasa		Umbrella	179	0.61
Valid Votes			29,288	99.23
Rejected Votes			226	0.76
Total Polled			29,514	100.00
Registered Electors			34,627	
Turnout				85.23

=== 1970 Parliamentary General Election ===
Results of the 7th parliamentary election held on 27 May 1970:

Candidate	Party	Symbol	Votes	%
Don Roy Rajapakse	Sri Lanka Freedom Party	Hand	21,699	63.74
Harshanath Wanigasekera	United National Party	Elephant	12,226	35.91
Valid Votes			33,925	99.66
Rejected Votes			117	0.34
Total Polled			34,042	100.00
Registered Electors			39,604	
Turnout				85.96

=== 1977 Parliamentary General Election ===
Results of the 8th parliamentary election held on 21 July 1977:

Candidate	Party	Symbol	Votes	%
Harshanath Wanigasekera	United National Party	Elephant	22,253	53.22
Ariyaratne Bulegoda	Sri Lanka Freedom Party	Hand	14,747	35.27
Samarasinghe Eugin Alwis	Communist Party of Sri Lanka	Star	2,364	5.65
Ranjit Don Rajapakse	Mahajana Eksath Peramuna	Cartwheel	1,339	3.20
Rubasin Jayasekera Robert		Bell	723	1.73
R. G. A. Andrayas		Chair	233	0.56
Valid Votes			41,659	99.63
Rejected Votes			157	0.37
Total Polled			41,816	100.00
Registered Electors			48,009	
Turnout				87.10
