= Aparekka =

Settlement in Sri Lanka

- Village
- Location of Aparekka in Sri Lanka
- Coordinates: 5°59′33.38″N 80°36′56.29″E
- Country: Sri Lanka
- Province: Southern
- District: Matara District

Area
  - Total: 1.755 km^{2} (0.678 sq mi)
- Elevation: 25 m (82 ft)

Population (2000)
  - Total: 1,036
- Time zone: UTC+5:30 (Sri Lanka Standard Time)
- Post code: 81032

Aparekka is a village in Matara District in Southern Province of Sri Lanka.

The 2011 Sri Lankan census lists the following Grama Niladhari divisions within the Devinuwara Divisional Secretariat:

- Aparekka North (population 690)
- Uda Aparekka East (population 1,303)
- Uda Aparekka (population 1,664)
- Palle Aparekka (population 936)

== History ==
An Attani-type pillar inscription belonging to the 10th century A.D. was discovered near the Sepalikarama Viharaya at Uda Aparekka. It records a grant made to a procession by a king-styled Abasalamevan Mapurmaka. A document belonging to the reign of King Bhuvanaikabahu VI mentions the name Aparekka as a village endowed by the king to a Buddhist monk named Anuruddha Sami. Also, Aparekka is mentioned as Averaca in a letter shared between King Rajasinha II and the Dutch.

Aparekka appears in the 1911 Ceylon Census as Uda (Upper) Aparekka, population of 1,059 in 1901 and 1,194 in 1911 and Palle (Lower) Aparekka, population of 2,109 in 1901 and 2,332 in 1911. The Ceylon Blue Book of 1920 lists separate vernacular schools for boy and girls. In 1935 geologist J.S. Coats discovered hexagonal corundum crystals associated with feldspar and biotite in the area.

== Etymology ==
Although the reliability is low, some believe that the name Aparekka came into usage during the time of King Dutugemunu.

== Transport ==
Aparekka is located on the Meddewatte - Kekanadure - Yatiyana Road (B284). It is immediately to the south of the E01 Aparekka interchange.

== Education ==
The following three schools are listed for Aparekka in the Devinuwara education division in 2020:

- Aparekka Maha Vidyalaya
- Aparekka Model School
- Uda Aparekka Kanishta Vidyalaya, Uda Aparekka

Nearby, Kokawala Central College is listed under Kokawala, Kekanadura. President Sirisena attended its centenary celebrations held on 11 March 2019.
