= Justin Wijayawardhene =

Sri Lankan politician (1904–1982)

Hon. Justin Wijayawardhene MP

Matara
- In office 30 March 1960 – 23 April 1960
- Preceded by: Mahanama Samaraweera
- Succeeded by: Mahanama Samaraweera

Personal details
- Born: Kotavila Vithanage Charles Justin Wijayawardhene; 18 November 1904 Matara, Sri Lanka
- Died: 14 January 1982 (aged 77)
- Other political affiliations: United National Party
- Education: St. Thomas' College, Matara, Mahinda College, Galle
- Occupation: teacher, author, politician
- Ethnicity: Sinhalese

Justin Wijayawardhene (18 November 1904 – 14 January 1982) was a Sri Lankan teacher, author and member of the Parliament of Sri Lanka.

== Early life and education ==
Kotavila Vithanage Charles Justin Wijayawardhene was born in Matara on 18 November 1904 and received his primary school education St. Thomas' College, Matara before attending Mahinda College in Galle.

== Early career ==
He then became a teacher and taught at Rahula College, Matara.

== Political career ==
In collaboration with S. A. Wickramasinghe he established the Matara Sinhalese Youth Association. He became the joint secretary of the Matara Branch of the Ceylon National Congress and was also the Secretary of the Sinhala Maha Sabha.

Wijayawardhena was a founding member of the United National Party and in March 1960 successfully ran in Matara Electoral District at the fourth parliamentary elections gaining just over 36% of the vote. However as the election left neither of the country's two major parties with a majority, another election was called. At the subsequent July election Wijayawardhena was defeated by the SLFP candidate, Mahanama Samaraweera by 2,905 votes.

At the sixth parliamentary elections held in March 1965, Wijayawardhena ran again however this time in the Kamburupitiya Electoral District. He was again unsuccessful, losing by over 4,500 votes to Percy Wickremasinghe.

Wijayawardhena was an author and also translated the works of Leo Tolstoy into Sinhalese. Wijayawardhena died on 14 January 1982 at the age of 77.
