= H. D. Abeygoonewardane =

Sri Lankan politician

Member of the Ceylon Parliament for Matara
- In office 1947–unknown
- Preceded by: constituency created
- Succeeded by: Mahanama Samaraweera

Personal details
- Born: Henry Dias Abeygoonewardane; 29 December 1917
- Party: United National Party

Henry Dias Abeygoonewardane (29 December 1917 – unknown) was a Sri Lankan politician who was a member of the 1st Parliament of Ceylon.

In 1947, standing as the Communist Party of Ceylon's candidate, Abeygoonewardane was elected to the first Parliament of Ceylon, representing the Matara electorate. He received over 57% of the vote whilst his nearest rival obtained only 25%.
