= B. Y. Tudawe =

Sri Lankan politician

Hon. B. Y. Tudawe
- බී. වයි. තුඩාවේ
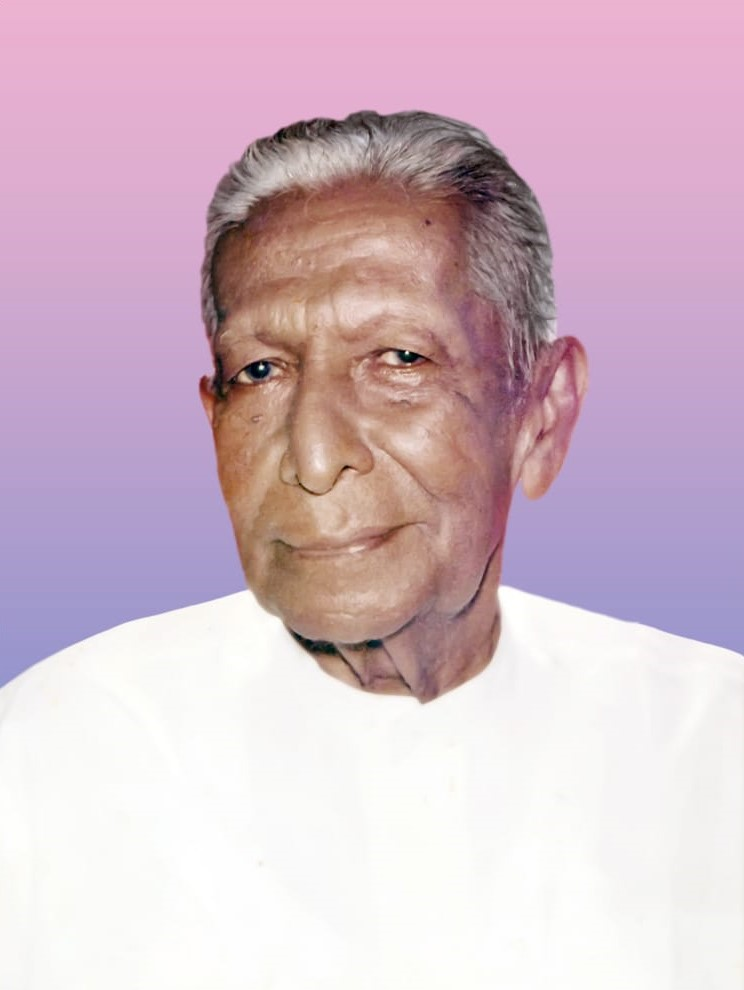

Deputy Minister of Education
- In office 1970–1977
- Prime Minister: Sirimavo Bandaranaike

Member of the Ceylon Parliament for Matara
- In office March 1965 – July 1977
- Preceded by: Mahanama Samaraweera
- Succeeded by: S. K. Piyadasa

Personal details
- Born: 25 September 1915 Matara, Ceylon
- Died: 22 January 2000 (aged 84) Matara, Sri Lanka
- Party: Communist Party of Sri Lanka
- Spouse: Ramyalyn Tudawe
- Children: Ranjini Tudawe
- Education: St. Servatius' College
- Occupation: Teacher

Balaupasakage Yasodis Tudawe (25 September 1915 – 22 January 2000) was a Sri Lankan communist politician. He was a member of the Communist Party of Sri Lanka, serving two terms as a member of parliament and one term as Deputy Minister of Education. He studied at St. Servatius' College, Matara.

== Early life and career ==
Born in 1915 to a poor family in the village of Tudawa in Matara. Having completed his schooling, Tudawe became a teacher at the C.C. School at Gabadaweeadiya, Matara. He studied at St. Servatius' College, Matara. He soon joined the Teachers' Association, Co-operative Society and the Youth Buddhist Society. He later became the District Secretary, Matara of the National Teachers Union of Ceylon.

== Political career ==
He joined the Communist Party of Sri Lanka and rose to the post of District Secretary of the party and was a member of the Central Committee of the party. He was arrested by the police on charges of violating the curfew law during the 1953 Hartal, which had taken place in the country in the wake of the 1953 rice price hike. He was a founding member of the Matara Co-operative Hospitals Society. He represented Ceylon in the International Co-operative Conference in Poland. When the Soviet astronaut Yuri Gagarin arrived in Matara in 1962, Thudawe translated his speech into Sinhala.

As a long-standing member of the Ceylon Communist Party, he was elected to parliament at the 1965 general election in the Matara electorate and was re-elected at the subsequent 1970 general election by a majority of the votes. Tudawe was appointed Deputy Minister of Education in the United Front government led by Prime Minister Sirimavo Bandaranaike. He was defeated in the 1977 general election, in which for the first time the Communist Party was left without parliamentary representation, however he thereafter elected as the opposition leader of the Matara Municipal Council.

In the first Provincial Council election held in 1988, Tudawe was elected to the Southern Provincial Council and held the position of opposition leader and helped the Communist party to work on a correct path. He was elected Minister of the Southern Provincial Council in 1993, but the council was confined only to a few days because it was defeated by a no-confidence motion. Despite losing the re-election, he managed to continue his political career and public service.

== Assassination attempt ==
On 1 October 1987, the JVP which was engaged in their second insurrection, launched a wave of attacks on other left wing parties. On 1 October the Lanka Sama Samaja Party and Ceylon Communist Party offices were attacked and burnt, and B. Y. Tudawe was shot by JVP gunmen whilst he watched television at his home in Matara, the following day the Communist Party offices in Matara were also attacked. Although hospitalised for a long period, he made a complete recovery and returned to politics carrying the JVP assassin's bullets till the day he died.

== Personal life ==
B. Y. Thudawe was married Ramyalyn Tudawe in 1944 and has one child, Ranjini Tudawe.

== Death ==
He died on January 22, 2000, at the age of 84 due to sudden illness.

== See also ==
- List of assassinations of the Second JVP Insurrection
