= Rakwana Electoral District =

Electoral district of Sri Lanka

Rakwana electoral district was an electoral district of Sri Lanka between March 1960 and February 1989. The district was named after the town of Rakwana in Ratnapura District, Sabaragamuwa Province. The 1978 Constitution of Sri Lanka introduced the proportional representation electoral system for electing members of Parliament. The existing 160 mainly single-member electoral districts were replaced with 22 multi-member electoral districts. Rakwana electoral district was replaced by the Ratnapura multi-member electoral district at the 1989 general elections.

== Members of Parliament ==
Key

SLFP UNP

Election	Member	Party	Term
1960 (March)	V. T. G. Karunaratne	Sri Lanka Freedom Party	1960
1960 (July)	V. T. G. Karunaratne	Sri Lanka Freedom Party	1960-1965
1965	H. Kularatne	United National Party	1965-1970
1970	V. T. G. Karunaratne	Sri Lanka Freedom Party	1970-1977
1977	H. Kularatne	United National Party	1977-1989

== Elections ==
=== 1960 (March) Parliamentary General Election ===
Results of the 4th parliamentary election held on 19 March 1960:

Candidate	Party	Symbol	Votes	%
V. T. G. Karunaratne	Sri Lanka Freedom Party	Hand	4,766	31.70
H. Kularatne	United National Party	Elephant	4,542	30.21
T. Wijayanayaka		Key	2,740	18.23
D. D. Wellala		Book	1,201	7.99
C. C. Wickremasinghe		Cartwheel	1,029	6.85
Warnakulage Leelaratne		Lamp	251	1.67
K. G. B. Ariyasinghe		Mortar	194	1.29
Wijaya Tamanegama		Umbrella	184	1.22
Valid Votes			14,907	99.16
Rejected Votes			126	0.84
Total Polled			15,033	100.00
Registered Electors			19,377	
Turnout				77.58

=== 1960 (July) Parliamentary General Election ===
Results of the 5th parliamentary election held on 20 July 1960:

Candidate	Party	Symbol	Votes	%
V. T. G. Karunaratne	Sri Lanka Freedom Party	Hand	8,356	55.55
H. Kularatne	United National Party	Elephant	6,341	42.75
M. W. Weerakkody		Clock	172	1.14
M. Sooriyabandara		Cartwheel	106	0.71
Valid Votes			14,975	99.55
Rejected Votes			68	0.45
Total Polled			15,043	100.00
Registered Electors			19,377	
Turnout				77.63

=== 1965 Parliamentary General Election ===
Results of the 6th parliamentary election held on 22 March 1965:

Candidate	Party	Symbol	Votes	%
H. Kularatne	United National Party	Elephant	10,667	49.23
V. T. G. Karunaratne	Sri Lanka Freedom Party	Hand	10,334	47.69
P. B. Ratnayake		Chair	380	1.39
Don Edwin Malawaraarachchi		Cartwheel	142	0.66
D. R. Malwenne		Sun	60	0.28
Valid Votes			21,583	96.01
Rejected Votes			85	0.39
Total Polled			21,668	100.00
Registered Electors			25,402	
Turnout				85.30

=== 1970 Parliamentary General Election ===
Results of the 7th parliamentary election held on 27 May 1970:

Candidate	Party	Symbol	Votes	%
V. T. G. Karunaratne	Sri Lanka Freedom Party	Hand	14,455	55.98
H. Kularatne	United National Party	Elephant	11,270	43.65
Valid Votes			25,725	99.63
Rejected Votes			95	0.37
Total Polled			25,820	
Registered Electors			28,974	
Turnout				89.11

=== 1977 Parliamentary General Election ===
Results of the 8th parliamentary election held on 21 July 1977:

Candidate	Party	Symbol	Votes	%
H. Kularatne	United National Party	Elephant	21,511	57.03
V. T. G. Karunaratne	Sri Lanka Freedom Party	Hand	14,663	38.87
A. G. B. Amarasingh		Key	1,278	3.39
A. S. Piyasinghe		Lamp	171	0.45
Valid Votes			37,593	99.63
Rejected Votes			127	0.37
Total Polled			37,720	100.00
Registered Electors			41,998	
Turnout				89.81
