= Gandara, Sri Lanka =

Gandara ගන්දර கந்தறை
- Village
- Location within Sri Lanka
- Coordinates: 5°57′N 80°33′E
- Country: Sri Lanka
- Province: Southern

Government
  - Mayor: Upul Nishantha

Area
  - Total: 283 km^{2} (109 sq mi)
  - Land: 270 km^{2} (100 sq mi)
- Elevation: 2 m (6.6 ft)

Population (2010)
  - Total: 12,254
  - Density: 45/km^{2} (120/sq mi)
- Time zone: UTC+5:30 (Sri Lanka Standard Time Zone)
- Postal code: 81170
- Area code: 041

Gandara (Sinhala: ගන්දර, Tamil: கந்தறை) is a village in the Matara District on the southern coast of Sri Lanka, 168 kilometres (104 mi) from Colombo. It is an important village in Matara. It was slightly affected by the Asian tsunami in December 2004.

== History ==
Historically, Gandara belongs to the area called Ruhuna, one of the three kingdoms in Sri Lanka (Thun Sinhalaya). The temple in the village was built by ancient kings and now is a popular sacred place among Buddhists in the area. The mosque in the village was built by villagers in the late 1840s.

== Polling division ==
- Devinuwara

== Education ==
=== Schools ===
- Gandara Maha Vidyalaya
- Gandara kanitu Viduhala
- Al Azhar Muslim Kanista Vidyalaya, established in 1938.

== Places of Worship ==
- Purana Viharaya, Gandara
- Wijerathnaramaya Temple, Gandara
- Abayasekararamaya Temple, Gandara
- Sri Jayabodhi Viharaya, Gandara
- Muhiyaddeen Jumma Mosque

== Transport ==
Gandara is on the Matara – Kataragama main road, which is served by the A32 highway.

== See also ==
- Railway stations in Sri Lanka
