= W. Wickremasinghe =

Sri Lankan politician

Wilson Punnasoma Abeywardena Wickremasinghe (25 December 1899 – ?) was a Sri Lankan politician and member of parliament.

He was the older brother of Dr. S. A. Wickremasinghe, the leader of the Communist Party of Ceylon.

In 1947 he was elected to the first parliament of Ceylon, as an independent, in the Akuressa electorate, before joining the Communist Party of Ceylon. He didn't contest the subsequent 1952 parliamentary elections, allowing his brother's wife, Doreen Young, to run as the Communist Party's candidate.

In 1997 his son, Danyananda, was elected as the United National Party candidate for the Akuressa electorate.
