= Kirinda Puhulwella Divisional Secretariat =

- Divisional Secretariat
- Seal
- Country: Sri Lanka
- Province: Southern Province
- District: Matara District

Government
  - Divisional Secretary: Kusalaka Nanayakkara
- Time zone: UTC+5:30 (Sri Lanka Standard Time)
- Postal code: 81290
- Website: www.kirindapuhulwella.ds.gov.lk

Kirinda Puhulwella Divisional Secretariat is a Divisional Secretariat of Matara District, of Southern Province, Sri Lanka.

Kirinda is multi-racial division, where Sinhalese people and Muslims live together. At some point in the past, Yonaka businessmen came to the district and married Sinhala women and settled there. The division's total population was 22,036 in 2010; 11,146 were female and 10,890 were male. There were 21,268 Sinhalese and 768 Lanka Yonaka people.

== Demography ==
Religion in Kirinda Puhulwella DS Division (2012)
1. Buddhist (96.6%)
2. Hindu (0.00%)
3. Muslim (3.30%)
4. Roman Catholic (0.10%)
5. Other Christian (0.00%)
6. Other (0.00%)
