= Mahanama Samaraweera =

Sri Lankan politician (1917–1966)

Hon. Mahanama Samaraweera

Member of the Ceylon Parliament for Matara
- In office 1952 – March 1960
- Preceded by: H. D. Abeygoonewardane
- Succeeded by: Justin Wijayawardhene
- In office July 1960 – 1965
- Preceded by: Justin Wijayawardhene
- Succeeded by: B. Y. Tudawe

Personal details
- Born: 12 October 1917 Matara, Sri Lanka
- Died: 19 March 1966 (aged 48)
- Party: Communist Party of Ceylon
- Spouse(s): Khema Padmawathi (née Amaraweera)
- Children: Jaimini, Jayanthi Chandani, Mangala Pinsiri
- Education: St. Aloysius' College, Galle, St. Joseph's College, Colombo.
- Profession: Proctor

Mahanama Samaraweera (12 October 1917 – 19 March 1966) was a Sri Lankan politician. He was a Cabinet minister and a member of parliament.

== Early life and education ==
Mahanama Samaraweera was born on 12 October 1917 in Matara, the eldest of two sons of Don Francis Samaraweera, landowner and licensed surveyor, and Lydia Margaret Samaraweera (née Wickremasinghe). Don Francis remarried, after the death of his first wife, to Trincina Helena (née Samarajiva) and they had five children. Samaraweera was educated at St. Aloysius' College, Galle and St. Joseph's College, Colombo. He entered Ceylon Law College in 1939 and qualified as a proctor.

== Political career ==
Samaraweera established his legal practice in Matara, and entered politics. He was elected onto the Urban Council of Matara in 1943.

In 1952, standing as the Communist Party's candidate, Samaraweera was elected to the second parliament of Ceylon, representing the Matara electorate. He changed allegiances to the Mahajana Eksath Peramuna prior to the next election in 1956, where he successfully retained his seat, increasing his margin to almost 60%.

Samaraweera, was appointed as the Parliamentary Secretary to the Minister of Justice and the Parliamentary Secretary to the Minister of Home Affairs in the S. W. R. D. Bandaranaike cabinet. During his tenure in the Ministry of Justice, he introduced the Capital Punishment Act No. 20 in Parliament, which repealed the death sentence and replaced it with life imprisonment.

On 23 July 1960 he was appointed Minister of Local Government and Housing and then on 28 May 1963 the Minister of Communications, as part of the Sirimavo Bandaranaike cabinet.

In 1964 Samaraweera joined the Leader of the House, C. P. de Silva to leave the government with twelve other parliamentarians against the government's introduction of the Press Council Bill, which resulted in the early dissolution of the parliament. Samraweera subsequently joined the Sri Lanka Freedom Socialist Party and contested the 1965 Parliamentary election as a coalition partner of the United National Party. He was however unsuccessful, losing the Matara electorate, by less than 1,000 votes. The Prime Minister, Dudley Senanayake then appointed Samaraweera as the Chairman of the Kantale Sugar Corporation, an important State institution at the time. A position he held until his death in 1966.

The Mahanama Bridge that runs over the Nilawala river and connects two sections of Matara, is named after Samaraweera as it was a project initiated by him (though completed posthumously). The original bridge was updated, widened, and strengthened following the 2004 tsunami through a project initiated by his son Mangala with funding from the Korean government.

== Family ==
He married Khema Padmawathi Amaraweera in 1944. They had three children: Jaimini (an architect); Jayanthi Chandani (travel director and political activist); and Mangala Samaraweera cabinet minister and Member of Parliament for Matara. His wife Khema Padmawathi Samaraweera served as a member of the Matara Urban Council.

== See also ==
- List of political families in Sri Lanka
