= Anil Jasinghe =

Sri Lankan medical administrator

- Born: Anil Jasinghe; Kamburupitiya
- Education: Danylo Halytsky Lviv National Medical University
- Known for: Director General of Health Services Sri Lanka

Dr Anil Jasinghe is a Sri Lankan medical administrator and the current secretary in Ministry of Health and Mass Media, who previously served as the Secretary of the Ministry of Environment of Sri Lanka, as well as the Director-General of Health Services in Ministry of Health, Nutrition and Indigenous Medicine from December 2017 to August 2020, which included the early phase of the COVID-19 Pandemic.

Born in Kamburupitiya, Matara district, Jasinghe was educated at Mahinda College and Ananda College. He graduated from Lvov State Medical Institute, and holds a M.Sc. in Community Medicine and MD in Medical Administration from Postgraduate Institute of Medicine in Sri Lanka. In 2011 he obtained Master of Public Administration (MPA) from Postgraduate Institute of Management of University of Sri Jayewardenepura.
