= S. B. S. Abayakoon =

Sri Lankan academic and civil engineer

Prof.(Eng.)S. B. S. Abayakoon
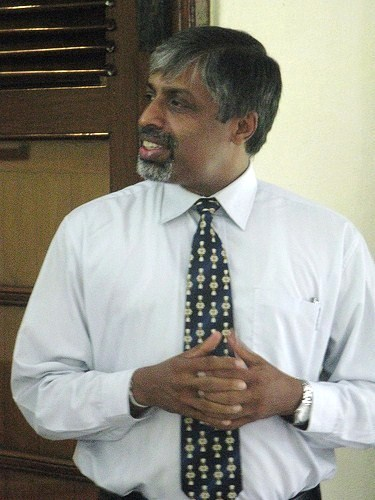

Chairman Engineering Council Sri Lanka(ECSL)
- Incumbent
- Assumed office August 2018

Vice Chancellor University of Peradeniya
- In office August 2009 – 2012
- Preceded by: Harishchandra Abeygunawardena
- Succeeded by: A. Senaratne

Personal details
- Born: 1958 (age 67–68)
- Spouse: Jeevapani Abayakoon
- Children: 4 Girls
- Education: St. Sylvester's College, University of Peradeniya
- Profession: Professor Civil Engineering

Prof. S. B. S. Abayakoon is the current chairman of Engineering council Sri Lanka(ECSL), Governor of the central province and the former Vice-Chancellor of University of Peradeniya, Sri Lanka. Prior to that, he was the Dean of the Faculty of Engineering for four and a half years. He is a Senior professor of Civil Engineering, at Faculty of Engineering, University of Peradeniya. He was appointed the 20th vice-chancellor of the university in August 2009. He completed his primary and secondary education at St/Sylvester's College, Kandy.

== Education ==
Abayakoon was educated at the St. Sylvester's College, Kandy. Then he entered to the University of Peradeniya faculty of engineering for his higher education and completed the bachelor's degree in civil engineering in 1979 with a First Class Honours degree. He received his post graduate degrees, Master of Applied Science and Doctor of Philosophy, from University of British Columbia, Canada in 1983 and in 1987 respectively.

== See also ==
- University of Peradeniya

Academic offices
Preceded by Harishchandra Abeygunawardena	Vice Chancellor University of Peradeniya; 2009–2012	Succeeded by A. Senaratne
