= V. T. G. Karunaratne =

Ceylonese actor and politician

Vela Thanthiri Gurunnanselage Karunaratne (born 23 May 1917) was a Ceylonese actor and politician, member of the Parliament of Sri Lanka and cabinet minister.

Karunaratne was educated at the Government Sinhala School, Rakwana, Maha Bodhi College, Colombo and Government Bilingual school, Matugama.

He was elected to the Parliament of Sri Lanka as first member for Balangoda, representing the Sri Lanka Freedom Party at the 1956 parliamentary election. He contested all the parliamentary elections from 1960 to 1977 from Rakwana, winning the seat in the 1960 March, 1960 July and 1970 elections. He served as Deputy Minister of Posts and Telecommunications in the Second Sirimavo Bandaranaike cabinet.
