= Miella =

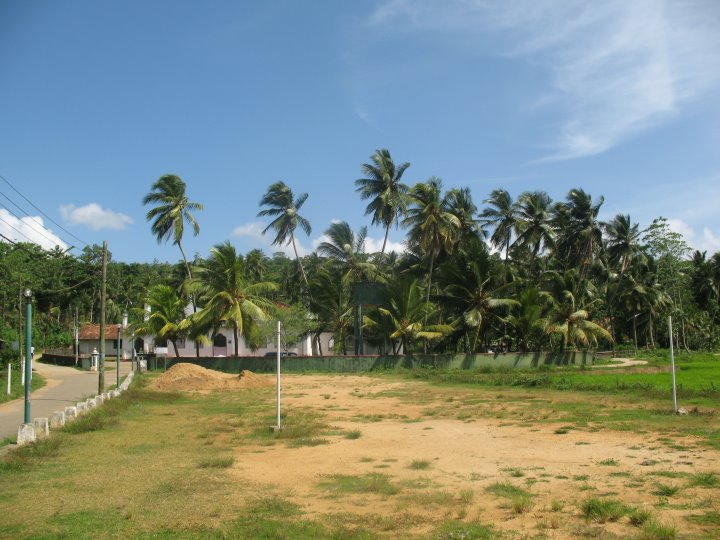
- Miella Mohideen Jumma Masjid

- Location within Sri Lanka
- Coordinates: 6°07′42″N 80°41′25″E
- Country: Sri Lanka
- Province: Southern Province
- Time zone: UTC+5:30 (Sri Lanka Standard Time Zone)
  - Summer (DST): UTC+6 (Summer time)

Miella is a small village in the Matara district of Sri Lanka.
