= Don Edwin Malawaraarachchi =

Sri Lankan politician

Don Edwin Malawaraarachchi (born 27 December 1925) was a Sri Lankan politician.

He first contested 6th parliamentary election, held on 22 March 1965, as an Independent politician in the Rakwana electorate, coming fourth in a field of five candidates, receiving 142 votes.

He then ran in the 8th parliamentary election, held on 21 July 1977, as the United National Party candidate, in the seat of Kamburupitiya. He was successful, receiving 22,306 votes (52.3% of the total vote) defeating the sitting member, Aelian Mahanaga Nanayakkara.

In September 1978 Malawaraarachchi was ordered by the United National Party Disciplinary Committee to resign his seat in Parliament as a result of adverse findings against him by the three member special Committee. He was replaced by Albert Silva on 22 November 1979.
