= Doreen Young Wickremasinghe =

British leftist who became a prominent Communist politician

Hon. Doreen Young Wickremasinghe
- Doreen in Ceylon

Member of the Ceylon Parliament for Akuressa
- In office 1952–1956
- Preceded by: W. Wickremasinghe
- Succeeded by: S. A. Wickramasinghe

Personal details
- Born: 15 February 1907
- Died: 29 May 2000 (aged 93)
- Party: Communist Party of Ceylon
- Spouse: S. A. Wickramasinghe
- Profession: Politician
- Known for: Suriya-Mal Movement

Doreen Wickremasinghe (née Young; 15 February 1907 – 29 May 2000) was a British leftist who became a prominent Communist politician in Sri Lanka and a Member of Parliament (MP). She was one of the handful of European Radicals in Sri Lanka.

== Early life and family ==
Doreen Wickremasinghe was the daughter of two British 'ethical Socialists'. While a student in London in the 1920s, she became involved in the Indian Independence League and carried out other anti-imperialist work. Here she met Dr S. A. Wickramasinghe, a radical Sri Lankan moving in Communist and radical circles while a post-graduate student in London.

Dr Wickremasinghe offered to find her a job in Sri Lanka. She became the principal of a Buddhist girls' school in Matara, Sujatha Vidyalaya (1930–32), where her work on the curriculum included replacing British history with Sri Lankan and world history, and permitting the teachers to get qualified, moving the school away from its emphasis on 'training for wifehood'. During this period she learnt Sinhala. In 1933 she was offered the post of principal at the leading Buddhist girls' school, Visakha Vidyalaya, but the offer was withdrawn on the news that she was to marry Dr Wickremasinghe. After marrying Dr Wickremasinghe, she took up another post as principal of a leading Colombo Buddhist girls school, Ananda Balika Vidyalaya, where her work included promotion of Sri Lankan arts, and teaching Asian poetry. She was removed in 1936 because it was feared she had made the school a centre for anti-British activity - she definitely was responsible for many young women from the Buddhist schools joining the Left.

She and Dr Wickremasinghe had two children, Suren (an architect) and Suriya (Amnesty International IEC chairperson, 1982–85).

== Political career ==
In 1933, she wrote an article called The Battle of the Flowers, which was published in the Ceylon Daily News and detailed what Young thought was the absurdity of forcing Sri Lankan schoolchildren to purchase poppies to help British ex-servicemen at the expense of those from Sri Lanka, which led her to be vilified by her compatriots. This was the beginning of the involvement of the South Colombo Youth League in the revival of Suriya-Mal Movement on a new anti-imperialist and anti-war basis. The movement, which both opposed school pupils' compulsory participation in Poppy Day, and offered yellow Suriya (Portia tree) flowers for sale as an alternative, posing the question, 'whose need is more dire, the ex-servicemen in England or the poor of this country?'

Doreen was elected first president of the Suriya Mal Movement at a meeting held at the residence of Wilmot Perera in Horana. Terence de Zilva and Robin Ratnam were elected Joint Secretaries, and Roy de Mel, Treasurer. Yearly until the Second World War, young men and women sold Suriya flowers on the streets on Armistice Day in competition with the Poppy sellers. The purchasers of the Suriya Mal were generally from the poorer sections of society and the funds collected were not large - part the Proceeds were used to educate a girl from the depressed Rodi caste. But the movement provided a rallying point for the anti-imperialist minded youth of the time. An attempt was made by the British colonial government to curb the movement's effectiveness through the 'Street Collection Regulation Ordinance'.

After many more years of the couple's campaigning, Dr Wickremasinghe was jailed for sedition in 1939.

In 1947, the LSSP and CPC formed the Eksath Kantha Peramuna (United Women's Front) in which Wickremasinghe took a leading role.

In 1952 she was elected to Parliament as Communist Party of Ceylon (CPC) member for the Akuressa seat, defeating C. Wijesinghe of the United National Party. In 1998 the Sri Lankan government conferred on her the title of Deshamanya, the second-highest civil national honour awarded by the Government of Sri Lanka.

== Publications ==
- Doreen Wickremasinghe (ed), Poems of East & West. Colombo: Colombo Apothecaries Co., 1950.
