= Don Roy Rajapakse =

Ceylonese politician

Hon. Don Roy Rajapakse

Member of the Ceylon Parliament for Hakmana
- In office 30 March 1960 – 1965
- Preceded by: C. A. Dharmapala
- Succeeded by: Sirisena Hettige
- In office 1970–1977
- Preceded by: Sirisena Hettige
- Succeeded by: Harshanath Wanigasekera

Personal details
- Born: 26 August 1905
- Party: Sri Lanka Freedom Party
- Other political affiliations: Mahajana Eksath Peramuna
- Education: St. Aloysius' College, Galle; Saint Joseph's College, Colombo

Don Roy Zephrin Rajapakse (born 26 August 1905) was a Ceylonese politician.

Don Roy Zephrin Rajapakse was born 26 August 1905 and received his education at St. Aloysius' College, Galle and Saint Joseph's College, Colombo. After leaving school he became a Sanitary Inspector and worked in that capacity for eight years. In 1941 he was elected to the Beralapanatara Village Committee and in 1957 became Chairman of the Committee, retaining that position until he was defeated at the village committee elections in 1961.

At the 1st parliamentary elections, held in 1947, he ran as an independent for the seat of Deniyaya. He was unsuccessful coming third out of five candidates.

He contested the 4th parliamentary election, held on 19 March 1960, in Hakmana electorate, as the Mahajana Eksath Peramuna nominee. He won the seat defeating the United National Party candidate, Victor Ratnayake, by 2,199 votes. Before the July parliamentary elections he resigned from the Mahajana Eksath Peramuna and joined the Sri Lanka Freedom Party. He ran as that party's nominee and successfully retained his seat, defeating Sirisena Hettige from the United National Party by 2,609 votes. At the 6th parliamentary election, held on 22 March 1965, he lost the seat to Hettige by 2,023 votes.

He ran again at the 7th parliamentary election, held on 27 May 1970, regaining the seat defeating the United National Party candidate, Harshanath Wanigasekera, by 9,473 votes.

At the 1977 parliamentary elections Rajapaske was one of 21 sitting members of parliament who decided not to contest the elections.
