= Malimbada Divisional Secretariat =

Malimbada Divisional Secretariat මාළිම්බඩ ප්‍රාදේශීය ලේකම් කාර්යාලය
- Divisional Secretariat
- Country: Sri Lanka
- Province: Southern Province
- District: Matara District
- Time zone: UTC+5:30 (Sri Lanka Standard Time)
- Website: http://www.malimbada.ds.gov.lk/

Malimbada Divisional Secretariat is a Divisional Secretariat of Matara District, of Southern Province, Sri Lanka.

== Demography ==
Religion in Malimbada DS Division (2012)
1. Buddhist (98.2%)
2. Hindu (0.10%)
3. Muslim (1.40%)
4. Roman Catholic (0.10%)
5. Other Christian (0.20%)
6. Other (0.00%)

== Boundaries ==
North by: Akusessa Divisional Secretariat Division.

South by: Matara And Weligama Divisional Secretariat Division.

East by: River “ Nilwala”

West by: Welipitiya Divisional Secretariat Division.

This division is closely connected with the River Nilwala. It is 10 km away from Matara District and presently converting to a sub town. The main road system from Matara to inner parts of the city is spreading across this division. Today, this division as a migratory zone has become a very crowded area. At present, there are 36,742 people living in the division and most of them are well educated and actively engaging in the development of the country.

There are evidences that this division was crowded from the ancient Anuradhapura Era. There is a historical belief that the people who got rid of thirst by using "maha linda" when going along the Nilwala Basin and entering tono the city across Mathota and the place when this well was situated is referred to as "Mahalindabasa" and later it was changed to "Malimbada" according to Bodiwansaa branch of SriMaha Bodhi was planted in Ganegama Iharya during the Anuradhapura Era. In the past, this area was ruled under the patronage of King and the Divisional Kings stayed in this division. This was proved by the places called “ Rajagewatta”, “ Bisodola”, “Maligathanna”, “ Diwrampitiya”, etc. One of the queens called "Kalyanawathee" who ruled under the Polonnaruwa Era was donated “ Alkiriya Gama” to the temple situated in Weligama now referred to as “Algiriya” in this division.

This area has a moderate climate but receives frequent floods. The main occupation of the people is paddy cultivation.

In addition to that mainly coconut and cinnamon cultivation and additional crops sj\uch as rubber, tea, and pepper. Other cultivation such as Jak, Bread Fruit, Coffee and Aericunut can be seen. As the road from Matara to Akuressa Deniyaya is going across this division, this area has become a centre for economic and commercial purposes. The junction of Malimbada and Telijjawila is gradually turning into a commercial center.

The area is growing quickly with the highway and projects of “Gama Neguma” and “Maga Neguma”. Businessmen are also spreading into the city. As a result of the growth, the area is becoming congested.
