= Bikram Singh =

Bikram Singh may refer to:

- Bikram Singh, Raja of Saraikela; see List of state leaders in 1620
- Bikram Singh (cyclist), Indian track cyclist
- Bikram Singh (general, born 1911) (1911–1963), Indian Army general who was killed in the 1963 Poonch Indian Air Force helicopter crash
- K. Bikram Singh (1938–2013), Indian filmmaker and politician
- Bikram Singh (general, born 1952), former Chief of Army Staff of Indian Army
- Bikram Singh (politician), cabinet minister from Himachal Pradesh
- Bikram Singh (musician) (born c. 1980), American bhangra music artist

== See also ==
- Mohan Bikram Singh (born 1935), Nepalese politician
- Bikram Singh Majithia (born 1975), Punjabi Indian politician
- Bikram Singha: The Lion Is Back, a 2012 Indian film by Rajiv Kumar Biswas
- Vikram Singh (disambiguation)
- Bikram (disambiguation)
- Singh, Indian surname
