= Akuressa Divisional Secretariat =

Coordinates: 6.1375°N 80.4436°E

- Divisional Secretariat
- Interactive map of Akuressa Divisional Secretariat
- Country: Sri Lanka
- Province: Southern Province
- District: Matara District
- Time zone: UTC+5:30 (Sri Lanka Standard Time)

Akuressa Divisional Secretariat is a Divisional Secretariat of Matara District, of Southern Province, Sri Lanka.

== Demography ==
Religion in Akuressa DS Division (2012)
1. Buddhist (97.4%)
2. Hindu (2.00%)
3. Muslim (0.00%)
4. Roman Catholic (0.20%)
5. Other Christian (0.30%)
6. Other (0.00%)
