= Albert Silva =

Sri Lankan politician

Hon. Albert Silva

Member of Parliament for Galle
- In office 1977–1979
- Preceded by: Wijeyananda Dahanayake
- Succeeded by: Wijeyananda Dahanayake

Member of Parliament for Kamburupitiya
- In office 1979–1983
- Preceded by: Don Edwin Malawaraarachchi
- Succeeded by: Chandrakumara Wijeya Gunawardena

Personal details
- Born: Dangedera Gamage Albert de Silva; 16 June 1917 Galle, British Ceylon
- Died: 11 April 2009 (aged 91) Karapitiya, Sri Lanka
- Party: United National Party
- Spouse: Ratna Kottegoda
- Children: Chandani, Harshani, Viraj
- Education: Mahinda College, Galle
- Occupation: Politician

D. G. Albert de Silva (16 June 1917 – 11 April 2009), commonly known as Albert Silva, was a Sri Lankan politician. Elected to the parliament from Galle electorate in 1977, Albert de Silva was a legislator in the J. R. Jayawardene government.

Dangedera Gamage Albert de Silva was born on 16 June 1917, and was educated at Mahinda College in Galle. Albert de Silva defeated the former Prime Minister Dr. Wijayananda Dahanayake at the 1977 general election, contesting for the Galle seat. He made a great effort to develop Galle, until he was unseated on an election petition filed by Wijayananda Dahanayake. A by-election was held on 20 December 1979, where Dahanayake won as a United National Party candidate for Galle. Later the government appointed Albert Silva as the member of the parliament for Kamburupitiya electorate in Matara District. He served as the MP for Kamburupitiya until his resignation on 10 February 1983.

The first proper bus stand in Galle was erected in 1978 on the instructions and efforts of Albert Silva, then the Member of the parliament for Galle. The Galle Police station, Post Office and the main Bus Terminus were built when he was the MP in the area. He rendered yeoman service to uplift electricity, health and education facilities among the people of Galle. As a politician, he also played a pioneer role in religious and social activities in the area and spent his personal wealth for the well-being of the poor people. He was married to Ratna Kottegoda, and had two daughters Chandani, Harshani and a son Viraj. Albert de Silva died on 11 April 2009, at the Karapitiya Teaching Hospital after a brief illness, and was 91 at the time of his death.
