= Kapila Gunasekara =

Sri Lankan academic

- Born: Galle District, Sri Lanka
- Education: Mahinda College; University of Peradeniya
- Occupation: Academic

Professor Kapila G. A. Gunasekara is a Sri Lankan academic. He was the first Vice Chancellor of the University of Vocational Technology (UNIVOTEC), Sri Lanka. A professor of Agriculture, he was the Vice Chancellor of the University of Peradeniya from 2000 to 2006. Before serving as the vice chancellor of the Peradeniya University, he also served as the Dean of the Faculty of Agriculture.

He was born in Galle District and received his school education at Mahinda College, Galle.

Academic offices
Preceded by -	Vice Chancellor University of Vocational Technology	Succeeded by T. A. Piyasiri
Preceded by R. A. L. H. Gunawardana	Vice Chancellor University of Peradeniya; 2000–2006	Succeeded by Harishchandra Abeygunawardena
