= Hakmana Divisional Secretariat =

Coordinates: 6.0839°N 80.6432°E

- Divisional Secretariat
- Interactive map of Hakmana Divisional Secretariat
- Country: Sri Lanka
- Province: Southern Province
- District: Matara District
- Time zone: UTC+5:30 (Sri Lanka Standard Time)

Hakmana Divisional Secretariat is a Divisional Secretariat of Matara District, of Southern Province, Sri Lanka.

== Demography ==
Religion in Hakmana DS Division (2012)
1. Buddhist (96.8%)
2. Hindu (0.00%)
3. Muslim (3.00%)
4. Roman Catholic (0.10%)
5. Other Christian (0.10%)
6. Other (0.00%)
