= Dickwella Divisional Secretariat =

Dikwella Divisional Secretariat
- Divisional Secretariat
- Country: Sri Lanka
- Province: Southern Province
- District: Matara District

Area
  - Total: 51.9 km^{2} (20.0 sq mi)

Population (2012)
  - Total: 54,187
  - Density: 1,055/km^{2} (2,730/sq mi)
- Time zone: UTC+5:30 (Sri Lanka Standard Time)
- Website: http://www.dickwella.ds.gov.lk/

Dickwella Divisional Secretariat is a Divisional Secretariat of Matara District, of Southern Province, Sri Lanka.

== Demography ==
Religion in Dickwella DS Division (2012)
1. Buddhist (94.6%)
2. Hindu (0.10%)
3. Muslim (5.10%)
4. Roman Catholic (0.10%)
5. Other Christian (0.10%)
6. Other (0.00%)
