= Mulatiyana Divisional Secretariat =

- Divisional Secretariat
- Location within Sri Lanka
- Country: Sri Lanka
- Province: Southern Province
- District: Matara District
- Time zone: UTC+5:30 (Sri Lanka Standard Time)

Mulatiyana Divisional Secretariat is a Divisional Secretariat of Matara District, of Southern Province, Sri Lanka.

== Demography ==
Religion in Mulatiyana DS Division (2012)
1. Buddhist (99.5%)
2. Hindu (0.50%)
3. Muslim (0.00%)
4. Roman Catholic (0.00%)
5. Other Christian (0.00%)
6. Other (0.00%)
