= Dileepa Wickramasinghe =

Sri Lankan cricketer and administrator

Dileepa Wickramasinghe (born 16 November 1965) is a British-born Sri Lankan former cricketer and cricket administrator. He was a top-order batsman who represented Sri Lanka, Sri Lanka A and Tamil Union Cricket and Athletic Club in First class and List A cricket. After retirement from cricket, he served as the manager of the Sri Lanka A cricket team and one of the selectors of the Sri Lanka national cricket team. Born in Hackney, London, he was educated at Mahinda College, Galle, where he started his cricket career. He captained the college cricket team in 1984 and represented the Sri Lanka Under-19 cricket team the same year. His younger brother Duminda Wickramasinghe was also a first class cricketer in Sri Lanka.
