= Philip Nehri Mullegama =

Sri Lankan former drug addict and business consultant

- Education: St. Joseph's College, Colombo
- Occupations: entrepreneur, corporate trainer, personality development coach, motivational speaker, business consultant

Philip Nehri Mullegama is a Sri Lankan entrepreneur, corporate trainer, personality development coach, motivational speaker, business consultant and a former drug addict. He currently works as the CEO of Chandanaleepa which is one of the largest local Ayurvedic cosmetics manufacturers in Sri Lanka. He is considered as a role model by many in the Sri Lankan community due to his unique transition from being a rejected mental patient, drug addict to top corporate professional mentor and corporate trainer.

== Biography ==
He spent his childhood confronting poverty and his mother left him and his father when he was around three years old. He attended the Saint Joseph's College, Colombo for his primary and secondary education. He became a drug addict at the age of 17 mainly due to associating with friends who had been under the influence of heroin for a long time. He was admitted to the Angoda National Mental Hospital after being diagnosed as a mentally ill person. He endured difficulties as a youngster due to his abysmal drug addiction records and was even rejected by many rehabilitation centres. During his youth days, he also went onto beg in the streets of Dehiwala and Nugegoda in a desperate attempt to survive after being rejected in the society.

He was labelled in the society as an obnoxious person and he was also reported to have approached a prostitute for love and to be in a romantic relationship with her. He later began to focus on obtaining professional qualifications and to build up his career at the age of 30 after wasting majority of his life during his twenties.

== Career ==
He was adjudged as the best Sri Lankan student award from the CIM - UK in its final stage. He was also honored with a prestigious Doctorate title by the United Nations, University for Global Peace in USA recognising his immense transformation in personal life from being a drug addict to a professional corporate trainer. He is also the youngest ever Sri Lankan to be awarded a full time scholarship from the Government of the USA in Therapeutic Community Psychological Counselling. He became a counsellor after being certified by the United States.

He also formerly served as a head of marketing for the South Asian region of Nature's Secrets, a cosmetics brand which was a pioneer in the local industry. He also works as a senior lecturer at the Sri Lanka Institute of Marketing. He also works as a columnist for The Sunday Times often providing insights about personality development. He also delivers transformational lecturers regarding personality development.
