= Deshabhimani (Sri Lanka) =

Sri Lankan weekly newspaper

Deshabhimani ('Patriot') was a Tamil-language weekly newspaper published from Colombo, an organ of the Communist Party of Sri Lanka. Deshabhimani emerged in the 1950s. During its initial years, it had a circulation of around 10,000. As of the late 1950s and early 1960s, H.M.P. Mohiden was the editor-in-chief of the publication (he was expelled in the Sino-Soviet split in 1963). As of the early 1970s, P. Ramanathan was the editor of the newspaper.
