= Pitabeddara Divisional Secretariat =

- Divisional Secretariat
- Interactive map of Pitabeddara Divisional Secretariat
- Country: Sri Lanka
- Province: Southern Province
- District: Matara District
- Time zone: UTC+5:30 (Sri Lanka Standard Time)

Pitabeddara Divisional Secretariat is a Divisional Secretariat of Matara District, of Southern Province, Sri Lanka.

The current Divisional Secretary is Mrs. S.K.G. Prasangika and Mr. Lahiru Sandaruwan Madushanka Gamage is the Assistant Divisional Secretary.

== Demography ==
Religion in Pitabeddara DS Division (2012)
1. Buddhist (93.0%)
2. Hindu (6.00%)
3. Muslim (0.10%)
4. Roman Catholic (0.20%)
5. Other Christian (0.80%)
6. Other (0.00%)
