= Thihagoda Divisional Secretariat =

- Divisional Secretariat
- Motto: තිරසාර සංවර්ධනයක් උදෙසා ඵලදායි රාජ්‍ය සේවයක් ඉටු කිරීම; To perform effective public service for sustainable development
- Location within Sri Lanka
- Coordinates: 6°0′59.7206″N 80°34′7.9094″W
- Country: Sri Lanka
- Province: Southern Province
- District: Matara District

Government
  - Type: Government Office
- Time zone: UTC+5:30 (Sri Lanka Standard Time)
- Postal code: 81280
- Website: Divisional Secretariat - Thihagoda

Thihagoda Divisional Secretariat is a Divisional Secretariat of Matara District, of Southern Province, Sri Lanka.

== Demography ==
Religion in Thihagoda DS Division (2012)
1. Buddhist (99.7%)
2. Hindu (0.10%)
3. Muslim (0.00%)
4. Roman Catholic (0.10%)
5. Other Christian (0.10%)
6. Other (0.00%)
