= Harishchandra Abeygunawardena =

Sri Lankan vice-chancellor

14th Vice Chancellor University of Peradeniya
- In office 1 August 2006 – July 2009
- Preceded by: Kapila Gunasekara
- Succeeded by: S. B. S. Abayakoon

Personal details
- Born: Mandaduwa
- Education: Mandaduwa Primary School; Mahinda College; University of Peradeniya; University of Illinois

Harishchandra Abeygunawardena is a former Vice-Chancellor of University of Peradeniya, in Sri Lanka.

Abeygunawardena holds a BVSc from the University of Peradeniya, together with an MSc and PhD from the University of Illinois. Since 1977 he has served on the academic staff of the Faculty of Veterinary Medicine and Animal Science at the University of Peradeniya and since May 2000 was the Dean of Veterinary Medicine and Animal Science. He served as the 14th Vice Chancellor of the University of Peradeniya from 1 August 2006 until July 2009. Following which he served as a member of the University Grants Commission.

Academic offices
Preceded by Kapila Gunasekara	Vice Chancellor University of Peradeniya; 2006–2009	Succeeded by S. B. S. Abayakoon
