= Athuraliya Divisional Secretariat =

- Divisional Secretariat
- Location within Sri Lanka
- Country: Sri Lanka
- Province: Southern Province
- District: Matara District
- Time zone: UTC+5:30 (Sri Lanka Standard Time)

Athuraliya Divisional Secretariat is a Divisional Secretariat of Matara District, of Southern Province, Sri Lanka.

== Demography ==
Religion in Athuraliya DS Division (2012)
1. Buddhist (92.4%)
2. Hindu (1.60%)
3. Muslim (5.40%)
4. Roman Catholic (0.20%)
5. Other Christian (0.50%)
6. Other (0.00%)
