= Welipitiya Divisional Secretariat =

- Divisional Secretariat
- Country: Sri Lanka
- Province: Southern Province
- District: Matara District
- Time zone: UTC+5:30 (Sri Lanka Standard Time)

Welipitiya Divisional Secretariat is a Divisional Secretariat of Matara District, of Southern Province, Sri Lanka.

== Demography ==
Religion in Welipitiya DS Division (2012)
1. Buddhist (87.4%)
2. Hindu (0.10%)
3. Muslim (12.2%)
4. Roman Catholic (0.10%)
5. Other Christian (0.20%)
6. Other (0.00%)
