= Neville Cooray =

Sri Lankan surgeon and academic

- Born: 1927
- Died: 13 June 2020 (aged 92–93)
- Education: St. Joseph's College, University of Ceylon
- Occupations: Doctor, academic
- Spouse: Noeline Rohini Samarasekera Gunaratne
- Children: 2
- Scientific career
- Fields: Surgery, Radiology

Nawalage Charles Neville Cooray (1927 - June 13, 2020) was a Sri Lankan surgeon, doctor in the field of radiotherapy. Throughout his career, he held various positions internationally, particularly focusing on advancements in cancer treatment.

During his tenure, Cooray served as a Senior Lecturer at the University of Colombo while simultaneously practicing at the Cancer Hospital in Maharagama.Throughout his career, Cooray actively contributed to professional associations such as the American Society of Therapeutic Radiologists, the Canadian Association of Radiologists, and the Faculty of Radiologists, London. Additionally, he played a significant role as Vice President of the Sri Lanka Cancer Society.

== Early life and education ==
Cooray was born in 1927 in Ragama, Sri Lanka. He attended St. Joseph's College, Colombo, for his early education. He later pursued higher education at the University of Ceylon in 1948, obtaining a Bachelor of Science degree with a major in biology. Subsequently, he entered the university's Medical Faculty, graduating with a bachelor's degree in Medicine & Surgery in 1953.

== Career ==
Following his medical education, Cooray began his professional career at the General Hospital, Colombo, serving as a Resident in both Medicine & Surgery. He later specialised in Radiology and underwent further training in the United Kingdom on a Commonwealth Scholarship, honing his skills at institutions such as the Hammersmith Hospital in London and the Holt Institute in Manchester.

Returning to Sri Lanka, Cooray assumed roles as a Senior Lecturer at the University of Colombo while practising at the Cancer Hospital in Maharagama. He later pursued international assignments, including positions in Newfoundland, Canada, and Syracuse, New York. In 1976, he relocated to Pittsburgh, Pennsylvania, where he served as the Director of the Montefiore Hospital and held an assistant professorship in radiology at the University of Pittsburgh.

== Personal life ==
In 1954, Cooray married Noeline Rohini Samarasekera Gunaratne. The couple had two sons, Anil and Rohan.

== Legacy ==
Cooray was a member of professional associations such as the American Society of Therapeutic Radiologists, the Canadian Association of Radiologists, and the Faculty of Radiologists, London. Additionally, he served as Vice President of the Sri Lanka Cancer Society.

== Death ==
Cooray died on June 13, 2020, during the COVID-19 lockdown. He was laid to rest in a private funeral ceremony.
