= Forward (Sri Lanka) =

English-language weekly newspaper

Forward was an English-language weekly newspaper published from Colombo, an organ of the Communist Party of Sri Lanka. Forward was one of few political party-affiliated publications printed in English in Sri Lanka at the time.
