= Matara Divisional Secretariat =

- Divisional Secretariat
- Country: Sri Lanka
- Province: Southern Province
- District: Matara District

Government
  - Divisional Secretary: Ranjith Yapa

Area
  - Total: 53.9 km^{2} (20.8 sq mi)

Population (2011)
  - Total: 114,298
  - Density: 2,144/km^{2} (5,550/sq mi)
- Time zone: UTC+5:30 (Sri Lanka Standard Time)
- Website: http://www.matara.ds.gov.lk/

Matara Divisional Secretariat is a Divisional Secretariat of Matara District, of Southern Province, Sri Lanka.

== Demography ==
Religion in Matara DS Division (2012)
1. Buddhist (95.3%)
2. Hindu (0.20%)
3. Muslim (3.80%)
4. Roman Catholic (0.40%)
5. Other Christian (0.30%)
6. Other (0.00%)
