= Kamburupitiya =

- Location within Sri Lanka
- Coordinates: 6°05′N 80°34′E
- Country: Sri Lanka
- Province: Southern Province
- District: Matara District

Area
  - Total: 2 km^{2} (0.77 sq mi)
- Elevation: 14.06 m (46.1 ft)

Population (2015)
  - Total: 2,380
- Time zone: UTC+5:30 (Sri Lanka Standard Time Zone)
  - Summer (DST): UTC+6 (Summer time)

Kamburupitiya is a town in the Matara District, Southern Province, Sri Lanka.

It is located 19 km (12 mi) north of Matara at the intersection of the B356 (Kamburupitiya-Kirinda Road) and the B415 (Thihagoda-Kotapola Road).

The town is situated in a wet, hilly zone, where cinnamon, and tea with high tannin levels, are grown. Traditional employment is growing rubber and working in the rice paddy fields in the low-lying lands.

== See also ==
- Kamburupitiya Divisional Secretariat
