= Kotapola Divisional Secretariat =

- Divisional Secretariat
- Interactive map of Kotapola Divisional Secretariat
- Country: Sri Lanka
- Province: Southern Province
- District: Matara District
- Time zone: UTC+5:30 (Sri Lanka Standard Time)

Kotapola Divisional Secretariat is a Divisional Secretariat of Matara District, of Southern Province, Sri Lanka.

== Demography ==
Religion in Kotapola DS Division (2012)
1. Buddhist (80.9%)
2. Hindu (14.9%)
3. Muslim (0.30%)
4. Roman Catholic (1.70%)
5. Other Christian (2.10%)
6. Other (0.00%)
