= Pasgoda Divisional Secretariat =

- Divisional Secretariat
- Interactive map of Pasgoda Divisional Secretariat
- Country: Sri Lanka
- Province: Southern Province
- District: Matara District
- Time zone: UTC+5:30 (Sri Lanka Standard Time)

Pasgoda Divisional Secretariat is a Divisional Secretariat of Matara District, of Southern Province, Sri Lanka.

== Demography ==
Religion in Pasgoda DS Division (2012)
1. Buddhist (97.1%)
2. Hindu (2.30%)
3. Muslim (0.00%)
4. Roman Catholic (0.20%)
5. Other Christian (0.40%)
6. Other (0.00%)
