= Sirisena Hettige =

Ceylonese politician

Sirisena Hettige (born 15 July 1920) was a Ceylonese politician. A member of the United National Party, he was a parliamentarian for Hakmana electorate in Matara district. Hettige was born in Matara and educated at Mahinda College, Galle, where he was an outstanding cricketer during his school days. He was a planter by profession and was a director of the Sri Lanka State Plantation Corporation.
