= Douglas Dias Jayasinha =

Ceylonese cricketer and cricket administrator

Douglas Dias-Jayasinha (11 May 1915 – 29 April 2006) was a Ceylonese cricketer and cricket administrator. Born in Galle, he was educated at Mahinda College, where he captained his college cricket team from 1934 to 1936. A left-hand batsman, a handy bowler and slip fielder, he was one of the first from the south of the island to represent All-Ceylon, against New Zealand in 1937 and India in 1945. He was a national selector from 1961 to 1973, the last ten years as chairman. He died on 29 April 2006, aged 90.
