= Suriya-Mal Movement =

Benefit for Sri Lankan veterans

The Suriya-Mal Movement was formed in the British colony of Ceylon to sell Suriya flowers on Poppy Day for the benefit of Sri Lankan ex-servicemen. The movement became anti-imperialist in character, and was also involved in relief work during the Malaria epidemic of 1934–1935.

== Beginnings ==
In protest against the proceeds of poppy sales on Armistice Day (11 November) being used to support British ex-servicemen instead of Sri Lankans, a Sri Lankan named Aelian Perera started to sell Suriya flowers on the same day, the proceeds of which were devoted to help Sri Lankan veterans.

In 1933, a British schoolteacher, Doreen Young wrote an article called The Battle of the Flowers, which was published in the Ceylon Daily News and detailed what Young thought was the absurdity of forcing Sri Lankan schoolchildren to purchase poppies to help British ex-servicemen at the expense of those from Sri Lanka, which led her to be vilified by her compatriots.

The South Colombo Youth League then became involved in the Suriya Mal Movement and revived it on a new anti-imperialist and anti-war basis. Annually, until the Second World War, young men and women sold Suriya flowers on the streets on Armistice Day in competition with the poppy sellers. The purchasers of the Suriya Mal were generally from the poorer sections of society and the funds collected were not large. But the movement provided a rallying point for the anti-imperialist minded youth of the time. An attempt was made by the British colonial government to curb the movement's effectiveness, by means of legislation, in the form the 'Street Collection Regulation Ordinance'.

Doreen Young was elected as first President of the Suriya Mal Movement at a meeting held at the residence of Wilmot Perera in Horana. Terence de Zilva and Robin Ratnam were elected Joint Secretaries, and Roy de Mel was elected as Treasurer.

== Malaria Epidemic and floods ==
There had been a drought in 1934 which caused a shortage of rice, estimated at 3 million bushels. From October onwards there were floods, followed by a malaria epidemic in 1934–35, during which 1,000,000 people were affected and at least 125,000 died. The Suriya-Mal Movement was honed by volunteer work among the poor during the Malaria Epidemic and the floods. The volunteers found that there was widespread malnutrition, which was aggravated by the shortage of rice, and which reduced resistance to the disease. They helped fight the malnutrition by making pills of Marmite yeast extract. N.M. Perera became known as Parippu Mahathmaya ('Mr. Dhal') because of the lentils he distributed as dry rations to the people affected in those days.

== See also ==
- Sri Lankan independence movement
- Lanka Sama Samaja Party
