= Kamburupitiya Divisional Secretariat =

- Divisional Secretariat
- Country: Sri Lanka
- Province: Southern Province
- District: Matara District
- Time zone: UTC+5:30 (Sri Lanka Standard Time)

Kamburupitiya Divisional Secretariat is a Divisional Secretariat of Matara District, of Southern Province, Sri Lanka.

== Demography ==
Religion in Kamburupitiya DS Division (2012)
1. Buddhist (99.7%)
2. Hindu (0.10%)
3. Muslim (0.00%)
4. Roman Catholic (0.10%)
5. Other Christian (0.10%)
6. Other (0.00%)
