= Akuressa =

- Town
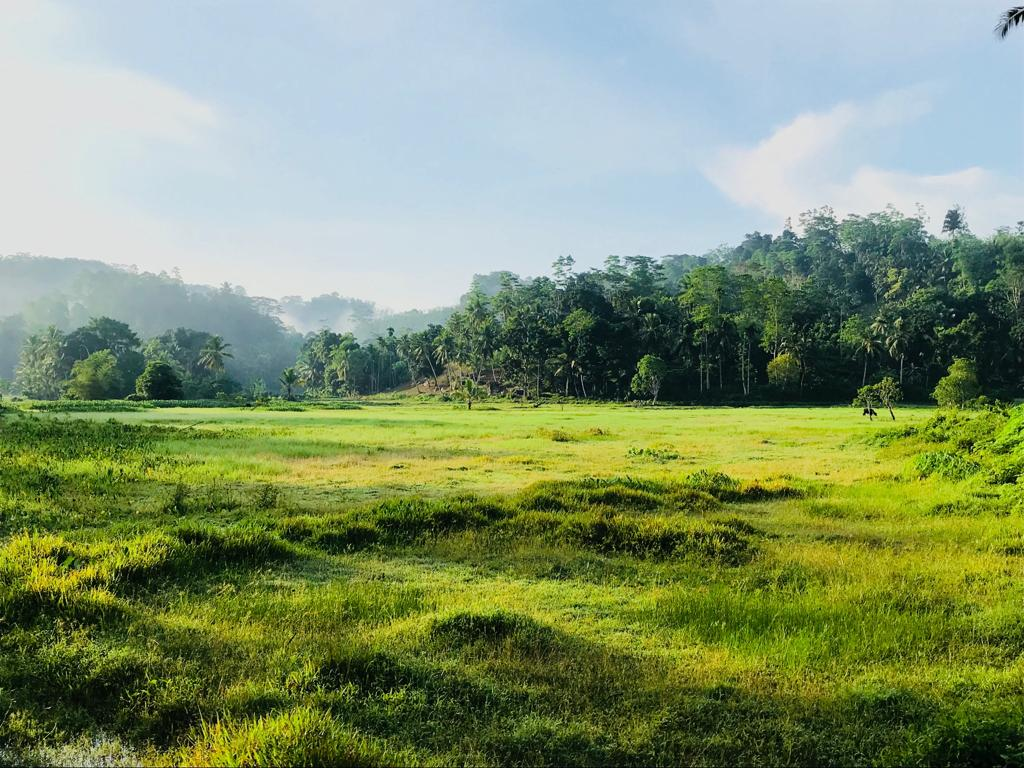
- Green paddy field in Akuressa near Galle

- Location in Sri Lanka
- Coordinates: 6°6′00″N 80°28′40″E
- Country: Sri Lanka
- Province: Southern Province
- District: Matara District
- Time zone: UTC+5:30 (Sri Lanka Standard Time)

Akuressa (Sinhalese: අකුරැස්ස) is located in Matara District of the Southern Province. It is located on the Matara–Deniyaya road, approximately 23.6 km (14.7 mi) from Matara and 39.7 km (24.7 mi) from Galle.

The surrounding areas produce tea, coconut, rubber and agricultural products such as rice. Akuressa is surrounded by small towns such as Imaduwa, Pitabaddara, Algiriya, Kamburupitiya, Makandura. Many state institutions are situated in the town such as the district hospital, a police station and schools.

There are many GS Divisions. Such as Paraduwa, Mawawwa, Kiyaduwa, Galabadahena, Poraba, Iluppalla, Ibulgoda, Maraba, Hulandawa, Peddapitiya, Lenama, Idikatudeniya, Udupitiya Diyalape, Higgoda, Eramudugoda, Katanvila, Maliduwa, Walikatiya, Kananke.

== See also ==
- List of towns in Southern Province, Sri Lanka
