= Hakmana, Matara =

Hakmana හක්මණ
- Location within Sri Lanka
- Coordinates: 6.0796°N 80.6577°E
- Country: Sri Lanka
- Province: Southern Province

Population (2012)
  - Total: 28,941
- Time zone: UTC+5:30 (Sri Lanka Standard Time Zone)

Hakmana (හක්මණ) is a town in the Matara District, Southern Province of Sri Lanka.

Postal Code Hakmana : 81300

== See also ==
- List of towns in Southern Province, Sri Lanka
