= Devinuwara Divisional Secretariat =

- Divisional Secretariat
- Country: Sri Lanka
- Province: Southern Province
- District: Matara District
- Time zone: UTC+5:30 (Sri Lanka Standard Time)

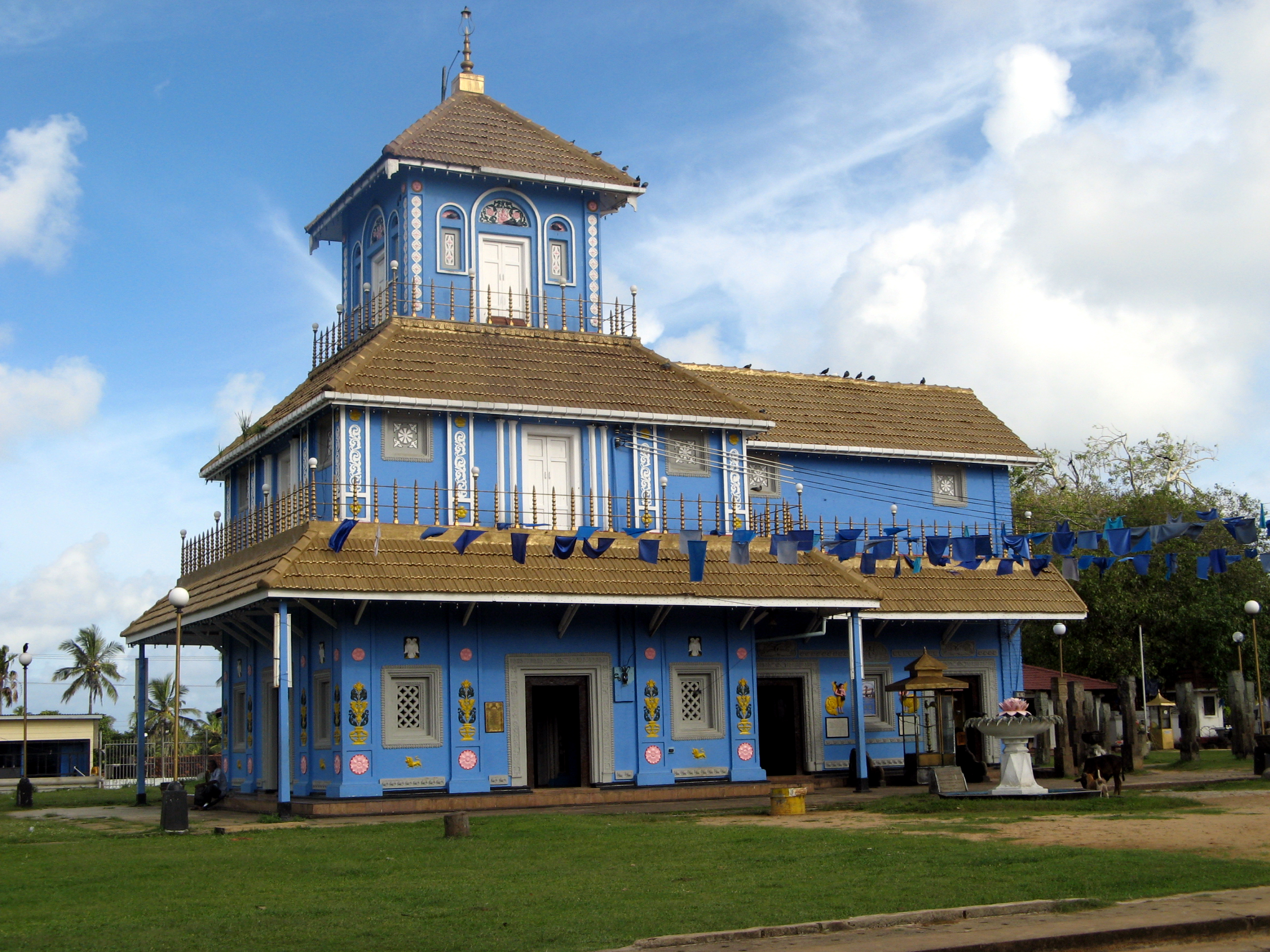
Dondra

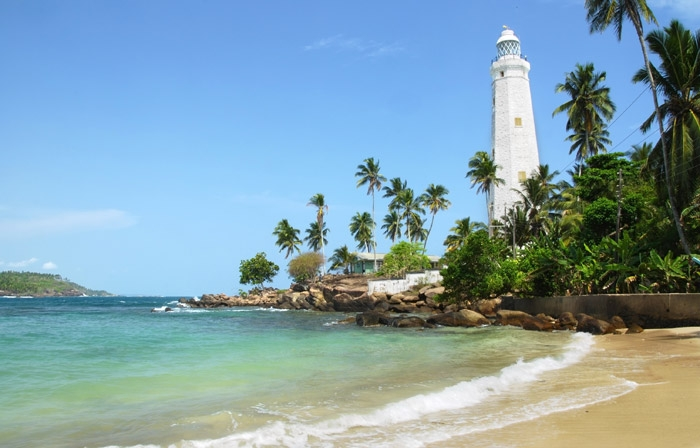
lighthouse

Devinuwara Divisional Secretariat is a Divisional Secretariat of Matara District, of Southern Province, Sri Lanka.

== Demography ==
Religion in Devinuwara DS Division (2012)
1. Buddhist (98.1%)
2. Hindu (0.10%)
3. Muslim (1.40%)
4. Roman Catholic (0.20%)
5. Other Christian (0.20%)
6. Other (0.00%)
