= S. A. Wickramasinghe =

Sri Lankan doctor (1900-1981)

Hon. S. A. Wickremasinghe

Member of the Ceylon Parliament for Akuressa
- In office 1956–1977
- Preceded by: Doreen Young Wickremasinghe
- Succeeded by: Dayananda Wickremasinghe

Member of the State Council of Ceylon for Morawka
- In office 1931–1935
- Succeeded by: R. C. Kannangara
- In office 1946–1947
- Preceded by: R. C. Kannangara

Personal details
- Born: 13 May 1900 Athuraliya, Matara District, British Ceylon
- Died: 25 August 1981 (aged 81) Colombo, Sri Lanka
- Party: Communist Party of Sri Lanka
- Spouse: Doreen Young Wickremasinghe
- Education: Mahinda College Galle; Ananda College Colombo; Ceylon Medical College
- Profession: Politician and medical doctor

Sugiswara Abeywardena Wickremasinghe (13 April 1900 – 25 August 1981) was the founder of the Communist Party of Sri Lanka. He was the first Leftist to be elected to Ceylon State Council in 1931. He is considered one of the leading political figures of Sri Lanka in the twentieth century.

== Early life and education ==
S. A. Wickramasinghe was born in Nasnaranketiya Walawwa, Athuraliya in the Matara district of then British Ceylon in 1900. He received his primary education at Mahinda College, Galle, where he engaged in social services and Buddhist activities. He later entered Ananda College, Colombo.

Wickramasinghe pursued his higher studies in medicine at the Ceylon Medical College, and proceeded to the United Kingdom for his post-graduate studies.

In England, he participated on activism with the League Against Imperialism and the British Communist Party. During this time he met fellow Ceylonese progressives and the future leaders of the Left movement such as N. M. Perera, Colvin R. de Silva and Leslie Goonewardene, who were also studying in London and fellow-students of Marxism.

== Early activism ==
On his way back to Ceylon, S. A. Wickramasinghe travelled to India to meet members of the Indian National Congress as well as the Communist Party of India. He was immediately arrested by British police in Bombay but managed to make contact with figures such as Jawaharlal Nehru and Rabindranath Tagore.

After returning to Sri Lanka, he co-founded the Lanka Sama Samaja Party and also served as the General Manager of Buddhist Theosophical Society schools in Sri Lanka. A medical practitioner by profession, he started working as a doctor after his post-graduate studies and joined the Government Service and started practising in his native Matara district.

Wickramasinghe played a leading role in the Suriya Mal Movement. He also organised relief for peasants during the Malaria epidemic and floods that plagued Sri Lanka in 1934 and 1935.

== Founding of Communist Party of Ceylon ==
In 1941, when Germany attacked the Soviet Union, Wickramasinghe led the faction who argued that World War 2 was not an inter-imperialist war but a war against fascism. For their defence of Stalin and the Soviet Union, Wickramasinghe and his comrades were expelled by the Trotskyites in the LSSP.

Wickramasinghe's faction, which included Pieter Keuneman, M. G. Mendis, and A. Vaidialingam formed the United Socialist Party, which became the Communist Party of Ceylon in 1943.

== Personal life ==
Wickramasinghe was married to Doreen Young, a British leftist who later became a prominent Communist politician and a Member of Parliament in Sri Lanka. She and Wickremasinghe had two children.

== Publications ==
- The Gal Oya Project (1951)
- The Way Ahead

== Electoral history ==
Electoral history of S. A. Wickramasinghe
Election	Constituency	Party	Votes	Result
1931 state council	Morawaka			Elected
1936 state council	Morawaka			Not elected
1946 state council by	Morawaka			Elected
1950 parliamentary by	Colombo Central	Communist Party of Ceylon	12,501	Not elected
1952 parliamentary	Hakmana	Communist Party of Ceylon	12,601	Not elected
1956 parliamentary	Akuressa	Communist Party of Ceylon	20,867	Elected
1960 March parliamentary	Akuressa	Communist Party of Ceylon	13,191	Elected
1960 July parliamentary	Akuressa	Communist Party of Ceylon	12,488	Elected
1965 parliamentary	Akuressa	Communist Party of Ceylon	16,096	Elected
1970 parliamentary	Akuressa	Communist Party of Ceylon	20,007	Elected
1977 parliamentary	Akuressa	Communist Party of Sri Lanka	16,436	Not elected

== See also ==
- Suriya-Mal Movement
- Lanka Sama Samaja Party
