= Matara District =

Matara District මාතර දිස්ත්‍රික්කය மாத்தறை மாவட்டம்
- Administrative District
- Map of Sri Lanka with Matara District highlighted
- Coordinates: 6°10′N 80°30′E
- Country: Sri Lanka
- Province: Southern Province
- Largest City: Matara
- Divisions: List: Divisional Secretariats: 16; Grama Niladhari: 650

Government
  - District Secretary: Pradeep Ratnayaka
  - Local: List: Municipal Councils: 1; Urban Councils: 1; Pradeishiya Sabhas: 10

Area
  - Total: 1,282.5 km^{2} (495.2 sq mi)

Population (2012)
  - Total: 809,344
  - Density: 631.07/km^{2} (1,634.5/sq mi)
- Time zone: UTC+05:30 (Sri Lanka)
- ISO 3166 code: LK-32
- Website: matara.dist.gov.lk/

Matara (Sinhala: මාතර දිස්ත්‍රික්කය Mātara distrikkaya; Tamil: மாத்தறை மாவட்டம் Māttaṛai māvaṭṭam) is a district in Southern Province, Sri Lanka. It is one of 25 districts of Sri Lanka, the second level administrative division of the country. The district is administered by a District Secretariat headed by a District Secretary (previously known as a Government Agent) appointed by the central government of Sri Lanka.

== Geography ==
Matara District is located in the south west of Sri Lanka and has an area of 1,282.5 square kilometres (495.2 sq mi).

It is represented in the Sri Lankan Parliament following the 2010 Sri Lankan parliamentary election by former Sri Lankan national cricketer Sanath Jayasuriya who stood for the United People's Freedom Alliance.

== Administrative units ==
Matara District is divided into 16 Divisional Secretary's Division (DS Divisions), each headed by a Divisional Secretary (previously known as an Assistant Government Agent). The DS Divisions are further sub-divided into 650 Grama Niladhari Divisions (GN Divisions), with 1,658 villages.

DS Division	Main town	Divisional Secretary	GN Divisions	Area (km^{2})	Population (2012 Census)						Population density (/km^{2})
DS Division	Main town	Divisional Secretary	GN Divisions	Area (km^{2})	Sinhalese	Sri Lankan Moors	Sri Lankan Tamil	Indian Tamil	Other	Total	Population density (/km^{2})
Akuressa	Akuressa	Mr. O. V. Chandana Tilakerathne	46	148.8	51,280	7	519	865	5	52,595	357
Athuraliya	Athuraliya	Mr. T. G. S. Sarath Kumara	28	62.9	29,674	1,675	602	155	67	31,869	512
Devinuwara	Devinuwara	Mr. D. D. K. Wickramarachchi	41	39.9	47,217	663	66	14	19	47,979	1,183
Dickwella	Dickwella	Mr. B. S. Ranjitha	48	51.9	51,530	2,680	70	81	9	54,187	1,055
Hakmana	Hakmana	Mr. Kusalaka Nanayakkara	34	47.7	30,465	977	16	1	5	31,892	-
Kamburupitiya	Kamburupitiya	Mrs. N. M. M. W. W. N. Herath Kumari	39	60.9	40,738	10	28	17	10	39,438	676
Kirinda Puhuwella	Kirinda Puhuwella	Mr. Chinthaka Abeywickrama	25	37.5	19,480	648	5	-	2	20,574	655
Kotapola	Kotapola	Mr. Ganesha Amarasinghe	37	175.6	51,057	110	4,041	7,855	9	67,596	389
Malimbada	Malimbada	Mrs. Deepika Kumari Gunarathne	66	44.7	34,180	476	51	21	7	33,289	753
Matara	Matara	Mr. Ranjith Yapa	29	53.9	110,221	4,314	304	22	109	114,298	2,144
Mulatiyana	Mulatiyana	Mr. Susantha Attanayake	48	115.2	49,689	1	192	61	-	48,645	427
Pasgoda	Pasgoda	Mrs. Nadeeka Kaushalya Kumari	43	148.2	57,224	2	347	1,289	7	59,285	404
Pitabeddara	Pitabeddara	Mr. Ravindra Jayanath	40	141.5	47,149	24	2,086	1,555	13	52,081	372
Thihagoda	Thihagoda	Mrs. K. P. C. N. Mahindagnana	40	45.2	33,168	8	16	-	10	32,640	730
Weligama	Weligama	Mr. K. P. G. Sumith Shantha	48	44.0	64,927	7,366	159	26	33	70,180	1,120
Welipitiya	Welipitiya	Mrs. Tushari Sooriyarachchi	38	64.4	45,122	6,339	60	22	72	48,756	1,102
Total			650	1,282.5	757,046	23,635	5,060	17,937	321	803,999	638

== Major cities ==
- Matara (Municipal Council)

== Other towns ==
- Aparekka
- Weligama (Weligama Urban Council)
- Akuressa
- Tihagoda
- Mirissa
- Deniyaya
- Pitabeddara
- Kamburupitiya
- Thelijjawila
- Malimbada
- Miella
- Welipitiya
- Denipitiya
- Welihinda
- Morawaka
- Nupe
- Devinuwara
- Gandara
- Hakmana
- Karaputugala

== Demographics ==
=== Population ===
Matara District's population was 803,999 in 2012. The majority of the population are Sinhalese, with a minority Sri Lankan Moor and Indian Tamil population.

=== Ethnicity ===
Ethnicity in Matara District (2024)
1. Sinhala (94.1%)
2. Sri Lankan Moors (3.51%)
3. Sri Lankan Tamils (1.33%)
4. Hill Tamils (0.96%)
5. Others (0.06%)

Population of Matara District by ethnic group
Year	Sinhalese		Sri Lankan Moors		Sri Lankan Tamil		Indian Tamil		Other		Total No.
Year	No.	%	No.	%	No.	%	No.	%	No.	%	Total No.
2012 Census	757,046	94.16%	23,635	2.94%	5,060	0.63%	17,937	2.23%	321	0.04%	803,999

=== Religion ===
Religion in Matara district (2024)
Religion	Percent
Buddhism	93.96%
Islam	3.56%
Hinduism	1.75%
Other Christianity	0.43%
Other or not stated	0.30%

Population of Matara District by religion
Year	Buddhist		Muslim		Christian (Note: Roman Catholic and Other Christian.)		Hindu		Other		Total No.
Year	No.	%	No.	%	No.	%	No.	%	No.	%	Total No.
2012 Census	756,098	94.0%	18,908	2.35%	25,982	3.23%	2,901	0.36%	110	0.01%	803,999
