= Communist Party of Sri Lanka =

Communist Party of Sri Lanka ශ්‍රී ලංකාවේ කොමියුනිස්ට් පක්ෂය இலங்கை கம்யூனிஸ்ட் கட்சி
- General Secretary: Dr G. Weerasinghe
- Founder: S. A. Wickramasinghe
- Founded: 1943; 83 years ago
- Split from: LSSP
- Headquarters: 91 Dr N.M. Perera Mawatha, Colombo 08
- Newspaper: Aththa; Forward; Deshabhimani
- Youth wing: Communist Youth Federation
- Membership (1960): 1900
- Ideology: Communism; Marxism–Leninism
- Political position: Far-left
- National affiliation: Sarvajana Balaya; Formerly: FPA; ULS; SLPFA; UPFA; PA; United Front; United Left Front
- International affiliation: IMCWP
- Parliament of Sri Lanka: 0 / 225
- Local Government: 13 / 7,842

Election symbol
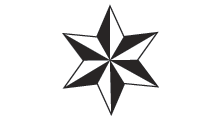
- Star

Party flag

Website
- cpsl.lk

The Communist Party of Sri Lanka (Sinhala: ශ්‍රී ලංකාවේ කොමියුනිස්ට් පක්ෂය, romanized: Sri Lankavay Komiyunist Pakshaya; Tamil: இலங்கை கம்யூனிஸ்ட் கட்சி, romanized: Ilankai Komyunist Katche) is a Marxist-Leninist party in Sri Lanka. In the 2004 legislative election, the party was part of the United People's Freedom Alliance that won 45.6% of the popular vote and 105 out of 225 seats.

== History ==
Communist Youth Federation

The CPSL was founded as the Communist Party of Ceylon in 1943 and was a continuation of the United Socialist Party. The USP had been formed out of the Marxist–Leninist wing of the Lanka Sama Samaja Party. The USP was proscribed by the colonial authorities.

The USP and then the CPC was initially led by Dr. S. A. Wickramasinghe.

In 1952 Wickremesinghe's wife, the English-born Doreen Young Wickremasinghe, a former leader of the Suriya-Mal Movement, was elected to the Sri Lankan parliament.

In 1963 the Communist Party, Lanka Sama Samaja Party and the Mahajana Eksath Peramuna formed the United Left Front (1963). The ULF broke down in 1964 when the then Prime Minister Sirimavo Bandaranaike offered ministerial posts to LSSP and the CP.

In the mid-1960s the U.S. State Department estimated the party membership to be approximately 1900.

In 1968, the CP joined the LSSP and the SLFP in the United Front. In the 1970 government, Pieter Keuneman became Minister of Housing and Construction and B. Y. Tudawe, Deputy Minister of Education. However, one faction of the party, led by S. A. Wickremasinghe and Indika Gunawardena, maintained a line of critical support for the government.

After the general election of 1977, for the first time in half a century, the CPSL found itself without parliamentary representation, receiving about 2% of the vote. However, after a subsequent election petition, Sarath Muttetuwegama was elected to the Kalawana seat in a by-election.

Later CPSL joined the People's Alliance, the front led by the Sri Lanka Freedom Party. When SLFP shelved the PA and formed the United People's Freedom Alliance together with Janatha Vimukthi Peramuna ahead of the 2004 elections, CPSL and LSSP initially stayed out. They did, however, sign a memorandum with the UPFA at a later stage and contested the elections on the UPFA platform. CPSL does not, however, consider itself a member of UPFA.

The CPSL had one member of parliament in 2004, party general secretary D.E.W. Gunasekara. Gunasekara contested the Sri Lankan parliament speaker election but lost by a handful of votes. Gunasekara was then sworn in as the Minister for Constitutional Affairs.

During the 2020 Parliamentary elections, the CPSL put forward two candidates, Mahesh Almedia in Colombo and Weerasumana Weerasinghe in Matara, under the SLPP's Pohottuwa symbol. Dr G. Weerasinghe was nominated for the party's National List. Weerasumana was the only candidate to successfully enter Parliament with 77,968 preferential votes.

Gunasekera stepped down as General Secretary of the CPSL on 30 August 2020. Dr G. Weerasinghe was unanimously elected as the new General Secretary by the Central Committee.

== Party organization ==
The youth wing of CPSL is the Communist Youth Federation. CYF is a member organization of the World Federation of Democratic Youth.

== Allegations ==
The CPSL and other Leftist parties were framed by the J R Jayawardane government for instigating 1983 Black July pogroms against the Tamil people. The party was banned and leaders including D.E.W. Gunasekera were imprisoned for over a year. The ban was lifted due to the lack of evidence for the charges and intervention from the Soviet embassy. The ban on the JVP and NSSP stayed the same.

== Publications ==
Aththa (Truth) is the CPSL's flagship Sinhala newspaper, which was renowned for its high standard of journalism, progressive editorials and Sinhala prose.

The English organ of the CPSL was the Forward weekly.

== Electoral history ==
=== Presidential ===
Election year	Candidate	Votes	Vote %	Result
2024	Dilith Jayaweera	122,396	0.92%	6th

=== Parliamentary ===
Election year	Votes	Vote %	Seats won	+/–	Result for the party
1947	70,331	3.73%	3 / 95	▲3	Opposition
1952	134,528	5.78%	3 / 95	Steady	Opposition
1956	119,715	4.52%	3 / 95	Steady	Opposition
1960 (March)	147,612	4.85%	3 / 151	Steady	Opposition
1960 (July)	90,219	2.93%	4 / 151	▲1	Opposition
1965	109,754	2.71%	4 / 151	Steady	Opposition
1970	169,199	3.39%	6 / 151	▲2	Government
1977	123,856	1.98%	0 / 168	▼6	Extra parliamentary
1989	Part of USA		0 / 225	Steady	Extra parliamentary
1994	Part of PA		0 / 225	Steady	Extra parliamentary
2000	Part of PA		1 / 225	▲1	Government
2001	Part of PA		1 / 225	Steady	Opposition
2004	Part of UPFA		2 / 225	▲1	Government
2010	Part of UPFA		2 / 225	Steady	Government
2015	Part of UPFA		1 / 225	▼1	Opposition
2020	Part of SLPFA		1 / 225	Steady	Government (2019–2022)
2020	Part of SLPFA		1 / 225	Steady	Opposition (since 2022)

== See also ==
- Ceylon Communist Party (Maoist)
- Communist Party of Sri Lanka (Marxist-Leninist)
- New-Democratic Marxist-Leninist Party
