= Thumbe, Sri Lanka =

Thumbe
- Location within Sri Lanka
- Coordinates: 6°04′41″N 80°35′33″E
- Country: Sri Lanka
- Province: Southern Province
- District: Matara District
- Elevation: 40 m (130 ft)

Population (2015)
  - Total: 566
  - Density: 807.9/km^{2} (2,092/sq mi)
- Time zone: UTC+5:30 (Sri Lanka Standard Time Zone)
  - Summer (DST): UTC+6 (Summer time)

Thumbe is a village which is located in the Matara District, Southern Province, Sri Lanka.

It is located on the B536 (Kamburupitiya-Kirinda Road), approximately 3 km (1.9 mi) east of Kamburupitiya and 20 km (12 mi) north of Matara.

Thumbe has a population of 566 (as of 2015) a decline of 42.9% from 992 in 2000 and 875 in 1990.

It falls within the Kamburupitiya Polling Division in the Matara Electoral District.

Thumbe is known for its woodworking artisans.
