= St. Thomas' College, Matara =

St. Thomas' College

Location
- Matara; Sri Lanka; 5°56′54″N 80°32′38″E

Information
- Type: National school
- Motto: Perseverando Vinces (Perseverance conquers all)
- Religious affiliation: Anglican Church of Ceylon
- Established: 9 March 1844; 182 years ago
- Founder: N. J. Ondatjee
- Authority: Ministry of Education
- Principal: Gayantha Wannige
- Staff: 144
- Grades: Primary to GCE A/L
- Gender: Boys
- Age: 6 to 19
- Enrollment: 3,600
- Colours: Chocolate, light blue
- Song: "Saint Thomas' forever"
- Rival: St. Servatius' College, Rahula College
- Website: stcmatara.lk

St. Thomas' College (සාන්ත තෝමස් විද්‍යාලය) is a government-aided boys' primary and secondary school in Matara, Sri Lanka. The college was established by Rev. Fr. N. J. Ondatjee, a missionary of the Christian Missionary Society of England in Wellamadama, Dondra. As of May 2025, the college has approximately 3,600 enrolled students for primary and secondary education.

== History ==
St. Thomas' College was founded on 9 March 1844 by the Christian Missionary Society of England. A main focus of the missionary bodies in Sri Lanka during the early period of British rule in Ceylon was providing English education. As a result, St. Thomas' School later became a secondary school in 1914, as St. Thomas' College was established in a bungalow in the village of Wellamadama, the current location of the University of Ruhuna.

The school was founded by one of the early Anglican missionaries, Rev. Fr. N. J. Ondatjee, in 1844 with several students and three teachers. Odantjee was later succeeded by others, including Kumaratunga Munidasa, who taught the Sinhala language and literature. In 1960, St. Thomas' College came under the control of the Government after a long period of missionary control. K. B. Jayasuriya became the first principal under the government administration. J. E. M. Fernando, K. B. Jayasuriya and E. A. de L. W. Samarasinghe reactivated the college's old boys (i.e., alumni) association, which was defunct after its inauguration by S. J. Gunasekeram in 1934. B. D. Jayasekera designed the college flag and the crest in the early 20th century.

A Buddhist shrine room was constructed at the college premises by the Old Boys Association in 1999. It was inaugurated by Madihe Pannaseeha Thero, a Buddhist priest and former student of the college.

== Past principals ==
- N. J. Ondatjee (1844–1848)
- Abraham Dias Abeysinghe (1848–1852)
- John Stevensen Lyle (1852 –1854)
- F. H. De Winton (1854–1856)
- Fedrick Dias Edirisinghe (1856–1858)
- Quancy Adams (1858–1860)
- Clement La–brooy (1860–1865)
- A. W. Wijesinghe (1865–1866)
- W. E. Ferdinando (1866–1872)
- R. O. Macalam (1872–1878)
- F. K. Dency (1878–1884)
- J. W. Bultjens (1884–1890)
- R. C. Reginold (1890–1896)
- L. A. Arndt (1896–1902)
- S. J. Gunasekeram (1902–1903)
- C.P. Fernando (1903–1910)
- J. C. Handy (1910–1915)
- M. S. Solomon (1915–1925)
- P. S. Adams (1925–1934)
- C. C. P. Arulpragasam (1934–1944)
- R. V. L. Pereira (1944–1952)
- J. E. M. Fernando (1952–1959)

Government Principals

- K. B. Jayasuriya (1960–1975)
- E. A. De L. W. Samarasinghe (1975–1985)
- B. G. Sisira (1985–1999)
- Ratnasiri Suraweera (1999–2011)
- W. B. Piyathissa (2011–2021)
- T. L. Dayashantha (2021–2022 )
- P. A. Weerakkodi (2022–2024)
- Nayanapriya Perera (2024–2026)
- Gayantha Wannige (2026-present)

== College anthem ==
The school anthem, "Saint Thomas' forever", was composed by Leonard Archibald Arndt (1889–1955), the school's principal between 1931 and 1933.

== College houses ==
There are four student houses in the college, named after four past principals. They are:

- Bultjens: red
- Dias: blue
- Ondatjee: yellow
- Edirisinhe: green

== Sports ==
The St. Thomas'-St. Servatius' cricket encounter, also known as "Battle of the Blues" or "Battle of the Blues Ruhuna", is an annual school cricket match played between St. Thomas' College, Matara, and St. Servatius' College since 1900. It is the second longest-running uninterrupted cricket encounter in Sri Lanka.

In addition to cricket, St. Thomas’ College competes annually against Rahula College, Matara in football in a match known as the "Battle of the Golden Ensigns", and also faces St. Servatius’ College in volleyball for the "Battle of the Saints’ Mathota" trophy annually since 2025.

== Notable alumni ==
List of alumni of St. Thomas' College, Matara;

Name	Notability	Reference
Politics
Senerat Gunewardene	Ceylon's first Permanent Representative to United Nations, member Parliament Gampola (1947–1948) and Ceylon's High Commissioner to United Kingdom (1961–1963)	
Justin Wijayawardhene	Member Parliament Matara (1960) Founding member of the United National Party	
Badi-ud-din Mahmud	Member Parliament Matara (1963–1977) and Minister of Education (1970–1977)	
Chandrasiri Gajadeera	Member Parliament Matara (1994–2001, 2004–2019)	
Weerasumana Weerasinghe	Member Parliament Matara (2019–present)	
Public Services
Madihe Pannaseeha Thero	Buddhist monk (head Amarapura sect 1969–2003)	
Cyril de Zoysa	President of the Senate of Ceylon (1960–1965), industrialist, philanthropist	
Jabez Gnanapragasam	Anglican Bishop of Colombo (1987–1992)	
P. B. Illangasinghe	Sri Lankan notary public and musicologist	
Arts
Kumaratunga Munidasa	linguist, poet, author, journalist	
W Jayasiri	Sri Lankan Actor, Script Writer, lyricist	
Desmond de Silva	Singer	
Tissa Nagodavithana	Film preservationist	
Sports
Indika de Saram	International cricket player (1999–2000)	
Prabath Nissanka	International cricket player (2001–2003)	

== See also ==
- List of the oldest schools in Sri Lanka
- Lists of schools in Sri Lanka
