= Deniyaya Polling Division =

Deniyaya
- Polling Division
- Coordinates: 6.284619°N 80.489104°E
- Country: Sri Lanka
- Province: Southern Province, Sri Lanka
- Electoral District: Matara Electoral District

Area
  - Total: 312.8 km^{2} (120.8 sq mi)

Population (2012)
  - Total: 114,441
  - Density: 366/km^{2} (950/sq mi)
- ISO 3166 code: EC-08A

The Deniyaya Polling Division is a Polling Division in the Matara Electoral District, in the Southern Province, Sri Lanka.

== Presidential Election Results ==
=== Summary ===
The winner of Deniyaya has matched the final country result 6 out of 8 times.

Year	Deniyaya	Matara Electoral District	MAE %	Sri Lanka	MAE %
2019	SLPP	SLPP	3.14%	SLPP	11.08%
2015	UPFA	UPFA	0.29%	NDF	9.88%
2010	UPFA	UPFA	0.32%	UPFA	7.74%
2005	UPFA	UPFA	5.82%	UPFA	5.72%
1999	PA	PA	1.49%	PA	2.71%
1994	PA	PA	3.96%	PA	1.59%
1988	SLFP	SLFP	3.74%	UNP	4.40%
1982	UNP	UNP	2.08%	UNP	1.64%
Matches/Mean MAE	6/8	6/8	2.60%	8/8	5.59%

=== 2019 Sri Lankan Presidential Election ===
Party	Deniyaya		Matara Electoral District		Sri Lanka	
Party	Votes	%	Votes	%	Votes	%
SLPP	54,472	64.04%	374,481	67.25%	6,924,255	52.25%
NDF	25,763	30.29%	149,026	26.76%	5,564,239	41.99%
NMPP	2,786	3.28%	23,439	4.21%	418,553	3.16%
Other Parties (with < 1%)	2,041	2.40%	9,922	1.78%	345,452	2.61%
Valid Votes	85,062	99.15%	556,868	99.33%	13,252,499	98.99%
Rejected Votes	731	0.85%	3,782	0.67%	135,452	1.01%
Total Polled	85,793	85.57%	560,650	85.93%	13,387,951	83.71%
Registered Electors	100,264		652,417		15,992,568	

=== 2015 Sri Lankan Presidential Election ===
Party	Deniyaya		Matara Electoral District		Sri Lanka	
Party	Votes	%	Votes	%	Votes	%
UPFA	44,273	57.39%	297,823	57.81%	5,768,090	47.58%
NDF	31,716	41.12%	212,435	41.24%	6,217,162	51.28%
Other Parties (with < 1%)	1,149	1.49%	4,892	0.95%	138,200	1.14%
Valid Votes	77,138	98.73%	515,150	99.06%	12,123,452	98.85%
Rejected Votes	990	1.27%	4,891	0.94%	140,925	1.15%
Total Polled	78,128	80.04%	520,041	80.23%	12,264,377	78.69%
Registered Electors	97,610		648,213		15,585,942	

=== 2010 Sri Lankan Presidential Election ===
Party	Deniyaya		Matara Electoral District		Sri Lanka	
Party	Votes	%	Votes	%	Votes	%
UPFA	42,999	65.53%	296,155	65.53%	6,015,934	57.88%
NDF	20,939	31.91%	148,510	32.86%	4,173,185	40.15%
Other Parties (with < 1%)	1,675	2.55%	7,264	1.61%	204,494	1.97%
Valid Votes	65,613	99.06%	451,929	99.34%	10,393,613	99.03%
Rejected Votes	624	0.94%	3,025	0.66%	101,838	0.97%
Total Polled	66,237	76.74%	454,954	76.51%	10,495,451	66.70%
Registered Electors	86,311		594,628		15,734,587	

=== 2005 Sri Lankan Presidential Election ===
Party	Deniyaya		Matara Electoral District		Sri Lanka	
Party	Votes	%	Votes	%	Votes	%
UPFA	36,916	55.79%	279,411	61.85%	4,887,152	50.29%
UNP	28,015	42.34%	165,837	36.71%	4,706,366	48.43%
Other Parties (with < 1%)	1,242	1.88%	6,474	1.43%	123,521	1.27%
Valid Votes	66,173	98.69%	451,722	99.11%	9,717,039	98.88%
Rejected Votes	879	1.31%	4,077	0.89%	109,869	1.12%
Total Polled	67,052	81.14%	455,799	78.95%	9,826,908	69.51%
Registered Electors	82,636		577,327		14,136,979	

=== 1999 Sri Lankan Presidential Election ===
Party	Deniyaya		Matara Electoral District		Sri Lanka	
Party	Votes	%	Votes	%	Votes	%
PA	29,229	53.09%	205,685	54.32%	4,312,157	51.12%
UNP	21,400	38.87%	139,677	36.89%	3,602,748	42.71%
JVP	3,108	5.65%	26,229	6.93%	343,927	4.08%
Other Parties (with < 1%)	1,318	2.39%	7,047	1.86%	176,679	2.09%
Valid Votes	55,055	97.41%	378,638	97.78%	8,435,754	97.69%
Rejected Votes	1,464	2.59%	8,583	2.22%	199,536	2.31%
Total Polled	56,519	75.96%	387,221	73.90%	8,635,290	72.17%
Registered Electors	74,409		524,002		11,965,536	

=== 1994 Sri Lankan Presidential Election ===
Party	Deniyaya		Matara Electoral District		Sri Lanka	
Party	Votes	%	Votes	%	Votes	%
PA	30,662	60.40%	227,865	64.69%	4,709,205	62.28%
UNP	18,819	37.07%	118,224	33.56%	2,715,283	35.91%
Other Parties (with < 1%)	1,284	2.53%	6,150	1.75%	137,040	1.81%
Valid Votes	50,765	97.52%	352,239	98.40%	7,561,526	98.03%
Rejected Votes	1,293	2.48%	5,731	1.60%	151,706	1.97%
Total Polled	52,058	73.21%	357,970	69.93%	7,713,232	69.12%
Registered Electors	71,106		511,933		11,158,880	

=== 1988 Sri Lankan Presidential Election ===
Party	Deniyaya		Matara Electoral District		Sri Lanka	
Party	Votes	%	Votes	%	Votes	%
SLFP	10,949	50.55%	57,424	54.30%	2,289,857	44.95%
UNP	10,157	46.89%	45,399	42.93%	2,569,199	50.43%
SLMP	554	2.56%	2,922	2.76%	235,701	4.63%
Valid Votes	21,660	98.28%	105,745	98.14%	5,094,754	98.24%
Rejected Votes	378	1.72%	2,003	1.86%	91,499	1.76%
Total Polled	22,038	37.77%	107,748	23.80%	5,186,256	55.87%
Registered Electors	58,342		452,637		9,283,143	

=== 1982 Sri Lankan Presidential Election ===
Party	Deniyaya		Matara Electoral District		Sri Lanka	
Party	Votes	%	Votes	%	Votes	%
UNP	22,457	52.41%	164,725	49.32%	3,450,815	52.93%
SLFP	18,147	42.36%	144,587	43.29%	2,546,348	39.05%
JVP	1,886	4.40%	22,117	6.62%	273,428	4.19%
Other Parties (with < 1%)	355	0.83%	2,554	0.76%	249,460	3.83%
Valid Votes	42,845	99.01%	333,983	99.08%	6,520,156	98.78%
Rejected Votes	428	0.99%	3,091	0.92%	80,470	1.22%
Total Polled	43,273	86.86%	337,074	82.90%	6,600,626	80.15%
Registered Electors	49,817		406,595		8,235,358	

== Parliamentary Election Results ==
=== Summary ===
The winner of Deniyaya has matched the final country result 6 out of 7 times.

Year	Deniyaya	Matara Electoral District	MAE %	Sri Lanka	MAE %
2015	UPFA	UPFA	1.96%	UNP	5.45%
2010	UPFA	UPFA	1.19%	UPFA	4.32%
2004	UPFA	UPFA	3.96%	UPFA	6.15%
2001	UNP	UNP	1.45%	UNP	2.35%
2000	PA	PA	2.12%	PA	2.94%
1994	PA	PA	4.88%	PA	3.55%
1989	UNP	UNP	1.85%	UNP	5.34%
Matches/Mean MAE	6/7	6/7	2.49%	7/7	4.30%

=== 2015 Sri Lankan Parliamentary Election ===
Party	Deniyaya		Matara Electoral District		Sri Lanka	
Party	Votes	%	Votes	%	Votes	%
UPFA	36,532	51.49%	250,505	52.70%	4,732,664	42.48%
UNP	30,024	42.31%	186,675	39.27%	5,098,916	45.77%
JVP	4,070	5.74%	35,270	7.42%	544,154	4.88%
Other Parties (with < 1%)	328	0.46%	2,890	0.61%	62,184	0.56%
Valid Votes	70,954	96.17%	475,340	96.93%	11,140,333	95.35%
Rejected Votes	2,702	3.66%	12,692	2.59%	516,926	4.42%
Total Polled	73,776	75.58%	490,409	78.61%	11,684,111	77.66%
Registered Electors	97,610		623,818		15,044,490	

=== 2010 Sri Lankan Parliamentary Election ===
Party	Deniyaya		Matara Electoral District		Sri Lanka	
Party	Votes	%	Votes	%	Votes	%
UPFA	30,270	66.82%	213,937	65.31%	4,846,388	60.38%
UNP	12,737	28.12%	91,114	27.81%	2,357,057	29.37%
DNA	1,960	4.33%	20,465	6.25%	441,251	5.50%
Other Parties (with < 1%)	333	0.74%	2,066	0.63%	53,531	0.67%
Valid Votes	45,300	94.34%	327,582	95.82%	8,026,322	96.03%
Rejected Votes	2,718	5.66%	14,289	4.18%	581,465	6.96%
Total Polled	48,018	55.63%	341,871	59.06%	8,358,246	59.29%
Registered Electors	86,311		578,858		14,097,690	

=== 2004 Sri Lankan Parliamentary Election ===
Party	Deniyaya		Matara Electoral District		Sri Lanka	
Party	Votes	%	Votes	%	Votes	%
UPFA	33,051	56.79%	241,235	60.27%	4,223,126	45.70%
UNP	23,262	39.97%	139,633	34.89%	3,486,792	37.73%
JHU	1,197	2.06%	16,229	4.05%	552,723	5.98%
Other Parties (with < 1%)	692	1.19%	3,136	0.78%	54,133	0.59%
Valid Votes	58,202	92.76%	400,233	94.62%	9,241,931	94.52%
Rejected Votes	4,545	7.24%	22,769	5.38%	534,452	5.47%
Total Polled	62,747	78.18%	423,002	76.84%	9,777,821	75.74%
Registered Electors	80,259		550,506		12,909,631	

=== 2001 Sri Lankan Parliamentary Election ===
Party	Deniyaya		Matara Electoral District		Sri Lanka	
Party	Votes	%	Votes	%	Votes	%
UNP	26,114	44.70%	171,661	42.49%	4,086,026	45.62%
PA	24,399	41.76%	171,141	42.37%	3,330,815	37.19%
JVP	6,776	11.60%	54,476	13.49%	815,353	9.10%
Other Parties (with < 1%)	1,134	1.94%	6,689	1.66%	133,373	1.49%
Valid Votes	58,423	93.55%	403,967	95.10%	8,955,844	94.77%
Rejected Votes	4,030	6.45%	20,820	4.90%	494,009	5.23%
Total Polled	62,453	80.54%	424,787	79.44%	9,449,878	76.03%
Registered Electors	77,540		534,694		12,428,762	

=== 2000 Sri Lankan Parliamentary Election ===
Party	Deniyaya		Matara Electoral District		Sri Lanka	
Party	Votes	%	Votes	%	Votes	%
PA	29,427	50.80%	203,690	51.47%	3,899,329	45.33%
UNP	23,807	41.10%	146,855	37.11%	3,451,765	40.12%
JVP	3,986	6.88%	38,757	9.79%	518,725	6.03%
Other Parties (with < 1%)	710	1.23%	6,462	1.63%	238,931	2.78%
Valid Votes	57,930	N/A	395,764	N/A	8,602,617	N/A

=== 1994 Sri Lankan Parliamentary Election ===
Party	Deniyaya		Matara Electoral District		Sri Lanka	
Party	Votes	%	Votes	%	Votes	%
PA	30,743	55.29%	227,285	59.90%	3,887,805	48.94%
UNP	23,930	43.03%	142,024	37.43%	3,498,370	44.04%
SLPF	756	1.36%	8,736	2.30%	90,078	1.13%
Other Parties (with < 1%)	178	0.32%	1,422	0.37%	68,538	0.86%
Valid Votes	55,607	94.35%	379,467	95.67%	7,943,688	95.20%
Rejected Votes	3,330	5.65%	17,167	4.33%	400,395	4.80%
Total Polled	58,937	82.89%	396,634	77.60%	8,344,095	74.75%
Registered Electors	71,106		511,109		11,163,064	

=== 1989 Sri Lankan Parliamentary Election ===
Party	Deniyaya		Matara Electoral District		Sri Lanka	
Party	Votes	%	Votes	%	Votes	%
UNP	3,556	57.76%	45,734	56.11%	2,838,005	50.71%
SLFP	2,301	37.37%	28,752	35.28%	1,785,369	31.90%
MEP	105	1.71%	1,313	1.61%	90,480	1.62%
USA	104	1.69%	4,225	5.18%	141,983	2.54%
ELJP	91	1.48%	1,481	1.82%	67,723	1.21%
Valid Votes	6,157	91.57%	81,505	94.08%	5,596,468	93.87%
Rejected Votes	567	8.43%	5,128	5.92%	365,563	6.13%
Total Polled	6,724	11.59%	86,633	19.17%	5,962,031	63.60%
Registered Electors	58,008		451,926		9,374,164	

== Demographics ==
=== Ethnicity ===
The Deniyaya Polling Division has a Sinhalese majority (86.2%) . In comparison, the Matara Electoral District (which contains the Deniyaya Polling Division) has a Sinhalese majority (94.3%)

Ethnicity in Deniyaya
1. Sinhalese (86.2%)
2. Indian Tamil (8.30%)
3. Sri Lankan Tamil (5.30%)
4. Other (0.10%)

=== Religion ===
The Deniyaya Polling Division has a Buddhist majority (86.3%) and a significant Hindu population (10.9%) . In comparison, the Matara Electoral District (which contains the Deniyaya Polling Division) has a Buddhist majority (94.1%)

Religion in Deniyaya
1. Buddhist (86.3%)
2. Hindu (10.9%)
3. Other Christian (1.50%)
4. Roman Catholic (1.00%)
5. Other (0.20%)
