= Akram Ilyas =

Deputy Minister of Energy of Srilanka

Hon. Arkam Ilyas MP
- අර්කම් ඉල්යාස් அர்கம் இல்யாஸ்

Member of Parliament for Matara District
- Incumbent
- Assumed office 21 November 2024
- Majority: 53,835 Preferential votes

Personal details
- Party: National People's Power
- Education: University of Moratuwa
- Profession: Engineer

Akram Ilyas is a Sri Lankan politician and a member of the Parliament of Sri Lanka from Matara Electoral District since 2024 as a member of the National People's Power. He also served as Deputy Energy Minister in the government.

== Electoral history ==
Electoral history of
Election	Constituency	Party	Votes	Result	Ref
2024 parliamentary	Matara District	National People's Power	53,835	Elected	
