= Jinadasa Kitulagoda =

Sri Lankan politician

Hon. Jinadasa Kitulagoda MP

Member of Parliament for Matara District
- In office 2000–2010

Personal details
- Party: Janatha Vimukthi Peramuna

Jinadasa Kitulagoda is a Sri Lankan politician and a former member of the Parliament of Sri Lanka. He represents the people's liberation front political party. He lives in Pannipitiya, Colombo district.
