= Chandrasiri Gajadeera =

Sri Lankan politician (1946–2019)

Hon. Chandrasiri Gajadeera MP

Deputy Minister of Vocational Training
- In office 2000–2001

Deputy Minister of Housing & Construction Industry, Eastern Province Education & Irrigation Development

Non-Cabinet Minister of Home Affairs
- In office 2007–2010

Deputy Minister of Finance & Planning
- In office 2010 – 12 January 2015

Member of Parliament for Matara District
- In office 2004 – 6 September 2019
- In office 1994–2001

Personal details
- Born: 26 February 1946
- Died: 6 September 2019 (aged 73)
- Party: Communist Party of Sri Lanka
- Other political affiliations: United People's Freedom Alliance
- Education: St. Thomas' College, Matara
- Profession: Attorney-at-Law

Chandrasiri Gajadeera (26 February 1946 – 6 September 2019) was a Sri Lankan politician, a member of the Parliament of Sri Lanka and Minister of Rehabilitation and Prisons.
