= Weligama Polling Division =

Weligama
- Polling Division
- Coordinates: 5.985803°N 80.445473°E
- Country: Sri Lanka
- Province: Southern Province, Sri Lanka
- Electoral District: Matara Electoral District

Area
  - Total: 108.78 km^{2} (42.00 sq mi)

Population (2012)
  - Total: 124,941
  - Density: 1,149/km^{2} (2,980/sq mi)
- ISO 3166 code: EC-08G

The Weligama Polling Division is a Polling Division in the Matara Electoral District, in the Southern Province, Sri Lanka.

== Presidential Election Results ==
=== Summary ===
The winner of Weligama has matched the final country result 6 out of 8 times. Hence, Weligama is a Weak Bellwether for Presidential Elections.

Year	Weligama	Matara Electoral District	MAE %	Sri Lanka	MAE %
2019	SLPP	SLPP	1.52%	SLPP	12.61%
2015	UPFA	UPFA	2.49%	NDF	7.52%
2010	UPFA	UPFA	1.20%	UPFA	6.14%
2005	UPFA	UPFA	0.40%	UPFA	11.07%
1999	PA	PA	1.91%	PA	6.16%
1994	PA	PA	1.67%	PA	4.00%
1988	SLFP	SLFP	4.47%	UNP	12.41%
1982	UNP	UNP	1.10%	UNP	3.73%
Matches/Mean MAE	6/8	6/8	1.84%	8/8	7.95%

=== 2019 Sri Lankan Presidential Election ===
Party	Weligama		Matara Electoral District		Sri Lanka	
Party	Votes	%	Votes	%	Votes	%
SLPP	52,439	65.93%	374,481	67.25%	6,924,255	52.25%
NDF	23,065	29.00%	149,026	26.76%	5,564,239	41.99%
NMPP	2,692	3.38%	23,439	4.21%	418,553	3.16%
Other Parties (with < 1%)	1,341	1.69%	9,922	1.78%	345,452	2.61%
Valid Votes	79,537	99.39%	556,868	99.33%	13,252,499	98.99%
Rejected Votes	491	0.61%	3,782	0.67%	135,452	1.01%
Total Polled	80,028	84.55%	560,650	85.93%	13,387,951	83.71%
Registered Electors	94,655		652,417		15,992,568	

=== 2015 Sri Lankan Presidential Election ===
Party	Weligama		Matara Electoral District		Sri Lanka	
Party	Votes	%	Votes	%	Votes	%
UPFA	40,715	55.36%	297,823	57.81%	5,768,090	47.58%
NDF	32,247	43.85%	212,435	41.24%	6,217,162	51.28%
Other Parties (with < 1%)	583	0.79%	4,892	0.95%	138,200	1.14%
Valid Votes	73,545	99.28%	515,150	99.06%	12,123,452	98.85%
Rejected Votes	534	0.72%	4,891	0.94%	140,925	1.15%
Total Polled	74,079	79.27%	520,041	80.23%	12,264,377	78.69%
Registered Electors	93,450		648,213		15,585,942	

=== 2010 Sri Lankan Presidential Election ===
Party	Weligama		Matara Electoral District		Sri Lanka	
Party	Votes	%	Votes	%	Votes	%
UPFA	41,359	64.37%	296,155	65.53%	6,015,934	57.88%
NDF	21,978	34.20%	148,510	32.86%	4,173,185	40.15%
Other Parties (with < 1%)	917	1.43%	7,264	1.61%	204,494	1.97%
Valid Votes	64,254	99.48%	451,929	99.34%	10,393,613	99.03%
Rejected Votes	333	0.52%	3,025	0.66%	101,838	0.97%
Total Polled	64,587	74.49%	454,954	76.51%	10,495,451	66.70%
Registered Electors	86,711		594,628		15,734,587	

=== 2005 Sri Lankan Presidential Election ===
Party	Weligama		Matara Electoral District		Sri Lanka	
Party	Votes	%	Votes	%	Votes	%
UPFA	40,027	61.52%	279,411	61.85%	4,887,152	50.29%
UNP	24,225	37.23%	165,837	36.71%	4,706,366	48.43%
Other Parties (with < 1%)	813	1.25%	6,474	1.43%	123,521	1.27%
Valid Votes	65,065	99.13%	451,722	99.11%	9,717,039	98.88%
Rejected Votes	568	0.87%	4,077	0.89%	109,869	1.12%
Total Polled	65,633	77.57%	455,799	78.95%	9,826,908	69.51%
Registered Electors	84,614		577,327		14,136,979	

=== 1999 Sri Lankan Presidential Election ===
Party	Weligama		Matara Electoral District		Sri Lanka	
Party	Votes	%	Votes	%	Votes	%
PA	30,939	56.59%	205,685	54.32%	4,312,157	51.12%
UNP	19,183	35.09%	139,677	36.89%	3,602,748	42.71%
JVP	3,674	6.72%	26,229	6.93%	343,927	4.08%
Other Parties (with < 1%)	878	1.61%	7,047	1.86%	176,679	2.09%
Valid Votes	54,674	98.16%	378,638	97.78%	8,435,754	97.69%
Rejected Votes	1,027	1.84%	8,583	2.22%	199,536	2.31%
Total Polled	55,701	71.12%	387,221	73.90%	8,635,290	72.17%
Registered Electors	78,320		524,002		11,965,536	

=== 1994 Sri Lankan Presidential Election ===
Party	Weligama		Matara Electoral District		Sri Lanka	
Party	Votes	%	Votes	%	Votes	%
PA	34,583	66.53%	227,865	64.69%	4,709,205	62.28%
UNP	16,708	32.14%	118,224	33.56%	2,715,283	35.91%
Other Parties (with < 1%)	691	1.33%	6,150	1.75%	137,040	1.81%
Valid Votes	51,982	98.72%	352,239	98.40%	7,561,526	98.03%
Rejected Votes	675	1.28%	5,731	1.60%	151,706	1.97%
Total Polled	52,657	67.96%	357,970	69.93%	7,713,232	69.12%
Registered Electors	77,479		511,933		11,158,880	

=== 1988 Sri Lankan Presidential Election ===
Party	Weligama		Matara Electoral District		Sri Lanka	
Party	Votes	%	Votes	%	Votes	%
SLFP	15,802	59.22%	57,424	54.30%	2,289,857	44.95%
UNP	10,351	38.79%	45,399	42.93%	2,569,199	50.43%
SLMP	532	1.99%	2,922	2.76%	235,701	4.63%
Valid Votes	26,685	98.02%	105,745	98.14%	5,094,754	98.24%
Rejected Votes	540	1.98%	2,003	1.86%	91,499	1.76%
Total Polled	27,225	38.57%	107,748	23.80%	5,186,256	55.87%
Registered Electors	70,591		452,637		9,283,143	

=== 1982 Sri Lankan Presidential Election ===
Party	Weligama		Matara Electoral District		Sri Lanka	
Party	Votes	%	Votes	%	Votes	%
UNP	25,051	50.13%	164,725	49.32%	3,450,815	52.93%
SLFP	22,282	44.59%	144,587	43.29%	2,546,348	39.05%
JVP	2,276	4.55%	22,117	6.62%	273,428	4.19%
Other Parties (with < 1%)	366	0.73%	2,554	0.76%	249,460	3.83%
Valid Votes	49,975	99.11%	333,983	99.08%	6,520,156	98.78%
Rejected Votes	451	0.89%	3,091	0.92%	80,470	1.22%
Total Polled	50,426	80.39%	337,074	82.90%	6,600,626	80.15%
Registered Electors	62,725		406,595		8,235,358	

== Parliamentary Election Results ==
=== Summary ===
The winner of Weligama has matched the final country result 5 out of 7 times. Hence, Weligama is a Weak Bellwether for Parliamentary Elections.

Year	Weligama	Matara Electoral District	MAE %	Sri Lanka	MAE %
2015	UPFA	UPFA	1.43%	UNP	5.98%
2010	UPFA	UPFA	0.30%	UPFA	3.76%
2004	UPFA	UPFA	0.13%	UPFA	7.96%
2001	PA	UNP	1.14%	UNP	4.85%
2000	PA	PA	0.91%	PA	5.12%
1994	PA	PA	2.81%	PA	11.02%
1989	UNP	UNP	5.37%	UNP	3.64%
Matches/Mean MAE	5/7	6/7	1.73%	7/7	6.05%

=== 2015 Sri Lankan Parliamentary Election ===
Party	Weligama		Matara Electoral District		Sri Lanka	
Party	Votes	%	Votes	%	Votes	%
UPFA	35,044	51.87%	250,505	52.70%	4,732,664	42.48%
UNP	28,075	41.56%	186,675	39.27%	5,098,916	45.77%
JVP	4,105	6.08%	35,270	7.42%	544,154	4.88%
Other Parties (with < 1%)	337	0.50%	2,890	0.61%	62,184	0.56%
Valid Votes	67,561	97.43%	475,340	96.93%	11,140,333	95.35%
Rejected Votes	1,634	2.36%	12,692	2.59%	516,926	4.42%
Total Polled	69,340	74.20%	490,409	78.61%	11,684,111	77.66%
Registered Electors	93,450		623,818		15,044,490	

=== 2010 Sri Lankan Parliamentary Election ===
Party	Weligama		Matara Electoral District		Sri Lanka	
Party	Votes	%	Votes	%	Votes	%
UPFA	29,814	65.62%	213,937	65.31%	4,846,388	60.38%
UNP	12,482	27.47%	91,114	27.81%	2,357,057	29.37%
DNA	2,812	6.19%	20,465	6.25%	441,251	5.50%
Other Parties (with < 1%)	328	0.72%	2,066	0.63%	53,531	0.67%
Valid Votes	45,436	96.16%	327,582	95.82%	8,026,322	96.03%
Rejected Votes	1,812	3.84%	14,289	4.18%	581,465	6.96%
Total Polled	47,248	54.49%	341,871	59.06%	8,358,246	59.29%
Registered Electors	86,711		578,858		14,097,690	

=== 2004 Sri Lankan Parliamentary Election ===
Party	Weligama		Matara Electoral District		Sri Lanka	
Party	Votes	%	Votes	%	Votes	%
UPFA	34,824	60.34%	241,235	60.27%	4,223,126	45.70%
UNP	19,996	34.64%	139,633	34.89%	3,486,792	37.73%
JHU	2,462	4.27%	16,229	4.05%	552,723	5.98%
Other Parties (with < 1%)	435	0.75%	3,136	0.78%	54,133	0.59%
Valid Votes	57,717	94.40%	400,233	94.62%	9,241,931	94.52%
Rejected Votes	3,422	5.60%	22,769	5.38%	534,452	5.47%
Total Polled	61,139	73.41%	423,002	76.84%	9,777,821	75.74%
Registered Electors	83,288		550,506		12,909,631	

=== 2001 Sri Lankan Parliamentary Election ===
Party	Weligama		Matara Electoral District		Sri Lanka	
Party	Votes	%	Votes	%	Votes	%
PA	25,703	43.64%	171,141	42.37%	3,330,815	37.19%
UNP	24,241	41.15%	171,661	42.49%	4,086,026	45.62%
JVP	8,058	13.68%	54,476	13.49%	815,353	9.10%
Other Parties (with < 1%)	901	1.53%	6,689	1.66%	133,373	1.49%
Valid Votes	58,903	95.76%	403,967	95.10%	8,955,844	94.77%
Rejected Votes	2,608	4.24%	20,820	4.90%	494,009	5.23%
Total Polled	61,511	75.87%	424,787	79.44%	9,449,878	76.03%
Registered Electors	81,072		534,694		12,428,762	

=== 2000 Sri Lankan Parliamentary Election ===
Party	Weligama		Matara Electoral District		Sri Lanka	
Party	Votes	%	Votes	%	Votes	%
PA	29,608	51.86%	203,690	51.47%	3,899,329	45.33%
UNP	20,276	35.51%	146,855	37.11%	3,451,765	40.12%
JVP	6,262	10.97%	38,757	9.79%	518,725	6.03%
Other Parties (with < 1%)	949	1.66%	6,462	1.63%	238,931	2.78%
Valid Votes	57,095	N/A	395,764	N/A	8,602,617	N/A

=== 1994 Sri Lankan Parliamentary Election ===
Party	Weligama		Matara Electoral District		Sri Lanka	
Party	Votes	%	Votes	%	Votes	%
PA	34,760	62.57%	227,285	59.90%	3,887,805	48.94%
UNP	19,013	34.22%	142,024	37.43%	3,498,370	44.04%
SLPF	1,600	2.88%	8,736	2.30%	90,078	1.13%
Other Parties (with < 1%)	182	0.33%	1,422	0.37%	68,538	0.86%
Valid Votes	55,555	95.98%	379,467	95.67%	7,943,688	95.20%
Rejected Votes	2,325	4.02%	17,167	4.33%	400,395	4.80%
Total Polled	57,880	74.70%	396,634	77.60%	8,344,095	74.75%
Registered Electors	77,479		511,109		11,163,064	

=== 1989 Sri Lankan Parliamentary Election ===
Party	Weligama		Matara Electoral District		Sri Lanka	
Party	Votes	%	Votes	%	Votes	%
UNP	9,141	51.31%	45,734	56.11%	2,838,005	50.71%
SLFP	7,508	42.14%	28,752	35.28%	1,785,369	31.90%
MEP	754	4.23%	1,313	1.61%	90,480	1.62%
USA	262	1.47%	4,225	5.18%	141,983	2.54%
Other Parties (with < 1%)	151	0.85%	1,481	1.82%	67,723	1.21%
Valid Votes	17,816	93.51%	81,505	94.08%	5,596,468	93.87%
Rejected Votes	1,237	6.49%	5,128	5.92%	365,563	6.13%
Total Polled	19,053	27.41%	86,633	19.17%	5,962,031	63.60%
Registered Electors	69,515		451,926		9,374,164	

== Demographics ==
=== Ethnicity ===
The Weligama Polling Division has a Sinhalese majority (88.7%) and a significant Moor population (10.9%) . In comparison, the Matara Electoral District (which contains the Weligama Polling Division) has a Sinhalese majority (94.3%)

Ethnicity in Weligama
1. Sinhalese (88.7%)
2. Moor (10.9%)
3. Other (0.30%)

=== Religion ===
The Weligama Polling Division has a Buddhist majority (88.5%) and a significant Muslim population (11.0%) . In comparison, the Matara Electoral District (which contains the Weligama Polling Division) has a Buddhist majority (94.1%)

Religion in Weligama
1. Buddhist (88.5%)
2. Muslim (11.0%)
3. Other (0.50%)
