= Weerasumana Weerasinghe =

Sri Lankan politician

Hon. Weerasumana Weerasinghe
- වීරසුමන වීරසිංහ வீரசுமன வீரசிங்க

Member of the Parliament of Sri Lanka
- Incumbent
- Assumed office 2020
- Constituency: Matara District

Member of the Southern Provincial Council
- In office 2004–2019
- Constituency: Matara District

Personal details
- Born: 17 November 1975 (age 50)
- Party: Communist Party of Sri Lanka
- Other political affiliations: Sarvajana Balaya (Present); Freedom People's Alliance (2023 - 2024); Sri Lanka People's Freedom Alliance (2023)

Gamage Haththotuwa Weerasumana Weerasinghe (born 17 November 1975) is a Sri Lankan politician, former provincial minister and Member of Parliament.

Weerasinghe was born on 17 November 1975. He was educated at St. Thomas' College, Matara. He is a member of the Communist Party of Sri Lanka.

Weerasinghe was a member of Kotapola Divisional Council and the Southern Provincial Council where he held a provincial ministerial portfolio. He was dismissed from his ministerial position in September 2017 for voting against the proposed 20th amendment to the Constitution of Sri Lanka. He contested the 2020 parliamentary election as a Sri Lanka People's Freedom Alliance electoral alliance candidate in Matara District and was elected to the Parliament of Sri Lanka.

Electoral history of Weerasumana Weerasinghe
Election	Constituency	Party	Alliance	Votes	Result
2004 provincial	Matara District	Communist Party of Sri Lanka	United People's Freedom Alliance	22,095	Elected
2009 provincial	Matara District	Communist Party of Sri Lanka	United People's Freedom Alliance	31,495	Elected
2014 provincial	Matara District	Communist Party of Sri Lanka	United People's Freedom Alliance	29,326	Elected
2020 parliamentary	Matara District	Communist Party of Sri Lanka	Sri Lanka People's Freedom Alliance	77,968	Elected
