= Devinuwara Polling Division =

Devinuwara
- Polling Division
- Coordinates: 5.968309°N 80.636001°E
- Country: Sri Lanka
- Province: Southern Province, Sri Lanka
- Electoral District: Matara Electoral District

Area
  - Total: 84.95 km^{2} (32.80 sq mi)

Population (2012)
  - Total: 102,925
  - Density: 1,212/km^{2} (3,140/sq mi)
- ISO 3166 code: EC-08E

The Devinuwara Polling Division is a polling division in the Matara Electoral District, in the Southern Province, Sri Lanka.

== Presidential election results ==
=== Summary ===
The winner of the Devinuwara polling division has matched the final country result 7 out of 8 times.

Year	Devinuwara	Matara Electoral District	MAE %	Sri Lanka	MAE %
2019	SLPP	SLPP	0.08%	SLPP	14.25%
2015	UPFA	UPFA	1.41%	NDF	11.41%
2010	UPFA	UPFA	1.35%	UPFA	8.68%
2005	UPFA	UPFA	1.89%	UPFA	13.38%
1999	PA	PA	2.27%	PA	2.25%
1994	PA	PA	1.68%	PA	4.02%
1988	UNP	SLFP	8.89%	UNP	1.44%
1982	UNP	UNP	2.28%	UNP	2.15%
Matches/Mean MAE	7/8	6/8	2.48%	8/8	7.20%

=== 2019 Sri Lankan Presidential Election ===
Party	Devinuwara		Matara Electoral District		Sri Lanka	
Party	Votes	%	Votes	%	Votes	%
SLPP	43,556	67.32%	374,481	67.25%	6,924,255	52.25%
NDF	17,391	26.88%	149,026	26.76%	5,564,239	41.99%
NMPP	2,760	4.27%	23,439	4.21%	418,553	3.16%
Other Parties (with < 1%)	993	1.53%	9,922	1.78%	345,452	2.61%
Valid Votes	64,700	99.45%	556,868	99.33%	13,252,499	98.99%
Rejected Votes	355	0.55%	3,782	0.67%	135,452	1.01%
Total Polled	65,055	83.63%	560,650	85.93%	13,387,951	83.71%
Registered Electors	77,788		652,417		15,992,568	

=== 2015 Sri Lankan Presidential Election ===
Party	Devinuwara		Matara Electoral District		Sri Lanka	
Party	Votes	%	Votes	%	Votes	%
UPFA	35,795	59.32%	297,823	57.81%	5,768,090	47.58%
NDF	24,092	39.93%	212,435	41.24%	6,217,162	51.28%
Other Parties (with < 1%)	452	0.75%	4,892	0.95%	138,200	1.14%
Valid Votes	60,339	99.22%	515,150	99.06%	12,123,452	98.85%
Rejected Votes	473	0.78%	4,891	0.94%	140,925	1.15%
Total Polled	60,812	77.28%	520,041	80.23%	12,264,377	78.69%
Registered Electors	78,690		648,213		15,585,942	

=== 2010 Sri Lankan Presidential Election ===
Party	Devinuwara		Matara Electoral District		Sri Lanka	
Party	Votes	%	Votes	%	Votes	%
UPFA	36,428	67.00%	296,155	65.53%	6,015,934	57.88%
NDF	17,219	31.67%	148,510	32.86%	4,173,185	40.15%
Other Parties (with < 1%)	725	1.33%	7,264	1.61%	204,494	1.97%
Valid Votes	54,372	99.44%	451,929	99.34%	10,393,613	99.03%
Rejected Votes	308	0.56%	3,025	0.66%	101,838	0.97%
Total Polled	54,680	73.30%	454,954	76.51%	10,495,451	66.70%
Registered Electors	74,601		594,628		15,734,587	

=== 2005 Sri Lankan Presidential Election ===
Party	Devinuwara		Matara Electoral District		Sri Lanka	
Party	Votes	%	Votes	%	Votes	%
UPFA	35,319	63.81%	279,411	61.85%	4,887,152	50.29%
UNP	19,288	34.84%	165,837	36.71%	4,706,366	48.43%
Other Parties (with < 1%)	747	1.35%	6,474	1.43%	123,521	1.27%
Valid Votes	55,354	99.26%	451,722	99.11%	9,717,039	98.88%
Rejected Votes	415	0.74%	4,077	0.89%	109,869	1.12%
Total Polled	55,769	76.39%	455,799	78.95%	9,826,908	69.51%
Registered Electors	73,005		577,327		14,136,979	

=== 1999 Sri Lankan Presidential Election ===
Party	Devinuwara		Matara Electoral District		Sri Lanka	
Party	Votes	%	Votes	%	Votes	%
PA	25,363	51.24%	205,685	54.32%	4,312,157	51.12%
UNP	18,844	38.07%	139,677	36.89%	3,602,748	42.71%
JVP	4,539	9.17%	26,229	6.93%	343,927	4.08%
Other Parties (with < 1%)	749	1.51%	7,047	1.86%	176,679	2.09%
Valid Votes	49,495	98.09%	378,638	97.78%	8,435,754	97.69%
Rejected Votes	963	1.91%	8,583	2.22%	199,536	2.31%
Total Polled	50,458	73.88%	387,221	73.90%	8,635,290	72.17%
Registered Electors	68,296		524,002		11,965,536	

=== 1994 Sri Lankan Presidential Election ===
Party	Devinuwara		Matara Electoral District		Sri Lanka	
Party	Votes	%	Votes	%	Votes	%
PA	30,817	66.45%	227,865	64.69%	4,709,205	62.28%
UNP	14,824	31.96%	118,224	33.56%	2,715,283	35.91%
Other Parties (with < 1%)	736	1.59%	6,150	1.75%	137,040	1.81%
Valid Votes	46,377	98.67%	352,239	98.40%	7,561,526	98.03%
Rejected Votes	624	1.33%	5,731	1.60%	151,706	1.97%
Total Polled	47,001	70.23%	357,970	69.93%	7,713,232	69.12%
Registered Electors	66,923		511,933		11,158,880	

=== 1988 Sri Lankan Presidential Election ===
Party	Devinuwara		Matara Electoral District		Sri Lanka	
Party	Votes	%	Votes	%	Votes	%
UNP	5,076	52.51%	45,399	42.93%	2,569,199	50.43%
SLFP	4,403	45.55%	57,424	54.30%	2,289,857	44.95%
SLMP	188	1.94%	2,922	2.76%	235,701	4.63%
Valid Votes	9,667	98.94%	105,745	98.14%	5,094,754	98.24%
Rejected Votes	104	1.06%	2,003	1.86%	91,499	1.76%
Total Polled	9,771	15.64%	107,748	23.80%	5,186,256	55.87%
Registered Electors	62,490		452,637		9,283,143	

=== 1982 Sri Lankan Presidential Election ===
Party	Devinuwara		Matara Electoral District		Sri Lanka	
Party	Votes	%	Votes	%	Votes	%
UNP	22,605	49.59%	164,725	49.32%	3,450,815	52.93%
SLFP	17,757	38.96%	144,587	43.29%	2,546,348	39.05%
JVP	4,874	10.69%	22,117	6.62%	273,428	4.19%
Other Parties (with < 1%)	347	0.76%	2,554	0.76%	249,460	3.83%
Valid Votes	45,583	99.01%	333,983	99.08%	6,520,156	98.78%
Rejected Votes	457	0.99%	3,091	0.92%	80,470	1.22%
Total Polled	46,040	81.21%	337,074	82.90%	6,600,626	80.15%
Registered Electors	56,693		406,595		8,235,358	

== Parliamentary Election Results ==
=== Summary ===
The winner of Devinuwara has matched the final country result 6 out of 7 times. Hence, Devinuwara is a Bellwether for Parliamentary Elections.

Year	Devinuwara	Matara Electoral District	MAE %	Sri Lanka	MAE %
2015	UPFA	UPFA	0.77%	UNP	8.22%
2010	UPFA	UPFA	2.21%	UPFA	5.63%
2004	UPFA	UPFA	1.23%	UPFA	8.90%
2001	UNP	UNP	2.35%	UNP	2.18%
2000	PA	PA	2.78%	PA	3.75%
1994	PA	PA	2.16%	PA	6.26%
1989	UNP	UNP	21.62%	UNP	21.02%
Matches/Mean MAE	6/7	6/7	4.73%	7/7	7.99%

=== 2015 Sri Lankan Parliamentary Election ===
Party	Devinuwara		Matara Electoral District		Sri Lanka	
Party	Votes	%	Votes	%	Votes	%
UPFA	29,565	53.12%	250,505	52.70%	4,732,664	42.48%
UNP	21,187	38.07%	186,675	39.27%	5,098,916	45.77%
JVP	4,711	8.46%	35,270	7.42%	544,154	4.88%
Other Parties (with < 1%)	190	0.34%	2,890	0.61%	62,184	0.56%
Valid Votes	55,653	97.46%	475,340	96.93%	11,140,333	95.35%
Rejected Votes	1,365	2.39%	12,692	2.59%	516,926	4.42%
Total Polled	57,106	72.57%	490,409	78.61%	11,684,111	77.66%
Registered Electors	78,690		623,818		15,044,490	

=== 2010 Sri Lankan Parliamentary Election ===
Party	Devinuwara		Matara Electoral District		Sri Lanka	
Party	Votes	%	Votes	%	Votes	%
UPFA	26,177	67.09%	213,937	65.31%	4,846,388	60.38%
UNP	9,535	24.44%	91,114	27.81%	2,357,057	29.37%
DNA	3,086	7.91%	20,465	6.25%	441,251	5.50%
Other Parties (with < 1%)	221	0.57%	2,066	0.63%	53,531	0.67%
Valid Votes	39,019	96.36%	327,582	95.82%	8,026,322	96.03%
Rejected Votes	1,473	3.64%	14,289	4.18%	581,465	6.96%
Total Polled	40,492	54.28%	341,871	59.06%	8,358,246	59.29%
Registered Electors	74,601		578,858		14,097,690	

=== 2004 Sri Lankan Parliamentary Election ===
Party	Devinuwara		Matara Electoral District		Sri Lanka	
Party	Votes	%	Votes	%	Votes	%
UPFA	30,360	61.34%	241,235	60.27%	4,223,126	45.70%
UNP	16,473	33.28%	139,633	34.89%	3,486,792	37.73%
JHU	2,331	4.71%	16,229	4.05%	552,723	5.98%
Other Parties (with < 1%)	327	0.66%	3,136	0.78%	54,133	0.59%
Valid Votes	49,491	95.44%	400,233	94.62%	9,241,931	94.52%
Rejected Votes	2,365	4.56%	22,769	5.38%	534,452	5.47%
Total Polled	51,856	72.21%	423,002	76.84%	9,777,821	75.74%
Registered Electors	71,812		550,506		12,909,631	

=== 2001 Sri Lankan Parliamentary Election ===
Party	Devinuwara		Matara Electoral District		Sri Lanka	
Party	Votes	%	Votes	%	Votes	%
UNP	22,490	43.57%	171,661	42.49%	4,086,026	45.62%
PA	20,021	38.79%	171,141	42.37%	3,330,815	37.19%
JVP	8,378	16.23%	54,476	13.49%	815,353	9.10%
Other Parties (with < 1%)	724	1.40%	6,689	1.66%	133,373	1.49%
Valid Votes	51,613	96.05%	403,967	95.10%	8,955,844	94.77%
Rejected Votes	2,120	3.95%	20,820	4.90%	494,009	5.23%
Total Polled	53,733	76.31%	424,787	79.44%	9,449,878	76.03%
Registered Electors	70,412		534,694		12,428,762	

=== 2000 Sri Lankan Parliamentary Election ===
Party	Devinuwara		Matara Electoral District		Sri Lanka	
Party	Votes	%	Votes	%	Votes	%
PA	24,263	48.24%	203,690	51.47%	3,899,329	45.33%
UNP	17,826	35.44%	146,855	37.11%	3,451,765	40.12%
JVP	7,489	14.89%	38,757	9.79%	518,725	6.03%
Other Parties (with < 1%)	719	1.43%	6,462	1.63%	238,931	2.78%
Valid Votes	50,297	N/A	395,764	N/A	8,602,617	N/A

=== 1994 Sri Lankan Parliamentary Election ===
Party	Devinuwara		Matara Electoral District		Sri Lanka	
Party	Votes	%	Votes	%	Votes	%
PA	28,191	57.61%	227,285	59.90%	3,887,805	48.94%
UNP	19,335	39.51%	142,024	37.43%	3,498,370	44.04%
SLPF	1,304	2.66%	8,736	2.30%	90,078	1.13%
Other Parties (with < 1%)	105	0.21%	1,422	0.37%	68,538	0.86%
Valid Votes	48,935	96.37%	379,467	95.67%	7,943,688	95.20%
Rejected Votes	1,841	3.63%	17,167	4.33%	400,395	4.80%
Total Polled	50,776	75.87%	396,634	77.60%	8,344,095	74.75%
Registered Electors	66,923		511,109		11,163,064	

=== 1989 Sri Lankan Parliamentary Election ===
Party	Devinuwara		Matara Electoral District		Sri Lanka	
Party	Votes	%	Votes	%	Votes	%
UNP	6,622	82.64%	45,734	56.11%	2,838,005	50.71%
SLFP	1,369	17.08%	28,752	35.28%	1,785,369	31.90%
Other Parties (with < 1%)	22	0.27%	7,019	8.61%	300,186	5.36%
Valid Votes	8,013	98.17%	81,505	94.08%	5,596,468	93.87%
Rejected Votes	149	1.83%	5,128	5.92%	365,563	6.13%
Total Polled	8,162	13.28%	86,633	19.17%	5,962,031	63.60%
Registered Electors	61,452		451,926		9,374,164	

== Demographics ==
=== Ethnicity ===
The Devinuwara Polling Division has a Sinhalese majority (96.5%) . In comparison, the Matara Electoral District (which contains the Devinuwara Polling Division) has a Sinhalese majority (94.3%)

Ethnicity in Devinuwara
1. Sinhalese (96.5%)
2. Moor (3.30%)
3. Other (0.20%)

=== Religion ===
The Devinuwara Polling Division has a Buddhist majority (96.2%) . In comparison, the Matara Electoral District (which contains the Devinuwara Polling Division) has a Buddhist majority (94.1%)

Religion in Devinuwara
1. Buddhist (96.2%)
2. Muslim (3.30%)
3. Other (0.40%)
