= Hakmana Polling Division =

Hakmana
- Polling Division
- Interactive map of Hakmana
- Coordinates: 6.170263°N 80.609763°E
- Country: Sri Lanka
- Province: Southern Province, Sri Lanka
- Electoral District: Matara Electoral District

Area
  - Total: 325.5 km^{2} (125.7 sq mi)

Population (2012)
  - Total: 141,069
  - Density: 433/km^{2} (1,120/sq mi)
- ISO 3166 code: EC-08B

The Hakmana Polling Division is a Polling Division in the Matara Electoral District, in the Southern Province, Sri Lanka.

== Presidential Election Results ==
=== Summary ===
The winner of Hakmana has matched the final country result 5 out of 8 times. Hence, Hakmana is a Weak Bellwether for Presidential Elections.

Year	Hakmana	Matara Electoral District	MAE %	Sri Lanka	MAE %
2019	SLPP	SLPP	3.54%	SLPP	17.69%
2015	UPFA	UPFA	6.40%	NDF	16.43%
2010	UPFA	UPFA	5.18%	UPFA	12.55%
2005	UPFA	UPFA	1.55%	UPFA	13.09%
1999	PA	PA	0.37%	PA	4.57%
1994	PA	PA	2.84%	PA	0.49%
1988	SLFP	SLFP	2.65%	UNP	5.46%
1982	SLFP	UNP	3.63%	UNP	7.20%
Matches/Mean MAE	5/8	6/8	3.27%	8/8	9.68%

=== 2019 Sri Lankan Presidential Election ===
Party	Hakmana		Matara Electoral District		Sri Lanka	
Party	Votes	%	Votes	%	Votes	%
SLPP	55,814	71.13%	374,481	67.25%	6,924,255	52.25%
NDF	18,346	23.38%	149,026	26.76%	5,564,239	41.99%
NMPP	2,750	3.50%	23,439	4.21%	418,553	3.16%
Other Parties (with < 1%)	1,561	1.99%	9,922	1.78%	345,452	2.61%
Valid Votes	78,471	99.47%	556,868	99.33%	13,252,499	98.99%
Rejected Votes	419	0.53%	3,782	0.67%	135,452	1.01%
Total Polled	78,890	86.18%	560,650	85.93%	13,387,951	83.71%
Registered Electors	91,543		652,417		15,992,568	

=== 2015 Sri Lankan Presidential Election ===
Party	Hakmana		Matara Electoral District		Sri Lanka	
Party	Votes	%	Votes	%	Votes	%
UPFA	46,635	64.15%	297,823	57.81%	5,768,090	47.58%
NDF	25,164	34.62%	212,435	41.24%	6,217,162	51.28%
Other Parties (with < 1%)	896	1.23%	4,892	0.95%	138,200	1.14%
Valid Votes	72,695	98.98%	515,150	99.06%	12,123,452	98.85%
Rejected Votes	748	1.02%	4,891	0.94%	140,925	1.15%
Total Polled	73,443	80.01%	520,041	80.23%	12,264,377	78.69%
Registered Electors	91,791		648,213		15,585,942	

=== 2010 Sri Lankan Presidential Election ===
Party	Hakmana		Matara Electoral District		Sri Lanka	
Party	Votes	%	Votes	%	Votes	%
UPFA	45,590	70.66%	296,155	65.53%	6,015,934	57.88%
NDF	17,626	27.32%	148,510	32.86%	4,173,185	40.15%
Other Parties (with < 1%)	1,306	2.02%	7,264	1.61%	204,494	1.97%
Valid Votes	64,522	99.30%	451,929	99.34%	10,393,613	99.03%
Rejected Votes	452	0.70%	3,025	0.66%	101,838	0.97%
Total Polled	64,974	75.83%	454,954	76.51%	10,495,451	66.70%
Registered Electors	85,686		594,628		15,734,587	

=== 2005 Sri Lankan Presidential Election ===
Party	Hakmana		Matara Electoral District		Sri Lanka	
Party	Votes	%	Votes	%	Votes	%
UPFA	40,567	63.27%	279,411	61.85%	4,887,152	50.29%
UNP	22,366	34.88%	165,837	36.71%	4,706,366	48.43%
Other Parties (with < 1%)	1,185	1.85%	6,474	1.43%	123,521	1.27%
Valid Votes	64,118	99.12%	451,722	99.11%	9,717,039	98.88%
Rejected Votes	571	0.88%	4,077	0.89%	109,869	1.12%
Total Polled	64,689	78.77%	455,799	78.95%	9,826,908	69.51%
Registered Electors	82,128		577,327		14,136,979	

=== 1999 Sri Lankan Presidential Election ===
Party	Hakmana		Matara Electoral District		Sri Lanka	
Party	Votes	%	Votes	%	Votes	%
PA	29,115	54.77%	205,685	54.32%	4,312,157	51.12%
UNP	19,464	36.61%	139,677	36.89%	3,602,748	42.71%
JVP	3,471	6.53%	26,229	6.93%	343,927	4.08%
Other Parties (with < 1%)	1,111	2.09%	7,047	1.86%	176,679	2.09%
Valid Votes	53,161	98.18%	378,638	97.78%	8,435,754	97.69%
Rejected Votes	983	1.82%	8,583	2.22%	199,536	2.31%
Total Polled	54,144	72.04%	387,221	73.90%	8,635,290	72.17%
Registered Electors	75,156		524,002		11,965,536	

=== 1994 Sri Lankan Presidential Election ===
Party	Hakmana		Matara Electoral District		Sri Lanka	
Party	Votes	%	Votes	%	Votes	%
PA	29,756	61.68%	227,865	64.69%	4,709,205	62.28%
UNP	17,473	36.22%	118,224	33.56%	2,715,283	35.91%
Other Parties (with < 1%)	1,017	2.11%	6,150	1.75%	137,040	1.81%
Valid Votes	48,246	98.31%	352,239	98.40%	7,561,526	98.03%
Rejected Votes	828	1.69%	5,731	1.60%	151,706	1.97%
Total Polled	49,074	69.23%	357,970	69.93%	7,713,232	69.12%
Registered Electors	70,889		511,933		11,158,880	

=== 1988 Sri Lankan Presidential Election ===
Party	Hakmana		Matara Electoral District		Sri Lanka	
Party	Votes	%	Votes	%	Votes	%
SLFP	1,494	52.20%	57,424	54.30%	2,289,857	44.95%
UNP	1,327	46.37%	45,399	42.93%	2,569,199	50.43%
SLMP	41	1.43%	2,922	2.76%	235,701	4.63%
Valid Votes	2,862	98.25%	105,745	98.14%	5,094,754	98.24%
Rejected Votes	51	1.75%	2,003	1.86%	91,499	1.76%
Total Polled	2,913	4.45%	107,748	23.80%	5,186,256	55.87%
Registered Electors	65,407		452,637		9,283,143	

=== 1982 Sri Lankan Presidential Election ===
Party	Hakmana		Matara Electoral District		Sri Lanka	
Party	Votes	%	Votes	%	Votes	%
SLFP	22,984	47.68%	144,587	43.29%	2,546,348	39.05%
UNP	22,146	45.95%	164,725	49.32%	3,450,815	52.93%
JVP	2,711	5.62%	22,117	6.62%	273,428	4.19%
Other Parties (with < 1%)	360	0.75%	2,554	0.76%	249,460	3.83%
Valid Votes	48,201	99.14%	333,983	99.08%	6,520,156	98.78%
Rejected Votes	420	0.86%	3,091	0.92%	80,470	1.22%
Total Polled	48,621	85.00%	337,074	82.90%	6,600,626	80.15%
Registered Electors	57,203		406,595		8,235,358	

== Parliamentary Election Results ==
=== Summary ===
The winner of Hakmana has matched the final country result 5 out of 7 times. Hence, Hakmana is a Weak Bellwether for Parliamentary Elections.

Year	Hakmana	Matara Electoral District	MAE %	Sri Lanka	MAE %
2015	UPFA	UPFA	6.79%	UNP	13.70%
2010	UPFA	UPFA	6.57%	UPFA	9.68%
2004	UPFA	UPFA	1.72%	UPFA	9.29%
2001	PA	UNP	1.02%	UNP	4.53%
2000	PA	PA	0.95%	PA	3.37%
1994	PA	PA	1.44%	PA	6.89%
1989	UNP	UNP	7.25%	UNP	2.49%
Matches/Mean MAE	5/7	6/7	3.67%	7/7	7.14%

=== 2015 Sri Lankan Parliamentary Election ===
Party	Hakmana		Matara Electoral District		Sri Lanka	
Party	Votes	%	Votes	%	Votes	%
UPFA	40,128	60.34%	250,505	52.70%	4,732,664	42.48%
UNP	21,637	32.54%	186,675	39.27%	5,098,916	45.77%
JVP	3,936	5.92%	35,270	7.42%	544,154	4.88%
Other Parties (with < 1%)	798	1.20%	2,890	0.61%	62,184	0.56%
Valid Votes	66,499	96.73%	475,340	96.93%	11,140,333	95.35%
Rejected Votes	2,205	3.21%	12,692	2.59%	516,926	4.42%
Total Polled	68,745	74.89%	490,409	78.61%	11,684,111	77.66%
Registered Electors	91,791		623,818		15,044,490	

=== 2010 Sri Lankan Parliamentary Election ===
Party	Hakmana		Matara Electoral District		Sri Lanka	
Party	Votes	%	Votes	%	Votes	%
UPFA	33,113	72.72%	213,937	65.31%	4,846,388	60.38%
UNP	9,971	21.90%	91,114	27.81%	2,357,057	29.37%
DNA	2,212	4.86%	20,465	6.25%	441,251	5.50%
Other Parties (with < 1%)	239	0.52%	2,066	0.63%	53,531	0.67%
Valid Votes	45,535	94.65%	327,582	95.82%	8,026,322	96.03%
Rejected Votes	2,572	5.35%	14,289	4.18%	581,465	6.96%
Total Polled	48,107	56.14%	341,871	59.06%	8,358,246	59.29%
Registered Electors	85,686		578,858		14,097,690	

=== 2004 Sri Lankan Parliamentary Election ===
Party	Hakmana		Matara Electoral District		Sri Lanka	
Party	Votes	%	Votes	%	Votes	%
UPFA	34,158	62.52%	241,235	60.27%	4,223,126	45.70%
UNP	18,582	34.01%	139,633	34.89%	3,486,792	37.73%
JHU	1,421	2.60%	16,229	4.05%	552,723	5.98%
Other Parties (with < 1%)	472	0.86%	3,136	0.78%	54,133	0.59%
Valid Votes	54,633	93.42%	400,233	94.62%	9,241,931	94.52%
Rejected Votes	3,846	6.58%	22,769	5.38%	534,452	5.47%
Total Polled	58,479	73.17%	423,002	76.84%	9,777,821	75.74%
Registered Electors	79,918		550,506		12,909,631	

=== 2001 Sri Lankan Parliamentary Election ===
Party	Hakmana		Matara Electoral District		Sri Lanka	
Party	Votes	%	Votes	%	Votes	%
PA	24,577	43.77%	171,141	42.37%	3,330,815	37.19%
UNP	23,457	41.77%	171,661	42.49%	4,086,026	45.62%
JVP	7,094	12.63%	54,476	13.49%	815,353	9.10%
Other Parties (with < 1%)	1,027	1.83%	6,689	1.66%	133,373	1.49%
Valid Votes	56,155	93.54%	403,967	95.10%	8,955,844	94.77%
Rejected Votes	3,878	6.46%	20,820	4.90%	494,009	5.23%
Total Polled	60,033	77.04%	424,787	79.44%	9,449,878	76.03%
Registered Electors	77,929		534,694		12,428,762	

=== 2000 Sri Lankan Parliamentary Election ===
Party	Hakmana		Matara Electoral District		Sri Lanka	
Party	Votes	%	Votes	%	Votes	%
PA	28,636	51.54%	203,690	51.47%	3,899,329	45.33%
UNP	21,728	39.11%	146,855	37.11%	3,451,765	40.12%
JVP	4,522	8.14%	38,757	9.79%	518,725	6.03%
Other Parties (with < 1%)	674	1.21%	6,462	1.63%	238,931	2.78%
Valid Votes	55,560	N/A	395,764	N/A	8,602,617	N/A

=== 1994 Sri Lankan Parliamentary Election ===
Party	Hakmana		Matara Electoral District		Sri Lanka	
Party	Votes	%	Votes	%	Votes	%
PA	30,834	58.60%	227,285	59.90%	3,887,805	48.94%
UNP	20,608	39.17%	142,024	37.43%	3,498,370	44.04%
SLPF	991	1.88%	8,736	2.30%	90,078	1.13%
Other Parties (with < 1%)	181	0.34%	1,422	0.37%	68,538	0.86%
Valid Votes	52,614	94.67%	379,467	95.67%	7,943,688	95.20%
Rejected Votes	2,965	5.33%	17,167	4.33%	400,395	4.80%
Total Polled	55,579	78.40%	396,634	77.60%	8,344,095	74.75%
Registered Electors	70,889		511,109		11,163,064	

=== 1989 Sri Lankan Parliamentary Election ===
Party	Hakmana		Matara Electoral District		Sri Lanka	
Party	Votes	%	Votes	%	Votes	%
UNP	218	46.48%	45,734	56.11%	2,838,005	50.71%
SLFP	149	31.77%	28,752	35.28%	1,785,369	31.90%
ELJP	97	20.68%	1,481	1.82%	67,723	1.21%
Other Parties (with < 1%)	5	1.07%	5,538	6.79%	232,463	4.15%
Valid Votes	469	91.60%	81,505	94.08%	5,596,468	93.87%
Rejected Votes	43	8.40%	5,128	5.92%	365,563	6.13%
Total Polled	512	0.79%	86,633	19.17%	5,962,031	63.60%
Registered Electors	64,833		451,926		9,374,164	

== Demographics ==
=== Ethnicity ===
The Hakmana Polling Division has a Sinhalese majority (97.9%) . In comparison, the Matara Electoral District (which contains the Hakmana Polling Division) has a Sinhalese majority (94.3%)

Ethnicity in Hakmana
1. Sinhalese (97.9%)
2. Other (2.10%)

=== Religion ===
The Hakmana Polling Division has a Buddhist majority (97.9%) . In comparison, the Matara Electoral District (which contains the Hakmana Polling Division) has a Buddhist majority (94.1%)

Religion in Hakmana
1. Buddhist (97.9%)
2. Hindu (1.10%)
3. Other (1.00%)
