= Akuressa Polling Division =

Akuressa
- Polling Division
- Coordinates: 6.082773°N 80.480722°E
- Country: Sri Lanka
- Province: Southern Province, Sri Lanka
- Electoral District: Matara Electoral District

Area
  - Total: 256.55 km^{2} (99.05 sq mi)

Population (2012)
  - Total: 120,072
  - Density: 468/km^{2} (1,210/sq mi)
- ISO 3166 code: EC-08C

The Akuressa Polling Division is a Polling Division in the Matara Electoral District, in the Southern Province, Sri Lanka.

== Presidential Election Results ==
=== Summary ===
The winner of Akuressa has matched the final country result 7 out of 8 times. Hence, Akuressa is a Strong Bellwether for Presidential Elections.

Year	Akuressa	Matara Electoral District	MAE %	Sri Lanka	MAE %
2019	SLPP	SLPP	0.32%	SLPP	14.05%
2015	UPFA	UPFA	0.07%	NDF	9.96%
2010	UPFA	UPFA	0.40%	UPFA	7.75%
2005	UPFA	UPFA	0.69%	UPFA	10.82%
1999	PA	PA	1.03%	PA	3.27%
1994	PA	PA	1.52%	PA	0.83%
1988	UNP	SLFP	15.35%	UNP	7.06%
1982	UNP	UNP	1.49%	UNP	2.92%
Matches/Mean MAE	7/8	6/8	2.61%	8/8	7.08%

=== 2019 Sri Lankan Presidential Election ===
Party	Akuressa		Matara Electoral District		Sri Lanka	
Party	Votes	%	Votes	%	Votes	%
SLPP	53,478	66.81%	374,481	67.25%	6,924,255	52.25%
NDF	21,415	26.75%	149,026	26.76%	5,564,239	41.99%
NMPP	3,787	4.73%	23,439	4.21%	418,553	3.16%
Other Parties (with < 1%)	1,369	1.71%	9,922	1.78%	345,452	2.61%
Valid Votes	80,049	99.38%	556,868	99.33%	13,252,499	98.99%
Rejected Votes	499	0.62%	3,782	0.67%	135,452	1.01%
Total Polled	80,548	86.04%	560,650	85.93%	13,387,951	83.71%
Registered Electors	93,616		652,417		15,992,568	

=== 2015 Sri Lankan Presidential Election ===
Party	Akuressa		Matara Electoral District		Sri Lanka	
Party	Votes	%	Votes	%	Votes	%
UPFA	42,860	57.70%	297,823	57.81%	5,768,090	47.58%
NDF	30,647	41.26%	212,435	41.24%	6,217,162	51.28%
Other Parties (with < 1%)	778	1.05%	4,892	0.95%	138,200	1.14%
Valid Votes	74,285	99.23%	515,150	99.06%	12,123,452	98.85%
Rejected Votes	575	0.77%	4,891	0.94%	140,925	1.15%
Total Polled	74,860	79.83%	520,041	80.23%	12,264,377	78.69%
Registered Electors	93,769		648,213		15,585,942	

=== 2010 Sri Lankan Presidential Election ===
Party	Akuressa		Matara Electoral District		Sri Lanka	
Party	Votes	%	Votes	%	Votes	%
UPFA	44,527	65.95%	296,155	65.53%	6,015,934	57.88%
NDF	21,926	32.47%	148,510	32.86%	4,173,185	40.15%
Other Parties (with < 1%)	1,066	1.58%	7,264	1.61%	204,494	1.97%
Valid Votes	67,519	99.34%	451,929	99.34%	10,393,613	99.03%
Rejected Votes	449	0.66%	3,025	0.66%	101,838	0.97%
Total Polled	67,968	77.67%	454,954	76.51%	10,495,451	66.70%
Registered Electors	87,510		594,628		15,734,587	

=== 2005 Sri Lankan Presidential Election ===
Party	Akuressa		Matara Electoral District		Sri Lanka	
Party	Votes	%	Votes	%	Votes	%
UPFA	41,091	61.11%	279,411	61.85%	4,887,152	50.29%
UNP	25,103	37.33%	165,837	36.71%	4,706,366	48.43%
Other Parties (with < 1%)	1,052	1.56%	6,474	1.43%	123,521	1.27%
Valid Votes	67,246	99.16%	451,722	99.11%	9,717,039	98.88%
Rejected Votes	570	0.84%	4,077	0.89%	109,869	1.12%
Total Polled	67,816	79.91%	455,799	78.95%	9,826,908	69.51%
Registered Electors	84,867		577,327		14,136,979	

=== 1999 Sri Lankan Presidential Election ===
Party	Akuressa		Matara Electoral District		Sri Lanka	
Party	Votes	%	Votes	%	Votes	%
PA	30,040	53.00%	205,685	54.32%	4,312,157	51.12%
UNP	21,330	37.63%	139,677	36.89%	3,602,748	42.71%
JVP	4,231	7.46%	26,229	6.93%	343,927	4.08%
Other Parties (with < 1%)	1,079	1.90%	7,047	1.86%	176,679	2.09%
Valid Votes	56,680	98.11%	378,638	97.78%	8,435,754	97.69%
Rejected Votes	1,090	1.89%	8,583	2.22%	199,536	2.31%
Total Polled	57,770	75.11%	387,221	73.90%	8,635,290	72.17%
Registered Electors	76,916		524,002		11,965,536	

=== 1994 Sri Lankan Presidential Election ===
Party	Akuressa		Matara Electoral District		Sri Lanka	
Party	Votes	%	Votes	%	Votes	%
PA	32,632	63.17%	227,865	64.69%	4,709,205	62.28%
UNP	18,165	35.17%	118,224	33.56%	2,715,283	35.91%
Other Parties (with < 1%)	858	1.66%	6,150	1.75%	137,040	1.81%
Valid Votes	51,655	98.28%	352,239	98.40%	7,561,526	98.03%
Rejected Votes	903	1.72%	5,731	1.60%	151,706	1.97%
Total Polled	52,558	70.49%	357,970	69.93%	7,713,232	69.12%
Registered Electors	74,562		511,933		11,158,880	

=== 1988 Sri Lankan Presidential Election ===
Party	Akuressa		Matara Electoral District		Sri Lanka	
Party	Votes	%	Votes	%	Votes	%
UNP	5,346	58.34%	45,399	42.93%	2,569,199	50.43%
SLFP	3,505	38.25%	57,424	54.30%	2,289,857	44.95%
SLMP	312	3.40%	2,922	2.76%	235,701	4.63%
Valid Votes	9,163	97.07%	105,745	98.14%	5,094,754	98.24%
Rejected Votes	277	2.93%	2,003	1.86%	91,499	1.76%
Total Polled	9,440	14.07%	107,748	23.80%	5,186,256	55.87%
Registered Electors	67,076		452,637		9,283,143	

=== 1982 Sri Lankan Presidential Election ===
Party	Akuressa		Matara Electoral District		Sri Lanka	
Party	Votes	%	Votes	%	Votes	%
UNP	24,667	49.08%	164,725	49.32%	3,450,815	52.93%
SLFP	20,389	40.57%	144,587	43.29%	2,546,348	39.05%
JVP	4,781	9.51%	22,117	6.62%	273,428	4.19%
Other Parties (with < 1%)	424	0.84%	2,554	0.76%	249,460	3.83%
Valid Votes	50,261	99.17%	333,983	99.08%	6,520,156	98.78%
Rejected Votes	421	0.83%	3,091	0.92%	80,470	1.22%
Total Polled	50,682	84.76%	337,074	82.90%	6,600,626	80.15%
Registered Electors	59,798		406,595		8,235,358	

== Parliamentary Election Results ==
=== Summary ===
The winner of Akuressa has matched the final country result 6 out of 7 times. Hence, Akuressa is a Strong Bellwether for Parliamentary Elections.

Year	Akuressa	Matara Electoral District	MAE %	Sri Lanka	MAE %
2015	UPFA	UPFA	0.66%	UNP	8.10%
2010	UPFA	UPFA	0.22%	UPFA	3.30%
2004	UPFA	UPFA	0.44%	UPFA	7.52%
2001	UNP	UNP	0.81%	UNP	3.95%
2000	PA	PA	0.37%	PA	4.60%
1994	PA	PA	1.69%	PA	6.73%
1989	UNP	UNP	3.40%	UNP	4.85%
Matches/Mean MAE	6/7	6/7	1.09%	7/7	5.58%

=== 2015 Sri Lankan Parliamentary Election ===
Party	Akuressa		Matara Electoral District		Sri Lanka	
Party	Votes	%	Votes	%	Votes	%
UPFA	35,582	53.14%	250,505	52.70%	4,732,664	42.48%
UNP	25,643	38.30%	186,675	39.27%	5,098,916	45.77%
JVP	5,358	8.00%	35,270	7.42%	544,154	4.88%
Other Parties (with < 1%)	370	0.55%	2,890	0.61%	62,184	0.56%
Valid Votes	66,953	95.01%	475,340	96.93%	11,140,333	95.35%
Rejected Votes	1,796	2.55%	12,692	2.59%	516,926	4.42%
Total Polled	70,466	75.15%	490,409	78.61%	11,684,111	77.66%
Registered Electors	93,769		623,818		15,044,490	

=== 2010 Sri Lankan Parliamentary Election ===
Party	Akuressa		Matara Electoral District		Sri Lanka	
Party	Votes	%	Votes	%	Votes	%
UPFA	30,816	65.00%	213,937	65.31%	4,846,388	60.38%
UNP	13,196	27.84%	91,114	27.81%	2,357,057	29.37%
DNA	3,075	6.49%	20,465	6.25%	441,251	5.50%
Other Parties (with < 1%)	320	0.68%	2,066	0.63%	53,531	0.67%
Valid Votes	47,407	95.62%	327,582	95.82%	8,026,322	96.03%
Rejected Votes	2,170	4.38%	14,289	4.18%	581,465	6.96%
Total Polled	49,577	56.65%	341,871	59.06%	8,358,246	59.29%
Registered Electors	87,510		578,858		14,097,690	

=== 2004 Sri Lankan Parliamentary Election ===
Party	Akuressa		Matara Electoral District		Sri Lanka	
Party	Votes	%	Votes	%	Votes	%
UPFA	35,747	60.30%	241,235	60.27%	4,223,126	45.70%
UNP	21,318	35.96%	139,633	34.89%	3,486,792	37.73%
JHU	1,733	2.92%	16,229	4.05%	552,723	5.98%
Other Parties (with < 1%)	484	0.82%	3,136	0.78%	54,133	0.59%
Valid Votes	59,282	94.54%	400,233	94.62%	9,241,931	94.52%
Rejected Votes	3,427	5.46%	22,769	5.38%	534,452	5.47%
Total Polled	62,709	76.17%	423,002	76.84%	9,777,821	75.74%
Registered Electors	82,330		550,506		12,909,631	

=== 2001 Sri Lankan Parliamentary Election ===
Party	Akuressa		Matara Electoral District		Sri Lanka	
Party	Votes	%	Votes	%	Votes	%
UNP	25,372	41.78%	171,661	42.49%	4,086,026	45.62%
PA	25,294	41.65%	171,141	42.37%	3,330,815	37.19%
JVP	9,120	15.02%	54,476	13.49%	815,353	9.10%
Other Parties (with < 1%)	941	1.55%	6,689	1.66%	133,373	1.49%
Valid Votes	60,727	95.04%	403,967	95.10%	8,955,844	94.77%
Rejected Votes	3,172	4.96%	20,820	4.90%	494,009	5.23%
Total Polled	63,899	80.02%	424,787	79.44%	9,449,878	76.03%
Registered Electors	79,850		534,694		12,428,762	

=== 2000 Sri Lankan Parliamentary Election ===
Party	Akuressa		Matara Electoral District		Sri Lanka	
Party	Votes	%	Votes	%	Votes	%
PA	30,699	51.80%	203,690	51.47%	3,899,329	45.33%
UNP	21,688	36.60%	146,855	37.11%	3,451,765	40.12%
JVP	5,879	9.92%	38,757	9.79%	518,725	6.03%
Other Parties (with < 1%)	995	1.68%	6,462	1.63%	238,931	2.78%
Valid Votes	59,261	N/A	395,764	N/A	8,602,617	N/A

=== 1994 Sri Lankan Parliamentary Election ===
Party	Akuressa		Matara Electoral District		Sri Lanka	
Party	Votes	%	Votes	%	Votes	%
PA	32,837	57.98%	227,285	59.90%	3,887,805	48.94%
UNP	21,999	38.84%	142,024	37.43%	3,498,370	44.04%
SLPF	1,554	2.74%	8,736	2.30%	90,078	1.13%
Other Parties (with < 1%)	247	0.44%	1,422	0.37%	68,538	0.86%
Valid Votes	56,637	95.49%	379,467	95.67%	7,943,688	95.20%
Rejected Votes	2,674	4.51%	17,167	4.33%	400,395	4.80%
Total Polled	59,311	79.55%	396,634	77.60%	8,344,095	74.75%
Registered Electors	74,562		511,109		11,163,064	

=== 1989 Sri Lankan Parliamentary Election ===
Party	Akuressa		Matara Electoral District		Sri Lanka	
Party	Votes	%	Votes	%	Votes	%
UNP	5,454	60.06%	45,734	56.11%	2,838,005	50.71%
SLFP	2,902	31.96%	28,752	35.28%	1,785,369	31.90%
USA	481	5.30%	4,225	5.18%	141,983	2.54%
ELJP	162	1.78%	1,481	1.82%	67,723	1.21%
Other Parties (with < 1%)	82	0.90%	1,313	1.61%	90,480	1.62%
Valid Votes	9,081	91.57%	81,505	94.08%	5,596,468	93.87%
Rejected Votes	836	8.43%	5,128	5.92%	365,563	6.13%
Total Polled	9,917	14.96%	86,633	19.17%	5,962,031	63.60%
Registered Electors	66,310		451,926		9,374,164	

== Demographics ==
=== Ethnicity ===
The Akuressa Polling Division has a Sinhalese majority (96.3%) . In comparison, the Matara Electoral District (which contains the Akuressa Polling Division) has a Sinhalese majority (94.3%)

Ethnicity in Akuressa
1. Sinhalese (96.3%)
2. Other (1.90%)
3. Moor (1.80%)

=== Religion ===
The Akuressa Polling Division has a Buddhist majority (96.3%) . In comparison, the Matara Electoral District (which contains the Akuressa Polling Division) has a Buddhist majority (94.1%)

Religion in Akuressa
1. Buddhist (96.3%)
2. Muslim (1.90%)
3. Hindu (1.40%)
4. Other (0.50%)
