= Matara Polling Division =

Matara
- Polling Division
- Coordinates: 5.962655°N 80.567989°E
- Country: Sri Lanka
- Province: Southern Province, Sri Lanka
- Electoral District: Matara Electoral District

Area
  - Total: 56.48 km^{2} (21.81 sq mi)

Population (2012)
  - Total: 115,805
  - Density: 2,050/km^{2} (5,300/sq mi)
- ISO 3166 code: EC-08F

The Matara Polling Division is a Polling Division in the Matara Electoral District, in the Southern Province, Sri Lanka.

== Presidential Election Results ==
=== Summary ===
In presidential elections listed below, the winning candidate in the Matara Polling Division matched the national winning candidate in 7 of 8 elections.

Year	Matara	Matara Electoral District	MAE %	Sri Lanka	MAE %
2019	SLPP	SLPP	3.16%	SLPP	11.35%
2015	NDF	UPFA	8.93%	NDF	1.07%
2010	UPFA	UPFA	10.50%	UPFA	3.16%
2005	UPFA	UPFA	0.36%	UPFA	11.07%
1999	PA	PA	1.08%	PA	5.25%
1994	PA	PA	1.63%	PA	3.96%
1988	SLFP	SLFP	4.21%	UNP	12.21%
1982	UNP	UNP	1.42%	UNP	2.29%
Matches/Mean MAE	7/8	6/8	3.91%	8/8	6.30%

=== 2019 Sri Lankan Presidential Election ===
Party	Matara		Matara Electoral District		Sri Lanka	
Party	Votes	%	Votes	%	Votes	%
SLPP	47,203	63.66%	374,481	67.25%	6,924,255	52.25%
NDF	21,747	29.33%	149,026	26.76%	5,564,239	41.99%
NMPP	4,084	5.51%	23,439	4.21%	418,553	3.16%
Other Parties (with < 1%)	1,116	1.51%	9,922	1.78%	345,452	2.61%
Valid Votes	74,150	99.25%	556,868	99.33%	13,252,499	98.99%
Rejected Votes	563	0.75%	3,782	0.67%	135,452	1.01%
Total Polled	74,713	85.80%	560,650	85.93%	13,387,951	83.71%
Registered Electors	87,076		652,417		15,992,568	

=== 2015 Sri Lankan Presidential Election ===
Party	Matara		Matara Electoral District		Sri Lanka	
Party	Votes	%	Votes	%	Votes	%
NDF	35,248	50.47%	212,435	41.24%	6,217,162	51.28%
UPFA	34,191	48.96%	297,823	57.81%	5,768,090	47.58%
Other Parties (with < 1%)	397	0.57%	4,892	0.95%	138,200	1.14%
Valid Votes	69,836	99.08%	515,150	99.06%	12,123,452	98.85%
Rejected Votes	652	0.92%	4,891	0.94%	140,925	1.15%
Total Polled	70,488	81.04%	520,041	80.23%	12,264,377	78.69%
Registered Electors	86,984		648,213		15,585,942	

=== 2010 Sri Lankan Presidential Election ===
Party	Matara		Matara Electoral District		Sri Lanka	
Party	Votes	%	Votes	%	Votes	%
UPFA	33,948	55.07%	296,155	65.53%	6,015,934	57.88%
NDF	27,102	43.97%	148,510	32.86%	4,173,185	40.15%
Other Parties (with < 1%)	592	0.96%	7,264	1.61%	204,494	1.97%
Valid Votes	61,642	99.41%	451,929	99.34%	10,393,613	99.03%
Rejected Votes	367	0.59%	3,025	0.66%	101,838	0.97%
Total Polled	62,009	77.19%	454,954	76.51%	10,495,451	66.70%
Registered Electors	80,334		594,628		15,734,587	

=== 2005 Sri Lankan Presidential Election ===
Party	Matara		Matara Electoral District		Sri Lanka	
Party	Votes	%	Votes	%	Votes	%
UPFA	37,829	61.69%	279,411	61.85%	4,887,152	50.29%
UNP	22,941	37.41%	165,837	36.71%	4,706,366	48.43%
Other Parties (with < 1%)	552	0.90%	6,474	1.43%	123,521	1.27%
Valid Votes	61,322	99.22%	451,722	99.11%	9,717,039	98.88%
Rejected Votes	483	0.78%	4,077	0.89%	109,869	1.12%
Total Polled	61,805	77.47%	455,799	78.95%	9,826,908	69.51%
Registered Electors	79,784		577,327		14,136,979	

=== 1999 Sri Lankan Presidential Election ===
Party	Matara		Matara Electoral District		Sri Lanka	
Party	Votes	%	Votes	%	Votes	%
PA	28,865	55.79%	205,685	54.32%	4,312,157	51.12%
UNP	18,743	36.22%	139,677	36.89%	3,602,748	42.71%
JVP	3,273	6.33%	26,229	6.93%	343,927	4.08%
Other Parties (with < 1%)	862	1.67%	7,047	1.86%	176,679	2.09%
Valid Votes	51,743	96.66%	378,638	97.78%	8,435,754	97.69%
Rejected Votes	1,790	3.34%	8,583	2.22%	199,536	2.31%
Total Polled	53,533	73.74%	387,221	73.90%	8,635,290	72.17%
Registered Electors	72,593		524,002		11,965,536	

=== 1994 Sri Lankan Presidential Election ===
Party	Matara		Matara Electoral District		Sri Lanka	
Party	Votes	%	Votes	%	Votes	%
PA	32,503	66.51%	227,865	64.69%	4,709,205	62.28%
UNP	15,751	32.23%	118,224	33.56%	2,715,283	35.91%
Other Parties (with < 1%)	618	1.26%	6,150	1.75%	137,040	1.81%
Valid Votes	48,872	98.69%	352,239	98.40%	7,561,526	98.03%
Rejected Votes	648	1.31%	5,731	1.60%	151,706	1.97%
Total Polled	49,520	67.41%	357,970	69.93%	7,713,232	69.12%
Registered Electors	73,461		511,933		11,158,880	

=== 1988 Sri Lankan Presidential Election ===
Party	Matara		Matara Electoral District		Sri Lanka	
Party	Votes	%	Votes	%	Votes	%
SLFP	17,718	58.24%	57,424	54.30%	2,289,857	44.95%
UNP	11,606	38.15%	45,399	42.93%	2,569,199	50.43%
SLMP	1,098	3.61%	2,922	2.76%	235,701	4.63%
Valid Votes	30,422	98.39%	105,745	98.14%	5,094,754	98.24%
Rejected Votes	497	1.61%	2,003	1.86%	91,499	1.76%
Total Polled	30,919	47.98%	107,748	23.80%	5,186,256	55.87%
Registered Electors	64,438		452,637		9,283,143	

=== 1982 Sri Lankan Presidential Election ===
Party	Matara		Matara Electoral District		Sri Lanka	
Party	Votes	%	Votes	%	Votes	%
UNP	23,221	51.76%	164,725	49.32%	3,450,815	52.93%
SLFP	19,333	43.09%	144,587	43.29%	2,546,348	39.05%
JVP	2,067	4.61%	22,117	6.62%	273,428	4.19%
Other Parties (with < 1%)	245	0.55%	2,554	0.76%	249,460	3.83%
Valid Votes	44,866	99.10%	333,983	99.08%	6,520,156	98.78%
Rejected Votes	408	0.90%	3,091	0.92%	80,470	1.22%
Total Polled	45,274	80.48%	337,074	82.90%	6,600,626	80.15%
Registered Electors	56,252		406,595		8,235,358	

== Parliamentary Election Results ==
=== Summary ===
Year	Matara	Matara Electoral District	MAE %	Sri Lanka	MAE %
2015	UNP	UPFA	8.13%	UNP	1.23%
2010	UPFA	UPFA	13.41%	UPFA	9.50%
2004	UPFA	UPFA	1.95%	UPFA	6.98%
2001	PA	UNP	0.83%	UNP	3.68%
2000	PA	PA	0.90%	PA	5.06%
1994	PA	PA	1.63%	PA	9.86%
1989	UNP	UNP	2.25%	UNP	2.20%
Matches/Mean MAE	6/7	6/7	4.16%	7/7	5.50%

=== 2015 Sri Lankan Parliamentary Election ===
Party	Matara		Matara Electoral District		Sri Lanka	
Party	Votes	%	Votes	%	Votes	%
UNP	30,832	47.17%	186,675	39.27%	5,098,916	45.77%
UPFA	28,364	43.39%	250,505	52.70%	4,732,664	42.48%
JVP	5,910	9.04%	35,270	7.42%	544,154	4.88%
Other Parties (with < 1%)	259	0.40%	2,890	0.61%	62,184	0.56%
Valid Votes	65,365	97.97%	475,340	96.93%	11,140,333	95.35%
Rejected Votes	1,240	1.86%	12,692	2.59%	516,926	4.42%
Total Polled	66,716	76.70%	490,409	78.61%	11,684,111	77.66%
Registered Electors	86,984		623,818		15,044,490	

=== 2010 Sri Lankan Parliamentary Election ===
Party	Matara		Matara Electoral District		Sri Lanka	
Party	Votes	%	Votes	%	Votes	%
UPFA	24,353	50.66%	213,937	65.31%	4,846,388	60.38%
UNP	19,875	41.34%	91,114	27.81%	2,357,057	29.37%
DNA	3,624	7.54%	20,465	6.25%	441,251	5.50%
Other Parties (with < 1%)	222	0.46%	2,066	0.63%	53,531	0.67%
Valid Votes	48,074	97.37%	327,582	95.82%	8,026,322	96.03%
Rejected Votes	1,299	2.63%	14,289	4.18%	581,465	6.96%
Total Polled	49,373	61.46%	341,871	59.06%	8,358,246	59.29%
Registered Electors	80,334		578,858		14,097,690	

=== 2004 Sri Lankan Parliamentary Election ===
Party	Matara		Matara Electoral District		Sri Lanka	
Party	Votes	%	Votes	%	Votes	%
UPFA	32,967	57.74%	241,235	60.27%	4,223,126	45.70%
UNP	19,458	34.08%	139,633	34.89%	3,486,792	37.73%
JHU	4,309	7.55%	16,229	4.05%	552,723	5.98%
Other Parties (with < 1%)	357	0.63%	3,136	0.78%	54,133	0.59%
Valid Votes	57,091	96.62%	400,233	94.62%	9,241,931	94.52%
Rejected Votes	1,999	3.38%	22,769	5.38%	534,452	5.47%
Total Polled	59,090	75.31%	423,002	76.84%	9,777,821	75.74%
Registered Electors	78,465		550,506		12,909,631	

=== 2001 Sri Lankan Parliamentary Election ===
Party	Matara		Matara Electoral District		Sri Lanka	
Party	Votes	%	Votes	%	Votes	%
PA	24,480	43.25%	171,141	42.37%	3,330,815	37.19%
UNP	24,376	43.06%	171,661	42.49%	4,086,026	45.62%
JVP	6,763	11.95%	54,476	13.49%	815,353	9.10%
Other Parties (with < 1%)	987	1.74%	6,689	1.66%	133,373	1.49%
Valid Votes	56,606	96.62%	403,967	95.10%	8,955,844	94.77%
Rejected Votes	1,983	3.38%	20,820	4.90%	494,009	5.23%
Total Polled	58,589	77.81%	424,787	79.44%	9,449,878	76.03%
Registered Electors	75,301		534,694		12,428,762	

=== 2000 Sri Lankan Parliamentary Election ===
Party	Matara		Matara Electoral District		Sri Lanka	
Party	Votes	%	Votes	%	Votes	%
PA	28,736	52.20%	203,690	51.47%	3,899,329	45.33%
UNP	19,706	35.79%	146,855	37.11%	3,451,765	40.12%
JVP	5,200	9.45%	38,757	9.79%	518,725	6.03%
SU	1,024	1.86%	3,375	0.85%	127,859	1.49%
Other Parties (with < 1%)	388	0.70%	3,087	0.78%	111,072	1.29%
Valid Votes	55,054	N/A	395,764	N/A	8,602,617	N/A

=== 1994 Sri Lankan Parliamentary Election ===
Party	Matara		Matara Electoral District		Sri Lanka	
Party	Votes	%	Votes	%	Votes	%
PA	32,629	61.50%	227,285	59.90%	3,887,805	48.94%
UNP	18,915	35.65%	142,024	37.43%	3,498,370	44.04%
SLPF	1,264	2.38%	8,736	2.30%	90,078	1.13%
Other Parties (with < 1%)	246	0.46%	1,422	0.37%	68,538	0.86%
Valid Votes	53,054	97.02%	379,467	95.67%	7,943,688	95.20%
Rejected Votes	1,632	2.98%	17,167	4.33%	400,395	4.80%
Total Polled	54,686	74.44%	396,634	77.60%	8,344,095	74.75%
Registered Electors	73,461		511,109		11,163,064	

=== 1989 Sri Lankan Parliamentary Election ===
Party	Matara		Matara Electoral District		Sri Lanka	
Party	Votes	%	Votes	%	Votes	%
UNP	16,505	52.53%	45,734	56.11%	2,838,005	50.71%
SLFP	11,094	35.31%	28,752	35.28%	1,785,369	31.90%
USA	2,879	9.16%	4,225	5.18%	141,983	2.54%
ELJP	705	2.24%	1,481	1.82%	67,723	1.21%
Other Parties (with < 1%)	240	0.76%	1,313	1.61%	90,480	1.62%
Valid Votes	31,423	94.48%	81,505	94.08%	5,596,468	93.87%
Rejected Votes	1,835	5.52%	5,128	5.92%	365,563	6.13%
Total Polled	33,258	53.12%	86,633	19.17%	5,962,031	63.60%
Registered Electors	62,612		451,926		9,374,164	

== Demographics ==
=== Ethnicity ===
The Matara Polling Division has a Sinhalese majority (95.9%) . In comparison, the Matara Electoral District (which contains the Matara Polling Division) has a Sinhalese majority (94.3%)

Ethnicity in Matara
1. Sinhalese (95.9%)
2. Moor (3.70%)
3. Other (0.40%)

=== Religion ===
The Matara Polling Division has a Buddhist majority (95.3%) . In comparison, the Matara Electoral District (which contains the Matara Polling Division) has a Buddhist majority (94.1%)

Religion in Matara
1. Buddhist (95.3%)
2. Muslim (3.80%)
3. Other (0.90%)
