= Mahinda Wijesekara =

Sri Lankan politician (1942–2026)

Hon. Mahinda Wijesekera
- මහින්ද විජේසේකර மஹிந்த விஜேசேகர

Member of Parliament for Matara District
- In office 1989–2010

Deputy Minister of Ports, Shipping, Rehabilitation and Reconstruction
- In office 1994–1997

Deputy Minister of Housing and Urban Development
- In office 1997–1999

Minister of Forestry and Environment
- In office 1999–2001

Minister of Fisheries and Ocean Resources
- In office 2001–2004

Minister of Special Projects
- In office 2007–2008

Minister of Postal and Telecommunication
- In office 2008–2010

Personal details
- Born: 21 September 1942 Devinuwara, British Ceylon
- Died: 2 April 2026 (aged 83)
- Party: Sri Lanka Freedom Party
- Other political affiliations: United People's Freedom Alliance
- Relations: Nimal Wijesekera - Brother
- Children: Kanchana Wijesekera
- Education: St. Servatius' College; Jayawardanepura Vidyodaya University, Sri Lanka Law College
- Profession: Lawyer

Mahinda Wijesekera (Sinhala: මහින්ද විජේසේකර, Tamil: மஹிந்த விஜேசேகர; 21 September 1942 – 2 April 2026) was a Sri Lankan politician who served as a cabinet minister. He was also a member of the Parliament of Sri Lanka for five terms, from 1989 to 2010.

== Life and career ==
Wijesekara was born in Devinuwara, British Ceylon on 21 September 1942.

In 2001, Wijesekara left the President Chandrika Kumaratunga's ruling Sri Lanka Freedom Party and joined United National Party along with few other senior ministers of the government such as S. B. Dissanayake and G. L. Peiris. He was a member of the working committee of UNP and the party organiser for Weligama. However, in 2006 UNP leader Ranil Wickramasinghe removed him from all of his positions in the party as a result of internal crisis against the leadership. On 2007, Wijesekara again crossed over to United People's Freedom Alliance government. He was the Telecommunications Minister in the government. He was injured in a suicide bombing in 2009.

Wijesekara died on 2 April 2026, at the age of 83, following a prolonged illness.
