= Kamburupitiya Polling Division =

Kamburupitiya
- Polling Division
- Coordinates: 6.035106°N 80.582098°E
- Country: Sri Lanka
- Province: Southern Province, Sri Lanka
- Electoral District: Matara Electoral District

Area
  - Total: 157.91 km^{2} (60.97 sq mi)

Population (2012)
  - Total: 94,795
  - Density: 600/km^{2} (1,600/sq mi)
- ISO 3166 code: EC-08D

The Kamburupitiya Polling Division is a Polling Division in the Matara Electoral District, in the Southern Province, Sri Lanka.

== Presidential Election Results ==
=== Summary ===
The winner of Kamburupitiya has matched the final country result 5 out of 8 times. Hence, Kamburupitiya is a Weak Bellwether for Presidential Elections.

Year	Kamburupitiya	Matara Electoral District	MAE %	Sri Lanka	MAE %
2019	SLPP	SLPP	3.89%	SLPP	18.04%
2015	UPFA	UPFA	5.16%	NDF	15.16%
2010	UPFA	UPFA	4.43%	UPFA	11.77%
2005	UPFA	UPFA	2.73%	UPFA	14.23%
1999	PA	PA	2.07%	PA	6.22%
1994	PA	PA	2.77%	PA	5.11%
1988	SLFP	SLFP	15.07%	UNP	22.86%
1982	SLFP	UNP	3.72%	UNP	7.44%
Matches/Mean MAE	5/8	6/8	4.98%	8/8	12.60%

=== 2019 Sri Lankan Presidential Election ===
Party	Kamburupitiya		Matara Electoral District		Sri Lanka	
Party	Votes	%	Votes	%	Votes	%
SLPP	48,140	71.53%	374,481	67.25%	6,924,255	52.25%
NDF	15,517	23.06%	149,026	26.76%	5,564,239	41.99%
NMPP	2,427	3.61%	23,439	4.21%	418,553	3.16%
Other Parties (with < 1%)	1,220	1.81%	9,922	1.78%	345,452	2.61%
Valid Votes	67,304	99.42%	556,868	99.33%	13,252,499	98.99%
Rejected Votes	396	0.58%	3,782	0.67%	135,452	1.01%
Total Polled	67,700	85.44%	560,650	85.93%	13,387,951	83.71%
Registered Electors	79,236		652,417		15,992,568	

=== 2015 Sri Lankan Presidential Election ===
Party	Kamburupitiya		Matara Electoral District		Sri Lanka	
Party	Votes	%	Votes	%	Votes	%
UPFA	40,084	63.06%	297,823	57.81%	5,768,090	47.58%
NDF	22,939	36.09%	212,435	41.24%	6,217,162	51.28%
Other Parties (with < 1%)	537	0.84%	4,892	0.95%	138,200	1.14%
Valid Votes	63,560	99.00%	515,150	99.06%	12,123,452	98.85%
Rejected Votes	639	1.00%	4,891	0.94%	140,925	1.15%
Total Polled	64,199	78.75%	520,041	80.23%	12,264,377	78.69%
Registered Electors	81,524		648,213		15,585,942	

=== 2010 Sri Lankan Presidential Election ===
Party	Kamburupitiya		Matara Electoral District		Sri Lanka	
Party	Votes	%	Votes	%	Votes	%
UPFA	40,879	70.04%	296,155	65.53%	6,015,934	57.88%
NDF	16,561	28.37%	148,510	32.86%	4,173,185	40.15%
Other Parties (with < 1%)	925	1.58%	7,264	1.61%	204,494	1.97%
Valid Votes	58,365	99.38%	451,929	99.34%	10,393,613	99.03%
Rejected Votes	364	0.62%	3,025	0.66%	101,838	0.97%
Total Polled	58,729	75.58%	454,954	76.51%	10,495,451	66.70%
Registered Electors	77,705		594,628		15,734,587	

=== 2005 Sri Lankan Presidential Election ===
Party	Kamburupitiya		Matara Electoral District		Sri Lanka	
Party	Votes	%	Votes	%	Votes	%
UPFA	37,641	64.63%	279,411	61.85%	4,887,152	50.29%
UNP	19,771	33.95%	165,837	36.71%	4,706,366	48.43%
Other Parties (with < 1%)	825	1.42%	6,474	1.43%	123,521	1.27%
Valid Votes	58,237	99.22%	451,722	99.11%	9,717,039	98.88%
Rejected Votes	458	0.78%	4,077	0.89%	109,869	1.12%
Total Polled	58,695	77.28%	455,799	78.95%	9,826,908	69.51%
Registered Electors	75,953		577,327		14,136,979	

=== 1999 Sri Lankan Presidential Election ===
Party	Kamburupitiya		Matara Electoral District		Sri Lanka	
Party	Votes	%	Votes	%	Votes	%
PA	28,515	56.97%	205,685	54.32%	4,312,157	51.12%
UNP	17,689	35.34%	139,677	36.89%	3,602,748	42.71%
JVP	2,997	5.99%	26,229	6.93%	343,927	4.08%
Other Parties (with < 1%)	853	1.70%	7,047	1.86%	176,679	2.09%
Valid Votes	50,054	98.26%	378,638	97.78%	8,435,754	97.69%
Rejected Votes	887	1.74%	8,583	2.22%	199,536	2.31%
Total Polled	50,941	72.61%	387,221	73.90%	8,635,290	72.17%
Registered Electors	70,157		524,002		11,965,536	

=== 1994 Sri Lankan Presidential Election ===
Party	Kamburupitiya		Matara Electoral District		Sri Lanka	
Party	Votes	%	Votes	%	Votes	%
PA	31,038	67.50%	227,865	64.69%	4,709,205	62.28%
UNP	14,133	30.73%	118,224	33.56%	2,715,283	35.91%
Other Parties (with < 1%)	813	1.77%	6,150	1.75%	137,040	1.81%
Valid Votes	45,984	98.60%	352,239	98.40%	7,561,526	98.03%
Rejected Votes	655	1.40%	5,731	1.60%	151,706	1.97%
Total Polled	46,639	67.54%	357,970	69.93%	7,713,232	69.12%
Registered Electors	69,050		511,933		11,158,880	

=== 1988 Sri Lankan Presidential Election ===
Party	Kamburupitiya		Matara Electoral District		Sri Lanka	
Party	Votes	%	Votes	%	Votes	%
SLFP	3,228	69.42%	57,424	54.30%	2,289,857	44.95%
UNP	1,256	27.01%	45,399	42.93%	2,569,199	50.43%
SLMP	166	3.57%	2,922	2.76%	235,701	4.63%
Valid Votes	4,650	98.12%	105,745	98.14%	5,094,754	98.24%
Rejected Votes	89	1.88%	2,003	1.86%	91,499	1.76%
Total Polled	4,739	7.45%	107,748	23.80%	5,186,256	55.87%
Registered Electors	63,590		452,637		9,283,143	

=== 1982 Sri Lankan Presidential Election ===
Party	Kamburupitiya		Matara Electoral District		Sri Lanka	
Party	Votes	%	Votes	%	Votes	%
SLFP	21,408	46.93%	144,587	43.29%	2,546,348	39.05%
UNP	20,549	45.05%	164,725	49.32%	3,450,815	52.93%
JVP	3,267	7.16%	22,117	6.62%	273,428	4.19%
Other Parties (with < 1%)	390	0.86%	2,554	0.76%	249,460	3.83%
Valid Votes	45,614	99.05%	333,983	99.08%	6,520,156	98.78%
Rejected Votes	437	0.95%	3,091	0.92%	80,470	1.22%
Total Polled	46,051	80.23%	337,074	82.90%	6,600,626	80.15%
Registered Electors	57,400		406,595		8,235,358	

== Parliamentary Election Results ==
=== Summary ===
The winner of Kamburupitiya has matched the final country result 5 out of 7 times. Hence, Kamburupitiya is a Weak Bellwether for Parliamentary Elections.

Year	Kamburupitiya	Matara Electoral District	MAE %	Sri Lanka	MAE %
2015	UPFA	UPFA	4.39%	UNP	11.52%
2010	UPFA	UPFA	3.42%	UPFA	6.67%
2004	UPFA	UPFA	1.96%	UPFA	9.55%
2001	PA	UNP	1.18%	UNP	4.60%
2000	PA	PA	1.80%	PA	5.62%
1994	PA	PA	4.97%	PA	13.04%
1989	UNP	UNP	8.36%	UNP	5.85%
Matches/Mean MAE	5/7	6/7	3.73%	7/7	8.12%

=== 2015 Sri Lankan Parliamentary Election ===
Party	Kamburupitiya		Matara Electoral District		Sri Lanka	
Party	Votes	%	Votes	%	Votes	%
UPFA	33,643	57.64%	250,505	52.70%	4,732,664	42.48%
UNP	20,356	34.88%	186,675	39.27%	5,098,916	45.77%
JVP	3,904	6.69%	35,270	7.42%	544,154	4.88%
Other Parties (with < 1%)	461	0.79%	2,890	0.61%	62,184	0.56%
Valid Votes	58,364	97.47%	475,340	96.93%	11,140,333	95.35%
Rejected Votes	1,427	2.38%	12,692	2.59%	516,926	4.42%
Total Polled	59,877	73.45%	490,409	78.61%	11,684,111	77.66%
Registered Electors	81,524		623,818		15,044,490	

=== 2010 Sri Lankan Parliamentary Election ===
Party	Kamburupitiya		Matara Electoral District		Sri Lanka	
Party	Votes	%	Votes	%	Votes	%
UPFA	28,834	69.12%	213,937	65.31%	4,846,388	60.38%
UNP	10,277	24.63%	91,114	27.81%	2,357,057	29.37%
DNA	2,257	5.41%	20,465	6.25%	441,251	5.50%
Other Parties (with < 1%)	350	0.84%	2,066	0.63%	53,531	0.67%
Valid Votes	41,718	95.63%	327,582	95.82%	8,026,322	96.03%
Rejected Votes	1,906	4.37%	14,289	4.18%	581,465	6.96%
Total Polled	43,624	56.14%	341,871	59.06%	8,358,246	59.29%
Registered Electors	77,705		578,858		14,097,690	

=== 2004 Sri Lankan Parliamentary Election ===
Party	Kamburupitiya		Matara Electoral District		Sri Lanka	
Party	Votes	%	Votes	%	Votes	%
UPFA	31,927	62.43%	241,235	60.27%	4,223,126	45.70%
UNP	16,879	33.01%	139,633	34.89%	3,486,792	37.73%
JHU	1,988	3.89%	16,229	4.05%	552,723	5.98%
Other Parties (with < 1%)	346	0.68%	3,136	0.78%	54,133	0.59%
Valid Votes	51,140	94.53%	400,233	94.62%	9,241,931	94.52%
Rejected Votes	2,958	5.47%	22,769	5.38%	534,452	5.47%
Total Polled	54,098	72.68%	423,002	76.84%	9,777,821	75.74%
Registered Electors	74,434		550,506		12,909,631	

=== 2001 Sri Lankan Parliamentary Election ===
Party	Kamburupitiya		Matara Electoral District		Sri Lanka	
Party	Votes	%	Votes	%	Votes	%
PA	23,194	44.15%	171,141	42.37%	3,330,815	37.19%
UNP	21,992	41.86%	171,661	42.49%	4,086,026	45.62%
JVP	6,479	12.33%	54,476	13.49%	815,353	9.10%
Other Parties (with < 1%)	869	1.65%	6,689	1.66%	133,373	1.49%
Valid Votes	52,534	94.95%	403,967	95.10%	8,955,844	94.77%
Rejected Votes	2,795	5.05%	20,820	4.90%	494,009	5.23%
Total Polled	55,329	76.22%	424,787	79.44%	9,449,878	76.03%
Registered Electors	72,590		534,694		12,428,762	

=== 2000 Sri Lankan Parliamentary Election ===
Party	Kamburupitiya		Matara Electoral District		Sri Lanka	
Party	Votes	%	Votes	%	Votes	%
PA	28,022	54.07%	203,690	51.47%	3,899,329	45.33%
UNP	18,823	36.32%	146,855	37.11%	3,451,765	40.12%
JVP	4,179	8.06%	38,757	9.79%	518,725	6.03%
Other Parties (with < 1%)	803	1.55%	6,462	1.63%	238,931	2.78%
Valid Votes	51,827	N/A	395,764	N/A	8,602,617	N/A

=== 1994 Sri Lankan Parliamentary Election ===
Party	Kamburupitiya		Matara Electoral District		Sri Lanka	
Party	Votes	%	Votes	%	Votes	%
PA	32,318	65.00%	227,285	59.90%	3,887,805	48.94%
UNP	16,069	32.32%	142,024	37.43%	3,498,370	44.04%
SLPF	1,098	2.21%	8,736	2.30%	90,078	1.13%
Other Parties (with < 1%)	232	0.47%	1,422	0.37%	68,538	0.86%
Valid Votes	49,717	95.55%	379,467	95.67%	7,943,688	95.20%
Rejected Votes	2,318	4.45%	17,167	4.33%	400,395	4.80%
Total Polled	52,035	75.36%	396,634	77.60%	8,344,095	74.75%
Registered Electors	69,050		511,109		11,163,064	

=== 1989 Sri Lankan Parliamentary Election ===
Party	Kamburupitiya		Matara Electoral District		Sri Lanka	
Party	Votes	%	Votes	%	Votes	%
UNP	1,231	46.07%	45,734	56.11%	2,838,005	50.71%
SLFP	1,136	42.51%	28,752	35.28%	1,785,369	31.90%
ELJP	178	6.66%	1,481	1.82%	67,723	1.21%
USA	103	3.85%	4,225	5.18%	141,983	2.54%
Other Parties (with < 1%)	24	0.90%	1,313	1.61%	90,480	1.62%
Valid Votes	2,672	91.92%	81,505	94.08%	5,596,468	93.87%
Rejected Votes	235	8.08%	5,128	5.92%	365,563	6.13%
Total Polled	2,907	4.65%	86,633	19.17%	5,962,031	63.60%
Registered Electors	62,577		451,926		9,374,164	

== Demographics ==
=== Ethnicity ===
The Kamburupitiya Polling Division has a Sinhalese majority (99.2%) . In comparison, the Matara Electoral District (which contains the Kamburupitiya Polling Division) has a Sinhalese majority (94.3%)

Ethnicity in Kamburupitiya
1. Sinhalese (99.2%)
2. Other (0.80%)

=== Religion ===
The Kamburupitiya Polling Division has a Buddhist majority (99.0%) . In comparison, the Matara Electoral District (which contains the Kamburupitiya Polling Division) has a Buddhist majority (94.1%)

Religion in Kamburupitiya
1. Buddhist (99.0%)
2. Other (1.00%)
