= Matara Electoral District =

Electoral district in Sri Lanka

Matara
- Electoral District for the Parliament of Sri Lanka
- Administrative District: Matara
- Province: Southern
- Polling divisions: 7
- Population: 873,000 (2021)
- Electorate: 686,175 (2024)
- Area: 1,283 km^{2} (495 sq mi)

Current Electoral District
- Number of members: 7
- MPs: NPP (6) Sunil Handunnetti; Saroja Polraj; L. M. Abeywickrama; Akram Ilyas; Gammaddage Ajantha; Lal Premanath SJB (1) Chathura Galappaththi

Matara electoral district is one of the 22 multi-member electoral districts of Sri Lanka created by the 1978 Constitution of Sri Lanka. The district is conterminous with the administrative district of Matara in the Southern province. The district currently elects 7 of the 225 members of the Sri Lankan Parliament and had 578,858 registered electors in 2010. The district is the country's Electorate Number 08.

== Polling Divisions ==
The Matara Electoral District consists of the following polling divisions:

A: Deniyaya

B: Hakmana

C: Akuressa

D: Kamburupitiya

E: Devinuwara

F: Matara

G: Weligama

== 1982 Presidential Election ==
Results of the 1st presidential election held on 20 October 1982 for the district:

Candidate	Party	Votes per Polling Division							Postal Votes	Total Votes	%
Candidate	Party	Akur- essa	Deni- yaya	Devi- nuwara	Hak- mana	Kambur -upitiya	Matara	Weli- gama	Postal Votes	Total Votes	%
Junius Jayewardene	UNP	24,667	22,457	22,605	22,146	20,549	23,221	25,051	4,029	164,725	49.32%
Hector Kobbekaduwa	SLFP	20,389	18,147	17,757	22,984	21,408	19,333	22,282	2,287	144,587	43.29%
Rohana Wijeweera	JVP	4,781	1,886	4,874	2,711	3,267	2,067	2,276	255	22,117	6.62%
Colvin R. de Silva	LSSP	246	220	246	228	229	156	198	48	1,571	0.47%
Vasudeva Nanayakkara	NSSP	70	63	52	71	78	67	90	18	509	0.15%
Kumar Ponnambalam	ACTC	108	72	49	61	83	22	78	1	474	0.14%
Valid Votes		50,261	42,845	45,583	48,201	45,614	44,866	49,975	6,638	333,983	100.00%
Rejected Votes		421	428	457	420	437	408	451	69	3,091	
Total Polled		50,682	43,273	46,040	48,621	46,051	45,274	50,426	6,707	337,074	
Registered Electors		59,798	49,817	56,693	57,203	57,400	56,252	62,725		399,888	
Turnout		84.76%	86.86%	81.21%	85.00%	80.23%	80.48%	80.39%		84.29%	

== 1988 Presidential Election ==
Results of the 2nd presidential election held on 19 December 1988 for the district:

Candidate	Party	Votes per Polling Division							Postal Votes	Total Votes	%
Candidate	Party	Akur- essa	Deni- yaya	Devi- nuwara	Hak- mana	Kambur -upitiya	Matara	Weli- gama	Postal Votes	Total Votes	%
Sirimavo Bandaranaike	SLFP	3,505	10,949	4,403	1,494	3,228	17,718	15,802	325	57,424	54.30%
Ranasinghe Premadasa	UNP	5,346	10,157	5,076	1,327	1,256	11,606	10,351	280	45,399	42.93%
Oswin Abeygunasekara	SLMP	312	554	188	41	166	1,098	532	31	2,922	2.76%
Valid Votes		9,163	21,660	9,667	2,862	4,650	30,422	26,685	636	105,745	100.00%
Rejected Votes		277	378	104	51	89	497	540	67	2,003	
Total Polled		9,440	22,038	9,771	2,913	4,739	30,919	27,225	703	107,748	
Registered Electors		67,076	58,342	62,490	65,407	63,590	64,438	70,591		451,934	
Turnout		14.07%	37.77%	15.64%	4.45%	7.45%	47.98%	38.57%		23.84%	

== 1989 Parliamentary General Election ==
Results of the 9th parliamentary election held on 15 February 1989 for the district:

Party	Votes per Polling Division							Postal Votes	Total Votes	%	Seats
Party	Akur- essa	Deni- yaya	Devi- nuwara	Hak- mana	Kambur -upitiya	Matara	Weli- gama	Postal Votes	Total Votes	%	Seats
United National Party	5,454	3,556	6,622	218	1,231	16,505	9,141	3,007	45,734	56.11%	6
Sri Lanka Freedom Party	2,902	2,301	1,369	149	1,136	11,094	7,508	2,293	28,752	35.28%	3
United Socialist Alliance (CPSL, LSSP, NSSP, SLMP)	481	104	18	2	103	2,879	262	376	4,225	5.18%	0
United Lanka People's Party	162	91	2	97	178	705	151	95	1,481	1.82%	0
Mahajana Eksath Peramuna	82	105	2	3	24	240	754	103	1,313	1.61%	0
Valid Votes	9,081	6,157	8,013	469	2,672	31,423	17,816	5,874	81,505	100.00%	9
Rejected Votes	836	567	149	43	235	1,835	1,237	226	5,128		
Total Polled	9,917	6,724	8,162	512	2,907	33,258	19,053	6,100	86,633		
Registered Electors	66,310	58,008	61,452	64,833	62,577	62,612	69,515	6,619	451,926		
Turnout	14.96%	11.59%	13.28%	0.79%	4.65%	53.12%	27.41%	92.16%	19.17%		

The following candidates were elected: Gamini Fonseka (UNP), 19,618 preference votes (pv); Mahinda Wijesekara (SLFP), 18,517 pv; Mangala Samaraweera (SLFP), 11,971 pv; Ranjan Wijayawardhana (UNP), 9,925 pv; Abeywardhana Dayananda Wickremasinghe (UNP), 9,579 pv; Madurapala Ediriweera (UNP), 8,562 pv; H. R Piyasiri (UNP), 8,446 pv; Hewagampolage Sirisena (SLFP), 8,212 pv; and Peter Silva Loku Galappaththy (UNP), 7,094 pv.

== 1993 Provincial Council Election ==
Results of the 2nd Southern provincial council election held on 17 May 1993 for the district:

Party	Votes	%	Seats
United National Party	145,093	44.99%	
People's Alliance (SLFP et al.)	129,693	40.22%	
Democratic United National Front	44,873	13.91%	
Others	2,826	0.88%	
Valid Votes	322,485	100.00%	
Rejected Votes	22,979		
Total Polled	345,464		
Registered Electors	493,503		
Turnout	70.00%		

== 1994 Provincial Council Election ==
Results of the 3rd Southern provincial council election held on 24 March 1994 for the district:

Party	Votes	%	Seats
People's Alliance (SLFP et al.)	192,853	56.43%	
United National Party	147,301	43.10%	
Nava Sama Samaja Party	1,586	0.46%	
Valid Votes	341,740	100.00%	
Rejected Votes	17,397		
Total Polled	359,137		
Registered Electors	493,503		
Turnout	72.77%		

== 1994 Parliamentary General Election ==
Results of the 10th parliamentary election held on 16 August 1994 for the district:

Party	Votes per Polling Division							Postal Votes	Total Votes	%	Seats
Party	Akur- essa	Deni- yaya	Devi- nuwara	Hak- mana	Kambur -upitiya	Matara	Weli- gama	Postal Votes	Total Votes	%	Seats
People's Alliance (SLFP et al.)	32,837	30,743	28,191	30,834	32,318	32,629	34,760	4,973	227,285	59.90%	5
United National Party	21,999	23,930	19,335	20,608	16,069	18,915	19,013	2,155	142,024	37.43%	3
Sri Lanka Progressive Front (JVP)	1,554	756	1,304	991	1,098	1,264	1,600	169	8,736	2.30%	0
Mahajana Eksath Peramuna	247	178	105	181	232	246	182	51	1,422	0.37%	0
Valid Votes	56,637	55,607	48,935	52,614	49,717	53,054	55,555	7,348	379,467	100.00%	8
Rejected Votes	2,674	3,330	1,841	2,965	2,318	1,632	2,325	82	17,167		
Total Polled	59,311	58,937	50,776	55,579	52,035	54,686	57,880	7,430	396,634		
Registered Electors	74,562	71,106	66,923	70,889	69,050	73,461	77,479		503,470		
Turnout	79.55%	82.89%	75.87%	78.40%	75.36%	74.44%	74.70%		78.78%		

The following candidates were elected: Dullas Alahapperuma (PA), 76,678 preference votes (pv); Ronnie de Mel (UNP), 66,563 pv; Mahinda Wijesekara (PA), 65,769 pv; Chandrasiri Gajadeera (PA), 62,852 pv; Mangala Samaraweera (PA), 61,574 pv; Eugin Alwis Samarasinghe (PA), 57,455 pv; Lakshman Yapa Abeywardena (UNP), 52,294 pv; and Handunneththi Rannulu Wimalasiri (UNP), 33,078 pv.

== 1994 Presidential Election ==
Results of the 3rd presidential election held on 9 November 1994 for the district:

Candidate	Party	Votes per Polling Division							Postal Votes	Total Votes	%
Candidate	Party	Akur- essa	Deni- yaya	Devi- nuwara	Hak- mana	Kambur -upitiya	Matara	Weli- gama	Postal Votes	Total Votes	%
Chandrika Kumaratunga	PA	32,632	30,662	30,817	29,756	31,038	32,503	34,583	5,874	227,865	64.69%
Srimathi Dissanayake	UNP	18,165	18,819	14,824	17,473	14,133	15,751	16,708	2,351	118,224	33.56%
Hudson Samarasinghe	Ind 2	327	465	185	407	305	152	201	13	2,055	0.58%
Harischandra Wijayatunga	SMBP	175	316	185	240	213	205	173	57	1,564	0.44%
Nihal Galappaththi	SLPF	211	290	197	207	167	123	172	30	1,397	0.40%
A.J. Ranashinge	Ind 1	145	213	169	163	128	138	145	33	1,134	0.32%
Valid Votes		51,655	50,765	46,377	48,246	45,984	48,872	51,982	8,358	352,239	100.00%
Rejected Votes		903	1,293	624	828	655	648	675	105	5,731	
Total Polled		52,558	52,058	47,001	49,074	46,639	49,520	52,657	8,463	357,970	
Registered Electors		74,562	71,106	66,923	70,889	69,050	73,461	77,479		503,470	
Turnout		70.49%	73.21%	70.23%	69.23%	67.54%	67.41%	67.96%		71.10%	

== 1999 Provincial Council Election ==
Results of the 4th Southern provincial council election held on 10 June 1999 for the district:

Party	Votes	%	Seats
People's Alliance (SLFP, SLMC et al.)	157,762	46.36%	8
United National Party	130,843	38.45%	7
Janatha Vimukthi Peramuna	40,276	11.84%	2
Independent 1	5,749	1.69%	0
New Left Front (NSSP et al.)	2,906	0.85%	0
Mahajana Eksath Peramuna	1,160	0.34%	0
People's Liberation Solidarity Front	448	0.13%	0
Sinhalaye Mahasammatha Bhoomiputra Pakshaya	399	0.12%	0
Liberal Party	298	0.09%	0
Independent 2	292	0.09%	0
People's Freedom Front	143	0.04%	0
Valid Votes	340,276	100.00%	17
Rejected Votes			
Total Polled			
Registered Electors	510,310		
Turnout			

== 1999 Presidential Election ==
Results of the 4th presidential election held on 21 December 1999 for the district:

Candidate	Party	Votes per Polling Division							Postal Votes	Total Votes	%
Candidate	Party	Akur- essa	Deni- yaya	Devi- nuwara	Hak- mana	Kambur -upitiya	Matara	Weli- gama	Postal Votes	Total Votes	%
Chandrika Kumaratunga	PA	30,040	29,229	25,363	29,115	28,515	28,865	30,939	3,619	205,685	54.32%
Ranil Wickremasinghe	UNP	21,330	21,400	18,844	19,464	17,689	18,743	19,183	3,024	139,677	36.89%
Nandana Gunathilake	JVP	4,231	3,108	4,539	3,471	2,997	3,273	3,674	936	26,229	6.93%
Harischandra Wijayatunga	SMBP	195	207	155	194	201	276	219	92	1,539	0.41%
W.V.M. Ranjith	Ind 2	154	251	99	199	126	86	123	4	1,042	0.28%
Rajiva Wijesinha	Liberal	182	223	107	170	147	72	87	9	997	0.26%
T. Edirisuriya	Ind 1	145	157	100	192	106	72	114	5	891	0.24%
Vasudeva Nanayakkara	LDA	72	95	84	54	68	156	67	74	670	0.18%
Abdul Rasool	SLMP	99	116	56	85	68	94	116	5	639	0.17%
Kamal Karunadasa	PLSF	100	111	62	92	50	54	71	3	543	0.14%
Hudson Samarasinghe	Ind 3	58	75	47	57	41	19	35	0	332	0.09%
A.W. Premawardhana	PFF	40	45	15	32	24	18	26	2	202	0.05%
A. Dissanayaka	DUNF	34	38	24	36	22	15	20	3	192	0.05%
Valid Votes		56,680	55,055	49,495	53,161	50,054	51,743	54,674	7,776	378,638	100.00%
Rejected Votes		1,090	1,464	963	983	887	1,790	1,027	379	8,583	
Total Polled		57,770	56,519	50,458	54,144	50,941	53,533	55,701	8,155	387,221	
Registered Electors		76,916	74,409	68,296	75,156	70,157	72,593	78,320		515,847	
Turnout		75.11%	75.96%	73.88%	72.04%	72.61%	73.74%	71.12%		75.07%	

== 2000 Parliamentary General Election ==
Results of the 11th parliamentary election held on 10 October 2000 for the district:

Party	Votes per Polling Division							Postal Votes	Total Votes	%	Seats
Party	Akur- essa	Deni- yaya	Devi- nuwara	Hak- mana	Kambur -upitiya	Matara	Weli- gama	Postal Votes	Total Votes	%	Seats
People's Alliance (SLFP et al.)	30,699	29,427	24,263	28,636	28,022	28,736	29,608	4,299	203,690	51.47%	5
United National Party	21,688	23,807	17,826	21,728	18,823	19,706	20,276	3,001	146,855	37.11%	2
Janatha Vimukthi Peramuna	5,879	3,986	7,489	4,522	4,179	5,200	6,262	1,240	38,757	9.79%	1
Sinhala Heritage	476	166	395	215	388	1,024	559	152	3,375	0.85%	0
Sinhalaye Mahasammatha Bhoomiputra Pakshaya	114	38	50	61	114	82	83	26	568	0.14%	0
United Sinhala Great Council	85	136	59	101	69	48	50	0	548	0.14%	0
People's Liberation Solidarity Front	59	32	30	52	25	72	56	10	336	0.08%	0
Liberal Party	46	72	30	45	32	28	42	1	296	0.07%	0
Citizen's Front	42	47	40	39	43	26	38	1	276	0.07%	0
Independent 5	30	58	20	28	29	27	22	0	214	0.05%	0
Democratic United National Front	26	48	21	41	29	24	23	1	213	0.05%	0
Independent 3	30	30	26	17	20	11	21	2	157	0.04%	0
Left & Democratic Alliance	17	20	12	12	7	28	15	4	115	0.03%	0
Independent 4	20	16	8	21	6	9	11	0	91	0.02%	0
Independent 2	19	6	5	16	15	14	11	1	87	0.02%	0
Independent 1	13	19	7	8	13	5	8	0	73	0.02%	0
Sri Lanka Progressive Front	8	11	7	9	8	9	5	0	57	0.01%	0
Peoples Freedom Front	10	11	9	9	5	5	5	2	56	0.01%	0
Valid Votes	59,261	57,930	50,297	55,560	51,827	55,054	57,095	8,740	395,764	100.00%	8
Rejected Votes	3,207	3,869	1,946	3,601	2,537	2,022	2,752	197	20,131		
Total Polled	62,468	61,799	52,243	59,161	54,364	57,076	59,847	8,937	415,895		
Registered Electors	78,408	76,101	69,003	76,562	71,211	73,737	79,629		524,651		
Turnout	79.67%	81.21%	75.71%	77.27%	76.34%	77.40%	75.16%		79.27%		

The following candidates were elected: Mangala Samaraweera (PA), 93,110 preference votes (pv); Mahinda Wijesekara (PA), 83,625 pv; Lakshman Yapa Abeywardena (UNP), 81,053 pv; Mahinda Yapa Abeywardena (PA), 70,091 pv; Sagala Ratnayaka (UNP), 58,634 pv; Dullas Alahapperuma (PA), 48,721 pv; Chandrasiri Gajadeera (PA), 43,913 pv; and Jinadasa Kitulagoda (JVP), 4,012 pv.

== 2001 Parliamentary General Election ==
Results of the 12th parliamentary election held on 5 December 2001 for the district:

Party	Votes per Polling Division							Postal Votes	Total Votes	%	Seats
Party	Akur- essa	Deni- yaya	Devi- nuwara	Hak- mana	Kambur -upitiya	Matara	Weli- gama	Postal Votes	Total Votes	%	Seats
United National Front (UNP, SLMC, CWC, WPF)	25,372	26,114	22,490	23,457	21,992	24,376	24,241		171,661	42.49%	4
People's Alliance (SLFP et al.)	25,294	24,399	20,021	24,577	23,194	24,480	25,703		171,141	42.37%	3
Janatha Vimukthi Peramuna	9,120	6,776	8,378	7,094	6,479	6,763	8,058		54,476	13.49%	1
New Left Front (NSSP et al.)	437	571	284	511	384	253	330		2,780	0.69%	0
Sinhala Heritage	185	135	223	177	223	536	298		1,854	0.46%	0
United Socialist Party	138	178	91	162	91	74	110		856	0.21%	0
Independent 5	29	43	23	27	35	18	33		208	0.05%	0
People's Freedom Front	24	53	17	28	27	17	29		196	0.05%	0
United Sinhala Great Council	17	33	23	21	20	7	21		143	0.04%	0
Sinhalaye Mahasammatha Bhoomiputra Pakshaya	28	18	11	11	25	20	13		129	0.03%	0
National Development Front	22	20	11	26	13	16	20		128	0.03%	0
Independent 3	18	30	16	26	14	13	10		128	0.03%	0
Independent 1	18	14	6	14	11	13	14		91	0.02%	0
Independent 2	6	12	5	11	13	4	9		60	0.01%	0
Sri Lanka Progressive Front	8	10	8	7	8	11	6		58	0.01%	0
Independent 4	11	17	6	6	5	5	8		58	0.01%	0
Valid Votes	60,727	58,423	51,613	56,155	52,534	56,606	58,903		403,967	100.00%	8
Rejected Votes	3,172	4,030	2,120	3,878	2,795	1,983	2,608		20,820		
Total Polled	63,899	62,453	53,733	60,033	55,329	58,589	61,511		424,787		
Registered Electors	79,850	77,540	70,412	77,929	72,590	75,301	81,072		534,694		
Turnout	80.02%	80.54%	76.31%	77.04%	76.22%	77.81%	75.87%		79.44%		

The following candidates were elected: Mangala Samaraweera (PA), 105,992 preference votes (pv); Mahinda Wijesekara (UNF), 95,378 pv; Lakshman Yapa Abeywardena (UNF), 81,617 pv; Mahinda Yapa Abeywardena (PA), 64,756 pv; Justin Galappathi (UNF), 60,548 pv; Mallika de Mel (PA), 60,531 pv; Sagala Ratnayaka (UNF), 55,423 pv; and Jinadasa Kitulagoda (JVP), 4,799 pv.

== 2004 Parliamentary General Election ==
Results of the 13th parliamentary election held on 2 April 2004 for the district:

Party	Votes per Polling Division							Postal Votes	Total Votes	%	Seats
Party	Akur- essa	Deni- yaya	Devi- nuwara	Hak- mana	Kambur -upitiya	Matara	Weli- gama	Postal Votes	Total Votes	%	Seats
United People's Freedom Alliance (SLFP, JVP et al.)	35,747	33,051	30,360	34,158	31,927	32,967	34,824	8,201	241,235	60.27%	5
United National Front (UNP, SLMC, CWC, WPF)	21,318	23,262	16,473	18,582	16,879	19,458	19,996	3,665	139,633	34.89%	3
Jathika Hela Urumaya	1,733	1,197	2,331	1,421	1,988	4,309	2,462	788	16,229	4.05%	0
United Socialist Party	253	376	148	226	167	146	204	6	1,526	0.38%	0
National Development Front	91	123	99	118	102	84	92	9	718	0.18%	0
Independent 7	49	63	15	34	21	25	37	1	245	0.06%	0
New Left Front (NSSP et al.)	20	29	16	18	17	52	36	4	192	0.05%	0
Independent 6	25	36	4	15	7	10	20	0	117	0.03%	0
Independent 1	4	11	6	10	7	7	7	0	52	0.01%	0
Liberal Party	6	8	7	14	4	4	6	1	50	0.01%	0
Independent 3	6	8	5	2	3	6	5	1	36	0.01%	0
Independent 2	2	12	3	6	4	3	4	0	34	0.01%	0
Independent 5	1	12	5	7	1	3	5	0	34	0.01%	0
Sinhalaye Mahasammatha Bhoomiputra Pakshaya	5	3	4	5	7	4	5	0	33	0.01%	0
Sri Lanka National Front	7	5	3	4	2	2	6	0	29	0.01%	0
Swarajya	6	2	7	3	1	3	4	0	26	0.01%	0
Independent 4	8	3	2	5	1	0	3	1	23	0.01%	0
Sri Lanka Progressive Front	1	1	3	5	2	8	1	0	21	0.01%	0
Valid Votes	59,282	58,202	49,491	54,633	51,140	57,091	57,717	12,677	400,233	100.00%	8
Rejected Votes	3,427	4,545	2,365	3,846	2,958	1,999	3,422	207	22,769		
Total Polled	62,709	62,747	51,856	58,479	54,098	59,090	61,139	12,884	423,002		
Registered Electors	82,330	80,259	71,812	79,918	74,434	78,465	83,288		550,506		
Turnout	76.17%	78.18%	72.21%	73.17%	72.68%	75.31%	73.41%		76.84%		

The following candidates were elected: Mangala Samaraweera (UPFA-SLFP), 118,848 preference votes (pv); Jinadasa Kitulagoda (UPFA-JVP), 109,417 pv; Pemasiri Manage (UPFA-JVP), 101,558 pv; Mahinda Wijesekara (UNF-UNP), 72,563 pv; Lakshman Yapa Abeywardena (UNF-UNP), 66,498 pv; Mahinda Yapa Abeywardena (UPFA-SLFP), 60,453 pv; Sagala Ratnayaka (UNF-UNP), 59,888 pv; and Chandrasiri Gajadeera (UPFA-CPSL), 46,138 pv.

== 2004 Provincial Council Election ==
Results of the 5th Southern provincial council election held on 10 July 2004 for the district:

Party	Votes per Polling Division							Postal Votes	Total Votes	%	Seats
Party	Akur- essa	Deni- yaya	Devi- nuwara	Hak- mana	Kambur -upitiya	Matara	Weli- gama	Postal Votes	Total Votes	%	Seats
United People's Freedom Alliance (SLFP, JVP et al.)	25,586	24,440	24,085	23,922	25,655	25,993	27,418	4,977	182,076	64.30%	12
United National Party	14,639	17,285	10,944	11,692	10,513	13,467	13,942	1,966	94,448	33.35%	6
Independent	221	123	51	3,168	901	66	41	44	4,615	1.63%	0
People's Liberation Solidarity Front	120	121	59	74	107	83	36	17	617	0.22%	0
United Socialist Party	70	118	66	65	66	48	95	6	534	0.19%	0
United Lalith Front	61	72	38	33	41	39	60	4	348	0.12%	0
Liberal Party	106	19	13	15	12	10	10	1	186	0.07%	0
Sinhalaye Mahasammatha Bhoomiputra Pakshaya	19	18	25	27	26	33	17	17	182	0.06%	0
United Sinhala Great Council	10	21	7	90	15	9	12	8	172	0.06%	0
Valid Votes	40,832	42,217	35,288	39,086	37,336	39,748	41,631	7,040	283,178	100.00%	18
Rejected Votes	2,363	2,993	2,091	2,411	2,307	2,092	2,367	368	16,992		
Total Polled	43,195	45,210	37,379	41,497	39,643	41,840	43,998	7,408	300,170		
Registered Electors	82,330	80,259	71,812	79,918	75,434	78,465	83,288		551,506		
Turnout	52.47%	56.33%	52.05%	51.92%	52.55%	53.32%	52.83%		54.43%		

The following candidates were elected: Akalanka Buddika Pathirana (UNP), 44,165 preference votes (pv); S. Rathanayake (UPFA), 42,771 pv; Justin Galappaththi (UNP), 31,953 pv; Arachchige Saman Kumara Suraweera (UPFA), 29,813 pv; L. B. Lal Premanath (UPFA), 29,790 pv; N. K. Sisira Kumara (UPFA), 29,064 pv; Gunasekara Wickramarathna Hemal (UPFA), 29,021 pv; S. Vijaya Bindu Weerasinghe (UPFA), 26,270 pv; Dhamvijaya Wijesekara Dahanayake (UPFA), 25,174 pv; Abewickrama Danvas Stanly (UPFA), 25,057 pv; Handunneththi Rannulu Piyasiri (UPFA), 24,841 pv; Weerasumana Weerasinghe (UPFA), 22,095 pv; Suduweli Kondage Lakmal Nilantha (UPFA), 19,192 pv; Handunge Sosindra Nandana (UPFA), 18,422 pv; Sirisena Wijewickrama Kankanamge (UNP), 17,878 pv; Kapila Jayantha Wellappili (UNP), 14,620 pv; Amaraweera Wickrama Gunawardhana Jinadasa (UNP), 11,122 pv; and Madduma Patabandige Praneeth Padmathilaka (UNP), 9,312 pv.

== 2005 Presidential Election ==
Results of the 5th presidential election held on 17 November 2005 for the district:

Candidate	Party	Votes per Polling Division							Postal Votes	Total Votes	%
Candidate	Party	Akur- essa	Deni- yaya	Devi- nuwara	Hak- mana	Kambur -upitiya	Matara	Weli- gama	Postal Votes	Total Votes	%
Mahinda Rajapaksa	UPFA	41,091	36,916	35,319	40,567	37,641	37,829	40,027	10,021	279,411	61.85%
Ranil Wickremasinghe	UNP	25,103	28,015	19,288	22,366	19,771	22,941	24,225	4,128	165,837	36.71%
A.A. Suraweera	NDF	326	330	216	368	229	162	242	4	1,877	0.42%
Siritunga Jayasuriya	USP	279	370	191	294	197	127	226	3	1,687	0.37%
Victor Hettigoda	ULPP	68	87	96	75	58	77	66	27	554	0.12%
Chamil Jayaneththi	NLF	98	109	51	90	84	36	52	4	524	0.12%
Wimal Geeganage	SLNF	79	83	42	88	78	26	53	2	451	0.10%
Aruna de Soyza	RPP	63	73	68	98	55	37	50	7	451	0.10%
A.K.J. Arachchige	DUA	51	54	30	71	37	28	48	1	320	0.07%
Anura De Silva	ULF	43	52	29	45	47	23	36	2	277	0.06%
Wije Dias	SEP	20	32	11	19	17	19	15	7	140	0.03%
P. Nelson Perera	SLPF	18	33	5	27	14	10	12	0	119	0.03%
H.S. Dharmadwaja	UNAF	7	19	8	10	9	7	13	1	74	0.02%
Valid Votes		67,246	66,173	55,354	64,118	58,237	61,322	65,065	14,207	451,722	100.00%
Rejected Votes		570	879	415	571	458	483	568	133	4,077	
Total Polled		67,816	67,052	55,769	64,689	58,695	61,805	65,633	14,340	455,799	
Registered Electors		84,867	82,636	73,005	82,128	75,953	79,784	84,614		562,987	
Turnout		79.91%	81.14%	76.39%	78.77%	77.28%	77.47%	77.57%		80.96%	

== 2009 Provincial Council Election ==
Results of the 6th Southern provincial council election held on 10 October 2009 for the district:

Party	Votes per Polling Division							Postal Votes	Total Votes	%	Seats
Party	Akur- essa	Deni- yaya	Devi- nuwara	Hak- mana	Kambur -upitiya	Matara	Weli- gama	Postal Votes	Total Votes	%	Seats
United People's Freedom Alliance (SLFP et al.)	39,629	40,706	29,812	40,025	36,350	29,770	34,955	5,863	257,110	67.97%	12
United National Party	15,594	12,079	12,328	11,251	10,793	17,966	13,287	1,316	94,614	25.01%	5
Janatha Vimukthi Peramuna	3,340	2,099	3,127	2,644	2,672	3,647	2,449	709	20,687	5.47%	1
Sri Lanka Muslim Congress	240	43	662	184	146	274	2,713	18	4,280	1.13%	0
United National Alliance	55	67	43	52	57	46	48	3	371	0.10%	0
National Development Front	39	56	33	38	67	22	36	3	294	0.08%	0
Independent 1	10	10	96	83	29	15	6	3	252	0.07%	0
United Socialist Party	13	40	59	22	22	35	25	2	218	0.06%	0
Janasetha Peramuna	11	2	8	8	11	55	2	1	98	0.03%	0
Democratic Unity Alliance	4	15	8	14	8	4	7	1	61	0.02%	0
Independent 3	10	7	7	12	9	6	6	2	59	0.02%	0
Patriotic National Front	4	7	4	12	7	5	4	0	43	0.01%	0
United Lanka Great Council	10	4	3	14	3	2	0	0	36	0.01%	0
Sri Lanka Progressive Front	2	6	4	2	3	4	12	1	34	0.01%	0
Sinhalaye Mahasammatha Bhoomiputra Pakshaya	5	3	3	4	3	7	5	2	32	0.01%	0
Independent 2	3	5	3	9	6	4	2	0	32	0.01%	0
Ruhuna People's Party	2	6	4	7	3	3	6	0	31	0.01%	0
Valid Votes	58,971	55,155	46,204	54,381	50,189	51,865	53,563	7,924	378,252	100.00%	18
Rejected Votes	2,375	3,281	1,673	3,022	2,316	1,827	2,070	163	16,727		
Total Polled	61,346	58,436	47,877	57,403	52,505	53,692	55,633	8,087	394,979		
Registered Electors	87,510	86,311	74,601	85,686	77,705	80,334	86,711		578,858		
Turnout	70.10%	67.70%	64.18%	66.99%	67.57%	66.84%	64.16%		68.23%		

The following candidates were elected: Gunasekara Wickramarathna Hemal (UPFA), 63,323 preference votes (pv); Akalanka Buddika Pathirana (UNP), 57,802 pv; Abeywardhana Sarath Yapa (UPFA), 45,882 pv; Chandima Rasaputhra (UPFA), 40,066 pv; Dhamvijaya Wijesekara Dahanayake (UPFA), 32,972 pv; S. Vijaya Bindu Weerasinghe (UPFA), 32,041 pv; Weerasumana Weerasinghe (UPFA), 31,945 pv; Anthonige Hewa Piyasena (UPFA), 31,423 pv; Manoj Sirisena Hewagampalage (UPFA), 31,033 pv; Kanchana Wodatha Wijesekara (UPFA), 30,870 pv; Jayantha Kodithuwakku Hewa Kodithuwakku Manamalarachchige (UPFA), 29,282 pv; Justin Galappaththi (UPFA), 28,371 pv; Aruna Gunarathna (UPFA), 28,239 pv; Gayan Sanjeewa Hewa Wellalage (UNP), 17,654 pv; Kapila Jayantha Wellappili (UNP), 15,041 pv; Sirisena Wijewickrama Kankanamge (UNP), 14,274 pv; A. A. Haputhanthrige Windana Nishantha (UNP), 13,758 pv; and N. K. Sisira Kumara (JVP), 3,189 pv.

== 2010 Presidential Election ==
Results of the 6th presidential election held on 26 January 2010 for the district:

Candidate	Party	Votes per Polling Division							Postal Votes	Total Votes	%
Candidate	Party	Akur- essa	Deni- yaya	Devi- nuwara	Hak- mana	Kambur -upitiya	Matara	Weli- gama	Postal Votes	Total Votes	%
Mahinda Rajapaksa	UPFA	44,527	42,999	36,428	45,590	40,879	33,948	41,359	10,425	296,155	65.53%
Sarath Fonseka	NDF	21,926	20,939	17,219	17,626	16,561	27,102	21,978	5,159	148,510	32.86%
A.A. Suraweera	NDF	185	332	145	300	149	95	172	3	1,381	0.31%
M.C.M. Ismail	DUNF	144	250	116	220	170	87	91	10	1,088	0.24%
W.V. Mahiman Ranjith	Ind 1	130	205	74	154	108	59	95	4	829	0.18%
C.J. Sugathsiri Gamage	UDF	112	142	84	97	85	61	150	5	736	0.16%
A.S.P Liyanage	SLLP	95	139	62	99	93	43	64	2	597	0.13%
Siritunga Jayasuriya	USP	54	95	23	49	42	26	50	6	345	0.08%
Ukkubanda Wijekoon	Ind 3	54	60	35	53	52	23	51	1	329	0.07%
Sarath Manamendra	NSH	45	81	33	45	31	38	39	1	313	0.07%
Aithurus M. Illias	Ind 2	33	47	35	58	38	25	47	1	284	0.06%
Lal Perera	ONF	39	69	33	43	21	38	37	3	283	0.06%
Vikramabahu Karunaratne	LF	25	46	14	33	33	15	25	8	199	0.04%
M. K. Shivajilingam	Ind 5	28	38	12	26	17	11	20	2	154	0.03%
Battaramulla Seelarathana	JP	20	28	11	30	15	4	11	6	125	0.03%
Wije Dias	SEP	15	20	8	21	17	18	12	1	112	0.02%
Aruna de Soyza	RPP	19	38	7	15	12	10	6	0	107	0.02%
Senaratna de Silva	PNF	15	21	9	16	10	11	13	2	97	0.02%
Sanath Pinnaduwa	NA	14	21	5	14	8	10	10	0	82	0.02%
M. Mohamed Musthaffa	Ind 4	15	15	6	13	12	8	11	1	81	0.02%
M.B. Thaminimulla	ACAKO	13	15	5	12	4	7	9	1	66	0.01%
Sarath Kongahage	UNAF	11	13	8	8	8	3	4	1	56	0.01%
Valid Votes		67,519	65,613	54,372	64,522	58,365	61,642	64,254	15,642	451,929	100.00%
Rejected Votes		449	624	308	452	364	367	333	128	3,025	
Total Polled		67,968	66,237	54,680	64,974	58,729	62,009	64,587	15,770	454,954	
Registered Electors		87,510	86,311	74,601	85,686	77,705	80,334	86,711		578,858	
Turnout		77.67%	76.74%	73.30%	75.83%	75.58%	77.19%	74.49%		78.60%	

== 2010 Parliamentary General Election ==
Results of the 14th parliamentary election held on 8 April 2010 for the district:

Party	Votes per Polling Division							Postal Votes	Total Votes	%	Seats
Party	Akur- essa	Deni- yaya	Devi- nuwara	Hak- mana	Kambur -upitiya	Matara	Weli- gama	Postal Votes	Total Votes	%	Seats
United People's Freedom Alliance (SLFP et al.)	30,816	30,270	26,177	33,113	28,834	24,353	29,814	10,560	213,937	65.31%	6
United National Front (UNP, SLMC, DPF, SLFP(P))	13,196	12,737	9,535	9,971	10,277	19,875	12,482	3,041	91,114	27.81%	2
Democratic National Alliance (JVP et al.)	3,075	1,960	3,086	2,212	2,257	3,624	2,812	1,439	20,465	6.25%	0
Sri Lanka National Front	86	40	51	17	142	57	62	23	478	0.15%	0
Independent 5	51	54	25	48	34	32	33	1	278	0.08%	0
Our National Front	39	51	21	48	50	19	30	3	261	0.08%	0
United Socialist Party	37	50	45	25	28	28	23	4	240	0.07%	0
National Development Front	17	32	30	33	25	21	18	4	180	0.05%	0
United Democratic Front	26	33	14	24	17	16	15	5	150	0.05%	0
Left Liberation Front	4	2	8	0	2	5	101	4	126	0.04%	0
Tamil Makkal Viduthalai Pulikal	22	3	0	4	3	8	8	1	49	0.01%	0
Independent 4	3	16	4	8	4	2	3	2	42	0.01%	0
Patriotic National Front	2	13	5	4	6	5	2	0	37	0.01%	0
Independent 1	6	6	1	7	6	3	6	0	35	0.01%	0
Janasetha Peramuna	3	6	2	4	6	9	3	0	33	0.01%	0
Independent 3	6	6	1	5	4	2	5	1	30	0.01%	0
Liberal Party	7	5	6	4	1	5	1	1	30	0.01%	0
National People's Party	1	5	3	3	4	4	10	0	30	0.01%	0
Independent 2	5	7	2	2	4	1	3	1	25	0.01%	0
Sri Lanka Labour Party	2	2	1	1	10	3	4	0	23	0.01%	0
Sinhalaye Mahasammatha Bhoomiputra Pakshaya	3	2	2	2	4	2	1	3	19	0.01%	0
Valid Votes	47,407	45,300	39,019	45,535	41,718	48,074	45,436	15,093	327,582	100.00%	8
Rejected Votes	2,170	2,718	1,473	2,572	1,906	1,299	1,812	339	14,289		
Total Polled	49,577	48,018	40,492	48,107	43,624	49,373	47,248	15,432	341,871		
Registered Electors	87,510	86,311	74,601	85,686	77,705	80,334	86,711		578,858		
Turnout	56.65%	55.63%	54.28%	56.14%	56.14%	61.46%	54.49%		59.06%		

The following candidates were elected: Sanath Jayasuriya (UPFA), 74,352 preference votes (pv); Mahinda Yapa Abeywardena (UPFA-SLFP), 70,439 pv; Lakshman Yapa Abeywardena (UPFA), 67,510 pv; Buddhika Pathirana (UNF), 62,499 pv; Mangala Samaraweera (UNF-SLFP(P)), 59,836 pv; Chandrasiri Gajadeera (UPFA-CPSL), 51,742 pv; Hemal Gunasekara (UPFA), 51,013 pv; and Wijaya Dahanayaka (UPFA), 44,463 pv.
