= List of mayors of Galle =

The Mayor of Galle is the head of Galle Municipal Council and his office is located at the Galle Town Hall.

== List of mayors ==
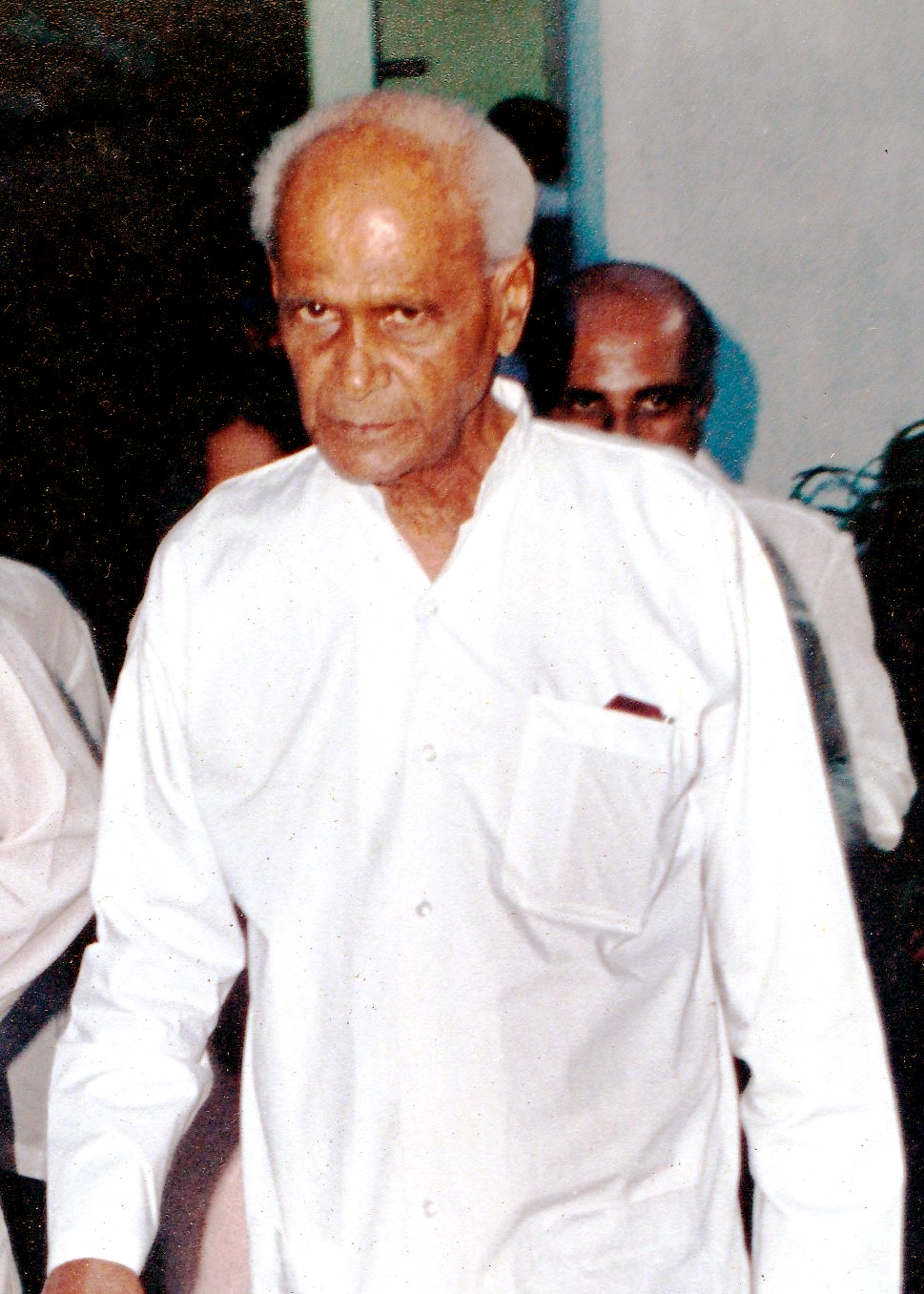
Former prime minister Wijeyananda Dahanayake was the first mayor.

The following were the Mayor of Galle:

Name	Date of office	Notes
Wijeyananda Dahanayake	1939-41	First Mayor of Galle and Prime Minister of Ceylon (1959–60)
A. I. H. A. Wahab	1942-43	First Muslim Mayor of Galle; High Commissioner to Ghana
Don Samuel Goonasekera	1944	Member for Udugama (1947-52), Member for Habaraduwa (1960-64) Minister of Labour, Cultural Affairs and Social Services
W. T. Wijekulasuriya	1945	High Commissioner to Kenya
E. D. Nagahawatta	1946	
W. T. Wijekulasuriya	1947-49	
A. R. M. Thassim	1950-51	The longest-serving mayor of Galle
W. T. Wijekulasuriya	1952-53	
A. R. M. Thassim	1954-62	
W. D. S. Abeygoonawardena	1966-69	Member of Parliament for Galle
D. P. Wijenarayana	1970-1971	Ambassador of Sri Lanka to the Union of Myanmar (1982–86)
B. P. Wijenarayana	1972-74	
S. C. C. R. Koolathilak	1974	
A. G. Goonarathne	1979-83	
A. H. M. Anwar	1983-88	nephew of Al-Haj A. R. M. Thassim
T. Darlin de Silva	1988-91	
Wijaya Dahanayake	1991-97	Deputy Minister of Public Administration and Home Affairs and Member of Parliament for Matara
Lionel Premasiri	1997-2001	Member for Galle District (2004–10) and deputy minister of Social Services and Social Welfare
Mansoor Marikar	2001-02	
Lionel Premasiri	2002-2004	
Ismail Mohamed Ariff	2004-06	
Weeranarayana Kelum Seneviratne	2006–November 2008	At the local government elections in 2006 Seneviratne and de Silva both received an equal number (5,998) preferences each and subsequently agreed to share the office of Mayor, with Seneviratne becoming mayor for the first two years.
Alexendar Methsiri de Silva	November 2008–January 2013	At the 2011 local government elections de Silva was formally elected as mayor. In January 2013 the Chief Minister of Southern Province, Shan Wijayalal De Silva formally removed de Silva from the office of mayor.
Weeranarayana Kelum Seneviratne	January 2013–June 2014	Following the removal of de Silva the deputy mayor, Seneviratne, was appointed as mayor.
Alexandar Methsiri de Silva	June 2014–May 2015	In June 2014 the Galle High Court revoked the Chief Minister's decision to remove de Silva as mayor and he was re-instated.
Weeranarayana Kelum Seneviratne	May 2015–March 2018	In May 2015 the Court of Appeal annulled the Galle High Court's decision and Seneviratne was appointed as mayor.
Priyantha Godagama Sahabandu	March 2018–2023	Subsequent to the 2018 Sri Lankan local elections, in a secret ballot held on 23 March 2018, Sahabandu was elected to the position of mayor obtaining 20 votes to 11 over his rival candidate.
Halvitigala Ihala Gamage Sunil	20 June– Present	Following the 2025 Sri Lankan local elections, Galle MC voted 19–17 for a secret ballot. NPP's Halvitigala Ihala Gamage Sunil was elected Mayor with 19 votes.
