= Hiniduma Electoral District =

Electoral district of Sri Lanka (1960-1989)

Hiniduma electoral district was an electoral district of Sri Lanka between March 1960 and February 1989. The district was named after the town of Hiniduma in Galle District, Southern Province. The 1978 Constitution of Sri Lanka introduced the proportional representation electoral system for electing members of Parliament. The existing 160 mainly single-member electoral districts were replaced with 22 multi-member electoral districts. Hiniduma electoral district was replaced by the Galle multi-member electoral district at the 1989 general elections.

== Members of Parliament ==
Key

Independent SLFP UNP

Election	Member	Party	Term
1960 (March)	M. S. Amarasiri	Mahajana Eksath Peramuna	
1960 (July)	H. W. Dissanayake	Sri Lanka Freedom Party	
1965	M. S. Amarasiri	United National Party	
1970	H. W. Dissanayake	Sri Lanka Freedom Party	
1977	M. S. Amarasiri	United National Party	

== Elections ==
=== 1960 (March) Parliamentary General Election ===
Results of the 4th parliamentary election held on 19 March 1960:

Candidate	Party	Symbol	Votes	%
M. S. Amarasiri	Mahajana Eksath Peramuna	Cart Wheel	4,173	24.52%
A. Samarawickrema	United National Party	Elephant	3,229	18.85
E. D. Wickramathilaka	Ceylon Workers' Congress	Cockerel	2,465	14.40
H. W. Dissanayake	Sri Lanka Freedom Socialist Party	Sun	2,388	13.95
H. L. Illeperumachchi	Lanka Sama Samaja Party	Key	1,881	10.98
C. D. A Gunawardene	Lanka Democratic Party	Umbrella	1,468	8.57
S. D. Samarasekera	Independent	Rabbit	743	4.34
A. S. Gunasekera	Sri Lanka Freedom Party	Hand	670	3.91
Valid Votes			17,017	99.38
Rejected Votes			107	0.62
Total Polled			17,124	100.00
Registered Electors			21,360	
Turnout				80.17%

=== 1960 (July) Parliamentary General Election ===
Results of the 5th parliamentary election held on 20 July 1960:

Candidate	Party	Symbol	Votes	%
H. W. Dissanayake	Sri Lanka Freedom Party	Hand	7,610	48.02
P. L. Sumanadasa	United National Party	Elephant	4,172	26.32
M. S. Amarasiri	Mahajana Eksath Peramuna	Cart Wheel	3,697	23.33
D. P. Edirisinghe	Independent	Rabbit	299	1.89
Valid Votes			15,778	99.55
Rejected Votes			71	0.45
Total Polled			15,849	100.00
Registered Electors			21,360	
Turnout				74.20

=== 1965 Parliamentary General Election ===
Results of the 6th parliamentary election held on 22 March 1965:

Candidate	Party	Symbol	Votes	%
M. S. Amarasiri	United National Party	Hand	11,755	50.66
H. W. Dissanayake	Sri Lanka Freedom Party	Elephant	11,193	48.24
N. L. L. Mathrudasa	Mahajana Eksath Peramuna	Cart Wheel	150	0.65
Valid Votes			23,098	99.54
Rejected Votes			105	0.46
Total Polled			23,205	100.00
Registered Electors			26,882	
Turnout				86.32

=== 1970 Parliamentary General Election ===
Results of the 7th parliamentary election held on 27 May 1970:

Candidate	Party	Symbol	Votes	%
H. W. Dissanayake	Sri Lanka Freedom Party	Hand	16,779	59.36
M. S. Amarasiri	United National Party	Elephant	11,092	39.24
D. P. Edirisinghe	Independent	Bell	251	0.89
Valid Votes			28,122	99.49
Rejected Votes			143	0.51
Total Polled			28,265	100.00
Registered Electors			32,011	
Turnout				89.30

=== 1977 Parliamentary General Election ===
Results of the 8th parliamentary election held on 21 July 1977:

Candidate	Party	Symbol	Votes	%
M. S. Amarasiri	United National Party	Elephant	26,140	61.77
H. W. Dissanayake	Sri Lanka Freedom Party	Hand	15,111	35.71
P. Alahapperuma	Communist Party of Sri Lanka	Star	575	1.36
K. J. A. Hinniappuhamy	Lanka Sama Samaja Party (Revolutionary)	Lamp	150	0.35
H. Abeywickrama	Lanka Democratic Party	Umbrella	132	0.31
L. Ratnapala	Independent	Tree	111	0.26
Valid Votes			42,219	99.76
Rejected Votes			102	0.24
Total Polled			42,321	100.00
Registered Electors			47,132	
Turnout				89.79
