= Amarasiri =

Amarasiri is a Sinhalese name that may refer to the following notable people:

Given name

- Amarasiri Dodangoda (1941–2009), Sri Lankan politician
- Amarasiri Kalansuriya (born 1940), Sri Lankan film actor
- Amarasiri Peiris (born 1946), Sri Lankan singer

Surname

- Aloka Amarasiri (born 1989), Sri Lankan cricketer
- Sirisena Amarasiri (1925–2007), Sri Lankan politician
