= Hiniduma =

Hiniduma may refer to:

- Hiniduma Sunil Senevi, Sri Lankan politician and government minister
- Hiniduma Polling Division, Southern Province, Sri Lanka
- Hiniduma Electoral District, electoral district of Sri Lanka 1960–1989
