= H. W. Dissanayake =

Sri Lankan politician (1924–1985)

Hon. H. W. Dissanayake

Member of Parliament

Member of the Ceylon Parliament for Hiniduma
- In office July 1960 – 1965
- Preceded by: M. S. Amarasiri
- Succeeded by: M. S. Amarasiri
- In office 1970–1977
- Preceded by: M. S. Amarasiri
- Succeeded by: M. S. Amarasiri

Personal details
- Born: Henry William Dissanayake; 3 February 1924
- Died: 1985 (aged 60–61)
- Party: Sri Lanka Freedom Party
- Spouse: Milani née Hettiarachchi
- Children: Thiranjani (Tina), Suren (Gnanapriya)
- Education: Yatalawatte Government School, Richmond College, Galle, Ceylon Law College
- Occupation: Politics
- Profession: Lawyer

Henry William Dissanayake (3 February 1924 – 1985) was a Sri Lankan politician.

Henry William Dissanayake was born on 3 February 1924 and received his early education at the Yatalawatte Government School, and at Richmond College, Galle. In 1947 whilst at Richmond College he led the delegation of All-Ceylon Buddhist Students' Union before the Special Committee on Education. After finishing school Dissanayake entered the Government Clerical Service and was the secretary of the G.C.S.U. (Galle) from 1948 to 1950. He resigned to enter Ceylon Law College, passing out as a Proctor. While at Law College he was the secretary of the Political Society.

At the 4th General Parliamentary elections in March 1960 he contested the seat of Hiniduma on behalf of the Sri Lanka Freedom Party losing to Ceylonese parliamentary election, 1965 by 1,785 votes. As the March Election left neither party with a majority a subsequent election was held in July that year. At the July elections Dissanayake re-contested Hiniduma however this time for the Sri Lanka Freedom Party and was successful, receiving 48% (7,610) of the votes.

At the parliamentary elections in 1965 he was narrowly defeated by 542 votes by the United National Party candidate, Amarasiri. He successfully re-contested the seat at the 1970 elections, winning against rival Amarasiri by over 5,500 votes. He failed to hold the seat at the 8th Parliamentary election held in July 1977, losing to Amarasiri by 11,000 votes.

Dissanayake died in 1985. His wife, Malini, died in 2012.
