= Wijeyananda Dahanayake =

Sri Lankan politician (1902–1997)

Hon. Wijeyananda Dahanayake
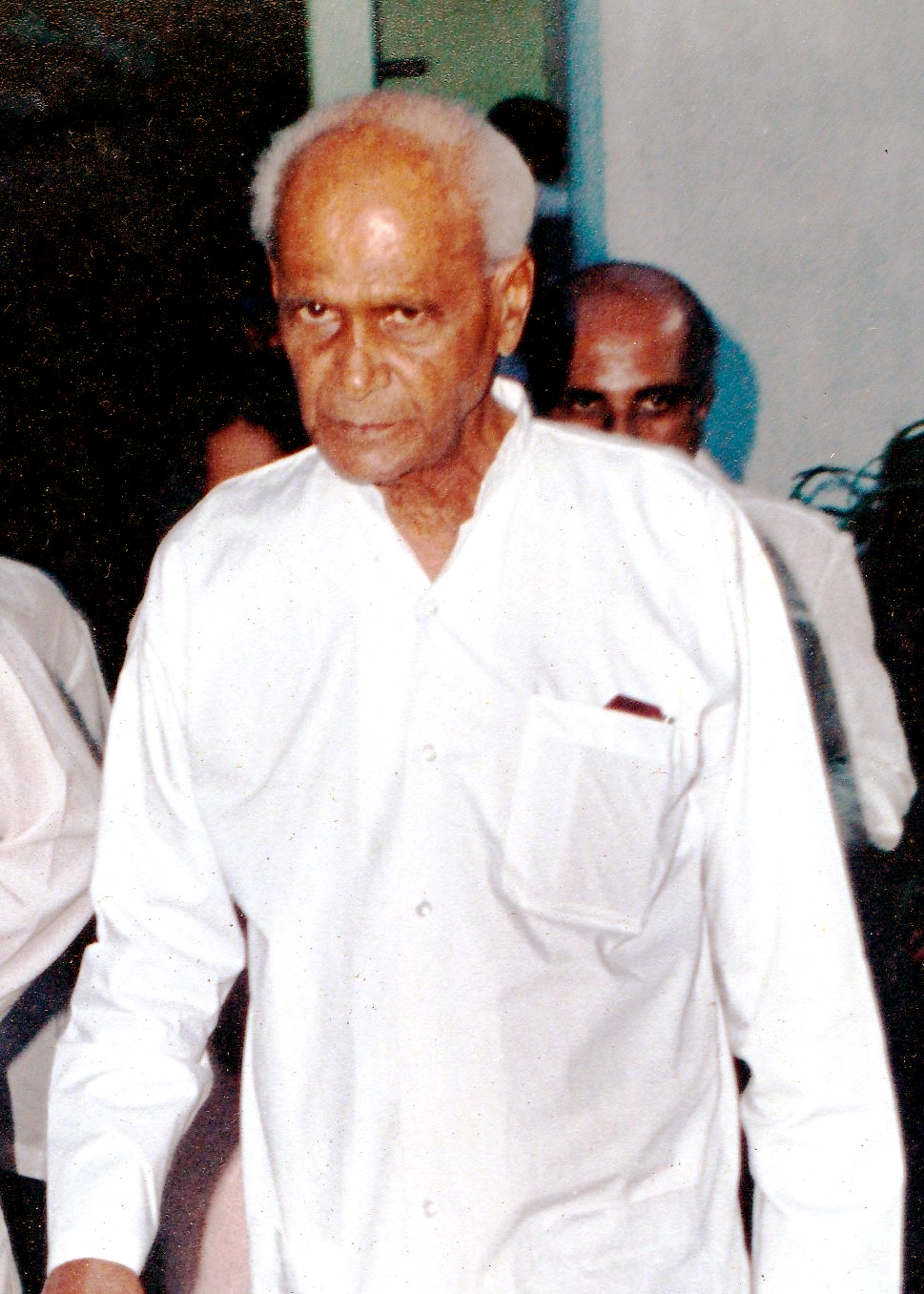

5th Prime Minister of Ceylon
- In office 26 September 1959 – 20 March 1960
- Monarch: Elizabeth II
- Governor General: Oliver Ernest Goonetilleke
- Preceded by: S. W. R. D. Bandaranaike
- Succeeded by: Dudley Senanayake

Minister of Home Affairs
- In office 1965–1970
- Prime Minister: Dudley Senanayake
- Preceded by: Maithripala Senanayake
- Succeeded by: Felix Dias Bandaranaike

Minister of Education
- In office 1956–1959
- Prime Minister: S. W. R. D. Bandaranaike
- Preceded by: M. D. Banda
- Succeeded by: Bernard Aluwihare

Member of Parliament for Galle
- In office 1979 – 20 December 1988
- Preceded by: Albert de Silva
- Succeeded by: Constituency Abolished
- In office 1960 – 18 May 1977
- Preceded by: W. D. S. Abeygoonawardena
- Succeeded by: Albert de Silva
- In office 1947 – 5 December 1959
- Preceded by: Constituency Created
- Succeeded by: W. D. S. Abeygoonawardena

Personal details
- Born: 22 October 1902 Galle, British Ceylon
- Died: 4 May 1997 (aged 94) Galle, Sri Lanka
- Party: Sinhala Language Front; Ceylon Democratic Party; Sri Lanka Freedom Socialist Party
- Other political affiliations: Bolshevik–Leninist Party; Lanka Sama Samaja Party; Mahajana Eksath Peramuna; Sri Lanka Freedom Party; United National Party
- Education: S. Thomas' College, Mount Lavinia, Richmond College, Galle
- Occupation: Politician
- Profession: Teacher
- Nickname: Bannis Mama

Wijeyananda Dahanayake (Sinhala: විජයානන්ද දහනායක; Tamil: விஜயானந்த தகநாயக்கா; 22 October 1902 – 4 May 1997) was a Sri Lankan politician. He was the Prime Minister of Ceylon from September 1959 to March 1960.

Born as one of the twin children to a conservative family in Galle, Don Wijeyananda Dahanayake was educated at Richmond College, Galle and S. Thomas' College, Mount Lavinia. He became a teacher at St. Aloysius' College, Galle before entering active politics having been elected to the Galle Municipal Council in 1939 as a leftist and served as Mayor of Galle. In 1944, he was elected to the State Council of Ceylon and was thereafter elected to the House of Representatives. He served as the member of parliament from Galle from 1947 to 1977, with a brief interval in 1960. In 1956, he was appointed to the Cabinet of Ministers as the minister of education. He unexpectedly succeeded S. W. R. D. Bandaranaike as prime minister when the latter was assassinated on 26 September 1959. His tenure as the caretaker prime minister was short as he was unable to keep together the alliance formed by Bandaranaike. He dismissed the Cabinet of Ministers and called for fresh elections, for which he formed his own party. Although he lost his parliamentary seat in the 1960 March elections, he regained it in the general election that followed two months later. Sitting in the opposition from 1960 to 1965, he served as Minister of Home Affairs from 1965 to 1970 and again sat in opposition from 1970 to 1977. He then served as Minister of Co-operatives from 1986 to 1988. He is noted for having contested from almost every major party of his time and has the record for the longest speech in parliament, lasting thirteen and half hours.

== Early life and education ==
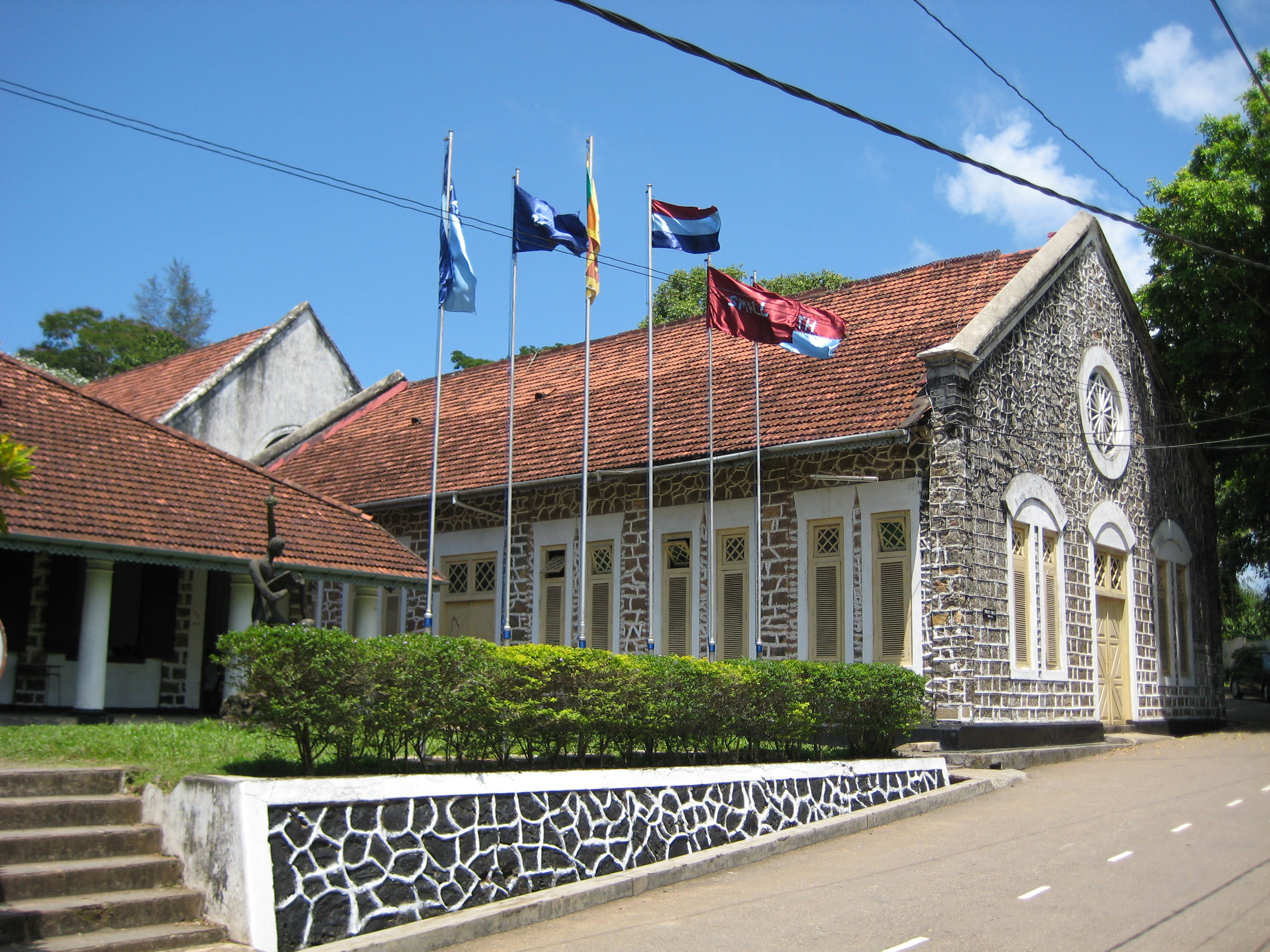
The young Wijeyananda Dahanayaka attended the well known Richmond College, in Galle, Sri Lanka.

He was born as a twin in Dangedera, Richmond Hill, Galle and was named Don Wijeyananda Dahanayake after the Wijayananda Pirivena. His father was Don Dionesius Panditha Sepala Dahanayake, was a Muhandiram, who later served as the Kackckeri Mudliyar of Galle and was a scholar in oriental languages. His twin brother was Kalyanapriya Dahanayake.

Dahanayake received his education first at Rippon Girls' School, Galle] and then at the Government English Training School on Thurstan Road, Colombo; before moving to Richmond College, Galle and S. Thomas' College, Mount Lavinia for his secondary education.

== Teaching career ==
He joined the teaching staff of St. Aloysius' College, Galle, where he taught English, mathematics, history and geography and received training at the teaching college in Maharagama. In addition he coached the college athletics and the junior cricket teams and organized the English Literary Union and the Debating Society. He also organized student protests against the British colonial administration.

== Political career ==
=== Early years ===
Dahanayake became active in pre-independence politics while serving as a teacher and switched to full-time politics. As a member of the Trotskyite Lanka Sama Samaja Party, he was elected to the Galle Municipal Council from the Kumbalwella Ward, which he held until 1944. He was elected the first Mayor of Galle in 1939 and served till 1941. When World War II started in the far-east, the Lanka Sama Samaja Party refused to support the British war effort. Dahanayake was prosecuted by the police for organising a strike during the height of war, which angered the British colonial administration. He represented himself in court without a lawyer and won against the crown prosecution.

=== State Council ===
He contested in a by-election to the State Council of Ceylon in 1944 from Bibile. Even though he lost to the bus magnate S. A. Peiris, he filed an election petition against his opponent and unseated him. He once again represented himself in court without a lawyer. In the following by-election, Dahanayake was elected to the State Council from Bibile. That year, when the Lanka Sama Samaja Party split, he joined the Bolshevik–Leninist Party led by Dr Colvin R. de Silva. He supported the education reforms initiated by C. W. W. Kannangara by collecting a large number of signatures for a public petition in support of the reforms that ushered equal opportunities for education for all children in the island. In 1947, he was only one of three members who voted against the Soulbury Constitution which enabled self rule for Ceylon as an independent Dominion inside the British Commonwealth.

=== Parliament ===
He contested the 1947 general elections from the Bolshevik–Leninist Party in the Galle electorate. With a campaign in which he did not spend any money, he won against the wealthy H. W. Amarasuriya contesting from the United National Party and was elected to the House of Representatives. In parliament, he gave a thirteen and half-hour speech during the first budget speech, which is the record for the longest speech. He later re-joined the Lanka Sama Samaja Party under Dr N. M. Perera and successfully contested the 1952 general elections from the Lanka Sama Samaja Party and retained his seat. He was expelled from the party for hosting a reception for the Prime Minister Dudley Senanayake's visit to Galle.

In 1955, he gave leadership to the nationalist movement that sought for "Sinhala only" under a new party called the "Basha Peramuna" (Language Front) which aligned with the alliance Mahajana Eksath Peramuna (Peoples United Front) led by S. W. R. D. Bandaranaike which contested the 1956 general elections and won a landslide victory against the ruling United National Party which was reduced to eight seats in parliament. Dahanayake was himself re-elected from Galle having joined the Sri Lanka Freedom Party.

=== Minister of education ===
With S. W. R. D. Bandaranaike becoming prime minister, Dahanayake was appointed Minister of Education by Bandaranaike. As Education Minister he re-introduced the mid-day school meal for students by providing a free bun, which gained him the nickname "Bannis Mama" (Bun Uncle). He gave university status to the Vidyodaya Pirivena and Vidyalankara Pirivena.

In 1959, he became the acting leader of the house after the incumbent C. P. de Silva was taken to London for medical treatment after becoming ill after consuming a glass of milk at a cabinet meeting.

=== Prime Minister of Ceylon ===
Bandaranaike had been scheduled to go to New York to attend the UN General Assembly in late September 1959. With the absence of C. P. de Silva, Bandaranaike had sent a letter to the Governor-General of Ceylon recommending that he appoint Dahanayake as acting prime minister during his absence. Bandaranaike was assassinated on 26 September 1959 and with the letter as a reference, Sir Oliver Goonetilleke, the Governor General of Ceylon appointed Dahanayake as prime minister. He was later confirmed by parliament in this position. He also took on the portfolios of defence and external affairs (customary held by the Prime Minister) as well as education. His tenure as prime minister was controversial and difficult. The first major test came when the opposition in the House of Representatives moved a vote of no confidence against his government on 30 October 1959, which the government survived by a narrow margin of 48 votes to 43. Even before Bandaranaike's assassination, there was infighting among the alliance parties of the Mahajana Eksath Peramuna. The situation deteriorated under Dahanayake, which was compounded by the investigation into the assassination which drew suspicion on several ministers and resulted their resignation or removal. Dahanayake made a sudden request to the Governor-General of Ceylon for the dissolution of parliament on 5 December 1959 calling for fresh elections. On 7 December, he announced his intentions to resign from the Sri Lanka Freedom Party. The Party in turn refused his resignation and instead expelled him. Dahanayake then responded with dismissing Cabinet Ministers from the Freedom Party. For the interim he ran the country with a five member cabinet. He formed Lanka Prajathanthravadi Pakshaya (Ceylon Democratic Party) from which he contested the March 1960 general elections from Galle which he lost to W. D. S. Abeygoonawardena by 400 votes. His party fielded 101 candidates, but only four managed to secure seats in Parliament. His most notable achievement during his tenure was the repeal of the suspension of the Capital Punishment Act which Bandaranaike had earlier imposed. The repeal made way for the execution of those convicted of the assassination of Bandaranaike.

=== Return to parliament ===
He successfully contested the July 1960 general elections from the Lanka Prajathanthravadi Pakshaya in Galle and was elected to parliament defeating W. D. S. Abeygoonawardena. Dahanayake took his seat in the opposition and, in 1963, was called before the Commission of Inquiry into the assassination of S.W.R.D. Bandaranaike to give evidence. That same year he was awarded an honorary doctorate from the Vidyodaya University and subsequently adopted the title "Dr. Wijeyananda Dahanayake". In 1964, Dahanayake attracted national attention when he attempted to enter the Parliament chambers wearing only a span cloth (known locally as an amude) to protest the government of Prime Minister Sirima Bandaranaike, which had imposed textile rationing—limiting citizens to just two yards of fabric per month—due to a foreign exchange shortage. He was prevented from entering the chamber, but photographs of Dahanayake in his amude appeared in newspapers the following day, making the incident widely publicized.

=== Cabinet minister and opposition ===
He was re-elected 1965 general elections as a member of the Sri Lanka Freedom Socialist Party led by C. P. de Silva. The party supported the United National Party in forming a national government and Dahanayake was appointed Minister of Home Affairs. He was re-elected in the 1970 general elections from the United National Party and sat in the opposition. He resigned from United National Party and sat as an independent after his request for a free vote for the republican constitution was refused. In the 1977 general elections, he contested from Galle as an independent candidate, but lost to the United National Party candidate Albert de Silva. He subsequently filed an election petition challenging the result in the Galle High Court and later in the Supreme Court, representing himself in both cases. In 1979, the court ruled in his favor, unseating Silva. In the ensuing by-election, Dahanayake contested as the UNP candidate and won by a majority of 13,012 votes, returning to Parliament as a backbencher. He was appointed Minister of Co-operatives by President J. R. Jayewardene in March 1986, a position he held until 1988. The United National Party nominated Dahanayake through the National List for the 1989 general elections, his name was removed later and he was not able to enter parliament. This marked the end of his political career.

== Death ==
Dahanayaka died on 4 May 1997 at the age of 94 after a short illness at his home in Richmond Hill, Galle.

== Personal life ==
Dahanayake was known for his simplicity and modest lifestyle. Upon being appointed prime minister, he moved into Temple Trees carrying his personal belongings in just two old suitcases from his room at Srawasthi Mandiraya. Finding the Prime Minister’s bedroom too large for his taste, he had it partitioned to make it more modest. After his electoral defeat and subsequent resignation from the post of prime minister, Dahanayake once again packed his belongings into the same two suitcases and left Temple Trees for Galle. He remained a bachelor throughout his life.

== Electoral history ==
Electoral history of Wijeyananda Dahanayake
Election	Constituency	Party	Votes	Result
1947 parliamentary	Galle	Bolshevik–Leninist Party	16,588	Elected
1952 parliamentary	Galle	Lanka Sama Samaja Party	17,897	Elected
1956 parliamentary	Galle	Mahajana Eksath Peramuna	21,971	Elected
1960 (March) parliamentary	Galle	Lanka Prajathanthravadi Pakshaya	9,997	Not elected
1960 (July) parliamentary	Galle	Lanka Prajathanthravadi Pakshaya	10,902	Elected
1965 parliamentary	Galle	Sri Lanka Freedom Socialist Party	18,416	Elected
1970 parliamentary	Galle	United National Party	16,940	Elected
1977 parliamentary	Galle	Nationalities Unity Organisation	10,852	Not elected
1979 parliamentary by	Galle	United National Party	13,012	Elected

Government offices
Preceded by S. W. R. D. Bandaranaike	Prime Minister of Ceylon; 1959–1960	Succeeded by Dudley Senanayake
