= National Institute of Fundamental Studies =

Research institute in Sri Lanka

Coordinates: 07°17′02″N 80°37′56″E

National Institute of Fundamental Studies (NIFS)
- Founder: Cyril Ponnamperuma
- Established: 1981 Institute of Fundamental Studies (IFS); 2014 National Institute of Fundamental Studies(NIFS)
- Chair: Prof. Sanath Rajapakse
- Endowment: Ministry of Higher Education, Technology and Innovations
- Formerly called: Institute of Fundamental Studies (IFS)
- Address: Hantana Road, Kandy, Sri Lanka
- Location: Kandy, Sri Lanka, Kandy, Sri Lanka
- Website: www.nifs.ac.lk

The National Institute of Fundamental Studies (NIFS) (Sinhala: ජාතික මූලික අධ්‍යන ආයතනය) is a government multidisciplinary research institute in Sri Lanka, established in 1981. The NIFS is the only Institute in Sri Lanka which exists for the sole purpose of conducting research in natural and social sciences and philosophy for national development and scientific advancement.

The NIFS is engaged in basic, high caliber research focusing on 16 different thematic research areas under 6 research departments. The research carried out at the NIFS is also initiated as a response to burning national problems in Sri Lanka.

Besides engaging in basic research, the NIFS popularizes science, especially among school children, trains postgraduate researchers in the country to prevent brain drain and disseminates scientific knowledge to the wider public.

A NIFS documentary on science and nature

== History ==
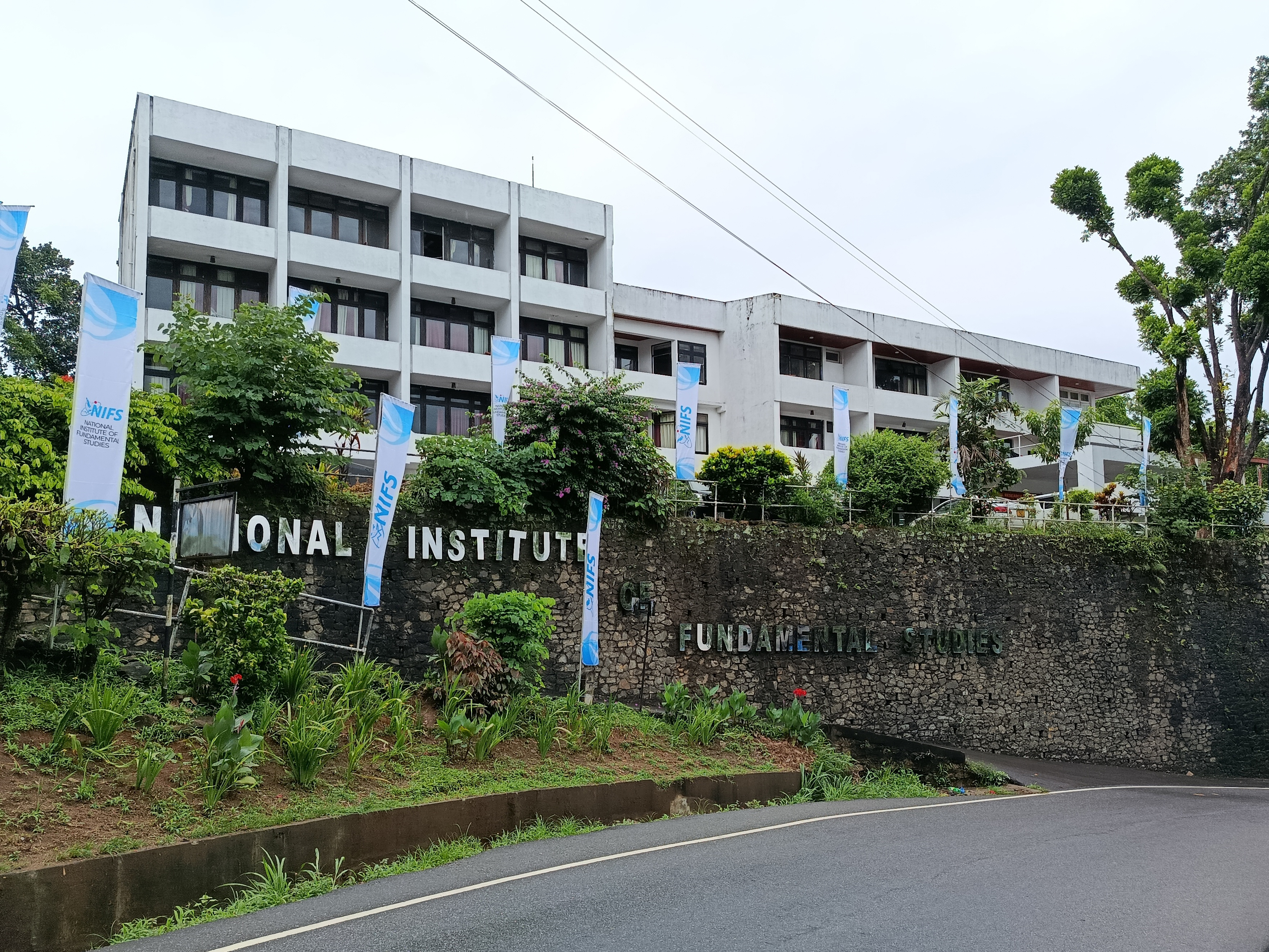
National Institute of Fundamental Studies.

NIFS was established in September 1981 by the Parliament Act No. 55 and shifted its location from Colombo to Kandy on 4 December 1985. Vidya Jyothi Professor Cyril Ponnamperuma was appointed as the director of the Institute of Fundamental Studies by President J. R. Jayewardena. He was instrumental in setting up the permanent home of the institute in the Hanthana Hills with a modern laboratory complex.

The name of the institute was changed to National Institute of Fundamental Studies (NIFS) Sri Lanka by the Act No. 25 of 2014.

== See also ==
- Science and technology in Sri Lanka
