= Galle Electoral District (1947–1989) =

Electoral district of Sri Lanka

Galle electoral district was an electoral district of Sri Lanka between August 1947 and February 1989. The district was named after the town of Galle in Galle District, Southern Province. The 1978 Constitution of Sri Lanka introduced the proportional representation electoral system for electing members of Parliament. The existing 160 mainly single-member electoral districts were replaced with 22 multi-member electoral districts. Galle electoral district was replaced by the Galle multi-member electoral district at the 1989 general elections, the first under the proportional representation system, Galle continues to be a polling division of the multi-member electoral district.

== Members of Parliament ==
Key

Independent SLFP UNP LSSP

Election	Member	Party	Term
1947	Wijeyananda Dahanayake	Bolshevik–Leninist Party	1947-1952
1952	Wijeyananda Dahanayake	Lanka Sama Samaja Party	1952-1956
1956	Wijeyananda Dahanayake	Mahajana Eksath Peramuna	1956-1960
1960 (March)	W. D. S. Abeygoonawardena	United National Party	1960
1960 (July)	Wijeyananda Dahanayake	Lanka Prajathanthravadi Pakshaya	1960-1965
1965	Wijeyananda Dahanayake	Sri Lanka Freedom Socialist Party	1965-1970
1970	Wijeyananda Dahanayake	United National Party	1970-1977
1977	Albert de Silva	United National Party	1977-1979
1979 by-election	Wijeyananda Dahanayake	United National Party	1979-1988

== Elections ==
=== 1947 Parliamentary General Election ===
Results of the 1st parliamentary election held between 23 August 1947 and 20 September 1947:

Candidate	Party	Symbol	Votes	%
Wijeyananda Dahanayake	Bolshevik–Leninist Party	Star	16,588	53.69
H. W. Amarasuriya	United National Party	Elephant	14,092	45.61
Valid Votes			30,680	99.30
Rejected Votes			214	0.70
Total Polled			30,894	100.00
Registered Electors			48,340	
Turnout				63.91

=== 1952 Parliamentary General Election ===
Results of the 2nd parliamentary election held between 24 May 1952 and 30 May 1952:

Candidate	Party	Symbol	Votes	%
Wijeyananda Dahanayake		Umbrella	17,897	56.87
Sumitta Dahanayake		Star	12,897	40.98
C. G. E. Bertram de Silva		Hand	479	1.52
Valid Votes			31,273	99.38
Rejected Votes			196	0.62
Total Polled			31,469	100.00
Registered Electors			43,765	
Turnout				71.90

=== 1956 Parliamentary General Election ===
Results of the 3rd parliamentary election held between 5 April 1956 and 10 April 1956:

Candidate	Party	Symbol	Votes	%
Wijeyananda Dahanayake		Hand	21,971	66.17
W. D. S. Abeygoonawardena	United National Party	Elephant	11,015	33.17
Valid Votes			32,986	99.34
Rejected Votes			218	0.66
Total Polled			33,204	100.00
Registered Electors			52,827	
Turnout				62.85

=== 1960 (March) Parliamentary General Election ===
Results of the 4th parliamentary election held on 19 March 1960:

Candidate	Party	Symbol	Votes	%
W. D. S. Abeygoonawardena	United National Party	Elephant	10,480	49.16
Wijeyananda Dahanayake		Umbrella	9,997	46.89
Vincent Wijenayake		Star	411	1.84
E. W. J. Serasinghe		Hand	250	1.17
A. M. Ismail		Eye	139	0.65
Valid Votes			21,277	99.80
Rejected Votes			42	0.20
Total Polled			21,319	100.00
Registered Electors			28,369	
Turnout				75.15

=== 1960 (July) Parliamentary General Election ===
Results of the 5th parliamentary election held on 20 July 1960:

Candidate	Party	Symbol	Votes	%
Wijeyananda Dahanayake		Umbrella	10,902	51.52
W. D. S. Abeygoonawardena	United National Party	Elephant	10,458	49.42
P. G. Somadasa		Cartwheel	251	1.19
Valid Votes			21,111	99.76
Rejected Votes			50	0.24
Total Polled			21,161	100.00
Registered Electors			28,369	
Turnout				74.59

=== 1965 Parliamentary General Election ===
Results of the 6th parliamentary election held on 22 March 1965:

Candidate	Party	Symbol	Votes	%
Wijeyananda Dahanayake		Sun	18,416	78.76
W. T. Wijekulasuriya		Hand	7,776	33.25
Valid Votes			23,194	99.19
Rejected Votes			191	
Total Polled			23,383	100.00
Registered Electors			33,785	
Turnout				69.21

=== 1970 Parliamentary General Election ===
Results of the 7th parliamentary election held on 27 May 1970:

Candidate	Party	Symbol	Votes	%
Wijeyananda Dahanayake	United National Party	Elephant	16,940	56.00
W. D. S. Abeygoonawardena	Sri Lanka Freedom Party	Hand	13,138	43.43
J. R. G. Abeywickreme	Janatha Vimukthi Peramuna	Bell	113	0.37
Valid Votes			30,191	99.81
Rejected Votes			57	1.89
Total Polled			30,248	100
Registered Electors			37,385	
Turnout				80.91

=== 1977 Parliamentary General Election ===
Results of the 8th parliamentary election held on 21 July 1977:

Candidate	Party	Symbol	Votes	%
Albert de Silva	United National Party	Elephant	15,861	42.32
Wijeyananda Dahanayake	Nationalities Unity Organisation	Umbrella	10,852	28.96
Raja Kulatilleke	Sri Lanka Freedom Party	Hand	6,448	17.21
Mansoor Marikkar	Lanka Sama Samaja Party	Key	4,314	11.51
Valid Votes			37,475	99.82
Rejected Votes			67	0.18
Total Polled			37,542	100.00
Registered Electors			45,100	
Turnout				83.24

=== 1979 Parliamentary by-Election ===
Results of the 1979 Sri Lankan parliamentary by-election held on 20 December 1979:

Candidate	Party	Symbol	Votes	%
Wijeyananda Dahanayake	United National Party	Elephant	22,377	62.05
Sarath Dias	Sri Lanka Freedom Party	Hand	9,365	25.97
Lionel Bopage	Janatha Vimukthi Peramuna	Bell	3,366	9.33
Ivan Victor Podi Athula	Lanka Sama Samaja Party	Key	634	1.76
Kiringoda Gamage Piyadasa		Umbrella	202	0.56
A.B.P. Perera		Lamp	116	0.32
Valid Votes			36,060	99.67
Rejected Votes			121	0.33
Total Polled			36,181	100.00
Registered Electors				
Turnout				
