= A. R. M. Thassim =

Ceylonese politician

Al-Haj A. R. M. Thassim OBE

Mayor of Galle
- In office 1950–1951
- Preceded by: W. T. Wijekulasooriya
- Succeeded by: W. T. Wijekulasooriya
- In office 1954–1962
- Preceded by: W. T. Wijekulasooriya
- Succeeded by: W. D. S. Abeygoonawardena

Personal details
- Born: Abdul Rahaman Mohamed Thassim; 26 September 1909 Katugoda, Galle, Ceylon
- Died: 1963 (age 54 years) Galle, Ceylon
- Spouse: Mariam Beebi
- Education: St. Aloysius' College, Galle
- Occupation: business owner

Al-Haj Abdul Rahaman Mohamed Thassim (26 September 1909 – 1963) was a Ceylonese businessman, philanthropist, politician and the longest serving mayor of Galle.

Thassim was born on 26 September 1909 in Katugoda, Galle, Ceylon. He was the youngest in a family of eight, with four older brothers: A. R. Mohamed, A. R. Abdul Hameed, A. R. Abdul Careem, and A. R. M. Haniffa; and three older sisters, Fathima Umma, Ravia Umma and Saudia Umma. He attended St. Aloysius' College, Galle.

In the early 1930s Thassim established A. R. Abdul Hameed & Bros, which operated a coconut and rubber mill in Galle. The company grew to become one of the largest rubber and coconut oil producers in the country, and was commonly known as 'Nugaduwa Mills'. The company owned a number of rubber and coconut plantations and manufactured a range of products, including textiles, confectionery, plastics and printing machinery. The family company is now known as Hameed Brothers and is managed by Thassim's nephew's son, Tufail.

In 1947 Thassim was elected to the Galle Municipal Council and served as mayor of Galle Council from 1950 to 1951 and from 1954 to 1962. In 1952 he funded the establishment of the Thassim Chest Clinic, the first tuberculosis centre built outside of Colombo.

In the 1951 New Year Honours he was made a Member of the British Empire (Civil Division) for his public services to Galle and in the 1955 Birthday Honours he was made an Officer of the Order of the British Empire (Civil Division) for his ongoing services to Galle.

Thassim died in 1963, aged 54.

His nephew, A. H. M. Anver, the son of Thassim’s older brother, A. R. Abdul Hameed, also served as mayor of Galle, between 1983 and 1988.

A. R. M. Thassim College, a primary school in Katugoda, is named after him.
