= D. V. J. Harischandra =

Dr D. V. J. Harischandra
- Born: Dikwelle Vidanage Jayaratna Harischandra; 11 March 1938; Mihiripanna Thalpe, Galle
- Died: 1 March 2013 (aged 74); Kalubowila, Colombo
- Education: St. Aloysius' College, Galle
- Occupation: Consultant psychiatrist
- Spouse: Padma Gunawardana
- Children: Neshantha, Tolusha and Navodya

Dikwelle Vidanage Jayaratna Harischandra (Sinhala: ඩි.වි.ජේ.හරිස්චන්ද්‍ර; 11 March 1938 – 1 March 2013) (known as D. V. J. Harischandra) was a Sri Lankan consultant psychiatrist, orator, author, Buddhist scholar and a senior lecturer attached to the University of Ruhuna. He was also Head of the Psychiatrist Study Division UOR and Chairmanship of the Psychiatric Medical Science Study Council of the Colombo Post Graduate Medical Institute. He took part in many Buddhist television discussion programmes and was a key resource contributor to Nanapahana (a programme to which he actively participated for about 13 years, transmitted on Teleshan Networks) and Doramandalawa on ITN.

== Early life ==
Harischandra was born on 11 March 1938 in Mihiripanna Thalpe Galle, a town in southwestern tip of Sri Lanka. He had his academic studies at St. Aloysius' College Galle. In 1964 Harischandra married Padma Gunawardana; they had three children, Neshantha Harischandra (Senior lecturer in English at UOR), Tolusha Harischandra (cardiothoracic specialist) and Navodya Harischandra (consultant psychiatrist)

== Death ==
Harischandra died on 1 March 2013 at the Kalubowila Teaching Hospital, where he had been admitted following a myocardial infarction.

== Bibliography ==
1. Psychiatric Aspects of Buddhist Jataka Stories 2ndedition Vijitha Yapa Publication 2016
2. Jataka Geetha Sangrahaya 2012 VYPublication
3. Budu dahama saha Vidyawa 2014 VYPublication
