= Pettigalawatta Grama Niladhari Division =

Pettigalawatta
- Grama Niladhari Division
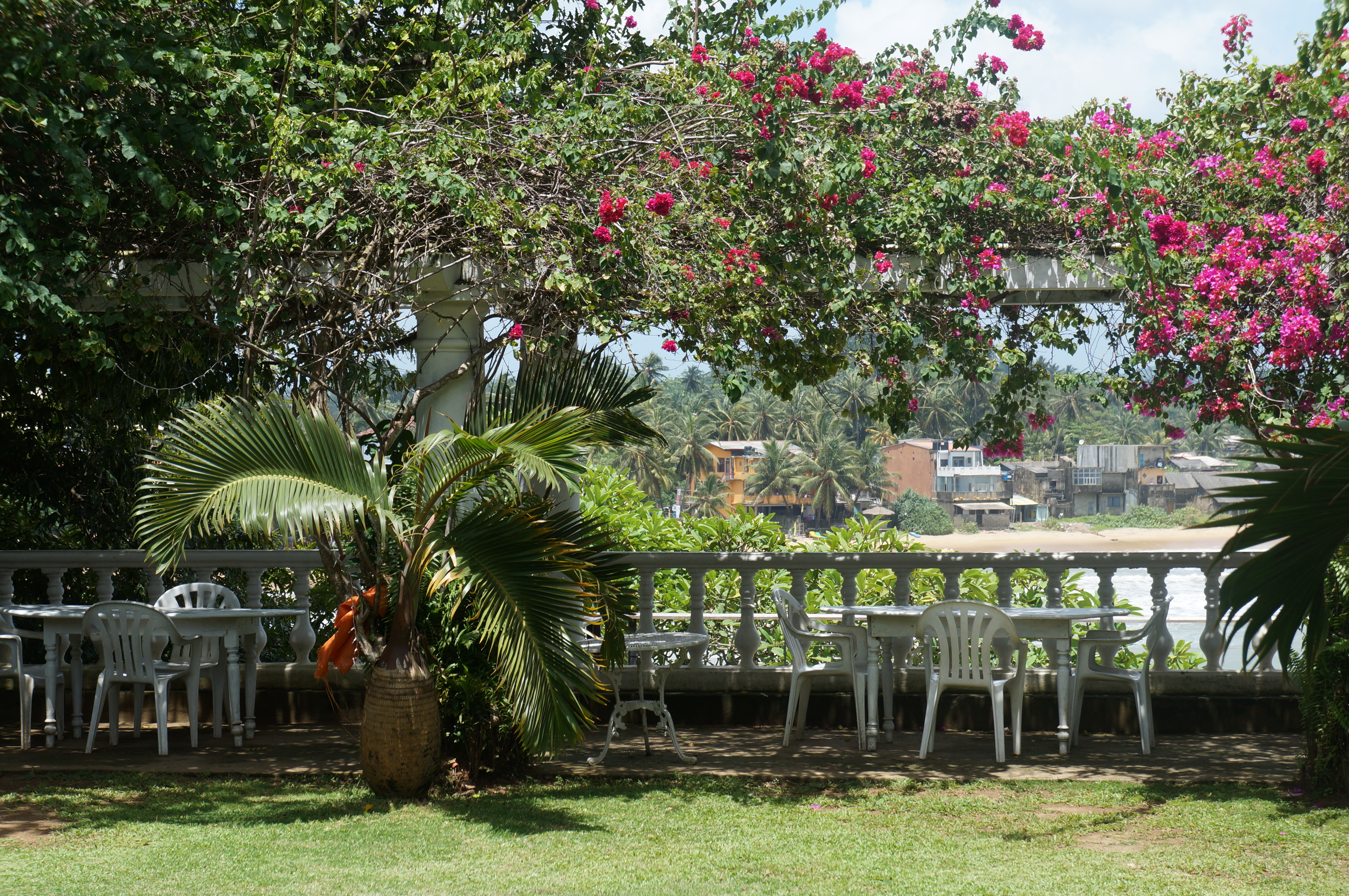
- Closenberg Hotel is located within, nearby or associated with the Pettigalawatta Grama Niladhari Division
- Interactive map of Pettigalawatta
- Coordinates: 6.037592°N 80.228131°E
- Country: Sri Lanka
- Province: Southern Province
- District: Galle District
- Divisional Secretariat: Galle Four Gravets Divisional Secretariat
- Electoral District: Galle Electoral District
- Polling Division: Galle Polling Division

Area
  - Total: 0.4 km^{2} (0.15 sq mi)
- Elevation: 90 m (300 ft)

Population (2012)
  - Total: 1,237
  - Density: 3,093/km^{2} (8,010/sq mi)
- ISO 3166 code: LK-3139195

Pettigalawatta

Pettigalawatta Grama Niladhari Division is a Grama Niladhari Division of the Galle Four Gravets Divisional Secretariat of Galle District of Southern Province, Sri Lanka. It has Grama Niladhari Division Code 99B.

Closenberg Hotel are located within, nearby or associated with Pettigalawatta.

Pettigalawatta is a surrounded by the Magalle, Makuluwa, Weliwatta and Thalapitiya Grama Niladhari Divisions.

== Demographics ==
=== Ethnicity ===
The Pettigalawatta Grama Niladhari Division has a Sinhalese majority (98.3%). In comparison, the Galle Four Gravets Divisional Secretariat (which contains the Pettigalawatta Grama Niladhari Division) has a Sinhalese majority (66.8%) and a significant Moor population (32.1%)

Ethnicity in Pettigalawatta
1. Sinhalese (98.3%)
2. Moor (1.30%)
3. Other (0.40%)

=== Religion ===
The Pettigalawatta Grama Niladhari Division has a Buddhist majority (96.5%). In comparison, the Galle Four Gravets Divisional Secretariat (which contains the Pettigalawatta Grama Niladhari Division) has a Buddhist majority (65.7%) and a significant Muslim population (32.3%)

Religion in Pettigalawatta
1. Buddhist (96.5%)
2. Muslim (1.50%)
3. Roman Catholic (1.30%)
4. Other (0.60%)

== Gallery ==
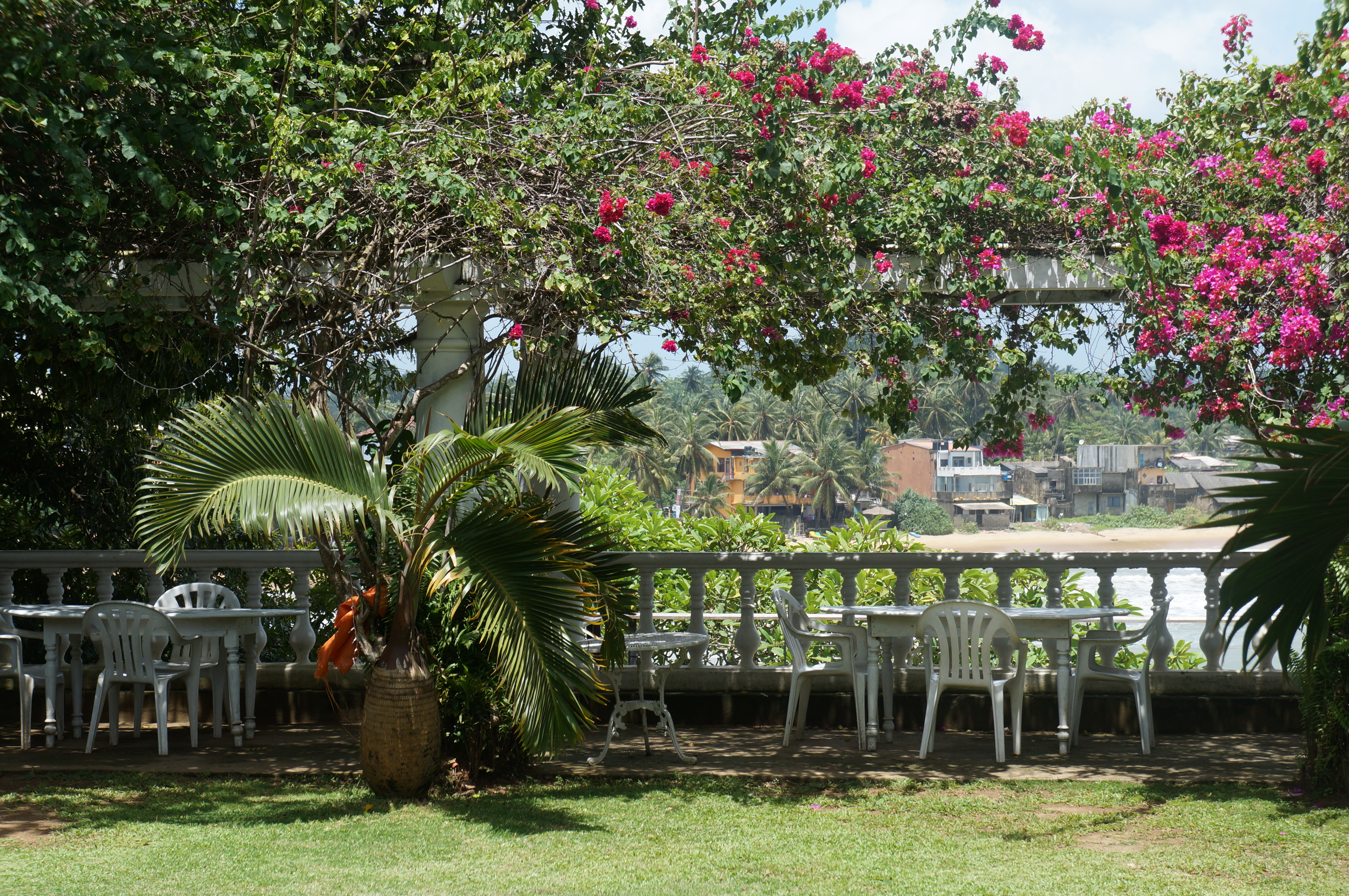
Closenberg Hotel
