= Lalith Jayaweera =

Sri Lankan aviation medicine specialist

Air Vice Marshal Lalith Jayaweera
- Born: Galle, Sri Lanka
- Military career
- Allegiance: Sri Lanka
- Branch: Sri Lanka Air Force
- Service years: 1994–present
- Rank: Air Vice Marshal
- Commands: Director General Health Services
- Conflicts: Sri Lankan Civil War
- Awards: Vishista Seva Vibhushanaya; Uttama Seva Padakkama

Lalith Rukman Jayaweera, VSV, USP, is a Sri Lankan aviation medicine physician, currently serving as the Director General Health Services of the Sri Lanka Air Force.

== Early life and education ==
Jayaweera was born in Galle, Sri Lanka, and received his primary education at St. Aloysius' College and secondary education at Richmond College, Galle. He obtained his MBBS degree from the University of Ruhuna and later earned an MSc in Defence and Strategic Studies from the General Sir John Kotelawala Defence University. He also holds two Diplomas in Aviation medicine from India and USA

== Career ==
Jayaweera joined the Sri Lanka Air Force on 3 April 1994 as a medical officer and has held several key positions throughout his career. These include serving as the Senior Staff Officer at the Directorate of Health Services, the Commanding Officer of SLAF Hospitals in Katunayake and Ratmalana, and as the Station Medical Officer at SLAF Stations in Colombo, Vavuniya, Chinabay, Palaly, and Hingurakgoda. He currently serves as the Director General Health Services, overseeing the medical services for SLAF personnel across the country. He serves as a visiting lecturer at the Medical Faculty of the Kotelawala Defence University and is also a Civil Aviation Medical Examiner for the Civil Aviation Authority of Sri Lanka. He was also the President of Sri Lanka College of Military Medicine in 2018
