= Gihan Wikramanayake =

Sri Lankan computer scientist and academic (1960–2018)

- Born: 17 January 1960; Colombo, Sri Lanka
- Died: 5 January 2018 (aged 57); Colombo, Sri Lanka
- Education: University of Wales, College of Cardiff; University of Colombo; Royal College Colombo; St. Aloysius' College (Galle)
- Spouse: Kishani
- Children: Ishika, Sherantha
- Scientific career
- Fields: Professor of Computer Science
- Workplaces: University of Colombo
- Doctoral advisor: Prof. W.A. Gray

Gihan Nilendra Wikramanayake, FBCS, CITP (17 January 1960 – 5 January 2018) was a Sri Lankan academic. He was a Senior Professor in Computer Science and attached to the Department of Information Systems Engineering. He was the Director of the University of Colombo School of Computing (UCSC) from 24 May 2010 to 31 May 2016. He was the Head of the Department of Information Systems Engineering from September 2002 to September 2005. He also served as the deputy director of the UCSC from 2003 to 2006.

== Education ==
Educated at St. Aloysius' College (Galle) and Royal College Colombo, he graduated from the University of Colombo with a BSc in statistics and mathematics with First Class Honours in 1984 and went on to gain a MSc and PhD in computer science from the University of Wales, College of Cardiff in 1989 and 1996.

== Academic career ==
In 1984 he joined the Computer Centre of the University of Colombo as a trainee programmer, he moved to the Department of Statistics and Computer Science as a researcher before becoming an Assistant Lecturer. In 1990 he became a Lecturer and Senior Lecturer in 1996. Moving to the new Department of Computer Science in 2000 he became its acting Head in 2002.

In 2002 he became the head, Department of Information Systems Engineering, UCSC and deputy director, UCSC in 2004. From 2007 to 2008 he was the acting Head, Department of Communication and Media Technologies. He was also a visiting scholar of University of New Mexico, Stockholm University and Umeå University. In 2010 he became the Director of the UCSC and a professor of Computer Science. He served two terms as director UCSC.

== Death ==
On 5 January 2018, Wikramanayake died at the age of 57 from motor neurone disease.
