= St. Aloysius' College, Galle =

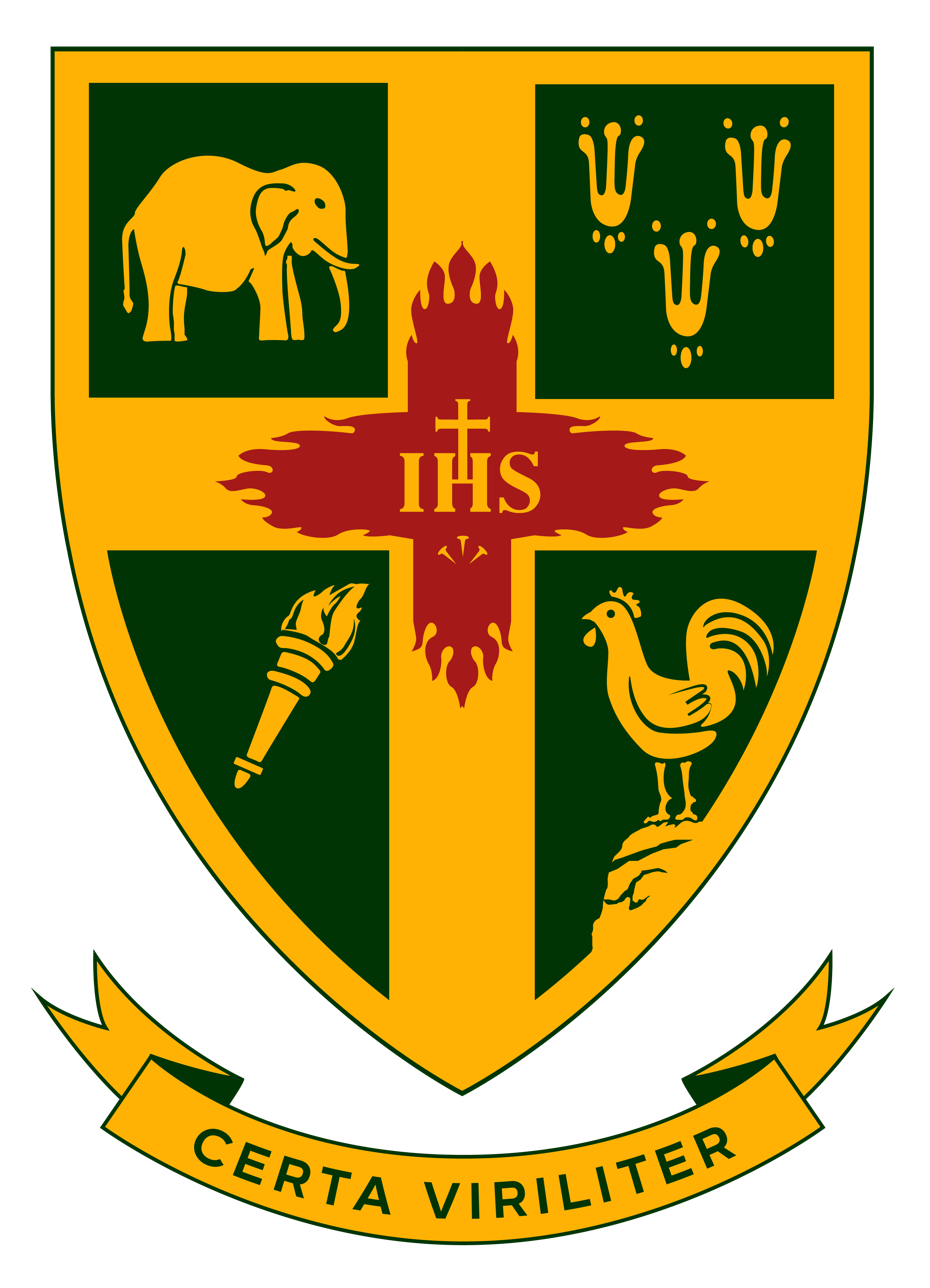
- The Crest of St. Aloysius' College, Galle

Location
- Templars' Road; Galle, Southern Province 80000; Sri Lanka; 6°2′9″N 80°12′44″E

Information
- Type: National School
- Religious affiliations: Society of Jesuits and The Church
- Established: 1895; 131 years ago
- Founder: Society of Jesus
- Principal: A. J. P. Pubudu Sampath
- Grades: 1 to G.C.E. Advanced Level
- Gender: Boys
- Enrollment: 3500+
- Colours: Green and gold
- Slogan: Latin: Certa Viriliter; Strive Manfully
- Alumni: Old Aloysians
- Nickname of Students: Aloysian
- Website: aloysiuscollege.lk

Saint Aloysius' College (Sinhala: ශාන්ත ඇලෝෂියස් විද්‍යාලය) is a boys' high school located in Galle, the capital city of Southern Province in Sri Lanka. The school was established in 1895 by recently arrived Belgian Jesuit missionaries, led by Joseph Van Reeth, first bishop of Galle. St. Aloysius' College is a national school that provides primary and secondary education. In 2012, it had 3500 students on its roll.

== History ==
St. Aloysius' College is situated on Mount Calvary, neighbouring St. Mary's Cathedral on one side and Sacred Heart Convent on the other. The college was established in 1895 by Belgian Jesuit fathers and was named after the Jesuit saint, Saint Aloysius Gonzaga. St. Aloysius' College, Galle, is one of many schools named St Aloysius' College.

Until the Sri Lankan government passed legislation for the nationalisation of schools in the island (with an exception of only a few schools), St. Aloysius' College was run by Jesuit Fathers, and the medium of instruction was English. The first Buddhist principal was appointed in 1971, and subsequently the medium of instruction was changed to Sinhala.

== College today ==
The college provides education to 3500 students from grade 1 to G.C.E. A/L. The students of the school fall into diverse religious groups where over 90 percent of students are Buddhists and the others are Christian (or Catholic) and Muslim.

=== Crest ===
Centre: IHS – Iesus Hominum Salvator("Jesus Saviour of Mankind")
1. The Tusker – Courage
2. Lilies – Purity of conscience
3. Torch – Torch of learning
4. Rooster – Symbol of Galle

=== Houses ===
Students represent five houses that are named after Jesuit Fathers who were pioneers in developing the school in its early days. Students are divided into houses according to their admission number.

- -Cooreman
- -Murphy
- -Neut
- -Standaert
- -Vanreeth

== Sports ==
Sports is a major part of St. Aloysius’ College. Cricket, Basketball, Rugby, Football, Hockey and Swimming are some of the sports among over 20 sports in College.

=== Rugby ===
Rugby takes a prominent role as it has a history starting from 1980s. As a foot step of that, with the motto ‘‘ Born with the Stuff ’’ Rugby was introduced at St. Aloysius’ in latter part of 1980s. The first historic match was played in 1992 against Richmond College. Taking centre stage of the annual sporting calendar are the St. Aloysius' - Richmond Rugby Encounter.

=== Basketball ===
The annual St.Aloysius'- Mahinda basketball encounter, is an annual basketball match played between St.Aloysius' College and Mahinda College, Galle.

== Cricket ==
St. Aloysius' College, Galle, maintains a prominent cricket tradition, participating in several annual "Big Match" encounters that serve as key fixtures in the Southern Province's school cricket calendar. These matches are frequently hosted at the Galle International Stadium.

The college’s primary annual fixtures include:

- The Battle of the Two Cities: A long-standing encounter contested between St. Aloysius' College and Rahula College, Matara, representing a significant rivalry between two of the region's leading institutions.
- The Battle of the Glory of Galle: An annual one-day fixture played against Vidyaloka College, Galle. The match serves as a celebration of the city's local cricket heritage.
- The Battle of Dreams: An annual two-day encounter inaugurated in 2025 between St. Aloysius' College and Holy Cross College, Kalutara. Designed to foster competitive ties and sportsmanship between the two schools, the fixture has quickly established itself as a growing tradition. The second edition of the encounter, held in March 2026 at the Galle International Stadium, concluded in a draw.

== Principals ==
Main Hall

Period	Principal
1896 – 1910	Joseph Van Reeth
1910 – 1921	Dionysius Murphy
1921 – 1925	John Delaney
1925 – 1949	Ernest Gaspard
1949 – 1962	Paul Nazarine Peiris
1963 – 1968	Paul Caspersz
1968 – 1970	Stephen Fernando (acting)
1970 – 1971	Paul Caspersz
13 June 1971 – 1 April 1972	B. K. Silva
1 April 1972 – 28 February 1973	Dunstan Fernando
28 February 1973 – 3 August 1973	J. B. Varnakulasingham (acting)
3 August 1973 – 22 December 1975	L. D. P. Jayasinghe
22 December 1975 – 25 May 1976	A. B. J. L. Fernando (acting)
25 May 1976 – 7 January 1987	D. Y. Wijewickrama
7 January 1987 – 1996	A. V. Illeperuma
1996 – 2004	N. K. Ariyawansa
2004 –2004	Nandasena Pathirana (acting)
2004 – 2014	D. P. L. S. Gunasekara
2014 - 2014	Piyasiri Kumarage (acting)
2014 - 2017 October	Ranjith Thilakarathne
2017 - 2017	L.P.Weeraman (acting)
2017 - 2020	Nayanapriya Perera
2020 - 2024	Anura Gamage
2024–Present	A.J.P.Pubudu Sampath

== Old Boys' associations ==
There are a number of branches of the school's Old Boys’ Association located all around the world, including Australia, New Zealand, Qatar and the United Kingdom.

== Notable alumni ==
Name	Notability	Reference
Ediriweera Sarachchandra	playwright, novelist, poet and literary critic	
Cyril Ponnamperuma	Scientist (Molecular Evolution) in Exobiology Division at NASA's Ames Research Center	
R. I. T. Alles	educationist, founder of D. S. Senanayake College (Colombo, Sri Lanka)	
N. U. Jayawardena	economist, Governor of the Central Bank of Ceylon (1953–1954)	
A. C. Alles	Judge of the Supreme Court of Sri Lanka (1964–1974)	
Shantha Kottegoda	General - Commander of the Army (2004–2005)	
Lalith Gamage	President - Sri Lanka Institute of Information Technology	
Gihan Wikramanayake	Director, University of Colombo School of Computing	
D. V. J. Harischandra	consultant psychiatrist, author, buddhist scholar	
Sirisena Amarasiri	Chief Minister of Southern Province (1998–1993), Governor of Uva (1999–2003)	
Chandima Weerakkody	Member of Parliament (Galle) (2009–present)	
Sunil Santha	musician, composer, singer, lyricist	
A. R. M. Thassim	business owner, philanthropist, Mayor of Galle (1950–51; 1954–62)	
Patrick Denipitiya	songwriter, composer, music arranger, instrumentalist	
Dilith Jayaweera	Chairman - George Steuart Group, Director - Citrus Leisure PLC, Managing Director - Triad (Pvt) Ltd, Member of Parliament – National List (2024–present)	
Lalith Jayaweera	Air Vice Marshal, Director General Health Services at Sri Lanka Air Force	
Chathuranga de Silva	One Day International cricket player (2014)	
Harsha Vithana	First class cricket player	
Mohan P. de Silva	Member of Parliament (Galle) (2010–present)	
Asoka Abeygunawardana	Chairman, CEO of Strategic Enterprise Management Agency at Presidential Secretariat	
Ashen Bandara	International cricketer	
Percy Abeysekera	Cricket superfan	
Anura Karunathilaka	Cabinet Minister (current)	
Rathna Gamage	State Minister (current)	

== See also ==
- Saint Aloysius Gonzaga
- List of Jesuit sites
