= Hiniduma Polling Division =

Hiniduma
- Polling Division
- Coordinates: 6.309662°N 80.347707°E
- Country: Sri Lanka
- Province: Southern Province, Sri Lanka
- Electoral District: Galle Electoral District

Area
  - Total: 442.46 km^{2} (170.83 sq mi)

Population (2012)
  - Total: 96,823
  - Density: 219/km^{2} (570/sq mi)
- ISO 3166 code: EC-07E

The Hiniduma Polling Division is a Polling Division in the Galle Electoral District, in the Southern Province, Sri Lanka.

== Presidential Election Results ==
=== Summary ===
The winner of Hiniduma has matched the final country result 6 out of 8 times. Hence, Hiniduma is a Weak Bellwether for Presidential Elections.

Year	Hiniduma	Galle Electoral District	MAE %	Sri Lanka	MAE %
2019	SLPP	SLPP	1.78%	SLPP	9.49%
2015	UPFA	UPFA	1.99%	NDF	9.89%
2010	UPFA	UPFA	0.16%	UPFA	5.56%
2005	UPFA	UPFA	1.85%	UPFA	6.21%
1999	PA	PA	0.28%	PA	3.59%
1994	PA	PA	2.74%	PA	3.77%
1988	SLFP	SLFP	3.78%	UNP	3.00%
1982	UNP	UNP	4.03%	UNP	2.06%
Matches/Mean MAE	6/8	6/8	2.08%	8/8	5.45%

=== 2019 Sri Lankan Presidential Election ===
Party	Hiniduma		Galle Electoral District		Sri Lanka	
Party	Votes	%	Votes	%	Votes	%
SLPP	54,299	62.66%	466,148	64.26%	6,924,255	52.25%
NDF	28,046	32.37%	217,401	29.97%	5,564,239	41.99%
NMPP	2,479	2.86%	27,006	3.72%	418,553	3.16%
Other Parties (with < 1%)	1,827	2.11%	14,803	2.04%	345,452	2.61%
Valid Votes	86,651	99.29%	725,358	99.20%	13,252,499	98.99%
Rejected Votes	624	0.71%	5,878	0.80%	135,452	1.01%
Total Polled	87,275	87.02%	731,236	85.15%	13,387,951	83.71%
Registered Electors	100,295		858,749		15,992,568	

=== 2015 Sri Lankan Presidential Election ===
Party	Hiniduma		Galle Electoral District		Sri Lanka	
Party	Votes	%	Votes	%	Votes	%
UPFA	47,464	57.58%	377,126	55.64%	5,768,090	47.58%
NDF	34,022	41.27%	293,994	43.37%	6,217,162	51.28%
Other Parties (with < 1%)	942	1.14%	6,691	0.99%	138,200	1.14%
Valid Votes	82,428	99.05%	677,811	99.05%	12,123,452	98.85%
Rejected Votes	790	0.95%	6,516	0.95%	140,925	1.15%
Total Polled	83,218	82.59%	684,327	80.46%	12,264,377	78.69%
Registered Electors	100,757		850,549		15,585,942	

=== 2010 Sri Lankan Presidential Election ===
Party	Hiniduma		Galle Electoral District		Sri Lanka	
Party	Votes	%	Votes	%	Votes	%
UPFA	47,987	63.60%	386,971	63.69%	6,015,934	57.88%
NDF	26,061	34.54%	211,633	34.83%	4,173,185	40.15%
Other Parties (with < 1%)	1,405	1.86%	9,017	1.48%	204,494	1.97%
Valid Votes	75,453	99.40%	607,621	99.38%	10,393,613	99.03%
Rejected Votes	457	0.60%	3,765	0.62%	101,838	0.97%
Total Polled	75,910	80.55%	611,386	77.82%	10,495,451	66.70%
Registered Electors	94,245		785,663		15,734,587	

=== 2005 Sri Lankan Presidential Election ===
Party	Hiniduma		Galle Electoral District		Sri Lanka	
Party	Votes	%	Votes	%	Votes	%
UPFA	42,304	56.46%	347,233	58.41%	4,887,152	50.29%
UNP	31,489	42.03%	239,320	40.26%	4,706,366	48.43%
Other Parties (with < 1%)	1,136	1.52%	7,915	1.33%	123,521	1.27%
Valid Votes	74,929	99.13%	594,468	99.08%	9,717,039	98.88%
Rejected Votes	654	0.87%	5,540	0.92%	109,869	1.12%
Total Polled	75,583	84.78%	600,008	79.86%	9,826,908	69.51%
Registered Electors	89,156		751,327		14,136,979	

=== 1999 Sri Lankan Presidential Election ===
Party	Hiniduma		Galle Electoral District		Sri Lanka	
Party	Votes	%	Votes	%	Votes	%
PA	35,712	54.85%	281,154	54.91%	4,312,157	51.12%
UNP	25,292	38.85%	195,906	38.26%	3,602,748	42.71%
JVP	3,183	4.89%	27,257	5.32%	343,927	4.08%
Other Parties (with < 1%)	922	1.42%	7,702	1.50%	176,679	2.09%
Valid Votes	65,109	98.68%	512,019	98.14%	8,435,754	97.69%
Rejected Votes	873	1.32%	9,716	1.86%	199,536	2.31%
Total Polled	65,982	83.78%	521,735	77.43%	8,635,290	72.17%
Registered Electors	78,752		673,785		11,965,536	

=== 1994 Sri Lankan Presidential Election ===
Party	Hiniduma		Galle Electoral District		Sri Lanka	
Party	Votes	%	Votes	%	Votes	%
PA	34,003	58.59%	285,398	61.40%	4,709,205	62.28%
UNP	23,216	40.00%	173,282	37.28%	2,715,283	35.91%
Other Parties (with < 1%)	819	1.41%	6,135	1.32%	137,040	1.81%
Valid Votes	58,038	98.21%	464,815	98.49%	7,561,526	98.03%
Rejected Votes	1,059	1.79%	7,112	1.51%	151,706	1.97%
Total Polled	59,097	79.50%	471,927	73.01%	7,713,232	69.12%
Registered Electors	74,337		646,373		11,158,880	

=== 1988 Sri Lankan Presidential Election ===
Party	Hiniduma		Galle Electoral District		Sri Lanka	
Party	Votes	%	Votes	%	Votes	%
SLFP	22,347	49.47%	148,615	53.09%	2,289,857	44.95%
UNP	22,029	48.77%	124,912	44.62%	2,569,199	50.43%
SLMP	794	1.76%	6,417	2.29%	235,701	4.63%
Valid Votes	45,170	98.38%	279,944	98.43%	5,094,754	98.24%
Rejected Votes	745	1.62%	4,461	1.57%	91,499	1.76%
Total Polled	45,915	70.30%	284,405	49.34%	5,186,256	55.87%
Registered Electors	65,310		576,390		9,283,143	

=== 1982 Sri Lankan Presidential Election ===
Party	Hiniduma		Galle Electoral District		Sri Lanka	
Party	Votes	%	Votes	%	Votes	%
UNP	27,209	55.73%	211,544	50.23%	3,450,815	52.93%
SLFP	19,649	40.25%	180,925	42.96%	2,546,348	39.05%
JVP	1,629	3.34%	20,962	4.98%	273,428	4.19%
Other Parties (with < 1%)	334	0.68%	7,707	1.83%	249,460	3.83%
Valid Votes	48,821	98.78%	421,138	98.78%	6,520,156	98.78%
Rejected Votes	605	1.22%	5,198	1.22%	80,470	1.22%
Total Polled	49,426	86.60%	426,336	81.84%	6,600,626	80.15%
Registered Electors	57,075		520,909		8,235,358	

== Parliamentary Election Results ==
=== Summary ===
The winner of Hiniduma has matched the final country result 5 out of 7 times. Hence, Hiniduma is a Weak Bellwether for Parliamentary Elections.

Year	Hiniduma	Galle Electoral District	MAE %	Sri Lanka	MAE %
2015	UPFA	UPFA	1.46%	UNP	4.39%
2010	UPFA	UPFA	1.72%	UPFA	5.62%
2004	UPFA	UPFA	1.26%	UPFA	6.65%
2001	PA	UNP	0.96%	UNP	3.62%
2000	PA	PA	0.94%	PA	3.00%
1994	PA	PA	1.27%	PA	3.64%
1989	UNP	UNP	2.95%	UNP	5.43%
Matches/Mean MAE	5/7	6/7	1.51%	7/7	4.62%

=== 2015 Sri Lankan Parliamentary Election ===
Party	Hiniduma		Galle Electoral District		Sri Lanka	
Party	Votes	%	Votes	%	Votes	%
UPFA	39,237	51.16%	312,518	50.07%	4,732,664	42.48%
UNP	33,999	44.33%	265,180	42.49%	5,098,916	45.77%
JVP	3,020	3.94%	37,778	6.05%	544,154	4.88%
Other Parties (with < 1%)	441	0.57%	8,659	1.39%	82,852	0.74%
Valid Votes	76,697	97.33%	624,135	97.63%	11,140,333	95.35%
Rejected Votes	2,094	2.66%	15,107	2.36%	516,926	4.42%
Total Polled	78,800	78.21%	639,318	78.00%	11,684,111	77.66%
Registered Electors	100,757		819,666		15,044,490	

=== 2010 Sri Lankan Parliamentary Election ===
Party	Hiniduma		Galle Electoral District		Sri Lanka	
Party	Votes	%	Votes	%	Votes	%
UPFA	40,083	68.26%	305,307	66.17%	4,846,388	60.38%
UNP	15,616	26.59%	120,101	26.03%	2,357,057	29.37%
DNA	2,717	4.63%	33,663	7.30%	441,251	5.50%
Other Parties (with < 1%)	309	0.53%	2,317	0.50%	32,313	0.40%
Valid Votes	58,725	94.14%	461,388	95.05%	8,026,322	96.03%
Rejected Votes	3,657	5.86%	24,013	4.95%	581,465	6.96%
Total Polled	62,382	66.19%	485,401	61.67%	8,358,246	59.29%
Registered Electors	94,245		787,139		14,097,690	

=== 2004 Sri Lankan Parliamentary Election ===
Party	Hiniduma		Galle Electoral District		Sri Lanka	
Party	Votes	%	Votes	%	Votes	%
UPFA	38,633	57.25%	306,385	56.58%	4,223,126	45.70%
UNP	27,440	40.66%	209,399	38.67%	3,486,792	37.73%
JHU	1,119	1.66%	22,826	4.22%	552,723	5.98%
Other Parties (with < 1%)	291	0.43%	2,901	0.54%	60,066	0.65%
Valid Votes	67,483	93.92%	541,511	94.69%	9,241,931	94.52%
Rejected Votes	4,371	6.08%	30,380	5.31%	534,452	5.47%
Total Polled	71,854	83.22%	571,891	79.81%	9,777,821	75.74%
Registered Electors	86,343		716,609		12,909,631	

=== 2001 Sri Lankan Parliamentary Election ===
Party	Hiniduma		Galle Electoral District		Sri Lanka	
Party	Votes	%	Votes	%	Votes	%
PA	30,151	44.68%	232,931	42.98%	3,330,815	37.19%
UNP	29,666	43.97%	238,989	44.10%	4,086,026	45.62%
JVP	6,717	9.95%	61,806	11.41%	815,353	9.10%
Other Parties (with < 1%)	942	1.40%	8,188	1.51%	143,033	1.60%
Valid Votes	67,476	95.69%	541,914	95.66%	8,955,844	94.77%
Rejected Votes	3,042	4.31%	24,561	4.34%	494,009	5.23%
Total Polled	70,518	84.65%	566,475	81.09%	9,449,878	76.03%
Registered Electors	83,302		698,558		12,428,762	

=== 2000 Sri Lankan Parliamentary Election ===
Party	Hiniduma		Galle Electoral District		Sri Lanka	
Party	Votes	%	Votes	%	Votes	%
PA	34,278	51.74%	264,601	50.08%	3,899,329	45.33%
UNP	26,629	40.19%	212,055	40.14%	3,451,765	40.12%
JVP	4,493	6.78%	41,620	7.88%	518,725	6.03%
Other Parties (with < 1%)	852	1.29%	10,072	1.91%	250,489	2.91%
Valid Votes	66,252	N/A	528,348	N/A	8,602,617	N/A

=== 1994 Sri Lankan Parliamentary Election ===
Party	Hiniduma		Galle Electoral District		Sri Lanka	
Party	Votes	%	Votes	%	Votes	%
PA	33,648	55.45%	277,956	56.39%	3,887,805	48.94%
UNP	26,099	43.01%	203,268	41.24%	3,498,370	44.04%
Other Parties (with < 1%)	939	1.55%	11,690	2.37%	159,429	2.01%
Valid Votes	60,686	95.67%	492,914	95.96%	7,943,688	95.20%
Rejected Votes	2,747	4.33%	20,763	4.04%	400,395	4.80%
Total Polled	63,433	85.33%	513,677	79.57%	8,344,095	74.75%
Registered Electors	74,337		645,559		11,163,064	

=== 1989 Sri Lankan Parliamentary Election ===
Party	Hiniduma		Galle Electoral District		Sri Lanka	
Party	Votes	%	Votes	%	Votes	%
UNP	25,466	52.05%	183,962	50.40%	2,838,005	50.71%
SLFP	22,597	46.19%	152,096	41.67%	1,785,369	31.90%
Other Parties (with < 1%)	863	1.76%	28,947	7.93%	502,202	8.97%
Valid Votes	48,926	94.31%	365,005	93.94%	5,596,468	93.87%
Rejected Votes	2,954	5.69%	23,536	6.06%	365,563	6.13%
Total Polled	51,880	80.49%	388,541	68.03%	5,962,031	63.60%
Registered Electors	64,452		571,146		9,374,164	

== Demographics ==
=== Ethnicity ===
The Hiniduma Polling Division has a Sinhalese majority (95.9%) . In comparison, the Galle Electoral District (which contains the Hiniduma Polling Division) has a Sinhalese majority (94.4%)

Ethnicity in Hiniduma
1. Sinhalese (95.9%)
2. Sri Lankan Tamil (2.80%)
3. Indian Tamil (1.30%)
4. Other (0.00%)

=== Religion ===
The Hiniduma Polling Division has a Buddhist majority (95.7%) . In comparison, the Galle Electoral District (which contains the Hiniduma Polling Division) has a Buddhist majority (93.9%)

Religion in Hiniduma
1. Buddhist (95.7%)
2. Hindu (3.10%)
3. Other (1.20%)
