= Lionel Premasiri =

Sri Lankan politician

Hon. Lionel Premasiri MP

Deputy Minister of Social Services & Social Welfare
- In office 2007–2010

Member of Parliament for Galle District
- In office 2004–2010

Personal details
- Born: 11 November 1962 (age 63)
- Party: United National Party (Democratic)
- Other political affiliations: United People's Freedom Alliance
- Education: Mahinda College
- Profession: Lawyer

Peduru Hewage Lionel Premasiri is a Sri Lankan politician. He was a former representative of Galle District in the Parliament of Sri Lanka.

He studied at Mahinda College, Galle. He became a lawyer and then entered the politics from Sri Lanka Freedom Party and became the mayor of Galle. Later due to some discrepancies, he joined the United National Party and then became the mayor of Galle again. He became a member of Parliament in 2004 from United National Party. He was one of the first UNP politicians to join the Government of United People's Freedom Alliance. He was the deputy minister of Social Services and Social Welfare in the previous UPFA government.
