= Closenberg Hotel =

Hotel in Galle, Sri Lanka

Coordinates: 6.0320°N 80.2347°E

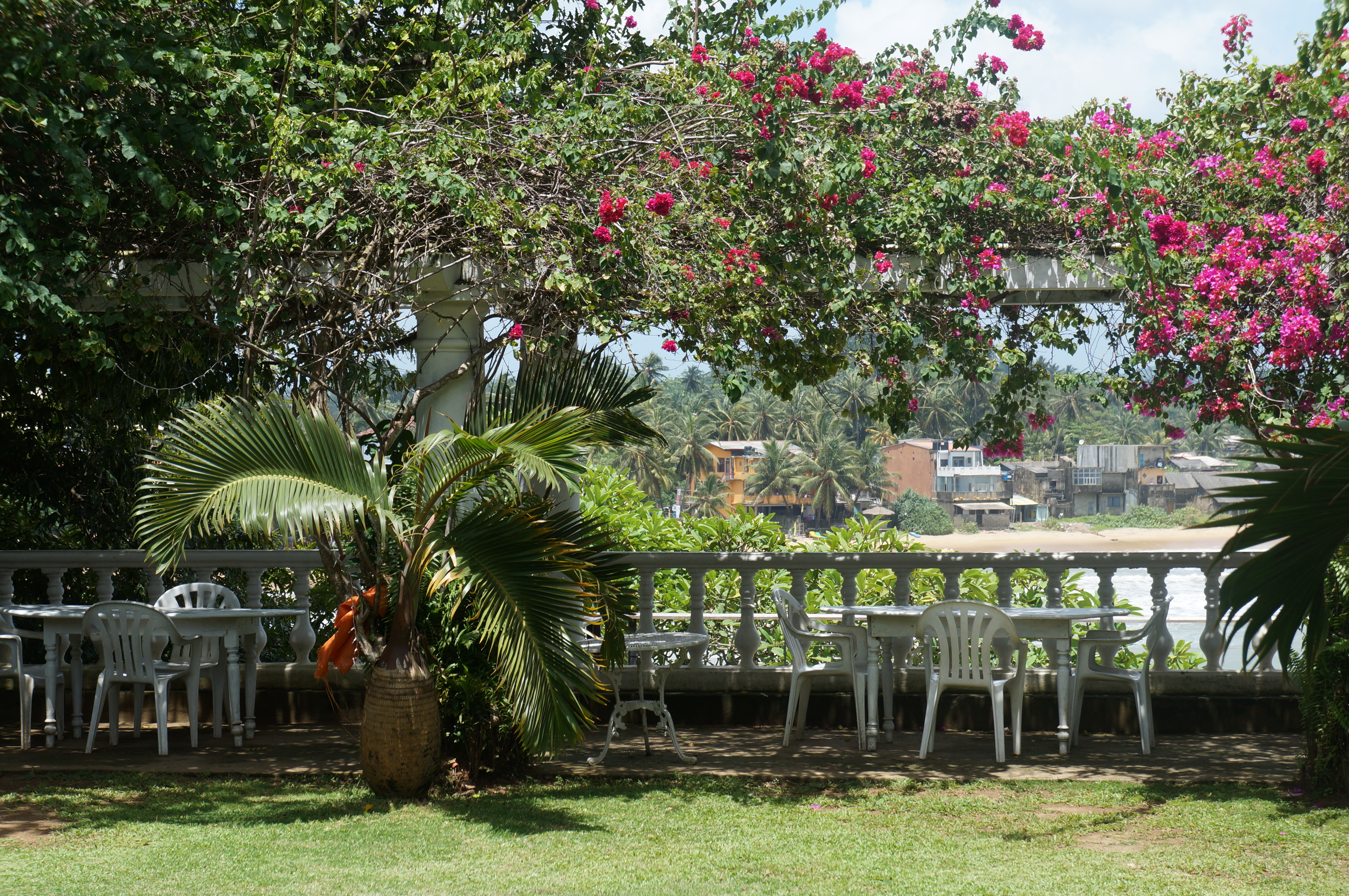
- Interactive map of the Closenberg Hotel area

General information
- Location: 11 Closenberg Road, Galle, Sri Lanka
- Opening: 1965
- Owner: Kumar Perera Abeywardena

Technical details
- Floor count: 2

Other information
- Number of rooms: 20
- Number of restaurants: 1

Website
- Official site

Closenberg Hotel is a three star heritage hotel located in Galle, Sri Lanka. It is situated on the southern side of Galle Harbour.

== History ==
In 1719 the Dutch built a small fortalice on an island promontory, on the southern side of the Galle bay. They called the island Klossenburg (or Kloffenburg), meaning 'fortalice or citadel on which the sea roars'. Klossenburg housed a battery of two guns and the Sinhalese called it 'Aluth Kotuwa' or the new fort.

By the time the British took over Galle in 1790, the fortress had been abandoned. It wasn't until Captain Francis Bayley, the agent for the Peninsular & Oriental Steam Navigation Company, arrived in Galle aboard the steamer ‘Hindustan’ in 1859. Bayley discovered the disused fort, negotiating and buying it from the British Crown. Bailey was also a master carpenter and mason, designing and building the manor in 1861. He named the building 'Villa Marina'. He also constructed a summerhouse at the end of the promontory where a flagstaff was used to fly the P&O flag. Bayley's wife, Lucy Matilda née Atkinson, was an artist, and decorated the house and gardens with a variety of ferns and blooms, sourced from various locations along the P&O trade route, from Calcutta to the Suez. Bayley resided in the house until 1871, when he sold it to P&O Steamship Company for the use as the official residence of the company's agent. Bayley continued to live there until the company shifted its offices to Colombo. The house was sold in 1889 to Simon Perera Abeywardena (the son-in-law of Charles Henry de Soysa) on the condition that the property had to remain in the hands of the Abeywardena family. Abeywardena changed the name of the mansion to 'Closenberg'. In 1965 the Abeywardena family home was converted into a hotel, with the four main rooms adapted as guest bedrooms and the former bachelors’ quarters modified to become a kitchen. In 1983 a further sixteen bijou rooms were added facing the sea. In 2003 these rooms were refurbished with air-conditioning added.
