= Cyril Ponnamperuma =

Sri Lankan scientist (1923–1994)

Cyril Ponnamperuma සිරිල් පොන්නම්පෙරුම
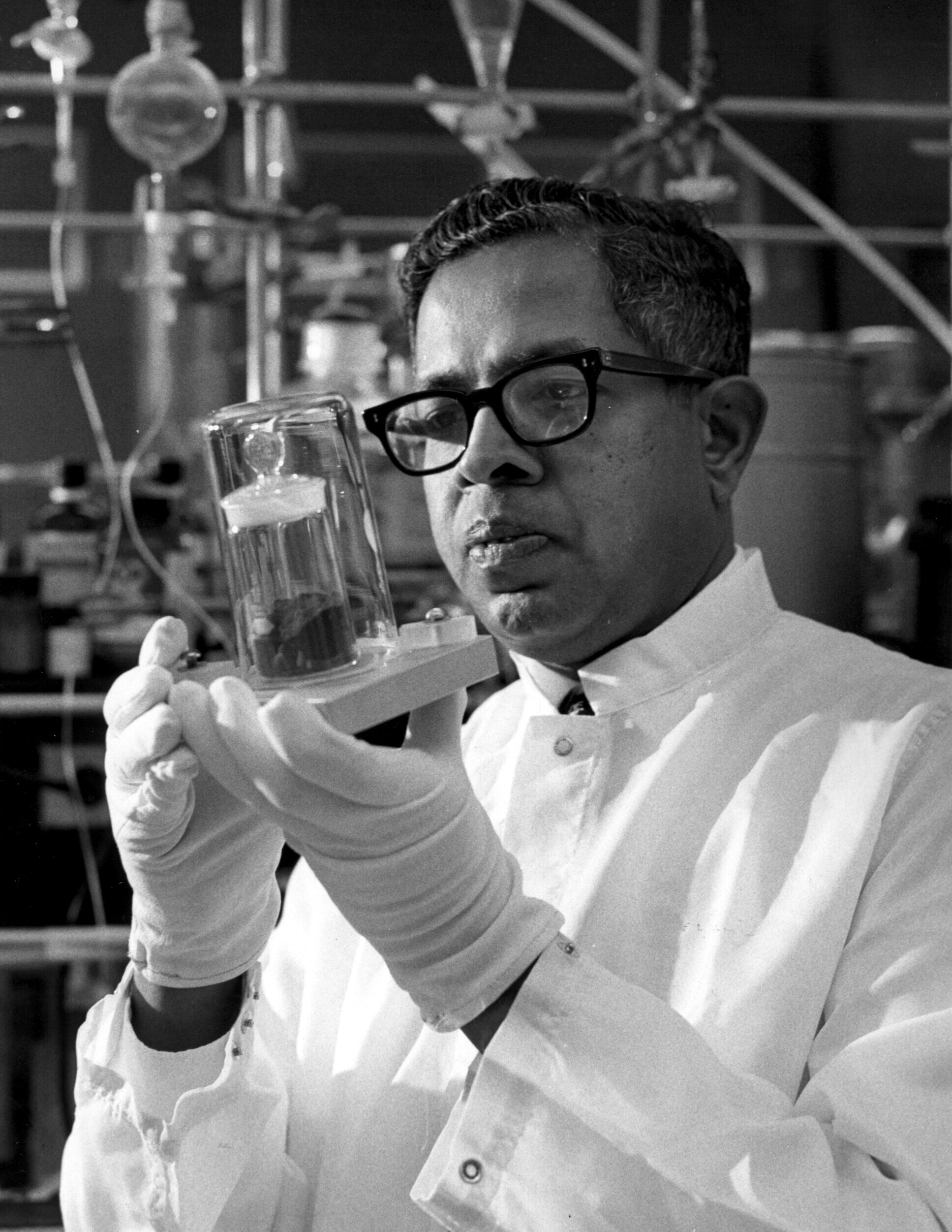
- Cyril Ponnamperuma analyzing a Moon sample
- Born: 16 October 1923; Galle, Southern Province, Sri Lanka
- Died: 20 December 1994 (aged 71); Takoma Park, Maryland
- Citizenship: Sri Lanka (1923-1971); United States (1971-1994)
- Education: Sri Piyarathana Vidyalaya, Dodanduwa, St. Aloysius' College, Galle; University of Madras; University of London; University of California, Berkeley
- Awards: Ordre des Arts et des Lettres
- Scientific career
- Fields: Chemical evolution
- Workplaces: University of Maryland

Dr. Cyril Andrew Ponnamperuma (Sinhala: ආචාර්ය සිරිල් ඇන්ඩෘ පොන්නම්පෙරුම) (16 October 1923 – 20 December 1994) was a Sri Lankan scientist in the fields of chemical evolution and the origin of life.

== Biography ==
Cyril Ponnamperuma was born in Sri Lanka on 16 October 1923. He received his early education at Piyarathana College in Dodanduwa, Galle and later enrolled at St. Aloysius' College, and subsequently St. Joseph's College, Colombo. In 1948, Ponnamperuma obtained a Bachelor of Arts degree in philosophy from the University of Madras.

He obtained a Bachelor of Science degree in chemistry at Birkbeck, University of London in 1959. During his studies at Birkbeck, he worked with Professor J. D. Bernal, on research about the origin of life. In 1962 he received a doctorate in chemistry from the University of California, Berkeley under the direction of the Nobel Laureate Melvin Calvin.

In 1962, he was honoured with a National Academy of Sciences resident associateship with NASA at Ames Research Center. In 1963 he joined NASA's Exobiology Division as lead of the Chemical Evolution Division. He was selected as the principal investigator for analysis of lunar soil brought to Earth by Project Apollo.

He was closely involved with NASA in the Viking and Voyager programmes and was offered membership in both the Space Science Advisory Council and Life Sciences Advisory Council of NASA.

According to Arthur C. Clarke, "No other scientist of Sri Lankan origin was internationally known and respected as he was". He produced over 400 scientific publications and held a number of prestigious academic posts.

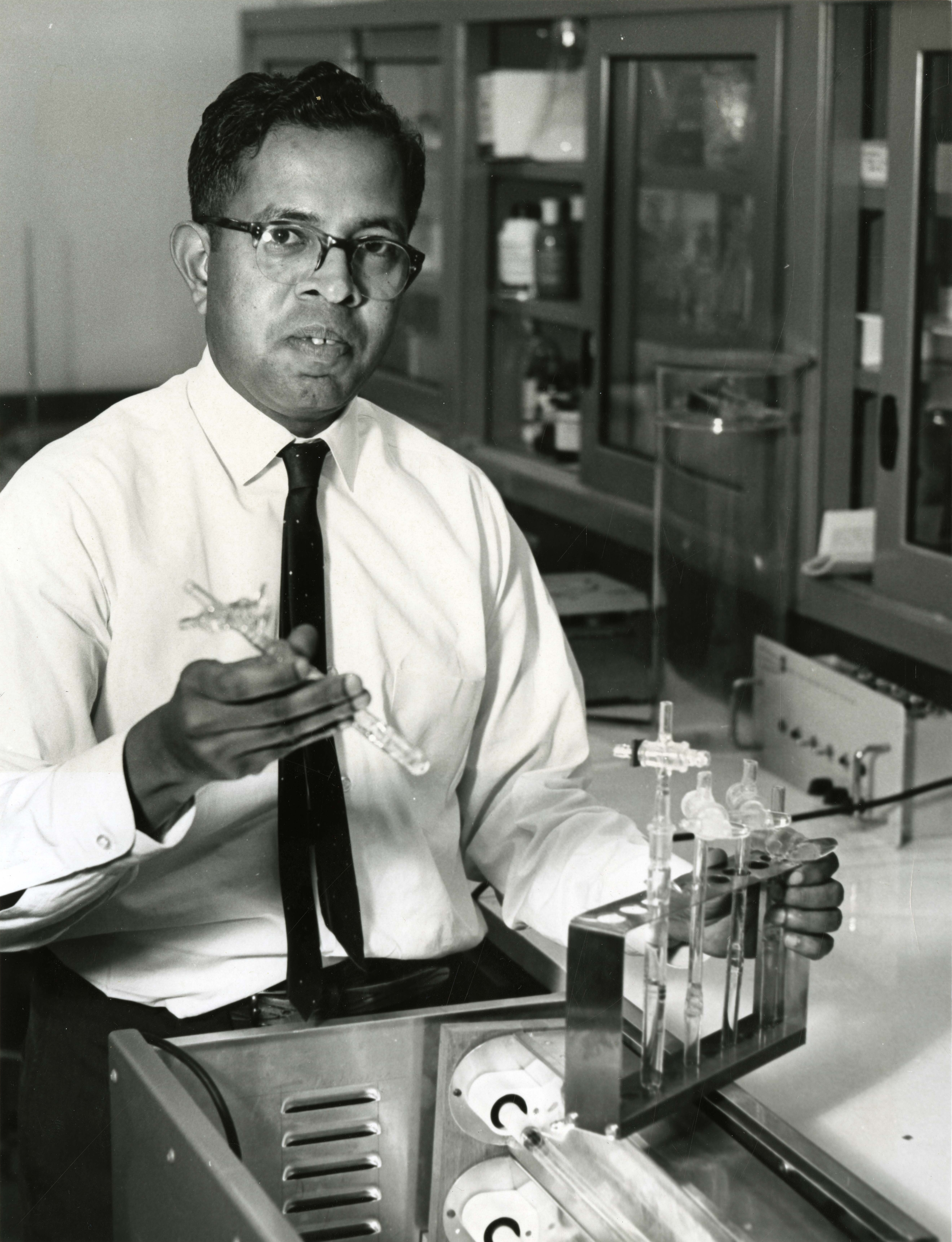
Cyril Ponnamperuma (1923-1994) of the Exobiology Division at NASA's Ames Research Center points out the simple laboratory equipment with which he artificially produced ATP, the source of energy for all forms of life. 1963 photo.

After he was selected for the analysis of the Moon dust in the 'Apollo Programme,' he was featured on the cover-pages of major publications like Time and Newsweek.

The "Third World Academy of Sciences" (TWAS) based in Trieste, Italy, elected him as its vice president in 1989 and appointed him chairman of the International Network of Science Centres in selected developing Countries.

He was the first director of the "Arthur C. Clarke Centre for Modern Technologies" in Sri Lanka, and in 1984 was appointed science advisor to the president of Sri Lanka by president J. R. Jayewardene. He also served as a distinguished lecturer at the Soviet Academy of Sciences and the Chinese Academy of Sciences.

The Atomic Energy Commission of India offered him an assignment as a visiting professor in 1967. UNESCO appointed him for a period covering 1970–1971 as its director of the programme for the development of basic research in Sri Lanka. After 1971 he became a professor of chemistry at the University of Maryland and director of the laboratory of chemical evolution.

In January 1991, he was awarded the first distinguished International Service Award. He also received the "Alexander Oparin Gold Medal" for the 'Best sustained Programme' on the origin of life awarded by the International Society for the study of the origin of life in 1980. "The Honour of Vidya Jyothy" was awarded to him at the 1990 National Day investiture ceremony by President Ranasinghe Premadasa.

He was nominated to the Pontical Academy of Sciences, a body of world-renowned scientists in the fields of mathematical and experimental sciences.

The Academy of Creative Endeavors, Moscow, awarded him the Harold Urey Prize and the Academy Medal for his outstanding contribution to the study of the origin of life.

His participation in the Sri Lankan scientific arena began in 1984, when he became the science adviser to the late Sri Lanka President J. R. Jayewardena. He was then appointed Director of the Institute of Fundamental Studies.

He died after suffering a heart attack at the Laboratory of Chemical Evolution, University of Maryland USA.

The remains of Professor Cyril Ponnamperuma were flown to Colombo on 9 January 1995.
