= Lanka Prajathanthravadi Pakshaya =

Ceylon Democratic Party ලoකා ප්‍රජාතන්ත්‍රවාදී පක්ශය
- Abbreviation: LPP
- Leader: Wijeyananda Dahanayake
- Founded: 1960
- Dissolved: 1965
- Merged into: Sri Lanka Freedom Socialist Party

The Lanka Prajathanthravadi Pakshaya (Ceylon Democratic Party) was a political party in Sri Lanka led by Prime Minister Wijeyananda Dahanayake. In the 1960 elections, the LPP was part of the Mahajana Eksath Peramuna coalition, consisting of the Sri Lanka Freedom Party, Viplavakari Lanka Sama Samaja Party, Jathika Vimukthi Peramuna and LPP.

Ahead of the 1965 elections, cooperation between the LPP and SLFP had collapsed. The LPP won only one seat. After the elections, LPP gave their support to the new United National Party government. Soon thereafter it merged into the Sri Lanka Freedom Socialist Party, which would later merge into the UNP.

== Electoral history ==
Sri Lanka Parliamentary Elections
Election year	Votes	Vote %	Seats won	+/–	Government
1960 March	135,138	4.44%	4 / 151	Steady	Opposition
1960 July	30,207	0.98%	2 / 151	▼2	Opposition
