= Sirisena Amarasiri =

Sri Lankan politician (1925–2007)

Hon. Matarage Sirisena Amarasiri

5th Governor of Uva
- In office 1999 – 25 April 2003
- Preceded by: Ananda Dassanayake
- Succeeded by: Nanda Mathew

1st Chief Minister of Southern Province
- In office 16 June 1988 – October 1993
- Preceded by: Office established
- Succeeded by: Amarasiri Dodangoda

Personal details
- Born: 5 September 1925
- Died: 8 January 2007 (aged 81)
- Resting place: Mapalagalama
- Party: United National Party
- Other political affiliations: Lanka Sama Samaja Party
- Education: St. Aloysius' College

Matarage Sirisena Amarasiri (5 September 1925 – 8 January 2007) was a Sri Lankan United National Party (UNP) member who assumed the role of 1st Chief Minister of Southern Province and 5th Governor of Uva.

Political offices
Preceded by Ananda Dassanayake	Governor of Uva; 1999–2003	Succeeded by Nanda Mathew
Preceded by Office created	Chief Minister of Southern Province; 1988–1993	Succeeded by Amarasiri Dodangoda
