= Galle Municipal Council =

Local authority in Sri Lanka

Type
- Type: Local authority

Leadership
- Mayor: Halvitigala Ihala Gamage Sunil, (NPP)
- Deputy Mayor: Priyantha Sahabandhu, (Independents)

Structure
- Seats: 36
- Political groups: Government: NPP (17); Opposition: SJB (9); UNP (5); SLPP (3); UPA (2)

Elections
- Voting system: Open list proportional representation
- Last election: 6 May 2025
- Next election: TBD

Website
- https://galle.mc.gov.lk/

The Galle Municipal Council is the local council for Galle, the capital city of Southern Province of Sri Lanka, the third level administrative division of the country. The council was established under the Municipalities Ordinance of 1865 as the third municipal council of Sri Lanka. Wijeyananda Dahanayake was the first elected mayor of the city, who was appointed in 1939. He later went on to become the fifth Prime Minister of Ceylon. The current mayor of Galle is Priyantha Godagama Sahabandu.

== Geography ==
The Galle Four Gravets is 18.7 km^{2} (7.2 sq mi) in area. The average elevation above sea level is 15 m (49 ft).

== Administrative units ==
Galle Municipal Council is divided into 50 Grama Niladhari Divisions (GN Divisions), with seven villages.

== Population ==
The current population of Galle Four Gravets area, according to 2011 Census, is 101,159, a decline from the population of 103,246 in 2001.

Ethnicity in Galle (2011)
Population	Percent
Sinhalese	67.0%
Muslims	32.3%
Tamils	0.8%
Others	0.13%

Ethnicity	Population	% Of Total
Sinhalese	67,470	67.0
Sri Lankan Moors	32,711	32.3
Sri Lankan Tamils	709	0.7
Indian Tamils	129	0.8
Other (including Burgher, Malay)	140	0.13
Total	101,159	100

== Mayor ==
The Mayor of Galle is the head of Galle Municipal Council and his office is located at the Galle Town Hall. The current mayor is Priyantha Godagama Sahabandu, who was elected into office, subsequent to the 2018 Sri Lankan local elections, in a secret ballot held on 23 March 2018. Sahabandu was elected to the position of mayor obtaining 20 votes to 11 over his rival candidate, Jilith Nishantha of the UNP.

== Representation ==
The Galle Municipal Council is divided into 15 wards and is represented by 35 councillors, elected using an open list proportional representation system.

=== 2025 local government election ===
UNP : 5 seats
SLPP: 3 seats
SJB: 9 seats
PA: 2 seats
SB : 0 seats
Others : 0 seats
NPP: 17 seats

=== 2018 local government election ===
Results of the local government election held on 8 February 2018:

Alliances and parties	Votes	%	Seats
United National Party	22,270	40.17%	14
Sri Lanka Podujana Peramuna	20,096	36.25%	13
United People's Freedom Alliance (NC, ACMC, SLFP et al.)	5,532	9.98%	3
Janatha Vimukthi Peramuna	5,177	9.34%	3
United National Freedom Front	1,265	2.28%	1
Independent 2	896	1.62%	1
Independent 1	206	0.37%	0
Valid Votes	55,442	100.00%	35
Rejected Votes	1,026		
Total Polled	56,468		
Registered Electors	71,858		
Turnout	78.58%		

=== 2011 local government election ===
Results of the local government election held on 8 October 2011:

Alliances and parties	Votes	%	Seats
United People's Freedom Alliance (NC, ACMC, SLFP et al.)	23,539	55.39%	11
United National Party	16,137	37.97%	7
Sri Lanka Muslim Congress	1,085	2.55%	1
Janatha Vimukthi Peramuna	164	1.44%	0
Independent 3	87	0.20%	0
Janasetha Peramuna	17	0.04%	0
Independent 4	10	0.02%	0
United Lanka Great Council (Eksath Lanka Maha Sabha)	9	0.02%	0
Independent 6	9	0.02%	0
Independent 2	8	0.02%	0
Independent 1	6	0.01%	0
Ruhuna People's Party (Ruhunu Janatha Party)	4	0.01%	0
Independent 5	3	0.01%	0
Valid Votes	42,494	100.00%	19
Rejected Votes	1,179		
Total Polled	43,673		
Registered Electors	64,720		
Turnout	67.48%		

The Galle Municipal Council has five standing committees each headed by committee chairman. The standing committees are Finance and Tender, Works and Solid Waste, Health and Sanitisation, Electricity and Water, and Environment.
