= Percy Abeysekera =

Sri Lankan cricket cheerleader (1936–2023)

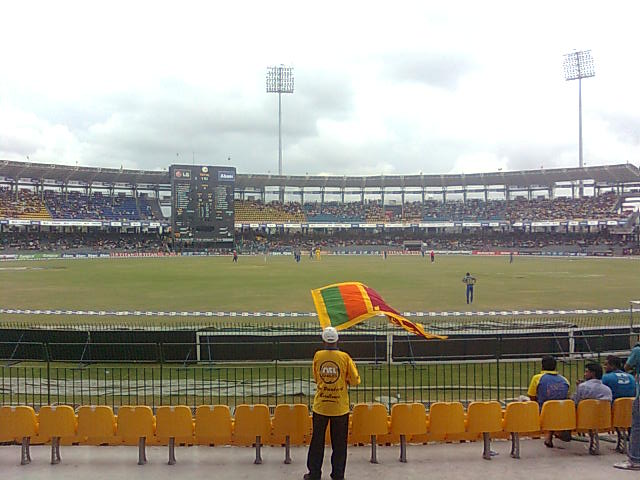
- Abeysekera in 2011
- Born: W. D. Percy Gimson Mendis Abeysekera; 30 July 1936; Boossa, Sri Lanka
- Died: 30 October 2023 (aged 87)
- Other name: Uncle Percy
- Education: Richmond College, Galle; St. Aloysius' College, Galle; Siri Rathanasara Vidyalaya, Baddegama; Aquinas University College, Colombo
- Spouse: Meloney De Silva (m. 1968; died 2010)
- Children: Sampath Garfield (son); Nadeesh Nimmi (daughter)
- Website: www.percyabeysekera.com

W. D. Percy Gimson Mendis Abeysekera (30 July 1936 – 30 October 2023), known as Uncle Percy, was a Sri Lankan cricket superfan for over seven decades. His support for Sri Lankan cricket became part of Sri Lankan cricketing culture.

== Early life and family ==
Percy Abeysekera was born on July 30, 1936, in the coastal town of Boossa, Sri Lanka. In 1968, Abeysekera married Meloney De Silva from Moratuwa. They had two children: Sampath Garfield, their elder son, and Nadeesh Nimmi, their daughter. Meloney died on September 24, 2010.

== Education ==
He received his early education at Richmond College, Galle and St. Aloysius' College, Galle, where he developed his interest in cricket. He went on to Siri Rathanasara Vidyalaya Beddegama and Aquinas University College, Colombo.

== Professional life ==
Abeysekera's career began with a stint at Associate Motorways (AMW) in Nagoda, Kalutara, from 1961 to 1962. He then joined ACL Cables Factory, a subsidiary of the AMW Group, in 1962, where he worked for five decades.

== Cheerleading and cricket ==
Abeysekera made his debut as a cheerleader with the Lion flag in 1979.

He attended his first international cricket match in 1948, an encounter between Australia and All Ceylon at the P Sara Stadium. This match featured Sir Don Bradman.

Abeysekera played an active role as a cricketer, donning the jersey of St. Aloysius’ College's 2nd XI and Aquinas University College's cricket team. He captained the first AMW cricket team to win the Mercantile 'G' Division title in 1968, defeating Lake House at Rifle Green (Air Force Ground) in Colombo.

== Death and legacy ==
Abeysekera died on 30 October 2023, at the age of 87. Former India captain Ravi Shastri once wrote, "Percy, don't lose your voice. Sri Lanka needs it more than you." Former New Zealand captain, the late Martin Crowe, once gave away his Man of the Match award to Percy. In Australia, he was briefly arrested for entering the field of play. Michael Clarke and Adam Gilchrist protested, warning not to turn this into an international crisis.

== See also ==
- Chacha Cricket, a fan of the Pakistan cricket team
- Sudhir Kumar Chaudhary, a fan of the Indian cricket team
