= Chacha Cricket =

Pakistani cricket mascot

- چاچا کرکٹ
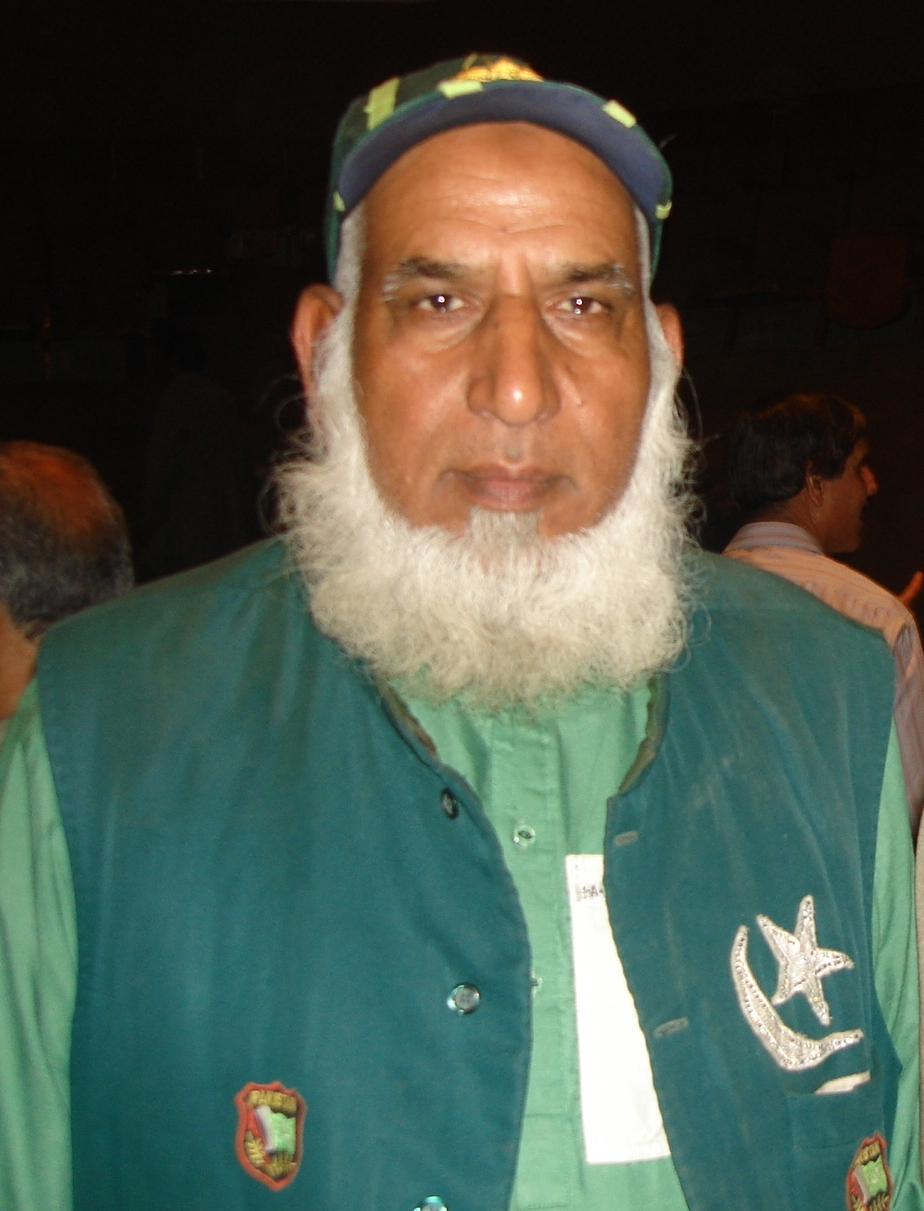
- Chacha Cricket in 2009
- Born: Chaudhry Abdul Jalil; 8 October 1949 (age 77); Sialkot, West Punjab, Dominion of Pakistan
- Other name: Chacha Pakistani
- Occupations: Cricket fan; entertainer
- Employer: Pakistan Cricket Board
- Children: 5

Chaudhry Abdul Jalil (Urdu: چوہدری عبدالجلیل, born 8 October 1949), famously known as Chacha Cricket (Urdu: چاچا کرکٹ) (meaning 'Uncle Cricket'), is a Pakistani cricket mascot.

Abdul Jalil is regularly seen at cricket matches involving Pakistan. He is easily recognized by his white beard, his full green kurta dress, and his white cap decorated with a sequined star and crescent moon. He is usually armed with a Pakistani flag and initiates many crowd chants.

While his support for Pakistan is very strong, he remains good-natured and is also a popular figure amongst opposition fans such as England's Barmy Army.

== Career ==
=== Early years (1969–1996) ===
Abdul Jalil watched his first international match at Lahore Stadium at the age of 19, when the England team led by Colin Cowdrey visited Pakistan in 1969. From 1973 to 1996, he worked as an assistant foreman at a water-pumping station in Abu Dhabi. He first rose to prominence during the 1994 Austral-Asia Cup in Sharjah, where he debuted his unique outfit and his ability to engage the crowd in passionate chants.

By 1996, his face was recognizable to virtually every Pakistani cricket fan. It was then that the Pakistan Cricket Board offered him to become their official cheerleader. PCB Chairman Syed Zulfiqar Bokhari asked him to return to Pakistan, where he would be sponsored by the Board to accompany the national team on domestic and foreign tours. Abdul Jalil consulted with cricketers Wasim Akram and Moin Khan, who persuaded him to come since they expected Pakistan International Airlines cricket team, the team they represented domestically, to employ him. Therefore, he returned to his native country after leaving his job in 1998.

=== Return to Pakistan ===
When he returned, elections had taken place, and the new government brought changes to the Pakistan Cricket Board. Bokhari stepped down and the new secretary, Waqar Ahmed, was not on board with the idea of a travelling cheerleader. As a result, he did not get an official recommendation for his visa application for the 1999 Cricket World Cup in England. He, therefore, went to the embassy with pictures of himself at cricket grounds across the world, which impressed a senior official who approved his application.

== Personal life ==
Abdul Jalil hails from Sialkot in the Punjab province of Pakistan. He is married and has five children.

== See also ==
- Shoaib Ali Bukhari, a superfan known for his support to Bangladesh national cricket team
- Sudhir Kumar Chaudhary, another fan known for attending matches of the Indian national cricket team
