= Shoaib Ali Bukhari =

Bangladeshi cricket superfan

Shoaib Ali Bukhari (Bengali: শোয়েব আলী বুখারী) is a cricket superfan from Bangladesh. He is known for attending matches at the Sher-e-Bangla National Cricket Stadium in Mirpur with tiger-themed body paint.

== Biography ==
Bukhari is a motor mechanic by profession and his father is a imam at a mosque. He has traveled to India, Sri Lanka, and Zimbabwe over nine years to support the Bangladesh national cricket team. He is supported by corporate entities, cricketers, and cricket board officials financially. He is referred to as "Tiger" by some Bangladesh cricketers.

== See also ==
- Sudhir Kumar Chaudhary, Indian cricket superfan
