= Sudhir Kumar Chaudhary =

Indian teacher known for attending every home match of the Indian cricket team

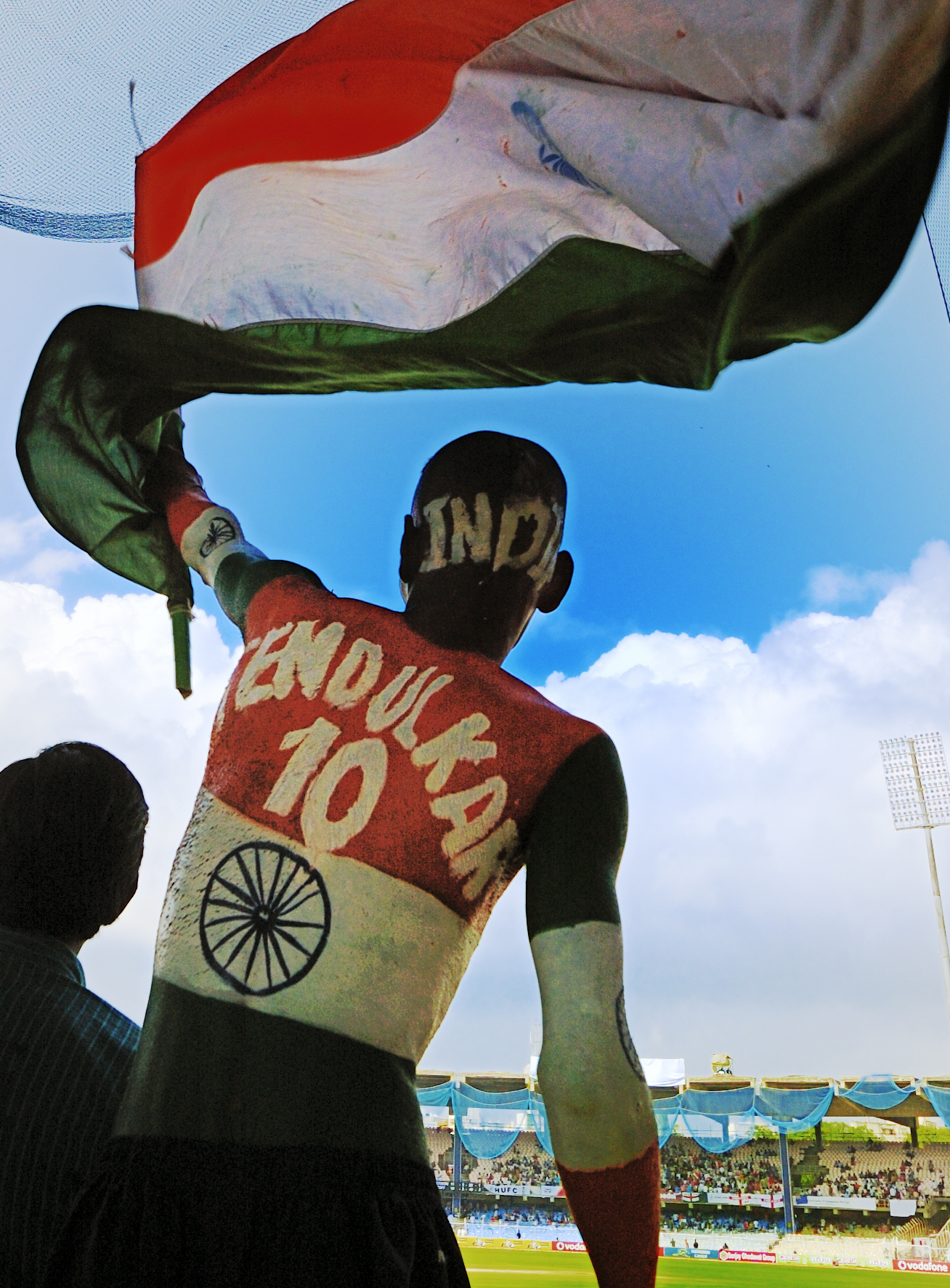
- Chaudhary at the Chepauk Stadium in Chennai; having body painted on him the Flag of India as well as the Jersey number and name of Sachin Tendulkar.
- Born: 20 February 1981 (age 45); Muzaffarpur, Bihar
- Occupations: Cricket fan; Entertainer
- Years active: 2003–present
- Known for: Supporting the Indian national cricket team and Sachin Tendulkar

Sudhir Kumar Chaudhary, also known as Sudhir Kumar Gautam, is an Indian teacher and cricket enthusiast who is a known to be a fan of the Indian cricket team and Sachin Tendulkar. He is widely recognised for attending every home match the Indian team has played since 2007. For some overseas tours, he collects funds from the public. He is usually seen in stadium with his body painted in the national colours of India, waving the national flag in the live telecast of the matches.

== Early and personal life ==
Choudhary was born in a very poor family in a semi-rural place of Muzaffarpur, Bihar. He became obsessed with Indian Cricket and a fan of Tendulkar at the age of 6. He left his studies at the age of 14 when he was in his secondary school. He was unemployed, having previously worked for a milk company and trained as a teacher. He had reportedly postponed his marriage so that he could watch all the matches played by the Indian team, wanting to follow the team wherever it played. This style of living followed by Chaudhary has made his parents unhappy.

He once threatened self-immolation if he was not assured of watching all cricket matches played by the Indian cricket team. He declared that his life was dedicated to watching Indian cricket matches and he lives his life on public support.

Chaudhary is a Hindu. He attended the Consecration of the Ram Mandir in January 2024.

== Cricket fan ==
Since 2003, Chaudhary's passion has been to watch cricket matches played by India and to support the team. By April 2010, he had attended approximately 150 matches, often traveling by bicycle to reach the venue of match. He sometimes pedalled his cycle to cricket playing venues, as he did to Bangladesh to witness a cricket match in 2007 and to Lahore, Pakistan in 2006. To save money, he sometimes braved ticketless travel in trains to reach venues. When attending cricket matches, he paints his body with the tri-colour, the colours of India flag, and he usually paints the name of Tendulkar on his chest. He carries a conch with him and blows the conch to announce the arrival of the Indian cricket team. Chaudhary paints his body on the previous day of a match and skips sleep that night to preserve the paint on his body. He cycled for 21 days from Muzaffarpur, Bihar to Mumbai to watch Sachin play for India against Australia on 28 October 2003 and this was the first tri-series match where he started supporting India by waving Indian tri-colour.

== 2011 Cricket World Cup and meeting Tendulkar ==
During the 2011 Cricket World Cup, Chaudhary sported a kooky crown on his head, a replica of the Cricket World Cup Trophy. Sudhir's crowning moment came on 2 April 2011, the day India defeated Sri Lanka in the final at Wankhede Stadium, Mumbai, to become the world champions. Tendulkar himself signaled him who was sitting among the cheering Indian fans, to come to the Indian dressing room and join the team's celebrations. Tendulkar asked Zaheer Khan to bring the World Cup trophy over. Tendulkar shook hands with Chaudhary, hugged him and finally let him lift the cup from Zaheer's hands. Tendulkar allowed Chaudhary to hold the World Cup along with him and he celebrated the occasion by posing for photographs.

== Facing attacks ==
- In March 2010, a Senior Police officer intercepted and thrashed Chaudhary in Kanpur, when he tried to shake hands with Tendulkar during a practice session. Later, after Tendulkar's intervention and request he was let off, and the police officer tendered an apology to him, repenting the event. He stopped the practice of scaling fences to reach the team to celebrate a win, only after Tendulkar advised against such practice. After this incident, the BCCI has sponsored him for every home match of the Indian team.
- In 2015, during the India - Bangladesh series in Mirpur, he was attacked and harassed by Bangladesh fans booing against India, when he was trying to leave the stadium. He feared for his life but was eventually rescued by Bangladesh Police.
- In 2022, He was beaten up by police officers in Muzaffarpur when he went to the station to enquire about his brother's arrest. Coincidently, the station had invited him for its inauguration two years prior.

== In popular culture ==
Chaudhary is one of three principal roles of a documentary film Beyond All Boundaries which tells the stories of three different personalities of Indian cricket and he is shown as a super fan of the sport. Made by film maker Sushrut Jain, the film shows details about the personal life of Sudhir Kumar.

== See also ==
- Cricket in India
